= List of corvettes of the Swedish Navy =

Ships of the
Swedish Navy
Capital ships
Coastal defence ships
Corvettes
Cruisers
Destroyers
Frigates
Mine warfare vessels
Monitors
Patrol vessels
Gunboats
Sloops of war
Submarines
Torpedo boats

This is a list of Swedish corvettes of the period 1821-2006.

== Active ==
Stockholm class

- HSwMS Stockholm (K11) (1984)
- HSwMS Malmö (K12) (1985)

Göteborg class

- HSwMS Göteborg (K21) (1989)
- HSwMS Gävle (K22) (1990)
- HSwMS Kalmar (K23) (1990)
- HSwMS Sundsvall (K24) (1991)

Visby class

- HSwMS Visby (K31) (2000)
- HSwMS Helsingborg (K32) (2003)
- HSwMS Härnösand (K33) (2004)
- HSwMS Nyköping (K34) (2005)
- HSwMS Karlstad (K35) (2006)

== Historical corvettes ==
- HSwMS Jarramas (1821)
- HSwMS Najaden (1834)
- HSwMS Carlskrona (1841)
- HSwMS Svalan (1845)
- HSwMS Lagerbielke (1848)
- HSwMS Freja (1885)

=== Steam-corvettes ===
- HSwMS Gefle (1847)
- HSwMS Orädd (1853)
- HSwMS Balder (1870)
- HSwMS Saga (1877)

== Gallery ==
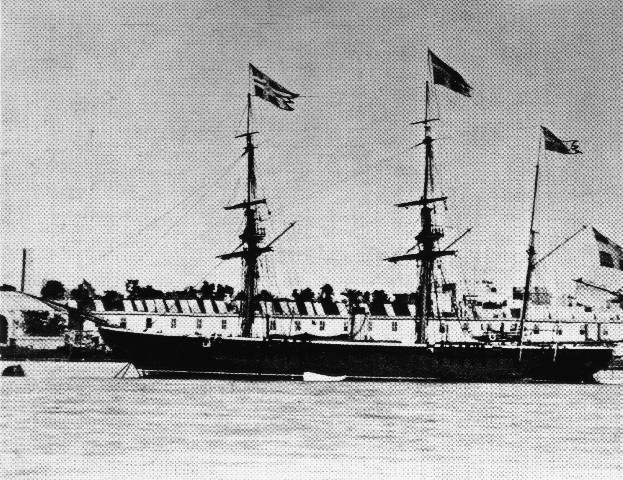
HSwMS Gefle was one of the first Swedish steam-corvettes...

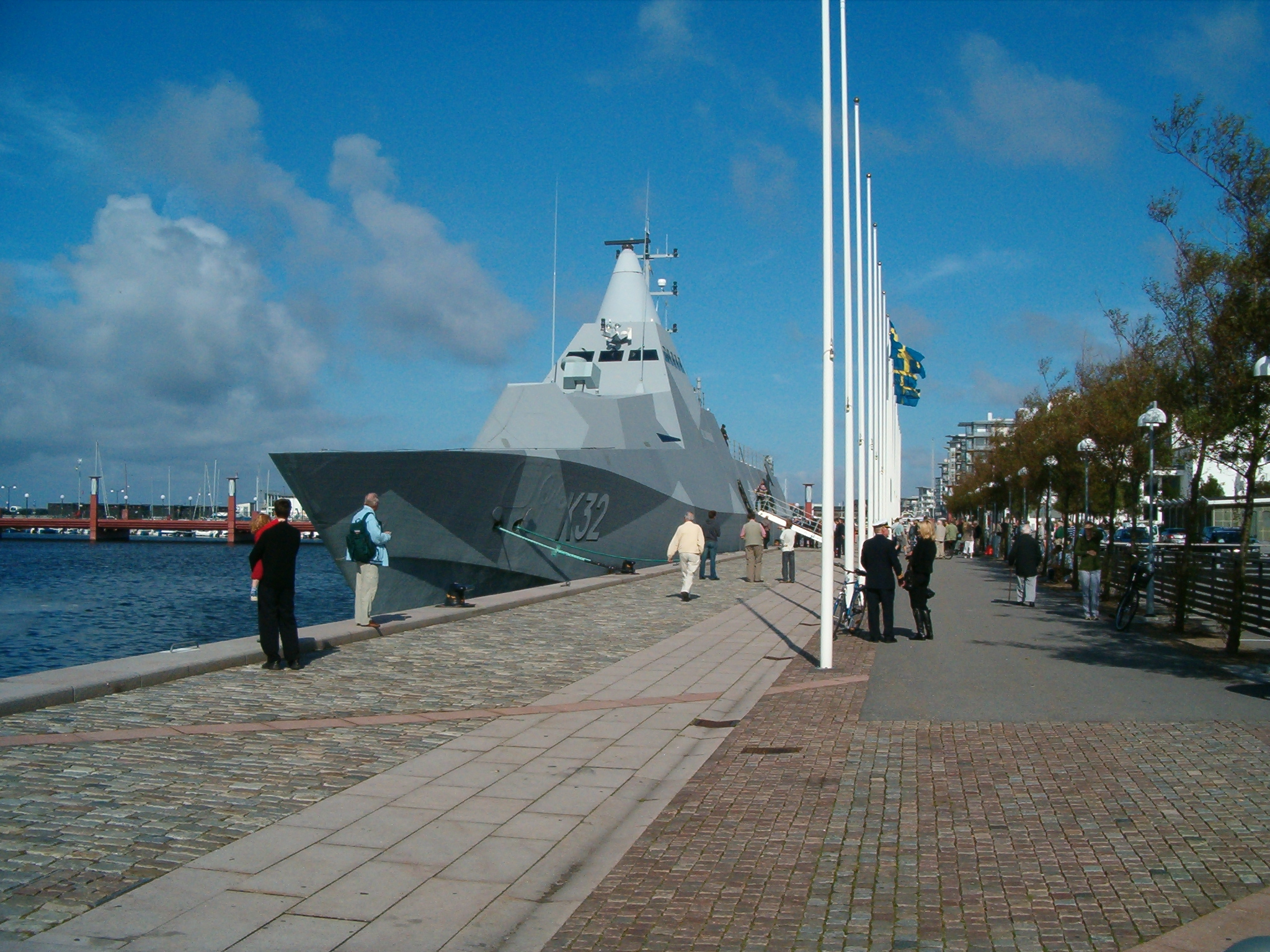
...and HSwMS Helsingborg (K32) is one of the latest modern Swedish corvettes.
