= HSwMS Kalmar =

Five warships of Sweden have been named Kalmar, after Kalmar:

- HSwMS Kalmar (1677), a warship launched in 1677.
- HSwMS Kalmar (1695), a warship launched in 1749.
- HSwMS Kalmar (1749), a galley launched in 1749 and stricken in 1810.
- HSwMS Kalmar (J14), a Visby-class destroyer launched in 1943 and stricken in 1978.
- HSwMS Kalmar (K23), a Göteborg-class corvette launched in 1990 and since in active service.
