= Gothenburg (disambiguation) =

Gothenburg is a city in Sweden.

Gothenburg may also refer to:

== Sweden ==
- Gothenburg Airport (disambiguation)
- Gothenburg Municipality, in Västra Götaland County, Sweden
- Gothenburg Municipality (Riksdag constituency)
- Gothenburg Public House System
- EA Gothenburg, a Swedish video game developer owned by Electronic Arts
- Metropolitan Gothenburg, a metropolitan area surrounding the city of Gothenburg, Sweden
- University of Gothenburg

== Other places ==
- Gothenburg, Nebraska, United States

== See also ==
- Göteborg (disambiguation)
- Götheborg (ship), a large 18th-century wooden sail ship
- SS Gothenburg, wreck disaster in 1875
