= HSwMS Visby =

Several ships of the Swedish Navy have been named HSwMS Visby, named after the city of Visby:

- HSwMS Visby (J11) was a Visby-class destroyer launched in 1942 and decommissioned in 1982
- HSwMS Visby (K31) is a Visby-class corvette launched in 2000
