= HSwMS Sundsvall (J12) =

Swedish destroyer

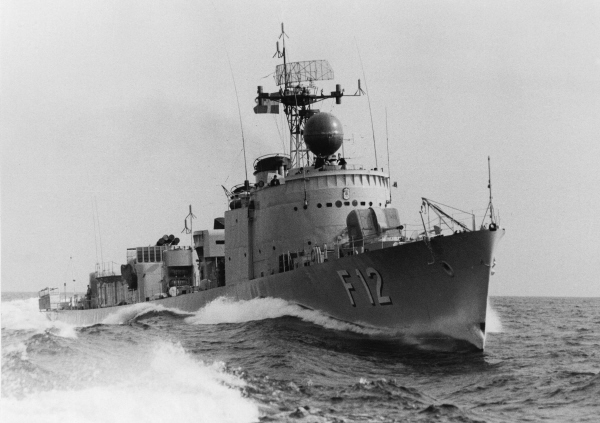
- Sundsvall in 1967

History

Sweden
- Name: Sundsvall
- Namesake: Sundsvall
- Builder: Eriksbergs Mekaniska Verkstad
- Laid down: 1942
- Launched: 20 October 1942
- Commissioned: 17 September 1943
- Decommissioned: 1 July 1982
- Reclassified: Rated as frigate, 1965
- Fate: Scrapped, 1984
- Badge

General characteristics
- Class & type: Visby-class destroyer
- Displacement: 1,135–1,320 tons
- Length: 98 m (322 ft)
- Beam: 9 m (30 ft)
- Draught: 3.8 m (12 ft)
- Speed: 39 kn (72 km/h; 45 mph)
- Complement: 155
- Armament: As destroyer; 3 × single 120 mm (4.7 in) guns; 2 x twin 40 mm (1.6 in) AA guns; 4 x single 40 mm (1.6 in) AA guns; 4 x single 20 mm (0.79 in) AA guns; 2 x single 8 mm MGs; 6 x 530 mm (21 in) torpedo tubes; As frigate; 2 × single 57 mm lvakan m/50 D; 1 × quad 375 mm (14.8 in) ASW rocket launcher; Depth charges; Mines
- Aircraft carried: 1 helicopter as frigate

HSwMS Sundsvall (J12) was a Swedish destroyer, later rebuilt as a frigate, in the four-ship Visby class. The ship was named after the Swedish coastal city of Sundsvall. Sundsvall was laid down in 1942 during the Second World War, and was commissioned on 17 September 1943. She survived the war, and was modified and redesigned as a frigate in 1965. She was kept in service by the Swedish Navy until 1982, and was then used for testing of the Navy's RBS-15 anti-ship missile. The ship was later sold to Spain for scrapping.

== Design ==
Sundsvall was 97.5 meters long and 9.2 meters wide. The hull was made of steel while the superstructures were constructed of light metal. The main superstructure was just forward of midships and housed among other the galley, wheelhouse and navigation bridge and the command bridge. The machine consisted of three Penhoët A oil-fired boilers which generated steam for two of the de Laval steam turbines of 36,000 horsepower, which in turn drove two propellers. This machinery gave the ships a maximum speed of 39 knots. The main guns consisted of three Bofors 12 cm M/24 naval guns, one at bow and the rest in superfiring at stern. The air defense consisted of eight Bofors 40 mm m/36 anti-aircraft guns, consisted of two single guns on each side of midship and two twin guns on a platform at the aft. In addition, there were four Bofors 20 mm m/40 anti-aircraft guns, two 8 mm lvksp m/36 machine guns, torpedo tubes, and more than 40 mines and 16 depth charges could be carried.

== History ==
Sundsvall was built at Eriksbergs Mekaniska Verkstad in Gothenburg and was launched on 20 October 1942 and was delivered to the Swedish Navy on 17 September 1943. After delivery, Sundsvall was put into the Coastal Fleet, where she served during the rest of World War II.

=== Conversion ===
In the mid-1960s, Sundsvall underwent extensive rebuilding. The front and aft 12 cm guns were replaced with 57 mm m/50 D anti-aircraft guns and the third was removed and replaced by a Bofors 37.5 cm M/50 anti-submarine rocket launcher. Additionally, two more rack-deployed m/33 depth charges were added and the mining capacity was extended to 130 mines. A helicopter platform was built and a new fire-control system was installed with a new radar antenna in a radome on the bridge deck. In 1965 the ship was reclassified to frigate and in 1966 the conversion was completed.

=== Fate ===
Sundsvall was decommissioned on 1 July 1982, after which she was used as a target ship for test firing with RBS-15 before she was sold for scrap in Spain in 1984.

== Bibliography ==
- Borgenstam, Curt; Insulander, Per; Kaudern, Gösta (1989). Jagare: med Svenska flottans jagare under 80 år (in Swedish). Västra Frölunda: Marinlitteratur. ISBN 91-970700-4-1. SELIBR 7792227.
- von Hofsten, Gustaf; Waernberg, Jan; Ohlsson, Curt S. (2003). Örlogsfartyg: svenska maskindrivna fartyg under tretungad flagg. [Forum navales skriftserie], 1650-1837; [6] (in Swedish). Stockholm: Svenskt militärhistoriskt bibl. i samarbete med Marinlitteratur. ISBN 919743843X. OCLC 57511564. SELIBR 8873330.
- Lagvall, Bertil (1991). Flottans neutralitetsvakt 1939-1945: krönika. Marinlitteraturföreningen, 0348-2405; 71 (in Swedish). Stockholm: Marinlitteraturfören. ISBN 91-85944-05-X. SELIBR 7753511.
- Whitley, M. J. (2000). Destroyers of World War Two: An International Encyclopedia. London: Cassell & Co. ISBN 1-85409-521-8.
