= HSwMS Göteborg =

HSwMS Göteborg includes the following ships of the Swedish Navy:

- HSwMS Göteborg (J5), lead Göteborg-class destroyer, launched 1935, sunk as target 1962
- HSwMS Göteborg (K21), lead Göteborg-class corvette, launched 1989

== See also ==
- Göteborg (disambiguation)
