= K21 (disambiguation) =

K21 is a South Korean infantry fighting vehicle.

K21 may also refer to:

== Vehicles ==
Automobiles

- Changhe Freedom K21, a Chinese pickup truck

Ships

- HMS Dart (K21), a frigate of the Royal Navy
- HSwMS Göteborg (K21), a corvette of the Swedish Navy
- Soviet submarine K-21

Aircraft

- Schleicher ASK 21, a two-seater training glider commonly referred to as the K21

== Other uses ==
- K-21 (Kansas highway)
- Gastroesophageal reflux
- Lactobacillus plantarum strain K21
- Uniform k_{21} polytope
- "Va, dal furor portata", an aria by Wolfgang Amadeus Mozart
