= HSwMS Hälsingborg (J13) =

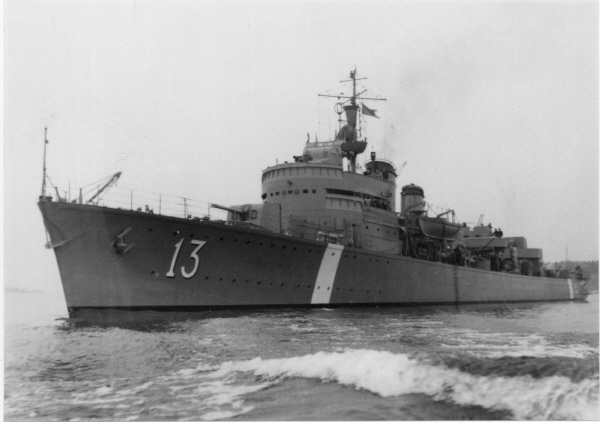
- Hälsingborg

History

Sweden
- Name: Hälsingborg
- Namesake: Helsingborg
- Ordered: 1941
- Builder: Götaverken
- Launched: 23 March 1943
- Commissioned: 30 November 1943
- Decommissioned: 1 July 1978
- Reclassified: Rated as frigate, 1965
- Identification: Pennant number: J13, F13
- Fate: Scrapped, 1979
- Badge

General characteristics
- Class & type: Visby-class destroyer
- Displacement: 1,153 t (1,135 long tons) standard; 1,320 t (1,300 long tons) full load
- Length: 98 m (321 ft 6 in)
- Beam: 9 m (29 ft 6 in)
- Draught: 3.8 m (12 ft 6 in)
- Speed: 39 knots (72 km/h; 45 mph)
- Complement: 155
- Armament: As destroyer; 3 × single 120 mm (4.7 in) guns; 2 x twin 40 mm (1.6 in) AA guns; 4 x single 40 mm (1.6 in) AA guns; 4 x single 20 mm (0.79 in) AA guns; 2 x single 8 mm MGs; 2 x triple 530 mm (21 in) torpedo tubes; As frigate; 2 × single 57 mm lvakan m/50 D; 1 × quad 375 mm (14.8 in) ASW rocket launcher; Depth charges; Mines
- Aviation facilities: Helipad (frigate)

HSwMS Hälsingborg (J13) was the third ship of the Visby-class destroyer.

== Design ==
Visby-class destroyers are 97.5 meters long and 9.2 meters wide. The hull was built of steel while the superstructures were built of light metal. The main superstructure was just about the midships and housed, among other things, crew kitchens, wheelhouse and maneuvering cabin as well as command bridge. The machinery consisted of three Penhoët A oil-fired steam boilers, which generated steam for two 36,000-horsepower Laval steam turbines, which in turn powered two propellers. This machinery gave the vessels a maximum speed of 39 knots. The main guns consisted of three Bofors 12 cm M/24 naval guns, one at bow and the rest in superfiring at stern. The air defense consisted of eight Bofors 40 mm m/36 anti-aircraft guns, consisted of two single guns on each side of midship and two twin guns on a platform at the aft. In addition, there were four Bofors 20 mm m/40 anti-aircraft guns, two 8 mm lvksp m/36 machine guns, torpedo tubes, and more than 40 mines and 16 depth charges could be carried.

== History ==
Hälsingborg was built at Götaverken in Gothenburg and was launched on 23 March 1943 and commissioned on 30 November 1943.

In the early 1960s, Hälsingborg underwent an extensive rebuild. The front and aft 12 cm guns were replaced with 57 mm m/50 D anti-aircraft guns and the third was removed and replaced by a Bofors 37.5 cm M/50 anti-submarine rocket launcher. In addition, two more m/33 depth charges were added and the mine capacity was increased to 130 mines. Helicopter platform was built and new fire line was installed with a new radar antenna in a radome on the bridge deck. In 1965, the ship was reclassified as a frigate.

Hälsingborg was decommissioned on 1 July 1978, after which she was sold in 1979 for scrapping in Gothenburg. The ship's ship bell and coat of arms are now set up at the entrance to the wedding chapel in Helsingborg City Hall.

== Bibliography ==
- Borgenstam, Curt; Insulander, Per; Kaudern, Gösta (1989). Jagare: med Svenska flottans jagare under 80 år (in Swedish). Västra Frölunda: Marinlitteratur. ISBN 91-970700-4-1. SELIBR 7792227.
- Gardiner, Robert; Chumbley, Stephen (1995). Conway's All The World's Fighting Ships 1947–1995. Annapolis, Maryland, USA: Naval Institute Press. ISBN 1-55750-132-7.
- von Hofsten, Gustaf; Waernberg, Jan; Ohlsson, Curt S. (2003). Örlogsfartyg: svenska maskindrivna fartyg under tretungad flagg. [Forum navales skriftserie], 1650-1837; [6] (in Swedish). Stockholm: Svenskt militärhistoriskt bibl. i samarbete med Marinlitteratur. ISBN 919743843X. OCLC 57511564. SELIBR 8873330.
- Whitley, M. J. (2000). Destroyers of World War Two: An International Encyclopedia. London: Cassell & Co. ISBN 1-85409-521-8.
