= HSwMS Visby (J11) =

Swedish Visby-class destroyer

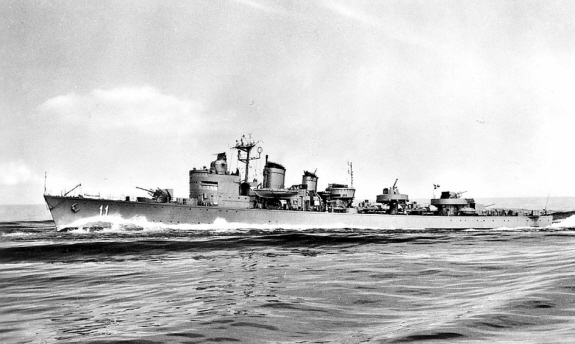
- Visby

History

Sweden
- Name: Visby
- Namesake: Visby
- Builder: Götaverken
- Launched: 16 October 1942
- Commissioned: 10 August 1943
- Decommissioned: 1 July 1982
- Reclassified: Rated as frigate, 1965
- Identification: Pennant number: J11
- Fate: Scrapped, 1984
- Badge

General characteristics
- Class & type: Visby-class destroyer
- Displacement: 1,153 t (1,135 long tons) standard; 1,320 t (1,300 long tons) full load
- Length: 98 m (321 ft 6 in)
- Beam: 9 m (29 ft 6 in)
- Draught: 3.8 m (12 ft 6 in)
- Speed: 39 knots (72 km/h; 45 mph)
- Complement: 155
- Armament: As destroyer; 3 × single 120 mm (4.7 in) guns; 2 x twin 40 mm (1.6 in) AA guns; 4 x single 40 mm (1.6 in) AA guns; 4 x single 20 mm (0.79 in) AA guns; 2 x single 8 mm MGs; 2 x triple 530 mm (21 in) torpedo tubes; As frigate; 2 × single 57 mm lvakan m/50 D; 1 × quad 375 mm (14.8 in) ASW rocket launcher; Depth charges; Mines
- Aviation facilities: Helipad (frigate)

HSwMS Visby (J11) was the lead ship of the Visby-class destroyer.

== Design ==
Visby-class destroyers are 97.5 meters long and 9.2 meters wide. The hull was built of steel while the superstructures were built of light metal. The main superstructure was just about the midships and housed, among other things, crew kitchens, wheelhouse and maneuvering cabin as well as command bridge. The machinery consisted of three Penhoët A oil-fired steam boilers, which generated steam for two 36,000-horsepower Laval steam turbines, which in turn powered two propellers. This machinery gave the vessels a maximum speed of 39 knots. The main guns consisted of three Bofors 12 cm M/24 naval guns, one at bow and the rest in superfiring at stern. The air defense consisted of eight Bofors 40 mm m/36 anti-aircraft guns, consisted of two single guns on each side of midship and two twin guns on a platform at the aft. In addition, there were four Bofors 20 mm m/40 anti-aircraft guns, two 8 mm lvksp m/36 machine guns, torpedo tubes, and more than 40 mines and 16 depth charges could be carried.

== History ==
Visby was built at Götaverken in Gothenburg and was launched on 16 October 1942 and commissioned on 10 August 1943.

In the early 1960s, Visby underwent an extensive rebuild. The front and aft 12 cm guns were replaced with 57 mm m/50 D anti-aircraft guns and the third was removed and replaced by a Bofors 37.5 cm M/50 anti-submarine rocket launcher. In addition, two more m/33 depth charges were added and the mine capacity was increased to 130 mines. Helicopter platform was built and new fire line was installed with a new radar antenna in a radome on the bridge deck. In 1965, the ship was reclassified as a frigate.

Visby was decommissioned on 1 July 1982, after which she was used as a target ship for test firing with RBS-15 before she was sold in 1984 for scrapping in Spain.

== Bibliography ==
- Borgenstam, Curt; Insulander, Per; Kaudern, Gösta (1989). Jagare: med Svenska flottans jagare under 80 år (in Swedish). Västra Frölunda: Marinlitteratur. ISBN 91-970700-4-1. SELIBR 7792227.
- Gardiner, Robert; Chumbley, Stephen (1995). Conway's All The World's Fighting Ships 1947–1995. Annapolis, Maryland, USA: Naval Institute Press. ISBN 1-55750-132-7.
- von Hofsten, Gustaf; Waernberg, Jan; Ohlsson, Curt S. (2003). Örlogsfartyg: svenska maskindrivna fartyg under tretungad flagg. [Forum navales skriftserie], 1650-1837; [6] (in Swedish). Stockholm: Svenskt militärhistoriskt bibl. i samarbete med Marinlitteratur. ISBN 919743843X. OCLC 57511564. SELIBR 8873330.
- Whitley, M. J. (2000). Destroyers of World War Two: An International Encyclopedia. London: Cassell & Co. ISBN 1-85409-521-8.
