= J13 =

J13 may refer to:

== Roads ==
- County Route J13 (California)
- Johor State Route J13, in Malaysia

== Vehicles ==
- GNR Class J13, a British steam locomotive class
- HSwMS Hälsingborg (J13), a Visby-class destroyer of the Swedish Navy
- Shenyang J-13, a cancelled Chinese light fighter aircraft

== Other uses ==
- Bacterial pneumonia
- Pentagonal bipyramid, a Johnson solid (J_{13})
- J13, a Nissan J engine
- July 13th, 2024 - the date US presidential candidate Donald Trump was shot in Butler, PA
