= J14 =

J14 may refer to:

== Roads ==
- County Route J14 (California)

== Vehicles ==
- HSwMS Kalmar (J14), a Visby-class destroyer of the Swedish Navy
- LNER Class J14, a British steam locomotive class
- Shenyang J-14, a speculated Chinese fighter jet

== Other uses ==
- J-14 (magazine), an American magazine
- Jeffery Jump, numbered J14, a bus route in Chicago
- Bacterial pneumonia
- Elongated triangular bipyramid, a Johnson solid (J_{14})
