= K24 =

K24 may refer to:

- Honda K24 engine
- HMS Hibiscus (K24), a corvette of the Royal Navy
- HSwMS Sundsvall (K24), a corvette of the Swedish Navy
- K24 TV, a Kenyan television station
- Kurdistan 24, a television station
