= List of capital ships of Sweden =

Ships of the
Swedish Navy
Capital ships
Coastal defence ships
Corvettes
Cruisers
Destroyers
Frigates
Mine warfare vessels
Monitors
Patrol vessels
Gunboats
Sloops of war
Submarines
Torpedo boats

This is a list capital ships of Sweden of the period 1550-1859:

== List ==
Note: Armament could vary over time.

- Elefant (65), 1558. Wrecked 1564.
- Finska Svan (82), 1559.
- Svenska Hektor (87), c. 1559. Discarded 1590?
- St Christopher (58), 1562.
- Engel (49), 1545.
- St Erik (90), 1559. Discarded 1585.
- Mars, also known as Makalös and Jutehatar (107), c. 1563. Burnt 1564.
- Enhörning (41), 1564. Discarded 1577 or 1578.
- Stockholms Hjort (53)
- Förgylta Dufva (48), 1564.
- Hjort (50), 1563.
- Röda Hund (44), captured 1562. Sold c. 1572.
- Brämaren (46), 1560s.
- Lilla Svan (50)
- Lilia (44), 1562. Sold 1570.
- Lilla Hjort (40)
- Bruna Lejon (40), captured from Livonia 1563.
- Röda Gripen (37), captured from Livonia 1563.
- Skotska Pincka (56), ex-Danish Skotske Pink, captured from Denmark 1564. Captured by Denmark 1569.
- Hector (38), captured from Denmark 1563. Sunk.
- Svenska Morian (54)
- Tranheje (75)
- Bruna Lejon (45), 1563.
- Memnon (46), 1564 or 1565.
- Jonas von Emden (45), 1565.
- Hollands Galej (43), 1557 or 1558. Discarded 1570.
- Kalmar Bark (48), 1556. Discarded 1578 or 1579.
- Röda Drake (100), c. 1570. Discarded 1592?
- Röda Lejon (40), 1563. Wrecked 1572.
- Finska Memnon (46), 1564 or 1565. Condemned c. 1574.
- Tre Kronor (39), ex-Danish Vite Örn, captured from Denmark while building c. 1598. Discarded c. 1625.
- Vasa (50), 1599. Burnt 1623.
- Äpplet (50), c. 1603.
- Äpplet (74), c. 1622. Sold back to builders 1625.
- Äpplet (66), c. 1628. Sunk 1659.
- Kristina (36), 1624. Wrecked 1628.
- Jupiter (50), c. 1633. Sold to France 1647.
- Mars (44), c. 1633. Discarded 1660.
- Kronan Ark (68), c. 1633. Sunk 1675.
- Göta Ark (72), 1634. Discarded 1650.
- Scepter (58), 1636. Sunk 1675.
- Patentia (48), c. 1616, ex-Danish Patientia (49), captured 1644.
- Oldenburg (42), c. 1628, ex-Danish Oldenborg (32), captured 1644. Condemned 1660.
- Tre Lejon (46), c. 1642, ex-Danish Tre Løver (38), captured 1644. Sunk 1667.
- Andromeda (44), 1649 or 1650. Wrecked 1654 or 1655.
- Vestervik (44), bought 1647. Burnt 1676.
- Cesar (54), c. 1648. Captured by Denmark 1677 and renamed Julius Caesar.
- Maria (54), c. 1648. Condemned 1677.
- Sankt Anna (46), c. 1649. Given to France 1650.
- Wismar (44), c. 1649. Given away 1692.
- Herkules (58), 1654. Rebuilt 1689-90, sunk 1710.
- Carolus (54), 1650. Renamed Carolus IX 1678, sunk 1692?
- Merkurius (46), c. 1652. Renamed Falken (40), c. 1670, captured by Denmark 1675 and renamed Svenske Falk.
- Falken (46), c. 1652. Sold to Portugal c. 1670.
- Amarant (46), 1654. Captured by Denmark 1677 and renamed Amirante.
- Apollo (46), bought 1654. Sunk 1677.
- Draken (64), 1656. Captured by Denmark 1677 and renamed Drage.
- Mane (46), bought 1655. Sunk 1698.
- Göteborg (48), 1656. Condemned 1681.
- Viktoria (74), 1658. Sunk 1688?
- Pelikan (40), ex-Danish Pelikan (36), captured 1658. Captured by the Dutch Republic 1658.
- Delmenhorst (26), ex-Danish Delmenhorst (44), captured 1658. Captured by the Dutch Republic 1658.
- Ulven (44), 1642, ex-Danish Graa Ulv (36), captured 1659. Sunk 1670.
- Fenix (41), c. 1650, ex-Danish Foniks (40), captured 1659. Pram 1679.
- Andromeda (52), c. 1659. Hulk 1692.
- Monikendam (42), c. 1640, ex-Dutch Monnikendam (28), captured 1659. Lighter 1676.
- Äpplet (90), 1661. Wrecked 1676.
- Svärdet (90), 1662. Burnt 1676.
- Saturnus (66), 1662. Renamed Bahus/Bohus (74), 1687, sunk 1707.
- Wrangel (64), 1664. Discarded 1713.
- Nyckel (84), 1665. Burnt 1679.
- Jupiter (70), 1665. Renamed Uppland 1689, sunk 1710.
- Spes (48), 1666. Wrecked 1697.
- Mars (70), c. 1667. Captured by Denmark 1677.
- Solen (70), c. 1667. Sunk 1694.
- Venus (68), 1667. Renamed Finland 1685, sunk 1706.
- Kronan (128), 1668. Capsized and exploded, 1676.
- Svenska Lejonet (40/52), 1656. Captured by Denmark 1677 and renamed Svenske Løve.
- Wismar (58), c. 1694.
- Merkurius (68), 1672. Captured by the Dutch Republic 1677.
- Neptunus (44), c. 1673. Captured by Denmark 1676.
- (Sankt) Hieronymus (70), bought 1675. Captured by the Dutch Republic and given to Denmark, 1677.
- Wrangels Palats (44), hired 1675. Captured by Denmark 1677.
- Laxen (50), c. 1677. Captured by Denmark 1679.
- Kalmar (62), c. 1677. Burnt 1677.
- Carolus XI (82), 1678. Renamed Sverige 1683, Wenden 1684, Prins Carl 1694, Sverige 1694. Discarded 1721.
- Drottning Ulrika (70), c. 1680. Renamed Prinsessan Ulrika Eleonora 1692, Victoria 1694. Sunk 1714.
- Göta (76), c. 1684. Discarded 1712.
- Drottning Hedvig Eleanora (70), 1680. Renamed Sverige 1694, renamed Småland 1694, Discarded 1729.
- Karlskrona (70), 1686. Discarded 1730.
- Wrangel (70)
- Upland (70)
- Hercules (62)
- Öland (56), 1681. Wrecked 1705.
- Wachtmeister (56), c. 1681. Captured by Russia at the Battle of Ösel Island, 4 June 1719.
- Prins Carl (76), 1682. Renamed Stockholm 1694. Sunk 1710.
- Halland (56), c. 1682. Sunk 1722.
- Gotland (56), c. 1682. Sunk 1722.
- Lifland (56), c. 1682. Sunk 1726.
- Blekinge (70), 1682. Sunk 1713.
- Estland (56), c. 1683. Sunk 1732.
- Osel (56), c. 1683. Discarded 1718.
- Konung Karl (90), c. 1683. Renamed Drottning Hedvig Eleonora 1694, sunk 1712.
- Carolus IX (56), c. 1650. Discarded 1684.
- Mane (42)
- Carolus (110), 1694. Discarded 1771.
- Princessa Hedvig (80), 1692. Launched as Drottning Ulrika Eleonora, renamed Wenden 1694, Prinsessan Hedvig Sofia 1694. Sunk 1715.
- Wenden (72)
- Viktoria (80), c. 1690. Renamed Prinsessan Ulrika Eleonora 1694, aground and burnt, 1710.
- Pommern (56), c. 1692. Discarded 1770.
- Södermanland (56), c. 1693. Captured by Denmark 1715 and renamed Sydermanland.
- Kalmar (46), 1695. Scuttled 1719.
- Stettin (46), 1695. Scuttled 1719.
- Enigheten (94), c. 1696. Rearmed to 66 guns 1730, renamed Konung Fredrik 1732, sunk 1785.
- Westmanland (62), c. 1696. Rebuilt 1727, discarded 1778.
- Göteborg (48), c. 1696. Captured by Denmark 1715.
- Skåne (64), c. 1697. Rebuilt 1728, BU 1768.
- Wrede (52), c. 1697. Lost at sea 1711.
- Frederika Amalia (62), c. 1698. Rebuilt 1747, discarded 1776.
- Norrköping (52), c. 1698. Wrecked 1708.
- Wismar (46), c. 1694.
- Warberg (42), captured by Denmark 1719.
- Elfsborg (42)
- Götha Lejon (90), c. 1702. Discarded 1745.
- Nordstjernan (76), 1703. Captured by Denmark 1715 and renamed Nordstjern.
- Prins Carl Fredrik (72), c. 1704. Sold 1797.
- Bremen (64), c. 1705. Sold 1781.
- Öland (50), c. 1705. Wrecked 1742.
- Tre Kronor (86), c. 1706. Aground and burnt, 1710.
- Werden (54), c. 1706. Discarded 1754.
- Nya Riga (54), c. 1708. Blew up 1717.
- Stockholm (68), c. 1708. Sold 1781.
- Fredrika/Prinsessa Fredrika von Hessen (52), scuttled, captured by Denmark and refloated, 1719.
- Halmstad (54), scuttled 1719.
- Prins Carl (90)
- Kronskepp (40), c. 1710, ex-Russian, captured 1713/14 on delivery voyage, ex-French Le Beau Parterre, ex-Dutch Schonauwen, captured 1711. Discarded 1722?
- Ulrika Eleonora (84), 1719. Discarded 1765.
- Greve Sparre (52), c. 1724.
- (Prinsesse), Sophia Charlotta (60), c. 1725. Sold 1781.
- Fred (42), c. 1730.
- Friheten (66), c. 1731. Sold 1781.
- Drottningholm (42), c. 1731.
- Hessen Cassel (64), c. 1731. Renamed Hertig Ferdinand 1779. Discarded 1807.
- Enigheten (70), 1732. Burnt 1790.
- Sverige (80), c. 1734. Wrecked 1738 during transfer to Turkey.
- Prins Wilhelm (54), c. 1726. Sold 1781.
- Finland (60/64), c. 1735. Captured by Russia in the Battle of Vyborg Bay, 3 July 1790.
- (Konung) Adolf Fredrik (62), c. 1744. Renamed Riksens Ständer 1770, aground and burnt, 13 May 1790.
- (Greve) Sparre (54), c. 1748.
- Uppland (50), c. 1749. Captured by Russia in the Battle of Vyborg Bay, 3 July 1790.
- Södermanland (50), c. 1749. Renamed Gripen, discarded 1810.
- Gotha (66)
- Fredrik Rex (62), c. 1742. Sold 1795.
- Prins Carl (64), c. 1758. Captured by Russia at the Battle of Reval, 13 May 1790.
- Prins Gustaf (70), 1758. Captured by Russia at the Battle of Hogland, 17 July 1788.
- (Prinsessin) Sophia Albertina (60/72/74/80), c. 1764. Wrecked in storm 20 August 1781.
- (Drottning) Sofia Magdalena (74), 1774. Captured by Russia at the Battle of Vyborg Bay, 3 July 1790.
- (Prins) Fredrik Adolph (62), 1774. Discarded 1825.
- (Konung) Adolph Fredrik (70), 1775. Discarded 1825.
- (Konung) Gustaf III (70), 1777. Discarded 1825.

== Wasa class ==
- Wasa (60), 1778. Discarded 1827.
- Hedvig Elisabet Charlotta (60), c. 1781. Captured by Russia at the Battle of Vyborg Bay, 3 July 1790.
Kronprins Gustaf Adolph class (improved Wasa class),
- Kronprins Gustaf Adolph (62), 1782. Captured by Russia at the Battle of Hogland, 17 July 1788, and renamed Prints Gustav, lost at sea 1797.
- Fädenerslandet (62), 1783. Discarded 1864.
- Ömheten (62), 1783. Captured by Russia at the Battle of Vyborg Bay, 3 July 1790.
- Rättvisan (62), 1783. Captured by Russia at the Battle of Vyborg Bay, 3 July 1790, captured by Britain 1808.
- Dygden (62), 1784. Internal explosion and fire 1793.
- Äran (62), 1784. Rebuilt as frigate Göteborg 1839, sold 1874.
- Försiktigheten (62), 1784. Discarded 1825.
- Dristigheten (62), 1785. Discarded 1867.
- Manligheten (62), 1785. Discarded 1864.
- Tapperheten (62), 1785. To Gran Colombia as Bolivar 1825, sold at auction September 1826, to Portugal by 1848.
- Wladislaff (74), ex-Russian Vladislav, captured 17 July 1788 at the Battle of Hogland. Discarded 1819.
- Louisa Ulrika (72), c. 1789. Ex-East Indiaman. Captured by Russia at the Battle of Vyborg Bay, 3 July 1790.
- Konung Gustaf IV (74), 1799. Renamed Gustaf den Store 1809, renamed Försiktigheten 1825. Discarded 1871.
- Carl XIII (84), 1819. Discarded 1862.
- Karl XIV Johan (84), 1824. Rearmed to 68. Discarded 1865.
- Prins Oscar (76), 1830. Dicarded 1869.
- Gustav den Store (76), c. 1832.
- Stockholm (66), 1856. Discarded 1921.
