= HSwMS Gävle (K22) =

Swedish Göteborg-class corvette

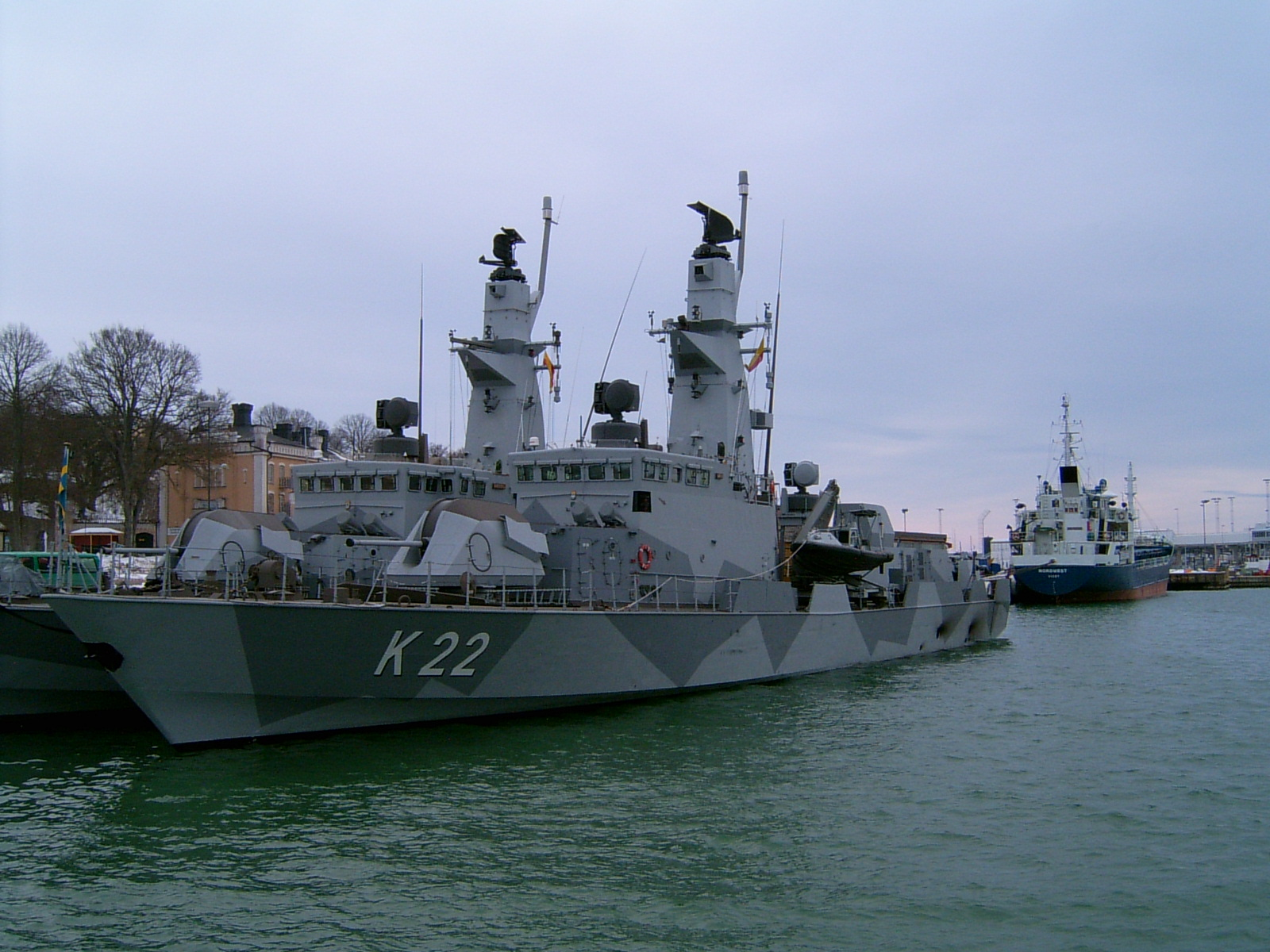
- HSwMS Gävle

History

Sweden
- Name: Gävle
- Namesake: Gävle
- Builder: Karlskrona
- Laid down: 12 January 1987
- Launched: 23 March 1990
- Commissioned: 17 September 1990
- Identification: MMSI number: 265888000; Pennant number: K22; Callsign: SCER
- Status: in active service
- Badge

General characteristics
- Class & type: Göteborg-class corvette
- Displacement: 430 tons
- Length: 57 m (187 ft 0 in) (o/a)
- Beam: 7.5 m (24 ft 7 in)
- Draught: 2.6 m (8 ft 6 in)
- Speed: 30 knots (56 km/h; 35 mph)
- Armament: 1 × Bofors 57 mm Mk3B gun; 1 × 40 mm (1.6 in) gun; 40 cm (16 in) anti-submarine torpedoes; Anti-ship missiles; Anti-submarine grenades; Depth charges; Mines
- Notes: Alternative armament or combinations of various weapons.

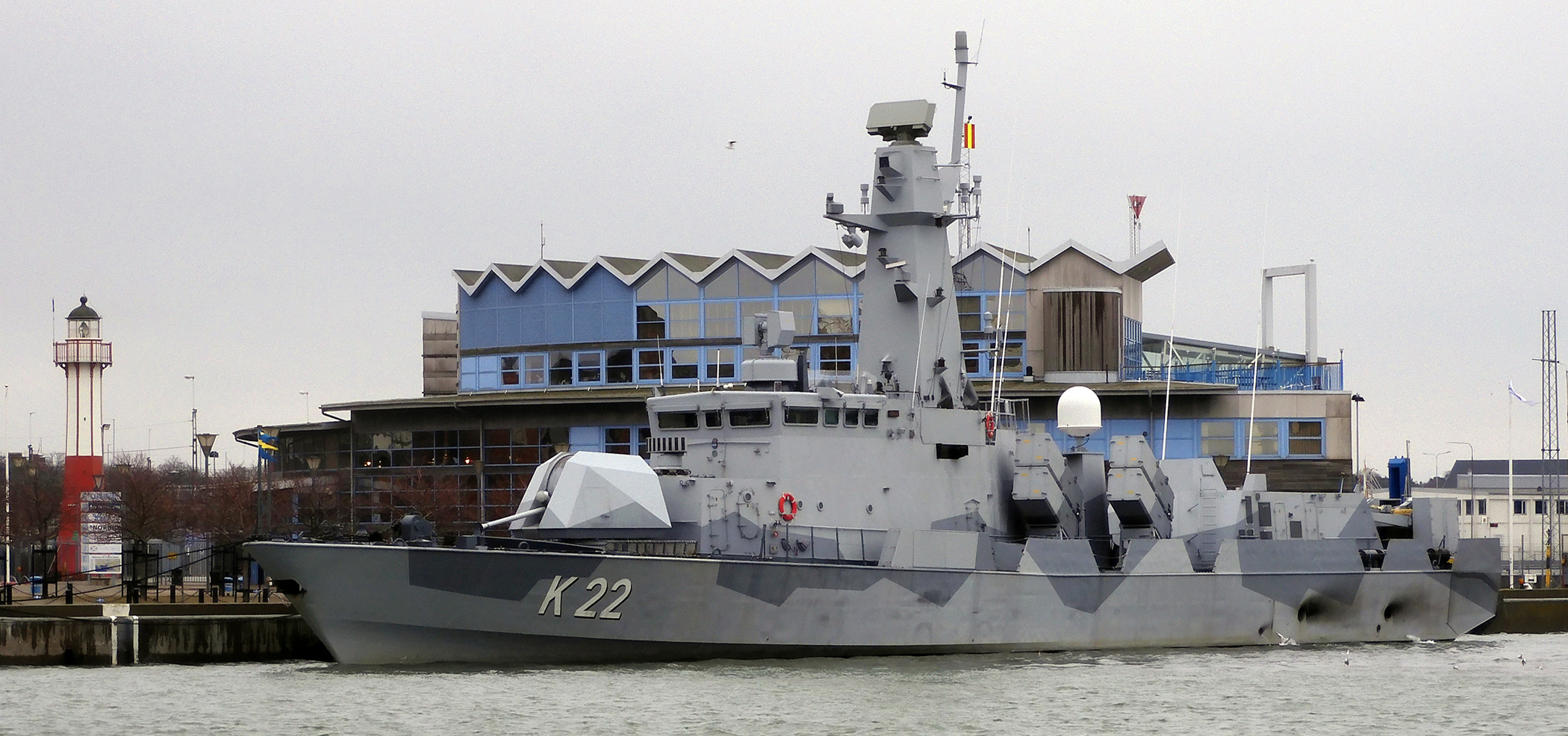
HSwMS Gävle at Ystad on 10 February 2024

HSwMS Gävle (K22) is a Swedish Navy Göteborg-class corvette, named after the Swedish city of Gävle.

== Development and design ==
The Göteborg class is a class of corvettes in the Swedish Navy, built between 1986 and 1993. The class was originally designed to destroy Soviet submarines and surface vessels, and is armed with eight RBS-15 anti-ship missiles, torpedoes, one 57 mm cannon and one 40 mm cannon.

Gävle and sister HSwMS Sundsvall were radically modernised in 2019–2022, and the class was renamed the Gävle class.

== Construction and career ==
The ship was launched on 23 March 1990 at Karlskrona and entered naval service on 17 September 1990.

Together with its sister ship Sundsvall, they took part in the United Nations operation off the coast of Lebanon following the 2006 war between Israel and Hezbollah.

== Mid-life upgrade ==
In June 2017 Saab signed a 1.249BSEK contract for life extension modification and upgrading of the Swedish Navy's Gävle and Sundsvall. Gävle was relaunched into water in September 2020 and the work on began on commissioning platform systems In May 2022 Swedish Defence Materiel Administration delivered the upgraded Gävle to the Swedish Navy. The upgrade included a new torpedo guidance system, Bofors 57 mm Mk3B gun, variable depth sonar (VDS), new sensors, all integrated Combat Management System, integrated IFF-system, AMB 3D radar similar to the one in use on the Visby-class corvettes. After the MLU the ships were no longer considered part of the Göteborg class but a new class, designated the Gävle class.

"It is a do over and modernisation of everything on board: She will have the same hull, but more or less all the systems on the inside are new", said Johan Edelsvärd, Project Manager for the Mid-Life Upgrade of HSwMS Gävle at FMV (Swedish Defence Materiel Administration).

On 13 May 2022, Gävle took part in a PASSEX training with the Finnish and the American navies in the northern Baltic Sea.
