= HSwMS Orädd =

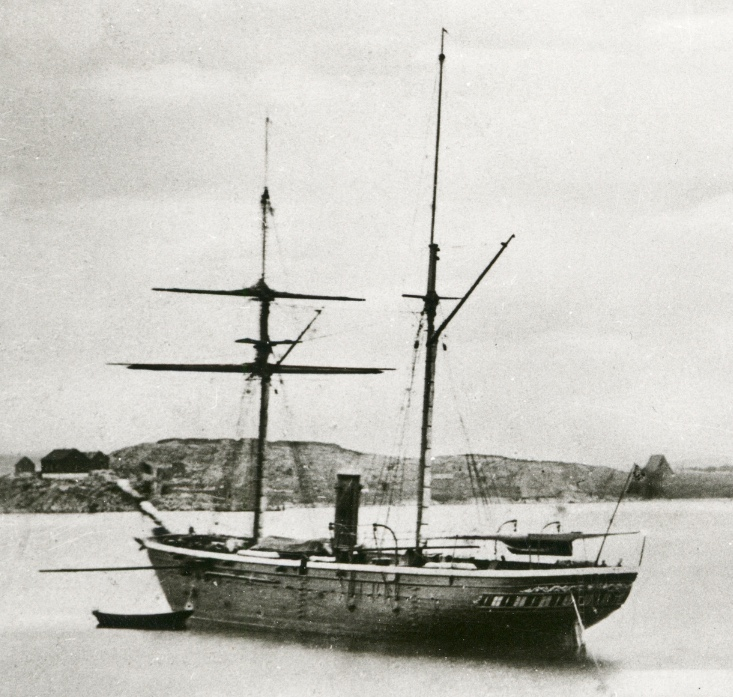
- Orädd, pictured in 1866

History

Sweden
- Name: Orädd
- Builder: Karlskrona Yard
- Launched: 10 September 1853
- Commissioned: 7 June 1854
- Decommissioned: 3 December 1866

General characteristics
- Displacement: 810 tons
- Length: 48.1 m (157.81 ft)
- Beam: 8.9 m (29.20 ft)
- Draft: 3.49 m (11.45 ft)
- Speed: 9 knots (16.67 km/h)
- Complement: 130 men
- Armament: 6 × 155 mm guns; 1 × 77 mm gun; 2 x 202 mm Paixhans guns

HSwMS Orädd was a steam corvette built for the Swedish Navy in the 19th century. She was launched in 1853 and was the fourth steam-powered combat ship built for the Swedish military. Orädd sank on 3 December 1866 close to Dungeness in the English Channel, with the loss of 12 men. The ship was on a journey back from Le Havre to Sweden after having delivered artworks for the 1867 Paris Exposition. Less than two weeks after its sinking, the wreck was sold at an auction.
