= Göteborg (disambiguation) =

Göteborg is the Swedish name of the city of Gothenburg in Sweden.

Göteborg and variants may also refer to:

- Göteborg Landvetter Airport, airport serving Gothenburg area
- Göteborg HC, ice hockey club
- Göteborgs FF, football club
- Göteborg musubi, a Hawaiian food

== Ships ==
- Göteborg-class destroyer, Swedish ship class built 1936–1941
- Göteborg-class corvette, Swedish ship class built 1986–1993
- Götheborg (ship), Swedish replica sailing ship launched 2003
