= Gothenburg Airport =

Gothenburg Airport can refer to one of three airports in or near Gothenburg, Sweden:

- Göteborg Landvetter Airport, the largest of the three and Gothenburg's only current commercial airport
- Säve Airport, closed to large passenger aircraft since 2015, but used by business jets and general aviation
- Torslanda Airport, in the nearby town of Torslanda; served as Gothenburg's primary airport 1923–1977
