= Visby-class destroyer =

Ship class

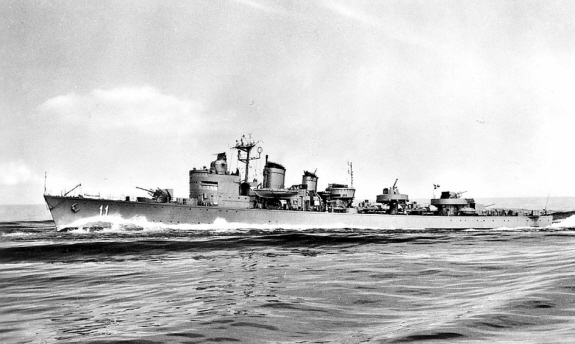
- Visby

Class overview
- Name: Visby class
- Operators: Swedish Navy
- Preceded by: Göteborg class
- Succeeded by: Öland class
- Built: 1942–1944
- In commission: 1943–1982
- Planned: 4
- Completed: 4
- Retired: 4

General characteristics
- Type: Destroyer/frigate
- Displacement: 1,135–1,320 tons
- Length: 98 m (321 ft 6 in)
- Beam: 9 m (29 ft 6 in)
- Draught: 3.8 m (12 ft 6 in)
- Speed: 39 knots (72 km/h; 45 mph)
- Complement: 155
- Armament: As destroyer; 3 × 120 mm (4.7 in) guns; 4 x 40 mm (1.6 in) cannons; 4 x 20 mm (0.79 in) cannons; 6 x 533 mm (21.0 in) torpedo tubes; As frigate; 2 × 57 mm lvakan m/50 B; 4 × 375 mm (14.8 in) anti-submarine rocket launcher; Depth charges; Mines
- Aircraft carried: 1 helicopter as frigate

The Visby class was a Swedish World War II destroyer class. During the years 1942–1944 four ships, Visby, Sundsvall, Hälsingborg and Kalmar, were built and delivered to the Swedish navy. The ships were a part of Sweden's military buildup during the war. Under this period the ships were used as neutral guards and escort ships. In 1965 the ships were modified and rebuilt as frigates. Two of the ships were decommissioned in 1978 and the last two followed in 1982.

== Orders ==
During the first years of the War Sweden's armed forces went through a massive reinforcement. In 1941, as part of this build-up, the Swedish government ordered four new destroyers for the Swedish navy, of which two were replacements for three destroyers sunk in an explosion on 17 September that year. (Note: The three destroyers sunk at the Naval base at Hårsfjärden near Stockholm on 17 September were Göteborg, Klas Horn and Klas Ugla. Göteborg and Klas Horn were later salvaged and returned to service, while Klas Ugla was scrapped.) The new class would be based on the older Göteborg-class destroyer that were classified as a "Town-class destroyer" and because of this classified as "Modified Town-class destroyers", (modifierad Stadsjagare). In total four ships were built, two at the Götaverken-shipyard and two at the Eriksbergs shipyard.

== Design ==
The design was largely based on the Göteborg-class destroyer, with a similar main armament of three 120 mm (4.7 in) M/24 Bofors guns in three single mounts, but in an improved arrangement, with the second gun mounted aft, firing over the third gun rather than between the funnels as in the earlier destroyers, thus improving fields of fire. Anti-aircraft armament was also improved, consisting of four Bofors 40 mm guns in a twin mount on the ship's centreline between the banks of torpedo tubes, and two single mounts mounted port and starboard further forward. These were supplemented by several 20 mm cannon, (Note: Sources differ as to the number of 20 mm cannon carried. Palmsteirna states two, while Gardiner and Chesneau states three and Whitley states four.) also by Bofors. The ships' torpedo armament remained six 53 cm (21 in) torpedo tubes in two triple mounts. The ships were fitted for minelaying, with up to 20 mines being carried, while anti-submarine armament consisted of four depth charge throwers.

The hull was lengthened compared with the Göteborg class, giving a length between perpendiculars of 95.0 metres (311 ft 8 in) and an overall length of 98 metres (321 ft 6 in) with a beam of 9.0 metres (29 ft 6 in) and a draught of 3.8 metres (12 ft 6 in). Displacement was 1,135 long tons (1,153 t) standard and 1,320 long tons (1,340 t) full load. A square stern was fitted. Like the Göteborg class, the superstructure was built using light alloys to save weight. Three 3-drum boilers fed superheated steam to two de Laval geared steam turbines, driving two shafts and giving 36,000 shaft horsepower (27,000 kW), allowing a speed of 39 knots (72 km/h; 45 mph) to be reached.

== Rebuilds ==
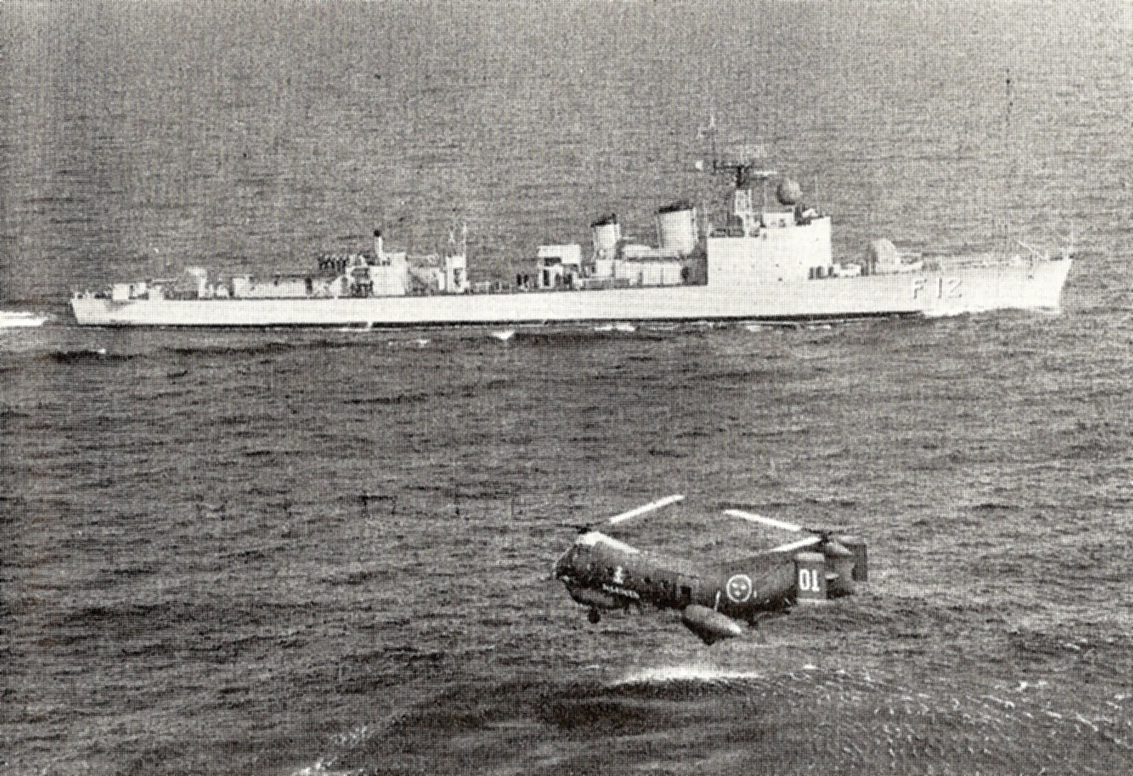
Sundsvall with a Piasecki HkP1 helicopter during the mid-1960s

From 1957 to 1959, Hälsingborg and Kalmar were modified, removing the aft set of torpedo tubes and replacing the forward triple mount with a quintuple set of tubes. From 1964, Visby and Sundsvall underwent a much more expensive reconstruction, being completely rearmed. As recommissioned on 14 October 1966, the two destroyers were armed with two Bofors 57 mm (2.2 in) anti-aircraft guns, one forward and one aft, with a quadruple 375 mm (14.8 in) Bofors anti-submarine rocket launcher replacing the torpedo tubes. The ships' bridges were enlarged and a platform for a helicopter fitted. The ships' radar fit was also updated.

All four ships were redesignated as frigates on 1 January 1965.

== Decommissioning ==
In the 1970s the Swedish government decided that the navy would give up its blue-water navy capacity and become a more coast-based navy. All frigates and destroyers were decommissioned. The first two Visby-class frigates left the navy in 1978 and in 1982 the remaining two followed. HSwMS Visby and HSwMS Sundsvall were used as target ships before being sold to Spain for scrapping.

== Ships ==
Name	Pennant number	Builder	Laid Down	Launched	Commissioned	Fate
Visby	J11	Götaverken	29 April 1942	16 October 1942	10 August 1943	Stricken 1 July 1982, scrapped Spain.
Sundsvall	J12	Eriksberg	1942	20 October 1942	17 September 1943	Stricken 1 July 1982, scrapped Spain 1985
Hälsingborg	J13	Götaverken	1942	23 March 1943	30 November 1943	Stricken 1 July 1978, scrapped 1979
Kalmar	J14	Eriksberg	16 November 1942	20 July 1943	2 February 1944	Stricken 1 July 1978, used as target
