= HSwMS Sundsvall (K24) =

Swedish corvette

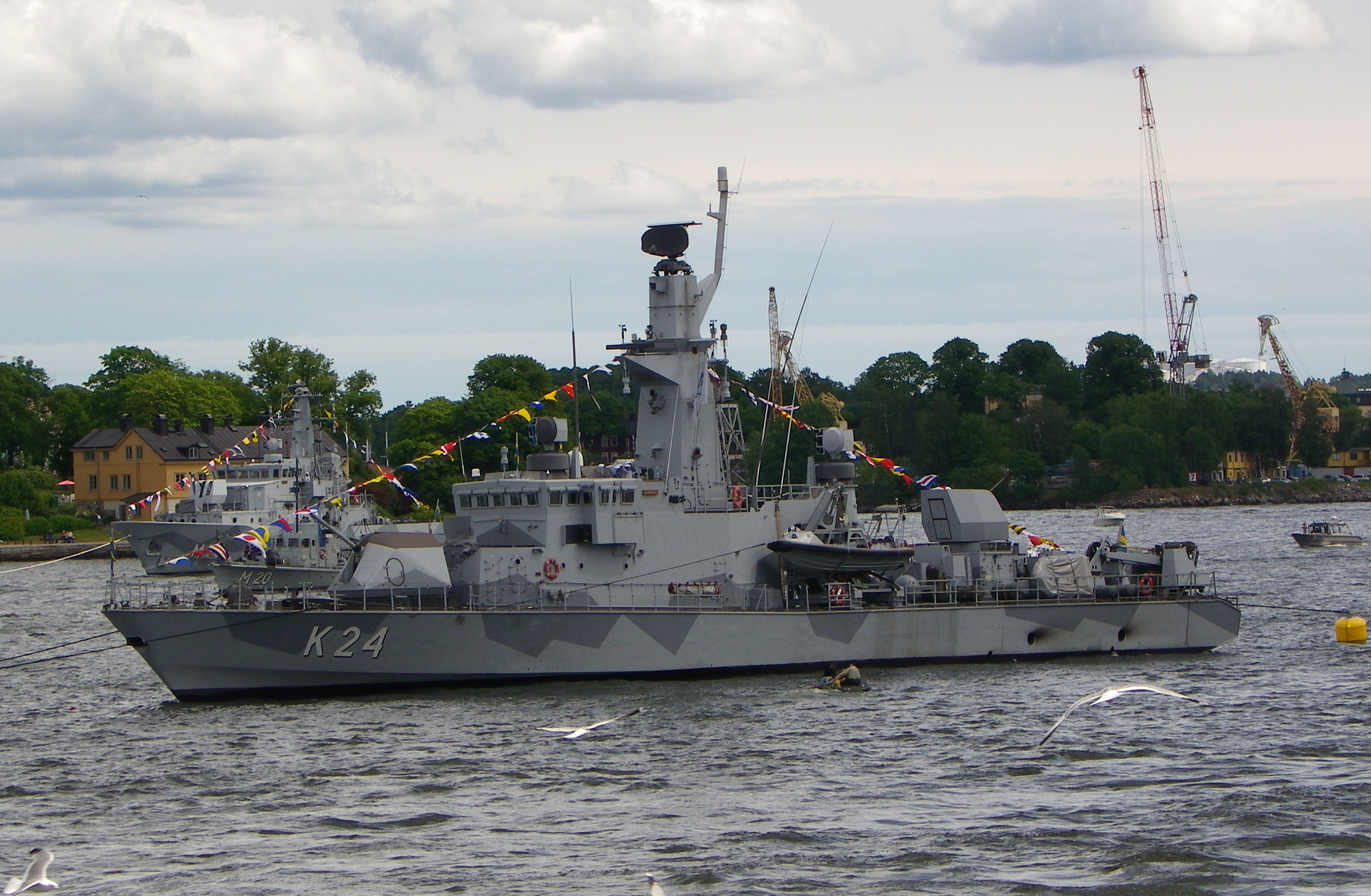
- HSwMS Sundsvall in 2010.

History

Sweden
- Name: Sundsvall
- Namesake: Sundsvall
- Laid down: March 1989
- Launched: 29 November 1991
- Commissioned: 7 June 1993
- Identification: MMSI number: 265500360; Pennant number: K24; Callsign: SCGD
- Badge

General characteristics
- Class & type: Göteborg-class corvette
- Displacement: 380 tons
- Length: 57 m (o/a)
- Beam: 7.5 m
- Draught: 2.6 m
- Speed: 26 knots
- Armament: 1 × 57 mm gun; 1 × 40 mm gun; 40 cm anti-submarine torpedoes; Anti-ship missiles; Anti-submarine grenades; Depth charges; Mines{
- Notes: Alternative armament or combinations of various weapons.

HSwMS Sundsvall (K24) is a Swedish Navy Göteborg-class corvette, named after the northern Swedish coastal city of Sundsvall. The ship was launched in 1991 and entered naval service in 1993.

Together with its sister ship HSwMS Gävle, HSwMS Sundsvall took part in the United Nations operation off the coast of Lebanon following the 2006 war between Israel and Hezbollah.

The ship was modified between 2018 and 2022 and returned to active service in December 2022; the class was renamed the Gävle class. The modification included new modern sensors, and a new command bridge. The aft 40mm canon was removed and replaced by a new deckhouse.
