= HSwMS Göteborg (K21) =

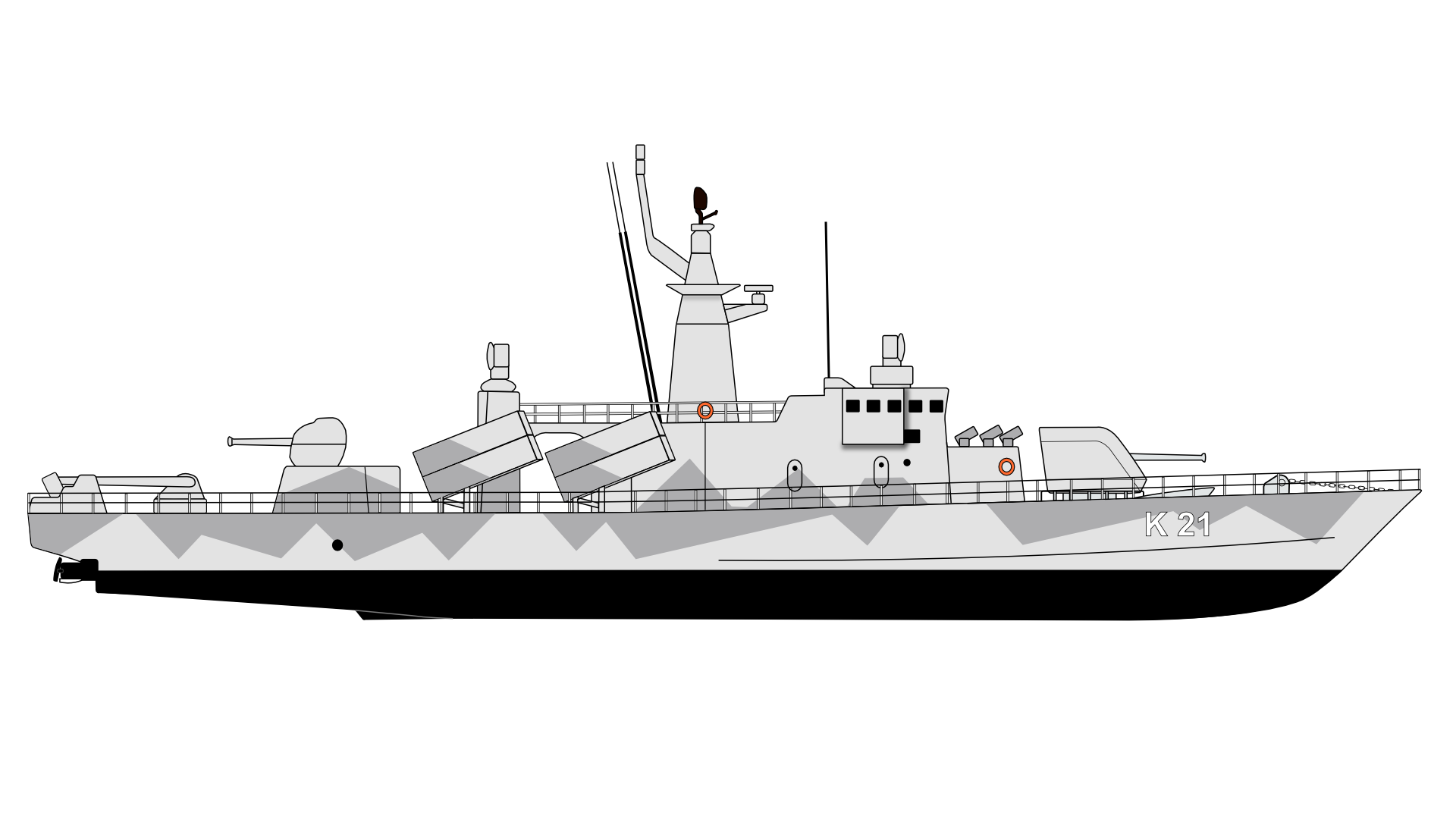
- HSwMS Göteborg

History

Sweden
- Name: Göteborg
- Namesake: Göteborg
- Builder: Karlskrona
- Laid down: 10 February 1986
- Launched: 13 April 1989
- Commissioned: 15 February 1990
- Identification: Pennant number: K21
- Status: Decommissioned
- Badge

General characteristics
- Class & type: Göteborg-class corvette
- Displacement: 380 tons
- Length: 57 m (187 ft 0 in) (o/a)
- Beam: 7.5 m (24 ft 7 in)
- Draught: 2.6 m (8 ft 6 in)
- Speed: 26 knots (48 km/h; 30 mph)
- Armament: 1 × 57 mm (2.2 in) gun; 1 × 40 mm (1.6 in) gun; 40 cm anti-submarine torpedoes; Anti-ship missiles; Anti-submarine grenades; Depth charges; Mines
- Notes: Alternative armament or combinations of various weapons.

HSwMS Göteborg (K21) is a Swedish Navy Göteborg-class corvette, named after the Swedish city of Göteborg.

== Development and design ==
The Göteborg class is a class of corvettes in the Swedish Navy, built between 1986 and 1993. The class was originally designed to destroy Soviet submarines and surface vessels, and is armed with eight RBS-15 anti-ship missiles, torpedoes, one 57 mm cannon and one 40 mm cannon.

HSwMS Sundsvall and HSwMS Gävle will receive modification in 2019–2020. After the modification the corvettes will be named Gävle class.

== Construction and career ==
The ship was launched on 13 April 1989 at Karlskrona and entered naval service on 15 February 1990.
