= Gustaf von Hofsten =

Swedish Navy officer (born 1942)

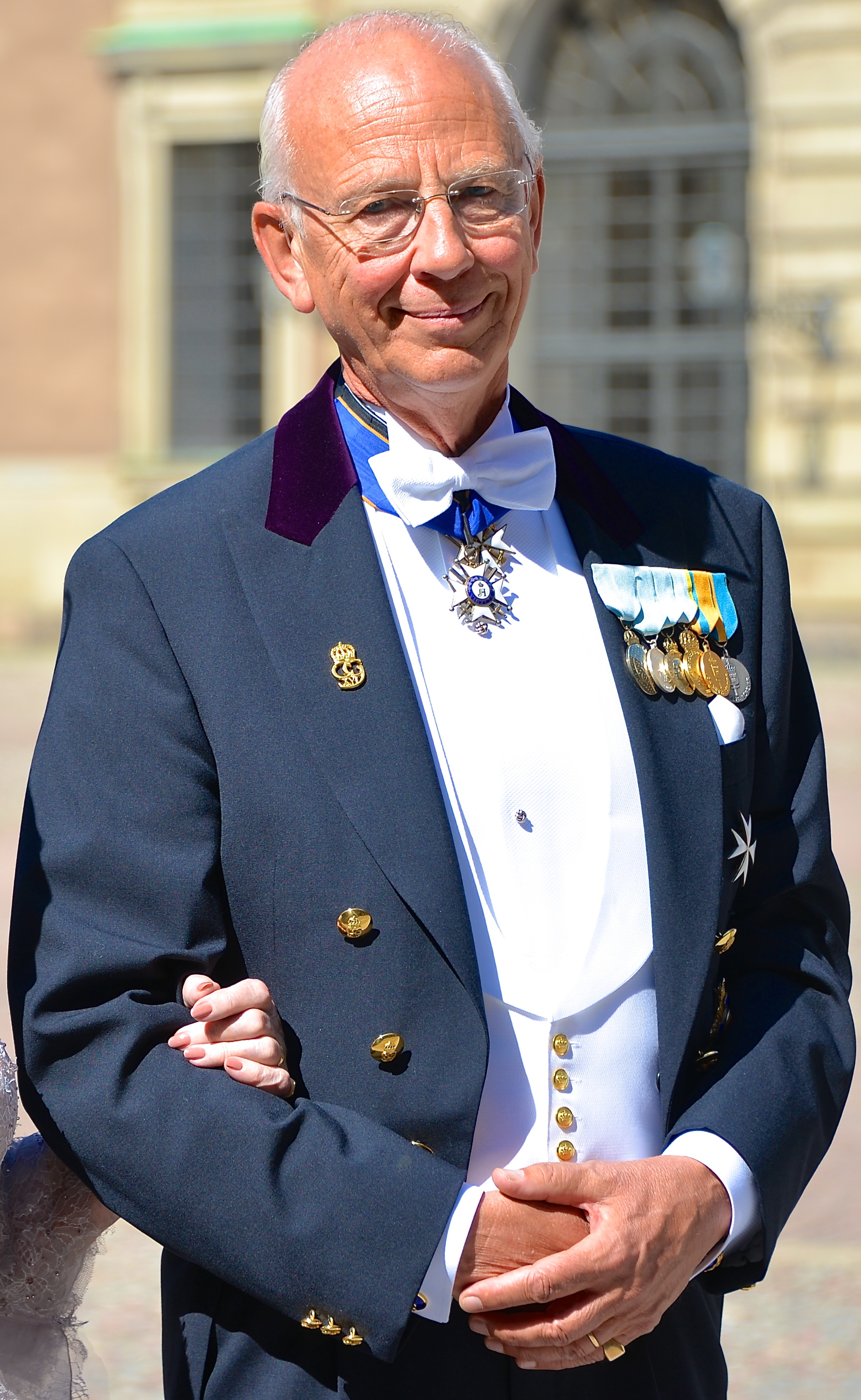
- von Hofsten in 2013
- Born: Fritz Gustaf von Hofsten; 22 May 1942 (age 84); Örebro, Sweden
- Military career
- Allegiance: Sweden
- Branch: Swedish Navy
- Service years: 1964–1999
- Rank: Senior captain

Senior Captain Fritz Gustaf von Hofsten (born 22 May 1942) is a retired Swedish Navy officer and court official. He graduated from the Royal Swedish Naval Academy in 1964 and began his career in the Swedish Naval Quartermaster Corps. During his early years, he served aboard mine warfare vessels and in various naval divisions, later taking on several quartermaster and staff positions within the Swedish Armed Forces.

Rising steadily through the ranks, von Hofsten held key administrative and leadership roles, including head of sections within the Swedish Defence Materiel Administration, staff quartermaster of the Coastal Fleet, and head of a department in the Defence Staff's Operations Directorate. He was promoted to commander in 1984 and to captain (navy) in 1987. From 1993 to 1999, he served at the Swedish Armed Forces Headquarters as head of leadership development and deputy chief of personnel, achieving the rank of senior captain in 1994 before retiring early in 1999.

In addition to his military career, von Hofsten was aide-de-camp to King Carl XVI Gustaf (1980–1986) and later served as Marshal of the Court and head of Princess Lilian's household (2011–2013). He has been active in professional and historical military organizations, including the Royal Swedish Society of Naval Sciences and the Swedish Military History Library.

== Early life ==
von Hofsten was born on 22 May 1942 in Olaus Petri Parish in Örebro County, Sweden, the son of Major Fritz von Hofsten and Countess Elsa Wachtmeister af Johannishus. His older brother was Commander Hans von Hofsten. von Hofsten is the great-grandson of mill owner Erland von Hofsten.

== Career ==
von Hofsten graduated from the Royal Swedish Naval Academy in 1964, earning his naval officer's commission, and was the same year appointed acting sub-lieutenant in the Swedish Naval Quartermaster Corps. During his first five years of service, he worked as a ship and unit quartermaster aboard mine warfare vessels, served with the 11th Torpedo Boat Division (11. torpedbåtsdivisionen) and the 1st Destroyer Flotilla (1. jagarflottiljen), and was also a cadet officer at the Royal Swedish Naval Academy. He was promoted to sub-lieutenant in 1966.

From 1969 to 1970, he served on the staff of the Quartermaster Corps of the Swedish Armed Forces, and in 1970 as regimental quartermaster at the Göta Life Guards. Between 1970 and 1972, he was corps quartermaster at the Roslagen Air Corps. Promoted to lieutenant in 1972, he attended the Naval Staff Course at the Swedish Armed Forces Staff College from 1972 to 1974.

From 1974 to 1976, he was head of a section in the Quartermaster Division of the Swedish Defence Materiel Administration and was promoted to major in 1975. He then served as deputy head of the Materiel Unit at the Life Guard Dragoons and the Stockholm Defence District (1977–1978), and from 1978 to 1981 as staff quartermaster with the Coastal Fleet. Between 1981 and 1984, he was head of a department in the Operations Directorate of the Defence Staff.

In 1984, he was promoted to commander and returned to the Swedish Defence Materiel Administration, where he served as unit head in the Quartermaster Division (1984–1986) and deputy head of the Procurement Division (1986–1991). He was promoted to captain (navy) in 1987. From 1991 to 1993, he was section head at the Defence Staff, and finally, from 1993 to 1999, he served as head of leadership development at the Swedish Armed Forces Headquarters, as well as deputy chief of personnel for the Armed Forces. He was promoted to senior captain in 1994 and took early retirement in 1999.

From 1980 to 1986, von Hofsten served as aide-de-camp to King Carl XVI Gustaf, and from 2011 to 2013, he was Marshal of the Court and head of Princess Lilian, Duchess of Halland's household. He was elected a member of the Royal Swedish Society of Naval Sciences in 1981 and served on its board from 1986 to 1998. Since 2005, he has been a member of the board of the Svenskt Militärhistoriskt Bibliotek.

== Personal life ==
In February 1970, von Hofsten was engaged to Charlotte Colliander (born 1945), the daughter of Colonel Bengt Colliander and his wife Yvonne De Geer. They married on 12 September 1970 in Kviinge Church in Hanaskog. The wedding was performed by the court minister, Baron Kjell Barnekow. They had one daughter, Maria, which was born on 27 October 1973 at Danderyd Hospital. A son was born on 28 March 1976 at Danderyd Hospital.

== Dates of rank ==
- 1964 – Acting sub-lieutenant
- 1966 – Sub-lieutenant
- 1972 – Lieutenant
- 1975 – Major
- 1984 – Commander
- 1987 – Captain
- 1994 – Senior captain

== Awards and decorations ==
=== Swedish ===
- (Sweden) H. M. The King's Medal, 8th size gold (silver-gilt) medal worn on the chest suspended by the Order of the Seraphim ribbon (1987)
- (Sweden) King Carl XVI Gustaf's Jubilee Commemorative Medal (30 April 1996)
- (Sweden) Crown Princess Victoria and Prince Daniel's Wedding Commemorative Medal (19 June 2010)
- (Sweden) For Zealous and Devoted Service of the Realm
- (Sweden) Swedish Armed Forces Reserve Officer Medal i guld
- (Sweden) Swedish Armed Forces Conscript Medal
- Knight of the Order of Saint John in Sweden with star
- (Sweden) Royal Swedish Society of Naval Sciences Medal of Merit in Gold (29 September 2010)
- (Sweden) Royal Swedish Society of Naval Sciences Medal of Merit in Silver (1999)
- (Sweden) Knight of the Sovereign Military Order of the Temple of Jerusalem (June 1995)

=== Foreign ===
- (Luxembourg) Commander of the Order of Adolphe of Nassau

== Bibliography ==
- Sundberg, Ulf; Hofsten, Gustaf von; Svärd, Samuel (2021). 7 december 1941: det japanska överraskningsanfallet på den amerikanska flottbasen vid Pearl Harbor (in Swedish). [Stockholm]: Svenskt militärhistoriskt biblioteks förlag. ISBN 9789188885531. SELIBR 2h32t8p60pdzbd0f.
- Sundberg, Ulf; Hofsten, Gustaf von; Svärd, Samuel (2021). Slagskepp under andra världskriget: giganternas kamp om sjöherravälde (in Swedish). [Stockholm]: Svenskt militärhistoriskt biblioteks förlag. ISBN 9789188885425. SELIBR 3hkdtwzf1fslt5zs.
- Hofsten, Gustaf von, ed. (2021). I fred & örlog: svensk och engelsk sjömakt under 500 år : en antologi (in Swedish). [Göteborg]: Breakwater Publishing. ISBN 9789186687700. SELIBR 8nzd2171606br5fb.
- Zetterberg, Kent; Hofsten, Gustaf von; Svärd, Samuel (2020). Jagarincidenten vid Färöarna 1940: brittiskt försök att beslagta svenska örlogsfartyg (in Swedish). [Stockholm]: Svenskt militärhistoriskt biblioteks förlag. ISBN 9789188885227. SELIBR 7kxw9mkp5fcclqw7.
- Zetterberg, Kent; Hofsten, Gustaf von (2019). Svenska flottans storhetstid under kalla kriget: en maktfaktor i Östersjön (in Swedish). [Stockholm]: Svenskt militärhistoriskt biblioteks förlag. ISBN 9789188885159. SELIBR mxj07h3wkwz1mm8n.
- Zetterberg, Kent; Hofsten, Gustaf von (2018). Svensk sjömakt under 500 år: flottan från Gustav Vasa till Carl XVI Gustaf (in Swedish). [Stockholm]: Svenskt militärhistoriskt bibliotek. ISBN 9789188053763. SELIBR 22667427.
- Hofsten, Gustaf von; Rosenius, Frank, eds. (2016) [2009]. Kustflottan: de svenska sjöstridskrafterna under 1900-talet. Marinlitteraturföreningen, 0348-2405; 94Forum navales skriftseries, 1650-1837; 34 (in Swedish) (2nd ed.). Stockholm: Svenskt militärhistoriskt biblioteks förlag. ISBN 9789188053404. SELIBR 20007408.
- Hofsten, Gustaf von; Rosenius, Frank, eds. (2009). Kustflottan: de svenska sjöstridskrafterna under 1900-talet. Marinlitteraturföreningen, 0348-2405; 94Forum navales skriftseries, 1650-1837; 34 (in Swedish). Stockholm: Kungliga Örlogsmannasällskapet. ISBN 9789197797313. SELIBR 11621245.
- Hofsten, Erland von; Hofsten, Gustaf von (2008). Med sjön i blodet: minnen från ett halvsekel i sjöfartens tjänst (in Swedish). Skärhamn: Båtdokgruppen. ISBN 9789187360398. SELIBR 11311517.
- Areschoug, Richard; Hofsten, Gustaf von (2008). Dödlig resa: [svenska handelsflottans förluster 1939-1945] (in Swedish). Stockholm: Svenskt Militärhistoriskt bibliotek. ISBN 9789185789269. SELIBR 11271373.
- Hofsten, Gustaf von; Waernberg, Jan; Ohlsson, Curt S. (2003). Örlogsfartyg: svenska maskindrivna fartyg under tretungad flagg. [Forum navales skriftseries], 1650-1837; [6] (in Swedish). Stockholm: Svenskt militärhistoriskt bibl. i samarbete med Marinlitteratur. ISBN 919743843X. SELIBR 8873330.

== Honours ==
- Member of the Royal Swedish Society of Naval Sciences (1981)
