= Göteborg-class corvette =

Ship class

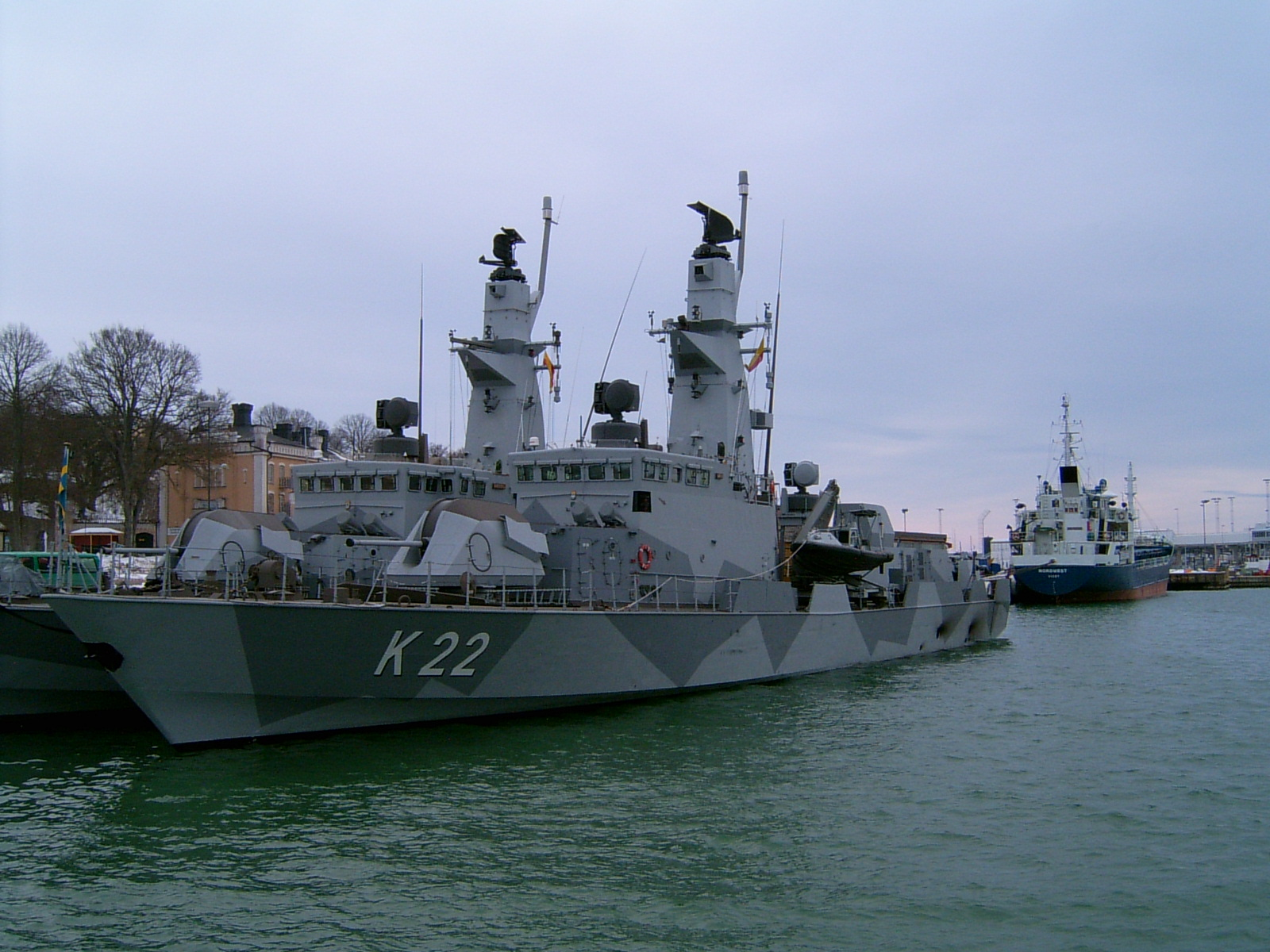
- HSwMS Gävle in Visby harbour in 2006

Class overview
- Name: Göteborg class
- Builders: Karlskronavarvet AB
- Operators: Swedish Navy
- Preceded by: Stockholm class
- Succeeded by: Visby class
- Subclasses: Gävle class
- In commission: 13 April 1989
- Planned: 6
- Completed: 4
- Canceled: 2
- Active: 2
- Retired: 2

General characteristics
- Type: Corvette
- Displacement: 380/425 tonnes
- Length: 57 m (187 ft 0 in)
- Beam: 8 m (26 ft 3 in)
- Draft: 2.5 m (8 ft 2 in)
- Propulsion: 3 × MTU diesel engines at 2,560 kW (3,430 hp)/each; Water jet propulsion system
- Speed: 30 knots (56 km/h; 35 mph)
- Range: 3,704 km (2,000 nmi; 2,302 mi)
- Complement: 23 officers; 18 seamen
- Sensors & processing systems: Sea Giraffe radar; PN621 navigation radar; 2 × fire control radar sights (SAAB); CS-3701; Simrad SS 304 Spira HMS (hull-mounted sonar); STN Atlas Elektronik TAS (towed array sonar); Thales TSM 2643 Salmon VDS (variable depth sonar) (former); Kongsberg ST2400 VDS (variable depth sonar) (after upgrade)
- Electronic warfare & decoys: Rheinmetall TKWA/MASS (Multi Ammunition Softkill System)
- Armament: 1 × Bofors 57 mm Mk2 gun (Upgraded to Mk3); 1 × Bofors 40 mm/L70 gun (removed on Gävle class); 8 × RBS15 MkII anti-ship missile; 4 × 400 mm tubes for Type 43/45 torpedoes; 4 × ELMA anti-submarine mortars; Mines & depth charges

The Göteborg class is a class of corvettes in the Swedish Navy, built between 1986 and 1993. The class was originally designed to destroy Soviet submarines and surface vessels, and is armed with eight RBS-15 anti-ship missiles, torpedoes, one 57 mm cannon, and one 40 mm cannon.

The Swedish Navy originally planned to acquire six Göteborg-class corvettes, but following the collapse of the Soviet Union in 1991, the final two were cancelled.

Two of the four corvettes built remained in service as of 2021. Modified in 2019, the two vessels form the subclass Gävle class. Both vessels, HSwMS Gävle and HSwMS Sundsvall, took part in a United Nations operation off the coast of Lebanon in 2006 and 2007, following the 2006 Lebanon War.

== Gävle subclass ==
Sundsvall and Gävle were modified in 2019–2022. After the modification, the remaining ships were given the subclass name, the Gävle class, as HSwMS Göteborg had been mothballed. During the upgrade the corvettes received new equipment bringing them to the same standard as the Visby class, a significant step in terms of capabilities.

== Units ==
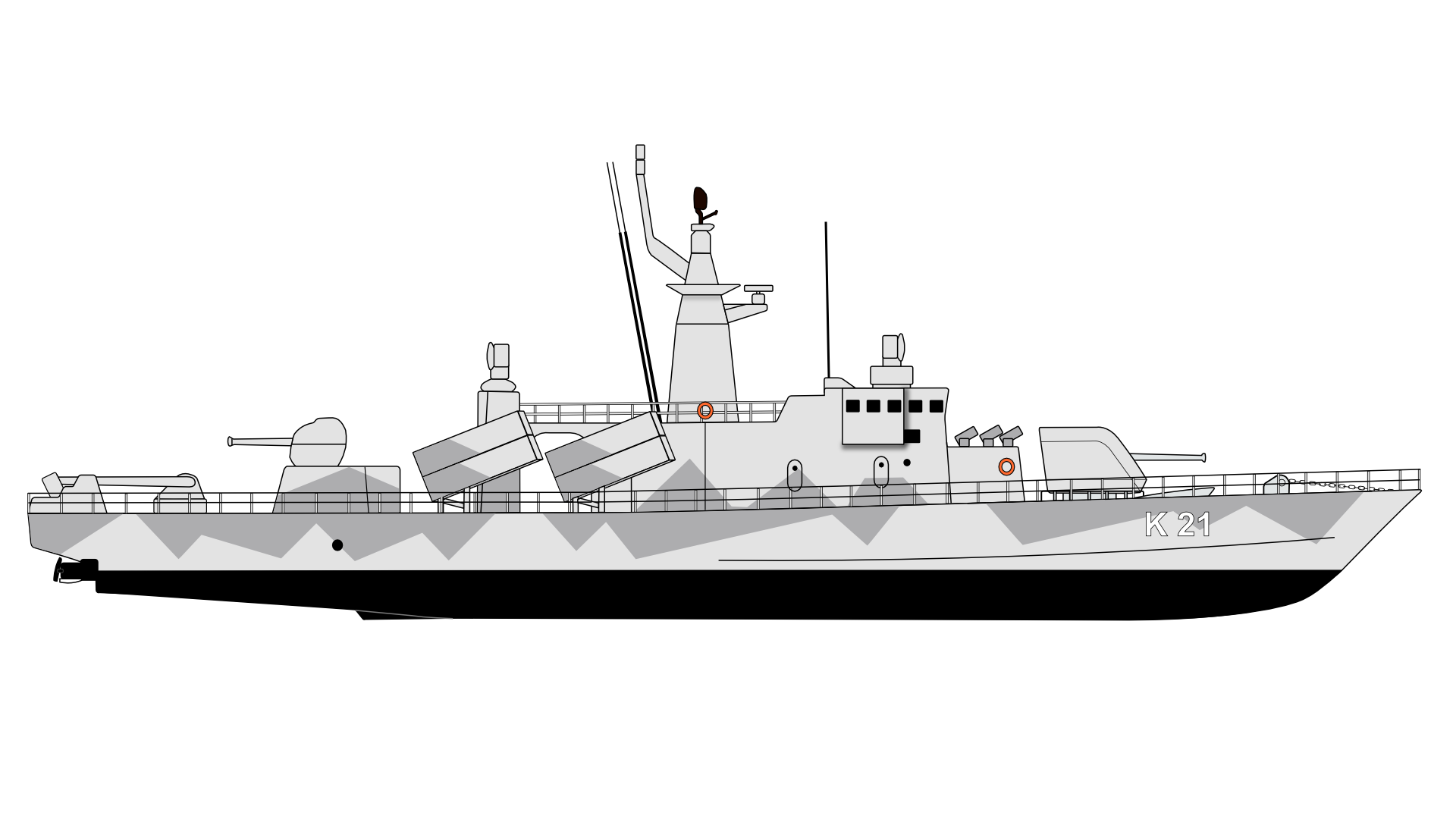
A lateral diagram of HSwMS Göteborg

Bow number	Ship name	Namesake	Laid down	Launched	Commissioned	Service	Status
K21	Göteborg	Gothenburg	10 February 1986	13 April 1989	15 February 1990	4th Naval Warfare Flotilla	Decommissioned/mothballed
K22	Gävle	Gävle	12 January 1987	23 March 1990	17 September 1990	4th Naval Warfare Flotilla	Active
K23	Kalmar	Kalmar	21 September 1988	1 November 1990	1 September 1991	4th Naval Warfare Flotilla	Decommissioned/mothballed
K24	Sundsvall	Sundsvall	March 1989	29 November 1991	7 June 1993	4th Naval Warfare Flotilla	Active
K25	Helsingborg	Helsingborg	Cancelled				
K26	Härnösand	Härnösand	Cancelled				
