= M1917 Browning machine gun =

Browning model 1917
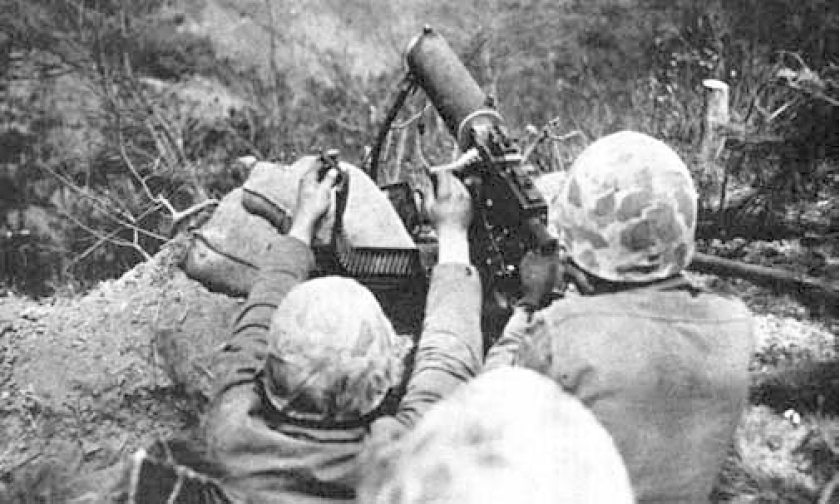
- Marines operating a M1917A1 Browning during the Korean War
- Type: Heavy machine gun
- Place of origin: United States

Service history
- In service: 1917–1970s
- Used by: See Users
- Wars: World War I; Mexican Revolution; Banana Wars; Chaco War; World War II; Chinese Civil War; Korean War; First Indochina War; Congo Crisis; Vietnam War; Cambodian Civil War

Production history
- Designer: John M. Browning
- Designed: 1917
- Produced: 1917–45
- No. built: 128,369
- Variants: M1917, M1917A1, Colt models

Specifications
- Mass: 103 lb (47 kg) (gun, tripod, water, and ammunition)
- Length: 980 mm
- Barrel length: 24 in (609 mm)
- Cartridge: .30-06 Springfield Other cartridges: 6.5×54mm Greek; 6.5×55mm Swedish; 7.5×54mm French; 7×57mm Mauser; 7.62×51mm NATO; 7.65×53mm Mauser; 7.92×57mm Mauser; 7.92×61mm; 8×52mmR Siam; 8×63mm
- Action: Recoil-operated automatic
- Rate of fire: 450 round/min, 600 round/min for M1917A1
- Muzzle velocity: 2,800 ft/s (853.6 m/s)
- Feed system: 250 round fabric belt

The M1917 Browning machine gun is a heavy machine gun used by the United States armed forces in World War I, World War II, the Korean War, and the Vietnam War; it has also been used by other nations. It was a crew-served, belt-fed, water-cooled machine gun that served alongside the much lighter air-cooled Browning M1919. It was used at the battalion level, and often mounted on vehicles (such as a jeep). There were two main iterations: the M1917, which was used in World War I and the M1917A1, which was used thereafter. The M1917, which was used on some aircraft as well as in a ground role, had a cyclic rate of 450 rounds per minute. The M1917A1 had a cyclic rate of 450 to 600 rounds per minute.

== Design and development ==
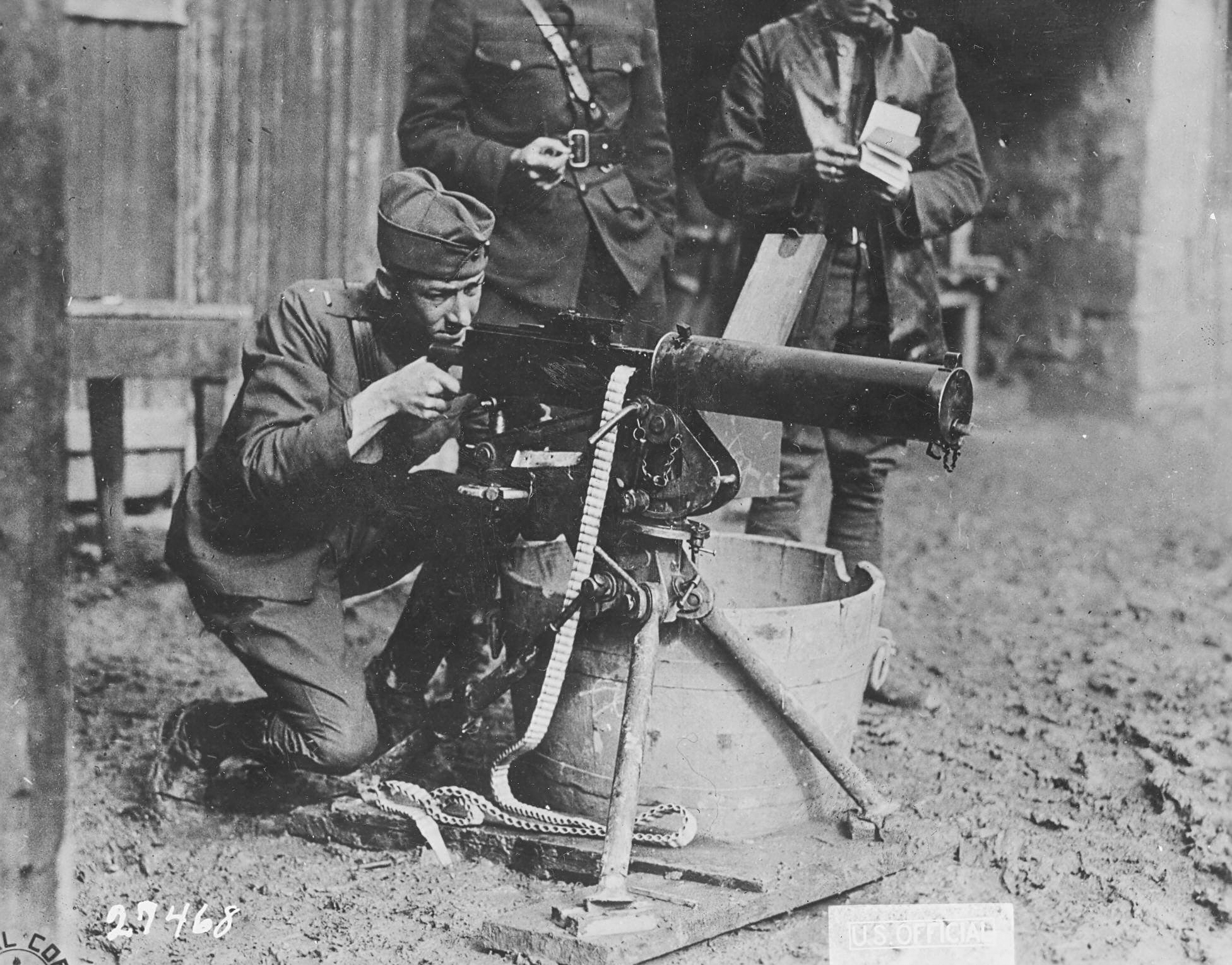
US Army 2nd Lt. Valmore A. Browning test firing a Browning machine gun. This gun was used in the Argonne Sector.

In 1900, John Moses Browning filed a patent for a recoil-powered automatic gun. Browning did not work on the gun again until 1910, when he built a water-cooled prototype of the 1900 design. Although the gun worked well, Browning improved the design slightly: he replaced side ejection with bottom ejection, added a buffer for smoother operation, replaced the hammer with a two-piece firing pin, and made some other minor improvements. The basic design of the gun was still the 1900 design.

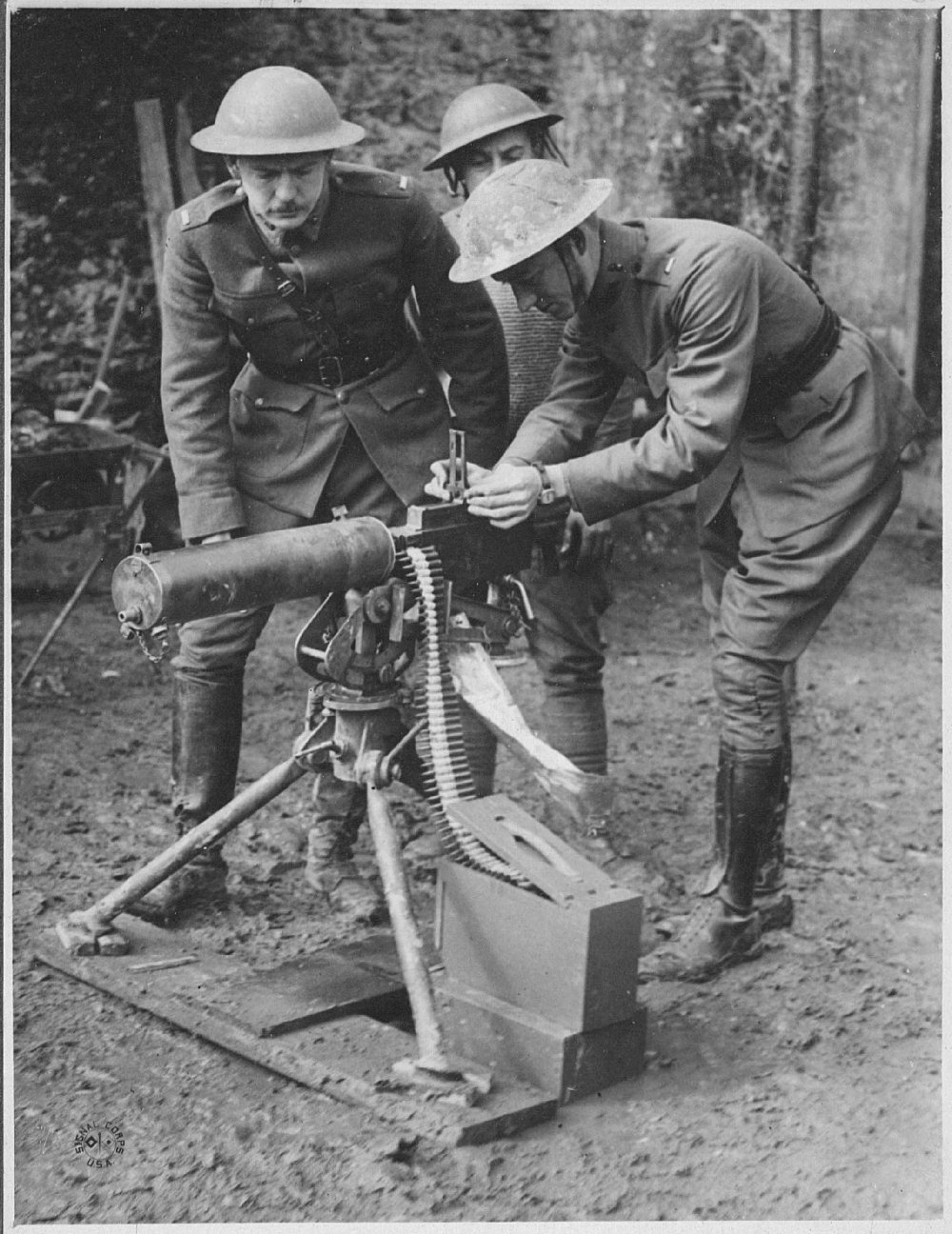
Val Browning, the inventor's son, demonstrates the M1917.

The Browning is a water-cooled heavy machine gun, though some experimental versions were made that did not use a water jacket; the air-cooled M1919 was later developed as a medium machine gun. Unlike many other early machine guns, the M1917 had nothing to do with Maxim's toggle lock design. At 47 pounds (21 kg), it was much lighter than contemporary Maxim type guns such as the first 137-pound (62 kg) German Maschinengewehr 08 (08/15 model: 43 lb (20 kg)) and similar to the British Vickers machine gun, while still being highly reliable. The similarities with the Maxim and the Vickers are the principles of recoil operation, T-slot breechblock, "pull-out" belt feed, water cooling, and forward ejection. The Browning's sliding-block locking mechanism, used in many previous Browning design, saved weight and complexity. The belt fed left-to-right, and the cartridges were stacked closer together than Maxim/Vickers.

The Army Ordnance Department showed little interest in machine guns until war was declared in April 1917. At that time, the U.S. arsenal included only 1,100 machine guns, and most of those were outmoded. The government asked several designers to submit weapons. Browning arranged a test at the Springfield Armory in May 1917. In the first test, the weapon fired 20,000 rounds with only a few malfunctions mostly related to poorly loaded cloth belts. The reliability was so exceptional that Browning fired another 20,000 rounds through the weapon for only one broken part: a sear failed at about 39,500 rounds fired. The Ordnance Board was impressed, but was unconvinced that the same level of performance could be achieved in a production model. Consequently, Browning used a second gun that not only duplicated the original trial, but it also fired continuously for 48 minutes and 12 seconds (over 21,000 rounds).

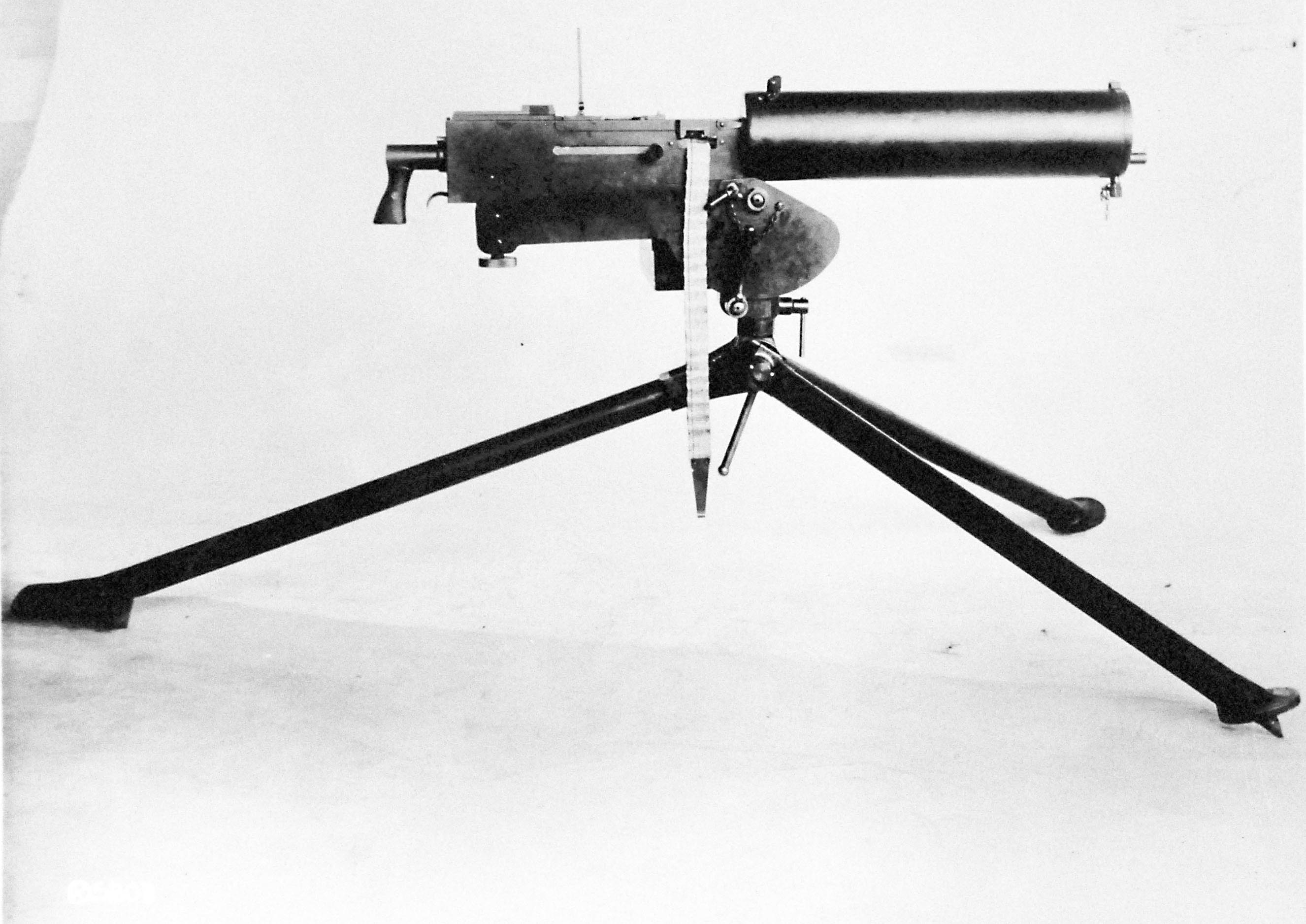
M1917 mounted on tripod

The Army adopted the weapon as its principal heavy machine gun, utilizing the M1906 .30-06 cartridge with a 150-grain, flat-base bullet. Production was complex as the several manufacturers producing the guns needed to establish assembly lines and create tooling. By 30 June 1918, Westinghouse had made only 2,500 and Remington had made only 1,600. By the time of the Armistice, Westinghouse had made 30,150, Remington 12,000, and Colt 600.

Until the start of World War I, the Army had used a variety of older machine guns, including the Browning-designed M1895 "Potato Digger", the Maxim Gun, the Benet–Mercie M1909, and the Hotchkiss M1914 machine gun. Although the Model 1917 was intended to be the principal US Army heavy machine gun in the war, the Army was forced to purchase many foreign weapons—the French-produced Hotchkiss 8 mm machine gun was actually the most common heavy machine gun used by the American Expeditionary Force.

In 1926, the Browning's rear sight was revised to incorporate scales for both the new M1 Ball (172-grain boat-tail bullet) and the M1906 (150-grain flat-base bullet) ammunition. With M1 ball, the M1917 had a maximum range of about 5,500 yd (5,000 m); with M2 ammunition, about 3,500 yd (3,200 m). The rear sight had a battle sight as well as a raised leaf-type sight suitable for employment against either ground or air targets.

== Service ==
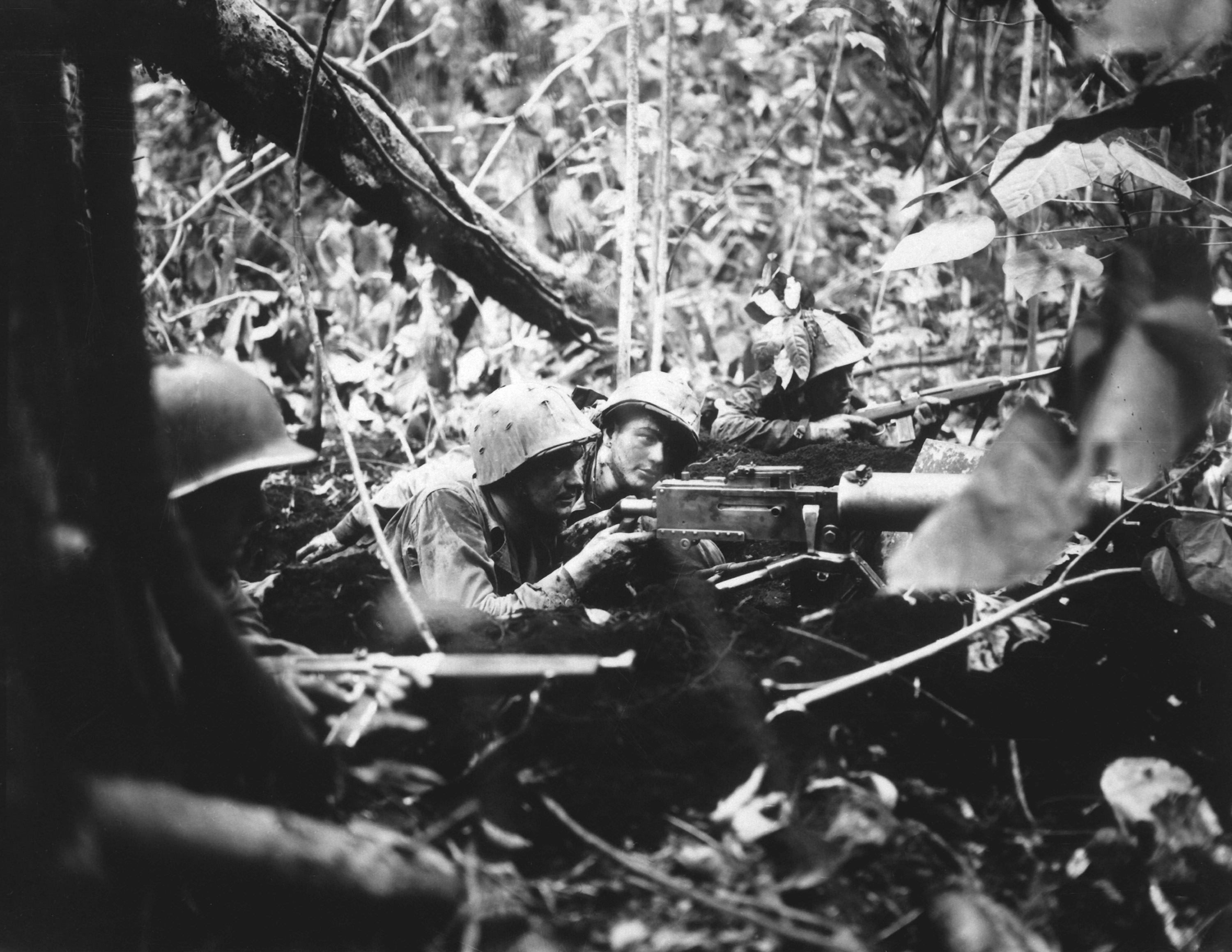
Marines push back a Japanese counterattack during the Battle of Cape Gloucester in 1944.

The M1917 saw limited service in the later days of World War I. Because of production delays, only about 1,200 Model 1917s saw combat in the conflict, and then only in the last 2 1/2 months of the war. Some arrived too late for combat service. For example, the 6th Machine Gun Battalion, fighting as part of the Second Division, did not exchange their Hotchkiss M1914 machine guns for Browning M1917 machine guns until 14 November, three days after the armistice. The U.S. equipped about a third of the divisions sent to France; the others were equipped equally with Hotchkiss machine guns bought from the French or the British Vickers machine guns built by Colt in the US. Where the Model 1917 did see action, its rate of fire and reliability were highly effective. The M1917 weapon system was inferior to the Vickers and Hotchkiss guns in indirect fire applications because the British and French cartridges had about 50 percent longer range than the M1906 cartridge, the .30-06 service cartridge used in World War I. (This was because of the inefficient aerodynamics of the M1906 cartridge's bullet, later fixed in the bullet of the M1 ball cartridge.)

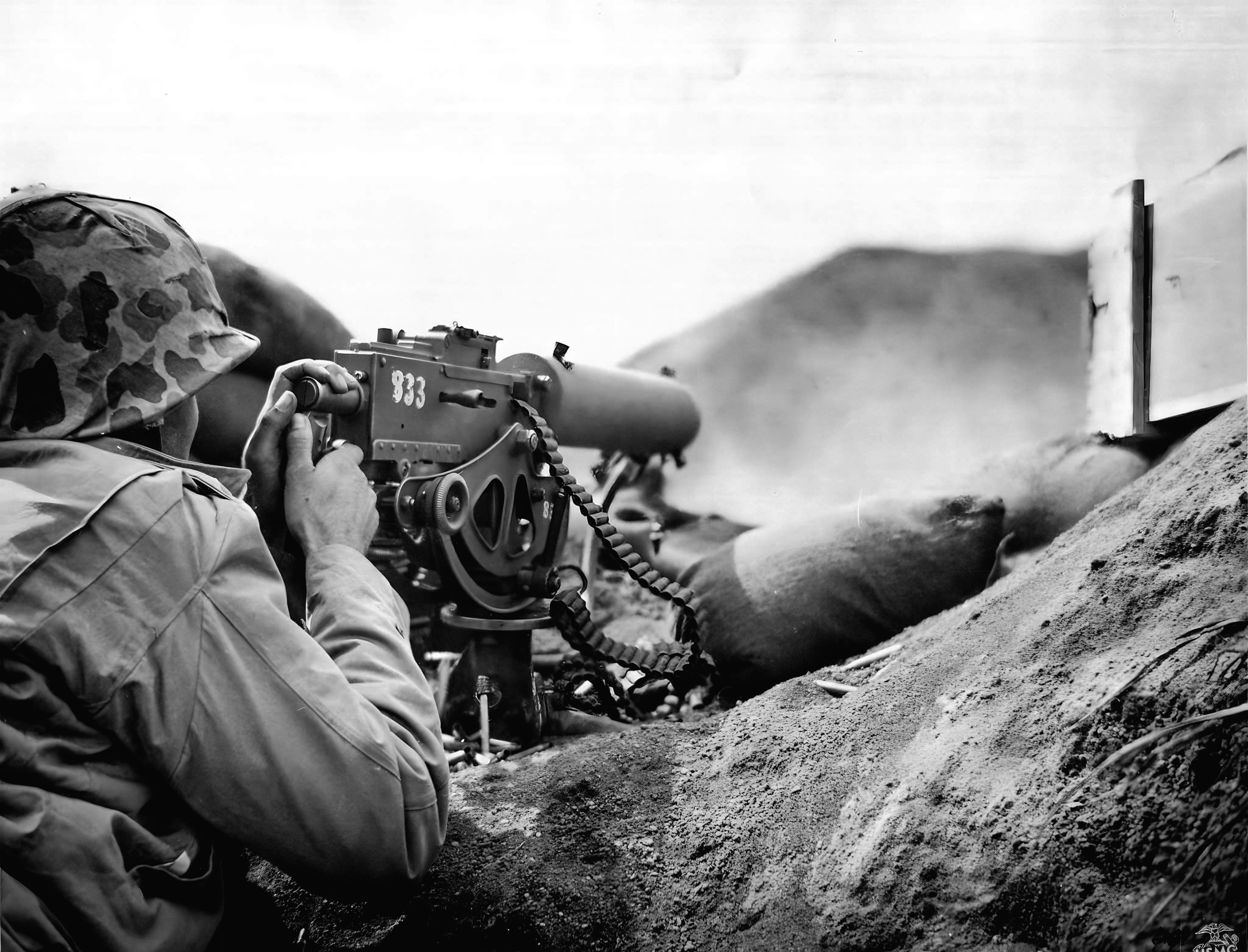
A U.S. Marine firing Browning M1917A1 machine gun during the Battle of Iwo Jima

The Model 1917A1 was again used in the Second World War, and was primarily used with the M2 ball, tracer, and armor-piercing ammunition introduced just prior to the outbreak of hostilities. Some were supplied to the UK for use by the Home Guard since all production of the .303 Vickers was needed to resupply the equipment abandoned during the Fall of France. The M1917's weight and bulk meant that it was generally employed as a fixed defense or as a battalion or regimental support weapon. In this latter role, the disassembled weapon was carried by machine gun squads advancing on foot, which could rapidly deploy it to support the infantry in offensive operations. At the battle of Momote Airstrip in the Admiralties, the US Army's 5th Cavalry machine gunners killed several hundred Japanese in one night using their M1917 Brownings; one gun was left in position after the battle as a memorial to the desperate struggle.

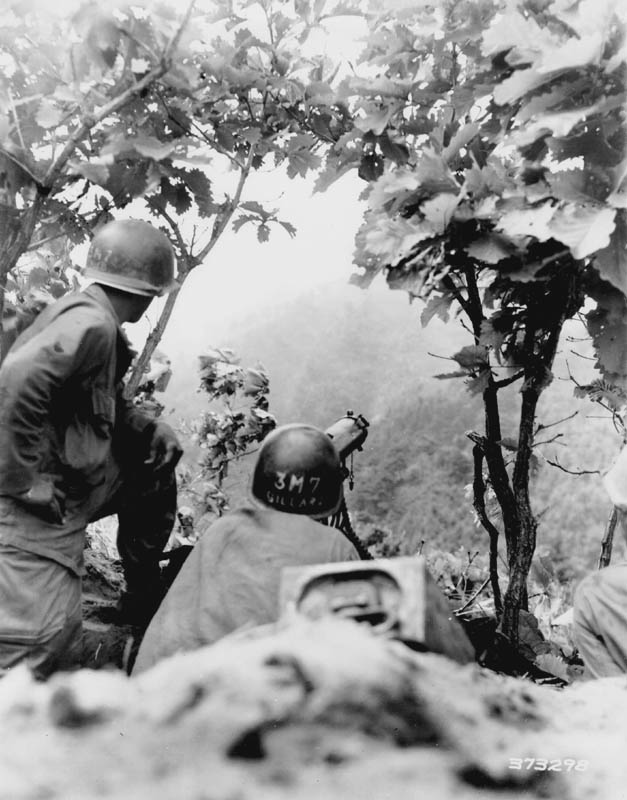
A Browning M1917 in action during the Korean War.

The Model 1917 was called to service again in the Korean War. On at least one occasion, U.S. soldiers in the Korean War urinated on the gun when water-cooling had failed in the frigid temperatures of the Korean winter. The Model 1917 was slowly phased out of military service in the late-1960s in favor of the much lighter M60 machine gun chambered in the new 7.62 mm NATO cartridge.

Many of the 1917s were given to South Vietnam. The last ones in regular US service were on the machine gun infiltration course at Fort Benning, Georgia, where their sustained-fire capability was an advantage in long nights of shooting over the heads of low-crawling trainees. The gun did continue to see service in some Third World armies well into the latter half of the 20th century. Some are still in use today by irregular military forces because the water cooled barrel allows for long periods of sustained fire.

== M1917 and M1917A1 ammunition chests ==
The machine gun used a wooden ammunition chest that carried 250 rounds. The early M1917 model had an angled corner and a leather strap handle on top. The later M1917A1 model had a square corner and a cloth strap handle on top.

The wooden ammunition belt chest was replaced during WWII by the expendable metal box ammunition M1 adopted 6 May 1942. On 20 June 1945, a modified version known as the M1A1 was adopted. The M1A1 had a spring-loaded catch to fasten it to the M1917A1 tripod more securely and provide a better watertight seal. In the late-1940s the M19 box replaced the earlier metal M1 and M1A1 boxes, and a modified version known as the M19A1 appeared in the early-1950s and continues in use today.

== Variants ==
=== US military variants ===
==== M1917 ====
The original gun suffered from a weakness related to the design of the receiver. Under field conditions, the bottom plates, which were dovetailed into the gun's two side plates, tore out. An early fix was to attach a roughly horseshoe-shaped steel bracket around the rearmost part of the receiver. A later fix was to rivet "stirrups" (right-angled steel pieces) to the bottom and side plates. The stirrup fix became the standard reinforcement until a more permanent fix for the problem was developed. Another reported problem was bulging in the side plates, which was probably caused by stresses put into the side plates when hammering the dovetails closed. The 1917 also had a simple sliding safety that blocked the trigger when moved to the far right position. These were removed as part of post-war refurbishment.

==== M1917A1 ====
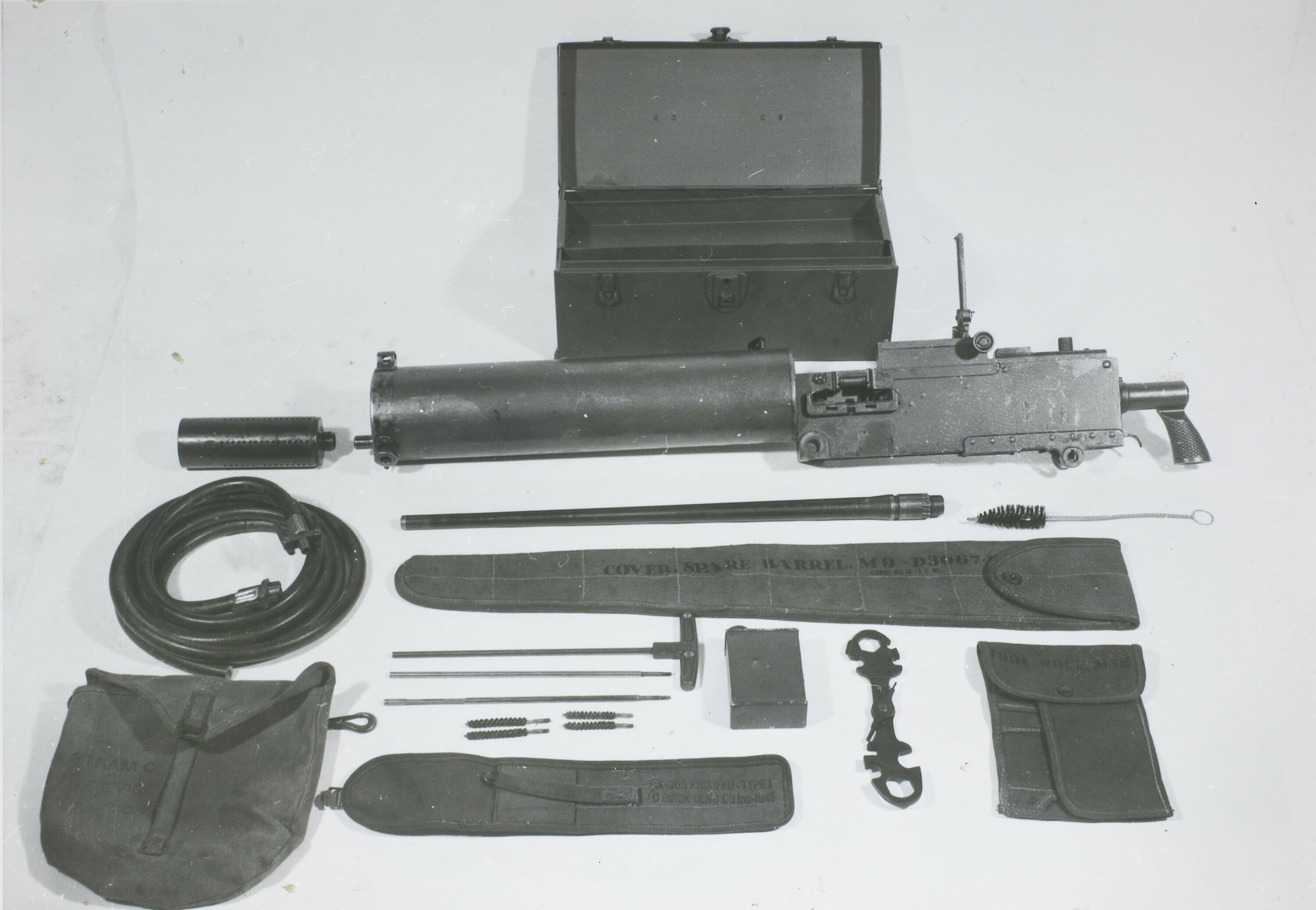
M1917A1 with spare barrel and other issued accessories

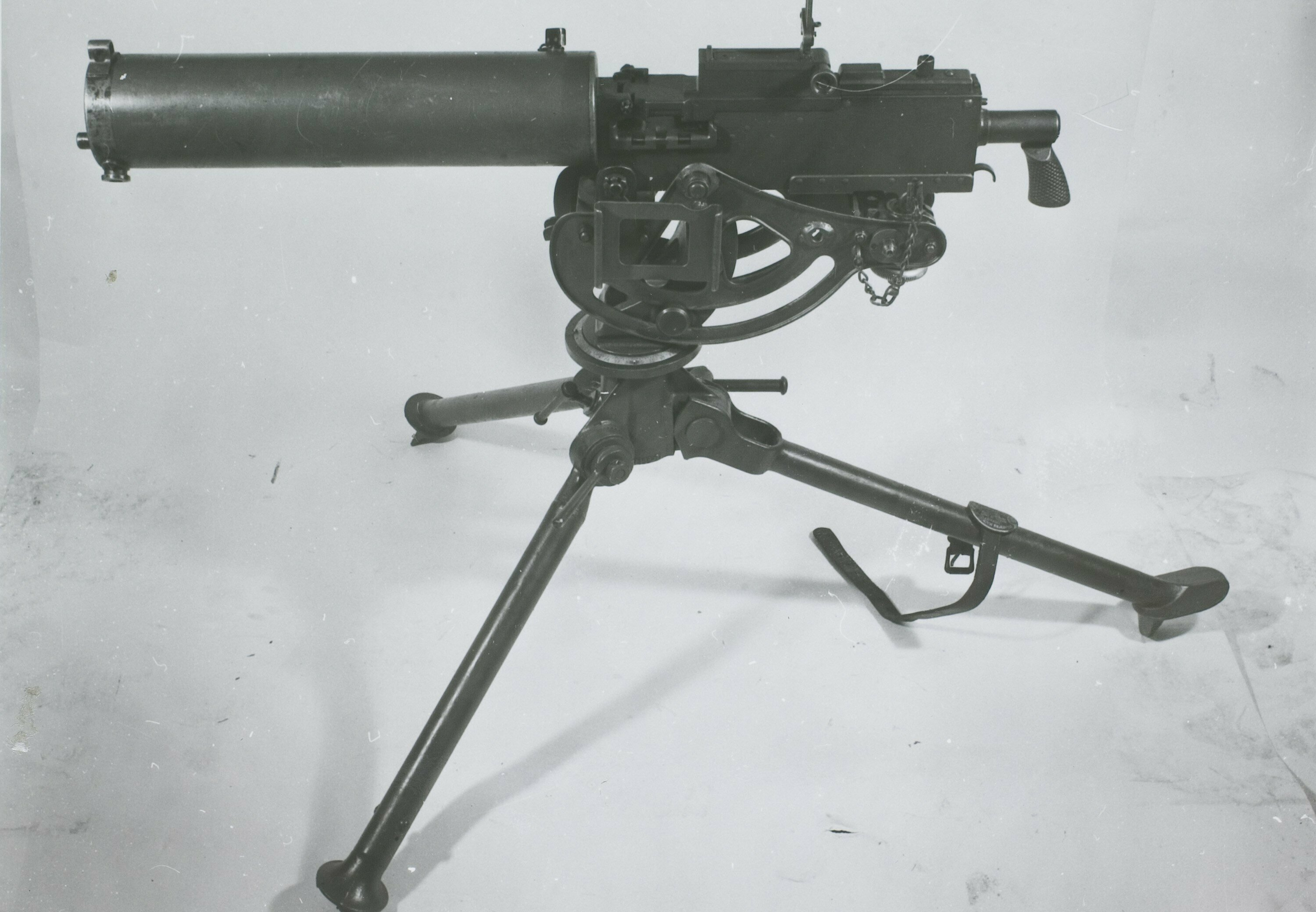
An M1917A1 on tripod mount

In the 1930s, the Ordnance Department developed a new bottom plate, which had side flanges that came up on both sides of the receiver and were attached by rivets. This fixed the problem of the original bottom plates, and became standard for all M1917- and M1919-series machine guns. While the US Arsenal at Rock Island was the leader in converting the existing stocks of M1917-series guns over to 1917A1 configuration, other arsenals took part. In addition, the rear sights were updated for the new ammunition and were changed to yards from meters, and also did away with the World War I multiple-aperture disk on the rear sight. The top covers also had a stronger feed pawl pivot arm installed, so the gun could handle the stress of pulling an ammunition belt from the ground. Rock Island Arsenal also developed an all-steel water jacket that went into production around 1943; this was stronger than the earlier brass-capped jackets. These steel components were interchangeable with the earlier brass ones to allow for repair of worn or damaged water jacket components.

Other changes were implemented, some during the war, but not all M1917s received these updates. Beginning in 1938, the pivot in the top cover was replaced with a new one that would become standard on all M1919-series guns. While the World War I–pattern top cover hinge pin appears to have been retained on most converted M1917s, the later-production M1917A1s had a positive locking top cover hinge pin that allowed the top cover to remain open, lessening the chance of it dropping closed on one's hands while working on the gun—this became the standard on all M1919-series guns.

==== M1918 ====
Air-cooled aircraft version of the M1917. Developed during the First World War, the M1918 arrived too late, but became the dominant weapon of its type in US service until the development of the M1919. It features a heavier barrel, but lighter barrel jacket as compared to the M1917. A sub-variant, the M1918M1, was developed as a flexible version of the fixed M1918.

=== International variants and designations ===
The M1917 pattern has been used in countries the world over in a variety of forms. In certain cases a new designation was applied by the user nation.

==== FN30 ====
From 1930, Belgian Fabrique Nationale produced air-cooled and water-cooled versions of the M1917, chambered in various calibers for domestic and export use.

==== Ksp m/14-29 and ksp m/36 ====
Kulspruta m/14-29 was the Swedish designation for the licensed M1917A1, produced by Carl Gustafs Gevärsfaktori in Eskilstuna, for infantry support. The main differences was that it was chambered in the standard caliber 6.5×55mm, had spade-grips and used the cooling jacket and tripod of the m/14 (Schwarzlose) tripod, the machine gun the Ksp m/14-29 replaced. The reason for adoption of the Browning was cost: 50 machine guns using the Browning mechanism could be made for the same price as 30 Schwarzlose, which was discovered during the manufacture of Kulspruta m/22.

The 6.5mm bullet was found to be too light for long-range fire support and anti-aircraft use, so in 1932 the heavier 8×63mm patron m/32 cartridge was developed. As this resulted in a heavier recoil, a spring-loaded cradle replaced the backplate with a heavily spring-loaded buffer that acted as an extension of the standard Browning recoil buffer. This also replaced the regular spade-grips with the ones integrated in the cradle. The cradle, now part of the weapon, would then be hooked onto a tripod m/36. This tripod featured, beside a 5×25 power optical sight, advanced elevation and traverse controls. The unprecedented recoil control and steadiness of the tripod made Dolf Goldsmith remark that this arrangement "was undoubtedly the most accurate long-range rifle-caliber machine gun ever made". For anti-aircraft purposes, a double cradle was made to hold a matching pair of m/36s. The right gun, lacking sights altogether, was fed from the right, while the left gun, with iron sights complemented with an AA sight ring, was fed from left. The cocking handles were located between the guns, while safeties and triggers were individual for left and right. The special AA tripod had elongated legs and chains to either secure the tripod or hang weights on it for extra stability. These double cradles were also used as standard defense, mounted on a ring on the cab roof, on terrain vehicles and armored troop carriers like Terrängbil m/42 KP. The latter was used with good effect in the Congo Crisis in the early-1960s. Until 1966, the m/14-29 and m/36 machine guns could use both the 6.5mm and the 8 mm ammunition. Converting between the two was a matter of changing barrels, cartridge stops, and bolts.

In 1966, most were converted to 7.62×51mm NATO. Some old models were retained in training use to use up the stores of obsolete ammunition. After the stocks were expended in the 1970s, all guns were re-barreled to 7.62mm NATO. The weapons were finally taken out of service in 1995.

==== Ckm wz.30 ====
The Ckm wz.30 was an unlicensed Polish-built modification of the Colt Model of 1924 chambered in 7.92×57mm Mauser. The modifications included new iron sights (V-notch rather than loophole), lengthened butt handle, lengthened barrel, simplified rifle lock for easier exchange of used-up barrels and better handling, mounting adapted for both anti-personnel and AA fire and sights and grips adapted to suit both purposes. Roughly 8,000 were built by Państwowa Fabryka Karabinów.

==== Colt mitraljøse m/29 ====
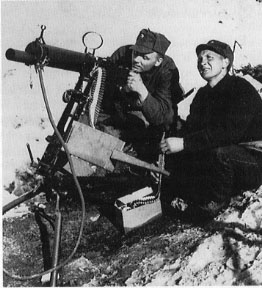
Norwegian M/29 in anti-aircraft configuration on the Narvik front, 1940

Norwegian designation for the Colt MG 38 (mentioned in the following section) in 7.92×61mm, used as the standard heavy machine gun and anti-aircraft weapon for the Norwegian Army from 1929 to 1940. The Colt mitraljøse m/29 replaced the Hotchkiss M1914 machine gun in Norwegian service. In all, 1,800 m/29s were in Norwegian service by the time of 9 April 1940 German invasion. The m/29 saw service in the 1940 Norwegian Campaign, often deployed as the only heavy weapon of Norwegian front line units.

=== Commercial variants ===
Colt commercially produced the M1917 under several names:

- Colt Model of 1919 (not to be confused with the air-cooled M1919 Browning machine gun)
- Colt Model of 1924.
- Colt Model of 1928. The Model 1928 featured a thumb safety, Type A flash hider, and a mount for a panoramic sight unit.
- Colt MG38 series, derivatives of the Colt M1928 for general commercial sale, designed in 1931.

The 38 and 38B were water-cooled with a barrel jacket threaded inside the trunnion, unlike the M1917 and Colt Model 1928.
The 38BT was a short heavy barreled air-cooled weapon resembling the Browning M1919A2, designed for use in tanks.
The MG40 was an aircraft machine gun, with double handgrips.
The 38 series also features spade grips, not found on the rest of the M1917 and the majority of the M1919 families.

=== Derivatives ===
A simplified, air-cooled version of the weapon, the Model 1919, was adopted after World War I and saw action in World War II, the Korean War, the Vietnam War, and the Congo crisis.

== Users ==
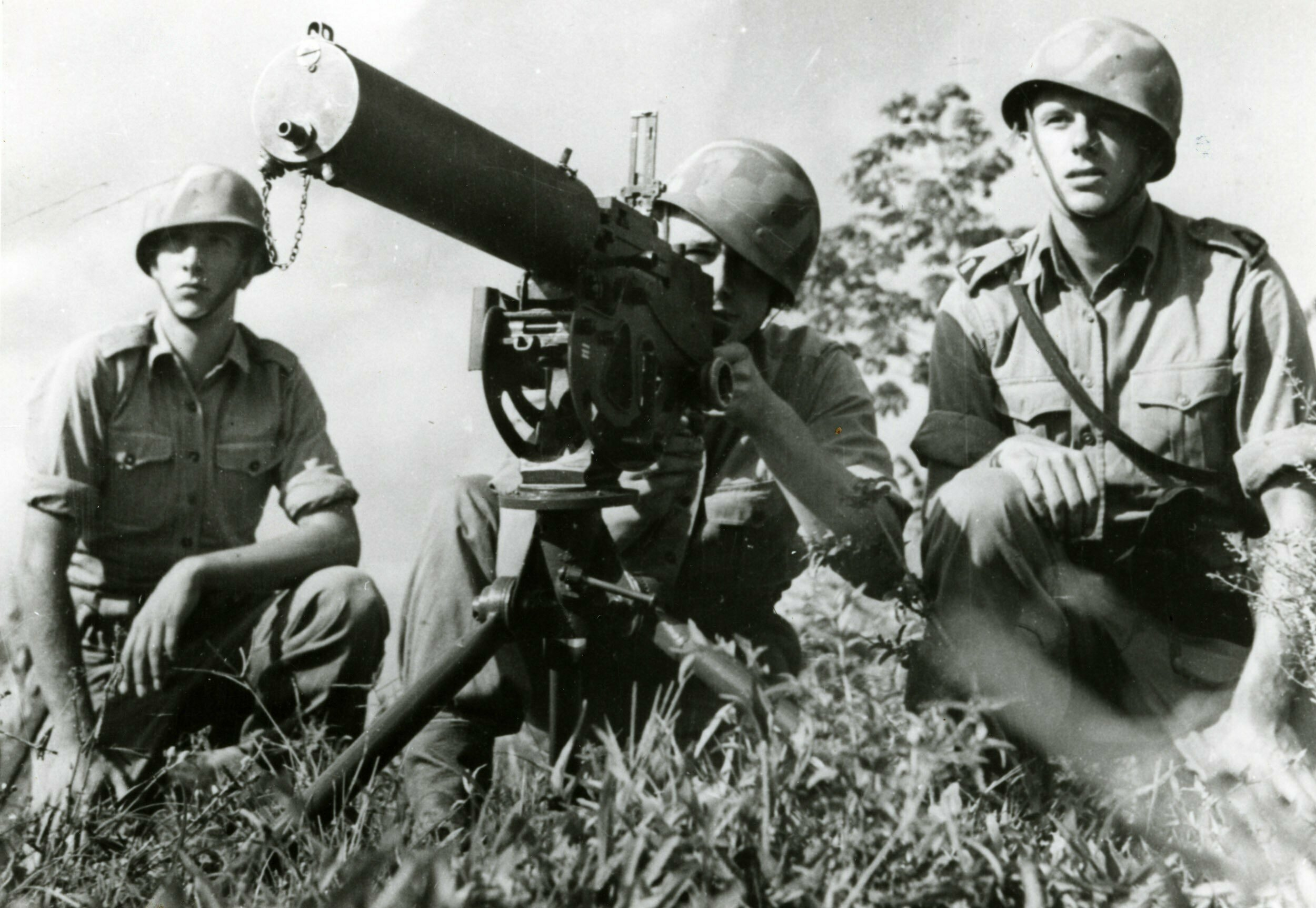
Dutch soldiers of the Royal Netherlands East Indies Army train on the M1917A1.

- Argentina: Colt Model 1928 and FN Model 30 in 7.65×53mm Mauser
- Belgium: locally produced
- Bolivia: bought 256 MG38s between 1920 and 1938 and 207 MG40s in 1933–1934, all in 7.65×53mm Mauser.
- China: "Type Triple-Ten" a.k.a. "Type 30", a Chinese copy of the M1917 in 7.92×57mm Mauser used in the Second Sino-Japanese War
- Cuba
- Ethiopia
- France: used airborne variant in 7.5×54mm as the Modèle 1938. The M1917 HMG was also used by the BF-ONU and during the First Indochina War.
- Greece: FN30 variant in 6.5×54mm Mannlicher–Schönauer
- Guatemala: Model 1924 in 7×57mm Mauser
- South Korea: The Armed Forces received 316 M1917A1s before the Korean War, and 751 were in service with the Army by the end of the war.
- Mexico: Model 1919 in 7×57mm Mauser
- Netherlands: Used by KNIL troops (as seen in the image above).
- Norway: m/29
- Paraguay: bought 144 MG38s between 1928 and 1934
- Philippines
- Poland
- Sweden (designated as Kulspruta (Ksp) m/36)
- Thailand: FN Model 30 in 8x52mmR, designated as the Type 66
- United Kingdom: Acquired through Lend-Lease
- United States: was the standard medium machine gun until it was replaced a few years after WWII. It was used in the Army Reserve and Army National Guard until the late 1960s and early 1970s.
- Viet Cong: Captured and used early in the war by Main Force & Local

== See also ==
- List of U.S. Army weapons by supply catalog designation (SNL A-5)

=== Weapons of comparable role, performance and era ===
- Vickers machine gun – British equivalent
- MG 08 – German equivalent
- MG 11 – Swiss equivalent
- PM M1910 – Russian equivalent
- Schwarzlose machine gun – Austro-Hungarian equivalent
