= HSwMS Karlskrona (J8) =

Swedish destroyer

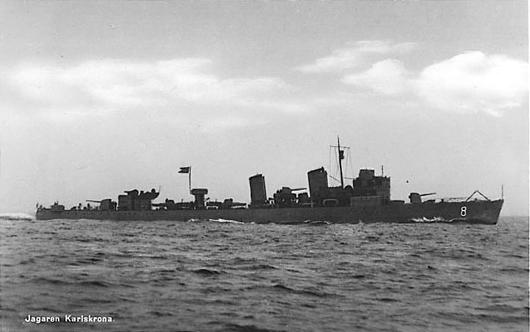
- Karlskrona

History

Sweden
- Name: Karlskrona
- Namesake: Karlskrona
- Builder: Karlskronavarvet, Karlskrona
- Launched: 16 June 1939
- Commissioned: 12 September 1940
- Decommissioned: 1 July 1974
- Fate: Broken up in 1979

General characteristics
- Class & type: Göteborg-class destroyer
- Displacement: 1,200 t (1,181 long tons), full load; 1,040 t (1,020 long tons), standard displacement
- Length: 310 ft 4 in (94.59 m) o.a.
- Beam: 29 ft 6 in (8.99 m)
- Draught: 12 ft 6 in (3.81 m)
- Propulsion: 3 oil fired boilers, 2 de Laval steam turbines, 32,000 shp (24,000 kW), 2 screws
- Speed: 39 knots (72 km/h; 45 mph)
- Range: 1,200 nmi (2,200 km; 1,400 mi) at 20 kn (37 km/h; 23 mph)
- Complement: 135
- Armament: 3 × 120 mm (4.7 in) Bofors M/24C DP guns (3×1); 6 × 25 mm (0.98 in) Bofors M/40 (3×2); 6 × 533 mm (21 in) torpedo tubes (2×3); 2 × Depth charge throwers

HSwMS Karlskrona was a destroyer of the Royal Swedish Navy that served during the Second World War and in the Cold War. The fourth member of the Göteborg or city class, which was designed as an improvement on the previous Ehrensköld class, Karlskrona was launched on 16 June 1939. The destroyer served in the Coastal Fleet during the war, protecting Swedish neutrality and escorting convoys. After the war, the ship was upgraded between 1950 and 1951 with enhanced fire control and an armament improved with the introduction of the Bofors 40 mm anti-aircraft gun. Ten years later, in 1961, Karlskrona was designated a fast anti-submarine frigate and the torpedo tubes were replaced by Squid mortars. The vessel was decommissioned on 1 July 1974 and broken up in 1979.

== Design and development ==
The Göteborg or city class were a development of the Ehrensköld-class destroyer with a higher speed achieved by introducing superheating and lightening the structure through using welding rather than rivets. After the success of the first two members of the class, Göteborg and Stockholm, both laid down in 1933, the Swedish Riksdag authorised an additional two ships of the same design, including Karlskrona, in 1936.

Displacing 1,040 t (1,020 long tons) standard and 1,200 tonnes (1,200 long tons) full load, Karlskrona had an overall length of 94.6 m (310 ft 4 in) and 93 m (305 ft 1 in) between perpendiculars. Beam was 9 m (29 ft 6 in) and maximum draught 3.8 m (12 ft 6 in). Power was provided by three Penhoët oil-fired boilers feeding two de Laval geared steam turbines driving two shafts. The ship had two funnels. New materials allowed the boilers to be superheated to 125 °C (257 °F), which raised the rated power to e 32,000 shaft horsepower (24,000 kW) to give a design speed of 39 knots (72 km/h; 45 mph). In trials, the destroyer exceeded 40 knots (74 km/h; 46 mph). A total of 150 tonnes (150 long tons) of fuel oil was carried to give a range of 1,200 nautical miles (2,200 km; 1,400 mi) at 20 knots (37 km/h; 23 mph).

The main armament consisted of three 12 cm (4.7 in) K/45 M24C dual-purpose guns produced by Bofors. These were placed in separate mounts on the ship's centreline, with one on the forecastle, one aft and one between the funnels. The guns were of a loose-barrel type, weighed 3 t (3.0 long tons) and fired a 24 kg (53 lb) projectile at 800 m/s (2,600 ft/s). Air defence consisted six 25 mm (0.98 in) M/40 autocannons in three twin mounts, also provided by Bofors. Two triple rotating torpedo tube mounts for 53 cm (21 in) torpedoes were aft of the superstructure and two depth charge throwers were carried further towards the stern. Approximately forty mines could also be carried for minelaying. The ship had a complement of 135 officers and ratings.

== Construction and career ==
Karlskrona was laid down by Karlskronavarvet in Karlskrona, launched on 16 June 1939 and commissioned on 12 September the following year. The ship was named for the city and allocated the pennant number J8. On 29 June, the destroyer joined the Coastal Fleet, serving on patrols to protect Swedish neutrality and as an escort for convoys travelling through Swedish waters.

Between 1950 and 1951, the destroyer was given a substantial modernisation. The hull was rebuilt with a beam extended by 70 cm (28 in) and displacement increased to 1,140 t (1,120 long tons). The bridge was enlarged and better fire control was fitted, along with a tripod with radar to replace the pole mast. The armament was updated. The central gun was moved aft to a superfiring position, which greatly enhanced the operational capability as the funnels had restricted fire. The anti-aircraft guns were replaced with four single Bofors 40 mm (1.6 in) guns.

Karlskrona was rerated a fast frigate on 1 January 1961 along with the rest of the class. In 1963, the torpedo tubes were replaced by two Squid anti-submarine mortars and the destroyer reentered service in the anti-submarine role with the pennant number F79. During the 1960s, the Swedish Navy decided to retire the larger destroyers and frigates in the fleet as newer missile-equipped fast attack craft became the mainstay of the surface fleet. Karlskrona was consequently decommissioned on 1 July 1974. The frigate was used as a target ship before being broken up in 1979.
