= Klas-class destroyer =

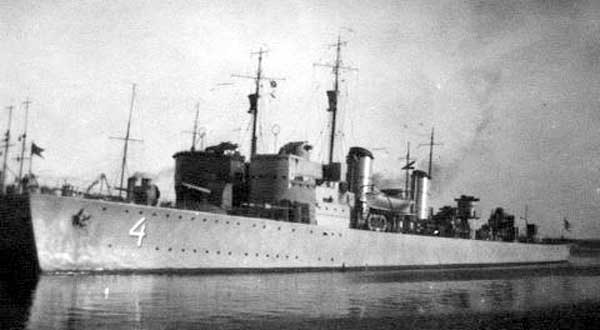
- Klas Uggla

Class overview
- Name: Klas class
- Builders: Kockums; Karlskrona Navy Yard
- Operators: Swedish Navy
- Preceded by: Ehrensköld class
- Succeeded by: Göteborg class
- Built: 1930–1932
- In commission: 1932–1958
- Planned: 2
- Completed: 2
- Lost: 1
- Scrapped: 1

General characteristics
- Type: Destroyer
- Displacement: 1,020 long tons (1,036 t)
- Length: 91 m (298 ft 7 in) (pp)
- Beam: 8.9 m (29 ft 2 in)
- Draught: 3.7 m (12 ft 2 in) (deep load)
- Installed power: 3 Penhoët boilers; 26,000 shp (19,388 kW)
- Propulsion: 2 shafts; 2 geared steam turbines
- Speed: 36 knots (67 km/h; 41 mph)
- Range: 1,600 nmi (3,000 km; 1,800 mi) at 20 knots (37 km/h; 23 mph)
- Complement: 130
- Armament: 3 × single 120 mm (4.7 in) guns; 2 × single 40 mm (1.6 in) AA guns; 2 × triple 533 mm (21 in) torpedo tubes; 2 × depth charge throwers; 20 naval mines

The Klas class, also referred to as the Klas Horn class, was a pair of destroyers in service with the Swedish Navy from 1932 to 1958. They are sometimes considered part of the preceding Ehrensköld-class destroyers. Two ships in the class was constructed between 1930 and 1932, HSwMS Klas Uggla and HSwMS Klas Horn. The ships were involved in the Hårsfjärden disaster in 1941, in which both ships were damaged. Klas Uggla was raised but decommissioned, Klas Horn was repaired and continued to serve in the navy until 1958.

== Description ==
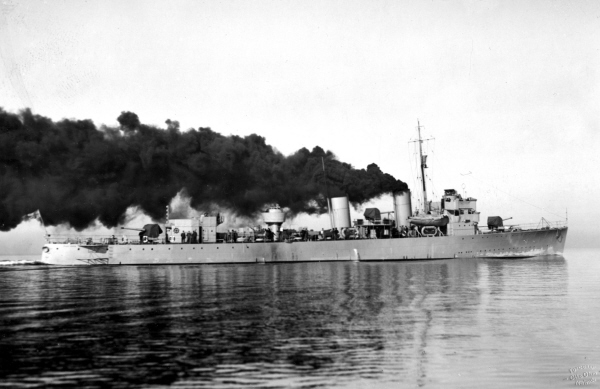
HSwMS Klas Horn

The Klas class were an improved version of the preceding Ehrensköld-class destroyers and were sometimes considered part of the class. They had a standard displacement of 1,020 long tons (1,040 t) and were 91 metres (298 ft 6.7 in) long between perpendiculars with a beam of 8.9 m (29 ft 2.4 in) and a maximum draught of 3.7 metres (12 ft 1.7 in). The destroyers were powered by three Penhoët boilers that delivered steam to two de Laval geared turbines, each driving one propeller shaft, rated at 26,000 shaft horsepower (19,000 kW). This gave the destroyers a maximum speed of 36 knots (67 km/h; 41 mph). The Klas class carried 150 long tons (150 t) of fuel oil and had a range of 1,600 nautical miles (3,000 km; 1,800 mi) at 20 knots (37 km/h; 23 mph).

The Klas-class destroyers' main armament was three single 120-millimetre (4.7 in) guns and two triple 533-millimetre (21 in) torpedo tubes. For anti-aircraft defence, the destroyers were equipped with two (40 mm (1.6 in)) AA guns. These were later replaced with four 25 mm (0.98 in) Bofors cannon. The destroyers were armed with two depth charge throwers for anti-submarine warfare and could carry 20 naval mines. The ships had a complement of 130.

== Ships in class ==
Klas class
Name	Builder	Laid down	Launched	Completed	Fate
Klas Horn	Kockums	1929	13 June 1931	1932	Stricken 15 August 1958
Klas Uggla	Karlskrona Navy Yard	1929	18 June 1931	1932	Sunk 17 September 1941

== Operational history ==
Both ships were laid down in 1929, with Klas Horn being constructed by Kockums and Klas Uggla built by the Karlskrona Navy Yard. Klas Horn was launched on 13 June 1931 and Klas Uggla on 18 June 1931. They were both completed in 1932. The Klas-class destroyers were sometimes used to escort Swedish ore carriers and German troop transports. On 17 September 1941, an unsolved explosion at Hårsfjärden Naval Base known as the Hårsfjärden disaster took place. Both Klas-class destroyers were sunk in the explosion along with the destroyer HSwMS Göteborg. In the explosion, thirty-three were killed and seventeen wounded from the three ships. Klas Horn was raised and returned to service, using parts from the non-repairable Klas Uggla. The vessel's anti-aircraft weaponry was increased to six 25 mm cannon. Klas Horn remained in active service until 1958. From 1958 until 1967, the ship was used as a training hulk. On 14 November 1967, Klas Horn was sold for scrap.

== Sources ==
- Borgenstam, Curt; Insulander, Per & Kaudern, Gösta (1989). Jagare: med Svenska flottans jagare under 80 år [Destroyers: Swedish Navy Destroyers under 80 Years] (in Swedish). Västra Frölunda: Marinlitteratur. ISBN 91-970700-4-1. SELIBR 7792227.
- Gilmour, John (2011) [2010]. Sweden, the Swastika and Stalin: The Swedish Experience in the Second World War. Edinburgh, Scotland: Edinburgh University Press. ISBN 978-0-7486-2747-9.
- von Hofsten, Gustaf; Waernberg, Jan & Ohlsson, Curt S. (2003). Örlogsfartyg: svenska maskindrivna fartyg under tretungad flagg [Ships of War: Swedish Machine-powered Ships under the Triple-tailed Flag]. Forum navales skriftserie, 1650-1837 (in Swedish). Vol. 6. Svenskt militärhistoriskt bibl. i samarbete med Marinlitteratur. ISBN 91-974384-3-X. SELIBR 8873330.
- Parkes, Oscar, ed. (1933). Jane's Fighting Ships 1933. Sampson Low. OCLC 669163032.
- Westerlund, Karl-Erik (1980). "Sweden". In Chesneau, Roger (ed.). Conway's All the World's Fighting Ships, 1922–1946. Greenwich, UK: Conway Maritime Press. pp. 368–377. ISBN 0-85177-146-7.
- Whitley, M. J. (2000). Destroyers of World War Two: An International Encyclopedia. London: Cassell & Co. ISBN 1-85409-521-8.
