= HSwMS Ehrensköld =

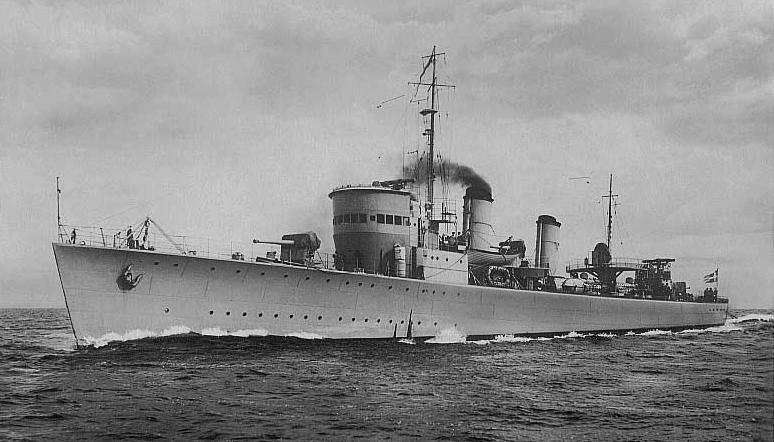
- HSwMS Ehrensköld

History

Sweden
- Name: Ehrensköld
- Namesake: Admiral Nils Ehrenschiöld
- Builder: Kockums, Malmö
- Laid down: 1924
- Launched: 25 September 1926
- Commissioned: 14 September 1927
- Decommissioned: 1 April 1963
- Identification: 11, 1, 71
- Fate: Scrapped 1973

General characteristics
- Type: Destroyer
- Displacement: 974 long tons (990 t) standard
- Length: 89 m (292 ft 0 in) pp.; 91.4 m (300 ft) o/a
- Beam: 8.88 m (29 ft 2 in)
- Draught: 3.8 m (12 ft 6 in)
- Propulsion: 2 shaft, 2× de Laval geared steam turbines, 3 Penhoët boilers; 34,000 shp (25,000 kW)
- Speed: 36 kn (41 mph; 67 km/h)
- Range: 1,600 nmi (1,800 mi; 3,000 km) at 16 kn (18 mph; 30 km/h)
- Complement: 120
- Armament: 3× Bofors M24 120 mm (4.7 in) guns; 2× Vickers 40 mm anti-aircraft guns; 6× 53 cm (21 in) torpedo tubes (2 × 3)

HSwMS Ehrensköld (11), was the lead ship of her class of destroyer in the Swedish Navy during World War II. Together with the sister ship HSwMS Nordenskjöld (12), she constituted the Ehrensköld class, which, with its size and speed, was a major step in the Swedish destroyer fleet. Initially, Ehrensköld had pennant number 11, which was later changed to 1. In 1951–1952, the ship was converted to frigate, and then received the pennant number 71. She was decommissioned in 1963 and was sold for scrapping in 1973.

== Design ==
Ehrensköld was 91.4 meters long and had a maximum displacement of 1,000 tons. The hull was made of nitrated steel with a precipitating stem and so called "cruiser stern", which meant it was rounded. On the front of the deck was a three-story superstructure that included the bridge, wheelhouse, the medical department and the galley.

The machinery consisted of three oil-fired boilers that delivered steam to two steam turbines, which each propelled its propeller. The machine generated 24,000 horsepower, giving a speed of 35 knots.

Ehrensköld's main armament was made up of three 12 cm guns, placed on the front deck, between the funnels and on the aft deck. In the stern there was an anti-aircraft bridge with two 40 mm anti-aircraft automatic guns. Furthermore, there were torpedo tubes, depth charge thrower and rack-deployed depth charges. Mines could also be deployed.

== History ==
Ehrensköld was built by Kockums in Malmö and was launched on 25 September 1926. The ship was named after the admiral Nils Ehrenschiöld. Initially the ship had the whole name but the first name was removed the year after the christening.

In the summer of 1929, Ehrensköld escorted together with the sister ship Nordenskjöld the coastal defence ship HSwMS Sverige during a trip to Estonia and Latvia. On board the coastal defence ship was King Gustaf V, and the trip was first to Tallinn and then Riga before the ships returned to Sweden. The following year, the sister ships participated in another international trip. This time, together with the HSwMS Gustav V and HSwMS Drottning Victoria to the then German city of Swinemünde. The purpose of the trip was to collect the dust from Queen Victoria, who had recently died in Rome.

In 1934 Ehrensköld ran aground during a move from Karlskrona to Stockholm, where a large hole was torn up in the bottom of the forebody. By flooding parts of the afterbody and making a powerful reverse maneuver, the ship made it off the shoal and made its way to Stockholm's naval shipyards for repairs.

=== World War II ===
In September 1938, when Germany claimed Czechoslovak territories, Ehrensköld, together with HSwMS Klas Horn, were the only mobilized destroyers in the Swedish Navy. In April 1940, when Germany invaded Denmark and Norway, she was demobilized in Karlskrona and the staff shortage in the navy made it difficult to man the ship. Only after many exercises with new crew could the ship be put into service on 2 September.

At the beginning of the World War II, Ehrensköld was part of the Karlskrona Squadron, which was part of the South Coast Naval District. In 1942 she was part of the Coastal Fleet, which was the largest and most powerful unit of the Swedish Navy, and then moved back to Karlskrona Squadron.

=== After the war ===
From 1951 to 1952 Ehrensköld was converted to frigate, with the torpedo armament and the aft gun removed and replaced by four 40 mm automatic guns m/36. Furthermore, she was equipped with equipment such as hydrophone and depth charges for anti-submarine warfare. Command center was set up and radar was installed.

=== Fate ===
Ehrensköld was decommissioned on 1 April 1963, after which she was as a target ship. In 1973 the ship was sold and scrapped in Ystad.
