= HSwMS Malmö =

Several ships of the Swedish Navy have been named HSwMS Malmö, named after the city of Malmö:

- HSwMS Malmö (J7) was a Göteborg-class destroyer launched in 1938 and decommissioned in 1965
- HSwMS Malmö (P12) was a Stockholm-class corvette launched in 1985
