= HSwMS Malmö (J7) =

Swedish destroyer

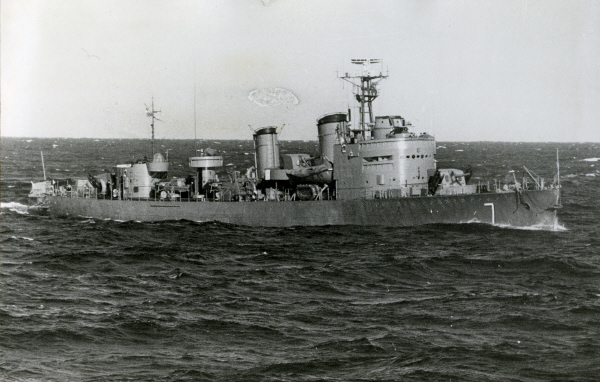
- Malmö

History

Sweden
- Name: Malmö
- Namesake: Malmö
- Builder: Eriksbergs Mekaniska Verkstad, Gothenburg
- Launched: 22 September 1938
- Commissioned: 15 August 1939
- Decommissioned: 1 February 1965

General characteristics
- Class & type: Göteborg-class destroyer
- Displacement: 1,200 t (1,181 long tons), full load; 1,040 t (1,020 long tons), standard displacement
- Length: 310 ft 4 in (94.59 m) o.a.
- Beam: 29 ft 6 in (8.99 m)
- Draught: 12 ft 6 in (3.81 m)
- Propulsion: 3 oil fired boilers, 2 de Laval steam turbines, 32,000 shp (24,000 kW), 2 screws
- Speed: 39 knots (72 km/h; 45 mph)
- Range: 1,200 nmi (2,200 km; 1,400 mi) at 20 kn (37 km/h; 23 mph)
- Complement: 135
- Armament: 3 × 120 mm (4.7 in) Bofors M/24C DP guns (3×1); 6 × 25 mm (0.98 in) Bofors M/40 (3×2); 6 × 533 mm (21 in) torpedo tubes (2×3); 2 × Depth charge throwers

HSwMS Malmö was a destroyer of the Royal Swedish Navy that served during the Second World War and in the Cold War. The third member of the Göteborg or City class, an improvement on the previous Ehrensköld class, Malmö was launched on 22 September 1938. The destroyer served during the war on neutrality patrols and escorts, as well as the evacuation of Gotland in 1941. After the war, the ship was upgraded multiple times. Armament was improved with the introduction of the Bofors 40 mm anti-aircraft gun in 1951 and the Squid mortar ten years later. The latter followed the redefinition of Malmö as an anti-submarine frigate. The ship served in that role for a short time, being decommissioned on 1 February 1965 and broken up as the part of a wider Swedish naval programme of retiring destroyers and frigates.

== Design and development ==
The Göteborg or City class were a development of the Ehrensköld-class destroyer with a higher speed achieved by introducing superheating and lightening the structure through using welding rather than rivets. After the success of the first two members of the class, Göteborg and Stockholm, both laid down in 1933, the Swedish Riksdag authorised an additional two ships of the same design in 1936. The first of this second batch was Malmö.

Displacing 1,040 tonnes (1,020 long tons) standard and 1,200 t (1,200 long tons) full load, Norrköping had an overall length of 94.6 m (310 ft 4 in) and 93 m (305 ft 1 in) between perpendiculars. Beam was 9 m (29 ft 6 in) and maximum draught 3.8 m (12 ft 6 in). Power was provided by three Penhoët oil-fired boilers feeding two de Laval geared steam turbines driving two shafts. The ship had two funnels. New materials allowed the boilers to be superheated to 125 °C (257 °F), which raised the rated power to e 32,000 shaft horsepower (24,000 kW) to give a design speed of 39 knots (72 km/h; 45 mph). In trials, the destroyer exceeded this, reaching 41 knots (76 km/h; 47 mph). A total of 150 t (150 long tons) of fuel oil was carried to give a range of 1,200 nautical miles (2,200 km; 1,400 mi) at 20 knots (37 km/h; 23 mph).

The main armament consisted of three 12 cm (4.7 in) K/45 M24C dual-purpose guns produced by Bofors. These were placed in separate mounts on the ship's centreline, with one on the forecastle, one aft and one between the funnels. The guns were of a loose-barrel type, weighed 3 t (3.0 long tons) and fired a 24 kg (53 lb) projectile at 800 m/s (2,600 ft/s). Air defence consisted six 25 mm (0.98 in) M/40 autocannons in three twin mounts, also provided by Bofors. Two triple rotating torpedo tube mounts for 53 cm (21 in) torpedoes were aft of the superstructure and two depth charge throwers were carried further towards the stern. Approximately forty mines could also be carried for minelaying. The ship had a complement of 135 officers and ratings.

== Construction and career ==
Malmö was laid down by Eriksbergs Mekaniska Verkstad in Gothenburg, launched on 22 September 1938 and commissioned on 15 August the following year. Named after the city, the ship was allocated the pennant number J7 and joined the Coastal Fleet. During the Second World War, Malmö was involved in patrolling Swedish waters to protect Swedish neutrality. The vessel also provided escort to merchant ships travelling in Swedish waters and, during October 1941, was involved in the evacuation of Gotland to Nynäshamn.

At the end of the war, Malmö remained in service for another five years until, between 1950 and 1951, being given a substantial modernisation. The hull was rebuilt with a beam extended to 81 m (265 ft 9 in) and displacement increased to 1,200 t (1,200 long tons). The bridge was enlarged and better fire control was fitted, along with a tripod with radar to replace the pole mast. The armament was updated. The central gun was moved aft to a superfiring position. This greatly enhanced the operational capability as the funnels had restricted fire. The anti-aircraft guns were replaced with four single Bofors 40 mm (1.6 in) L/70 guns.

Malmö was rerated a frigate on 1 January 1961 along with the rest of the class. The ship was taken out of service and once again upgraded. The central gun and the torpedo tubes were replaced by two Squid anti-submarine mortars and four more single Bofors 40 mm (1.6 in) L/70 guns were mounted around the aft funnel. The frigate reentered service in 1962 and was used in an anti-submarine role with the pennant number F78. During the 1960s, the Swedish Navy decided to retire the larger frigates in the fleet as newer missile-equipped fast attack craft became the mainstay of the surface fleet. Malmö was decommissioned on 1 February 1965 and subsequently broken up.
