= HSwMS Gävle =

HSwMS Gävle includes the following ships of the Swedish Navy:

- HSwMS Gävle (J9), a Göteborg-class destroyer, launched 1940, broken up 1972
- HSwMS Gävle (K22), a Göteborg-class corvette, launched 1990

== See also ==
- Gävle
- HSwMS Gefle
