= HSwMS Norrköping (J10) =

Swedish destroyer

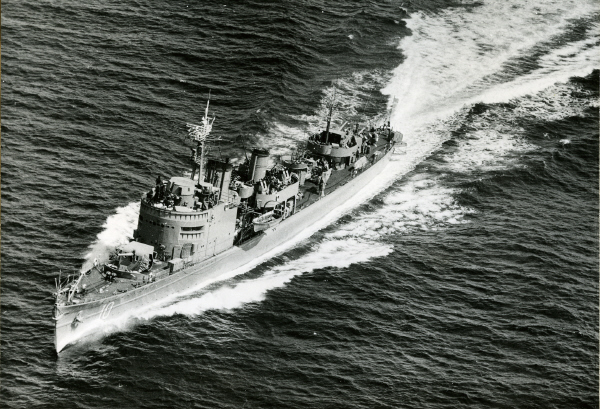
- Norrköping in 1955

History

Sweden
- Name: Norrköping
- Namesake: Norrköping
- Builder: Eriksbergs Mekaniska Verkstad, Gothenburg
- Laid down: 17 January 1940
- Launched: 5 September 1940
- Commissioned: 9 April 1941
- Decommissioned: 1 February 1965
- Fate: Sunk as a target ship 26 May 1977

General characteristics
- Class & type: Göteborg-class destroyer
- Displacement: 1,200 t (1,181 long tons), full load; 1,040 t (1,020 long tons), standard displacement
- Length: 310 ft 4 in (94.59 m) o.a.
- Beam: 29 ft 6 in (8.99 m)
- Draught: 12 ft 6 in (3.81 m)
- Propulsion: 3 oil fired boilers, 2 de Laval steam turbines, 32,000 shp (24,000 kW), 2 screws
- Speed: 39 knots (72 km/h; 45 mph)
- Range: 1,200 nmi (2,200 km; 1,400 mi) at 20 kn (37 km/h; 23 mph)
- Complement: 135
- Armament: 3 × 120 mm (4.7 in) Bofors M/24C DP guns (3×1); 6 × 25 mm (0.98 in) Bofors M/40 (3×2); 6 × 533 mm (21 in) torpedo tubes (2×3); 2 × Depth charge throwers

HSwMS Norrköping was a destroyer of the Royal Swedish Navy that served during the Second World War and in the Cold War. The sixth member of the Göteborg or city class, an improvement on the previous Ehrensköld class, Norrköping was launched on 5 September 1940. After the Second World War, in 1948, the destroyer took part in a European tour with other Swedish warships, led by the cruiser Fylgia, which involved sailing to the Netherlands, Norway and the United Kingdom. Between 1950 and 1951, the ship was upgraded, with new more effective anti-aircraft weapons, new electronics and a slight increase in beam and displacement, In 1952, the destroyer went on another tour, accompanied by the cruiser Gotland, to Belgium. Rerated a frigate in 1961, the vessel was decommissioned on 1 February 1965. Subsequently used as a target ship, Norrköping was finally sunk on 26 May 1977.

== Design and development ==
The Göteborg or city class were a development of the Ehrensköld-class destroyer with a higher speed achieved by introducing superheating and lightening the structure through using welding rather than rivets. After the success of the first two members of the class, Göteborg and Stockholm, both laid down in 1933, and two successive members of the class, the Swedish Riksdag authorised an additional two ships of the same design at the start of the Second World War. Norrköping was the last of this final batch to be ordered.

Displacing 1,040 t (1,020 long tons) standard and 1,200 tonnes (1,200 long tons) full load, Norrköping had an overall length of 94.6 m (310 ft 4 in) and 93 m (305 ft 1 in) between perpendiculars. Beam was 9 m (29 ft 6 in) and maximum draught 3.8 m (12 ft 6 in). Power was provided by three Penhoët oil-fired boilers feeding two de Laval geared steam turbines driving two shafts. The ship had two funnels. New materials allowed the boilers to be superheated to 125 °C (257 °F), which raised the rated power to e 32,000 shaft horsepower (24,000 kW) to give a design speed of 39 knots (72 km/h; 45 mph). In trials, the destroyer exceeded this. A total of 150 tonnes (150 long tons) of fuel oil was carried to give a range of 1,200 nautical miles (2,200 km; 1,400 mi) at 20 knots (37 km/h; 23 mph).

The main armament consisted of three 12 cm (4.7 in) K/45 M24C dual-purpose guns produced by Bofors. These were placed in separate mounts on the ship's centreline, with one on the forecastle, one aft and one between the funnels. The guns were of a loose-barrel type, weighed 3 t (3.0 long tons) and fired a 24 kg (53 lb) projectile at 800 m/s (2,600 ft/s). Air defence consisted six 25 mm (0.98 in) M/40 autocannons in three twin mounts, also provided by Bofors. Two triple rotating torpedo tube mounts for 53 cm (21 in) torpedoes were aft of the superstructure and two depth charge throwers were carried further towards the stern. Approximately forty mines could also be carried for minelaying. The ship had a complement of 135 officers and ratings.

== Construction and career ==
Norrköping was laid down by Eriksbergs Mekaniska Verkstad in Gothenburg on 17 January 1940, launched on 5 September the same year and commissioned on 9 April the following year. The ship was named for the city and allocated the pennant number J10. The ship served with the fleet on patrols to protect Swedish neutrality. On 25 November 1943, Norrköping was involved in the rescue of the crew of the German steamer Casablanca near Bogskär in the Sea of Åland. During 1944, the destroyer was involved in the evacuation of Estonia before the advancing Soviet Army. Norrköping rescued 173 refugees during September and October.

On 10 May 1948, the destroyer sailed from Gothenburg on the first day of a tour of European cities with sister ship Stockholm and the cruiser Fylgia. The tour included five days in Bristol, seven days in Amsterdam and four in Trondheim, returning on 14 June. On 30 May 1952, the same two destroyers escorted the cruiser Gotland on another visit, this time to Antwerp, returning on 2 July.

Between 1950 and 1951, the destroyer was given a substantial modernisation. The hull was rebuilt with a beam extended by 70 cm (28 in) and displacement increased to 1,140 t (1,120 long tons). The bridge was enlarged and better fire control was fitted, along with a tripod with radar to replace the pole mast. The armament was updated. The central gun was moved aft to a superfiring position, which greatly enhanced the operational capability as the funnels had restricted fire. The anti-aircraft guns were replaced with four single Bofors 40 mm (1.6 in) guns.

Norrköping was rerated a frigate on 1 January 1961 along with the rest of the class but was not further updated. The destroyer did not serve long in this capacity and was decommissioned on 1 February 1965. Norrköping was subsequently used as a target ship until being sunk on 26 May 1977. The wreck lies near that of sister ship Göteborg.
