= Hårsfjärden =

Fjard off the Baltic Sea near Stockholm, Sweden

Coordinates: 59.066667°N 18.149722°E

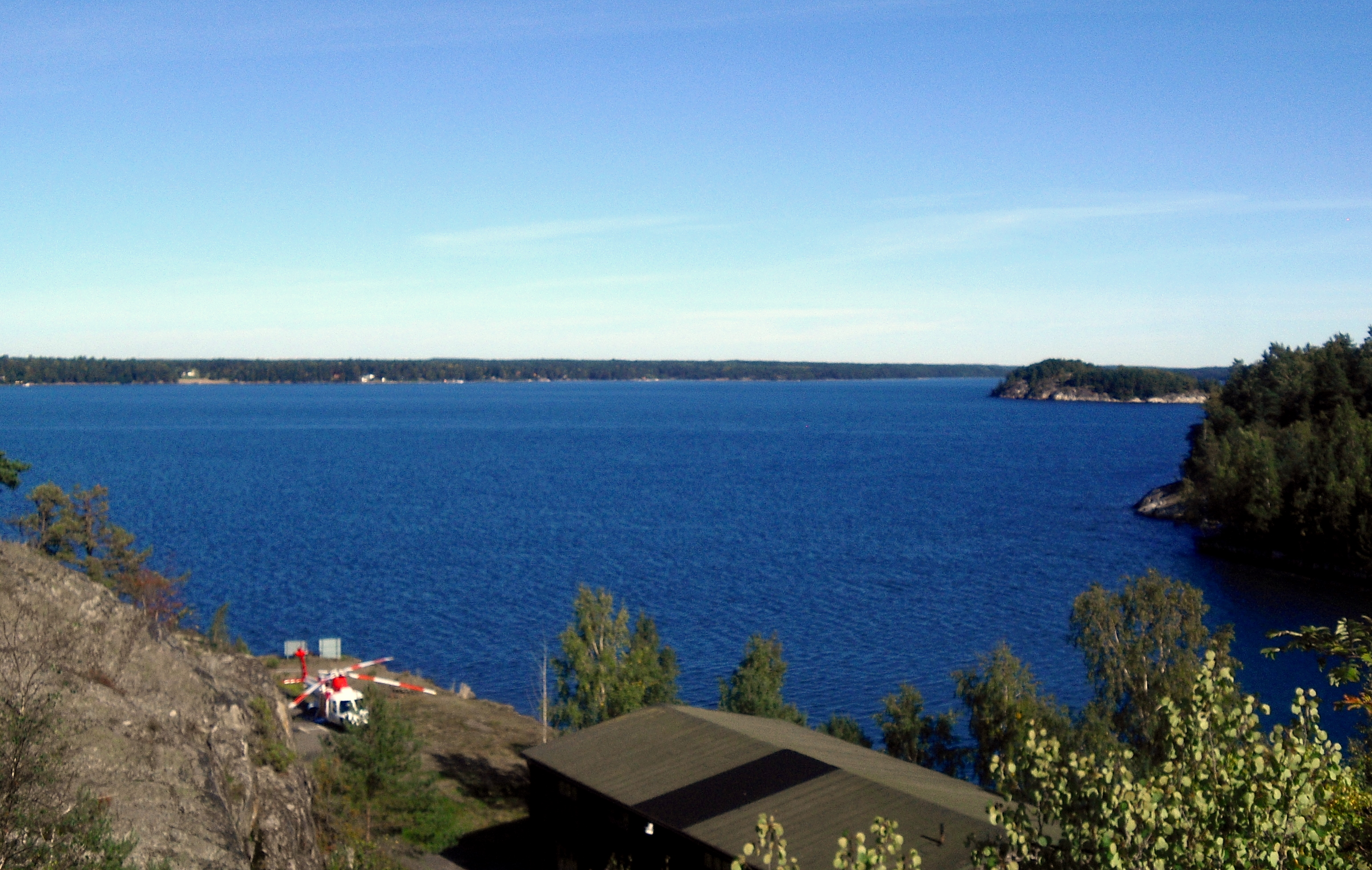
The Hårsfjärden, looking north from Märsgarn island in September 2010

The Hårsfjärden, or Horsfjärden (Swedish pronunciation: [ˈhɔ̂ʂːˌfjæːɖɛn]), is a fjard off the Baltic Sea near Stockholm, Sweden. About 20 kilometres (12 mi) long, it has surface area of 61.5 square kilometres (23.7 sq mi). It is the location of three Swedish naval bases: Märsgarn, Muskö, and Berga.

== Incidents ==
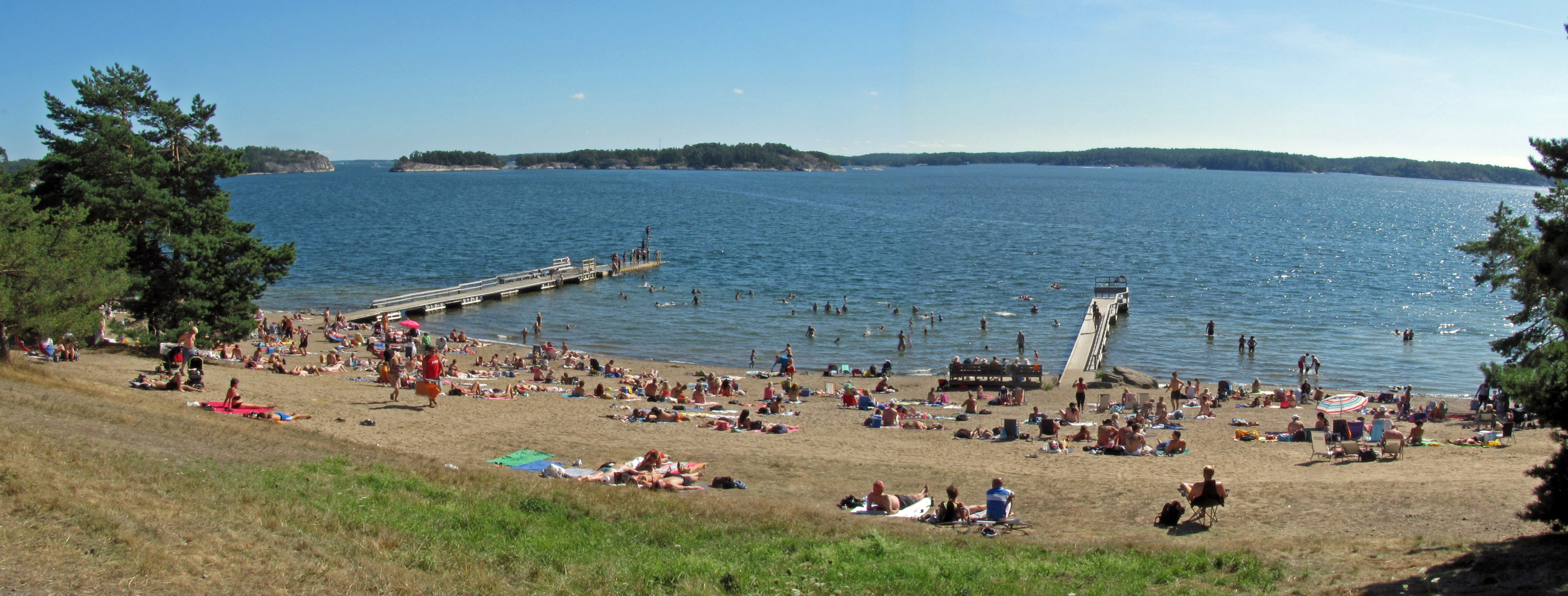
The beach at Årsta havsbad in August 2011.

Three Swedish destroyers were sunk in the Hårsfjärden in an explosion on 17 September 1941, during World War II. The three destroyers sunk at a naval base on the fjord were Göteborg, Klas Horn and Klas Uggla. Göteborg and Klas Horn were later salvaged and returned to service, while Klas Uggla was scrapped.

It was the location of the Hårsfjärden incident, during October 1–13, 1982, in which Swedish forces appeared to have trapped a foreign submarine, believed to be Soviet, but the submarine escaped.
