= Hårsfjärden incident =

1982 engagement between Swedish Navy and unidentified foreign submarine

Coordinates: 59°2′N 18°7′E

The 1982 Hårsfjärden incident (30 September – 30 October 1982) was a peacetime naval engagement in which the Swedish Navy laid a trap for, pursued, and attempted to sink a foreign submarine that had violated Swedish territorial waters. The incident came in the wake of increased Soviet submarine activity in the Baltic Sea, with Sweden alleging that the Soviet Union had violated Sweden's territorial waters several times from 1974 – 1981. The incident, which led to a parliamentary investigation in Sweden, resulted in increased tensions between Sweden and the Soviet Union, and the claimed intrusion of a Soviet submarine remains a contested topic.

== History ==
=== Background ===
Following the development of the Cold War between the United States and Soviet Union, the government of Sweden adopted a stance of armed neutrality, seeking to avoid being pulled into the direct influence of either superpower. Despite this adherence to neutrality, the vast majority of Sweden's military efforts were focused on defending against armed aggression by the Soviet Union. To this end, Sweden maintained a sizable navy, and was concerned with interdicting any foreign forces that violated Swedish territorial waters in the Baltic Sea.

From 1974 to 1981, a series of incidents occurred in which the Swedish Navy claimed to have detected foreign submarines near or inside Swedish territorial waters. Most notably, in 1981 an incident occurred in which the Soviet submarine S-363 became grounded 10 kilometers (6.2 mi) off the coast of Karlskrona Naval Base; further inflaming tensions was that the grounded submarine was well within Swedish territorial waters and possibly armed with nuclear weapons.

The incident in 1981 led to heightened Swedish fears of Soviet infiltration of Swedish waters, a concern which was reflected in the Swedish navy's actions during the Hårsfjärden incident.

=== The incident ===
In 1982, the Swedish government planned to conduct an anti-submarine warfare exercise to test the nation's ability to detect and destroy foreign submarines. This exercise was planned for September 1982, and coincided with NATO military exercises in the Baltic. The complete purpose of the Swedish exercise (termed Operation NOTVARP) remains a matter of debate; some sources speculate the operation was a standard military exercise modified to respond to a false alarm, while others posit the operation was either a pre-planned attempt to entrap a foreign submarine (using unknowing American warships calling in Stockholm as bait) or an opportunistic attempt to engage a trespassing submarine.

During this same time, the Swedish parliament (having been reshuffled after a series of elections) was in a state of flux, effectively leaving the nation without a government from late September to early October.

On the morning of 30 September, Swedish naval units detected an unknown foreign submarine entering Hårsfjärden Bay, where the Swedish Navy had established a hydrophone network and placed naval mines to interdict an intruding submarine. The detection of the submarine caused the Swedish Navy to scramble its forces, though disagreements on how the navy should proceed with the submarine situation delayed an armed response to the intrusion. Once a decision was reached, Swedish forces began to hunt for the submarine; between 1 October and 14 October, numerous sonar contacts and purported sightings (including the detection of an oil slick) prompted the Swedish Navy to drop depth charges, deploy minesweepers, order increased naval patrols, and attempt to seal off Hårsfjärden Bay with a series of metal barriers. The last report of the suspect submarine dates to 14 October, though the search would continue in some capacity until 1 November. During the search, the navy found what may have been caterpillar tracks on the seabed, indicating the incident may have involved midget submarines or undersea vehicles.

==== Identity of the intruder ====
At the time of the incident, most sources indicated that the intruding submarine was from the Soviet Union—this general consensus has continued to the present day. Most sources cite the previous Soviet infiltrations, the length of the search, the acoustic profile of the intruder (garnered from active and passive sonar pings detected during the incident) matching a diesel-powered submarine, and the former Soviet Navy's (and later Russian Navy's) culture of secrecy and inconsistent record keeping at the time of the incident as evidence of the intruder being a Soviet submarine. Other sources have speculated the submarine was present in Sweden during late September in order to track several American warships that were docked in Stockholm and to test the resolve of the then newly-elected Swedish parliament.

In the years after the incident, other sources have theorized that the submarine was from a NATO nation (likely the United States or Great Britain). Swedish professor Ola Tunander posited that a NATO submarine (either serving as an escort for American ships docked in Stockholm or attempting to test the effectiveness of Swedish anti-submarine defenses) had inadvertently found itself trapped in a Swedish defensive system and been attacked; Tunander cited descriptions of the submarine's periscope, the secretive nature of Swedish government documentation of the event, and reports of green water (British and American submarines used green-colored chemical dyes for emergency signaling) being seen near one of the submarine's suspected locations.

=== Aftermath ===
In the aftermath of the Hårsfjärden incident, the Swedish Parliament conducted an investigation into the event and the Swedish Navy's state of preparedness. The incident led to increased Swedish military awareness, and the event has been cited as an example of how the emergency policies of nations can be tested during unexpected international incidents.

== See also ==
- Swedish submarine incidents
- Hårsfjärden disaster
- Øresund drone incident
