= HSwMS Nordenskjöld =

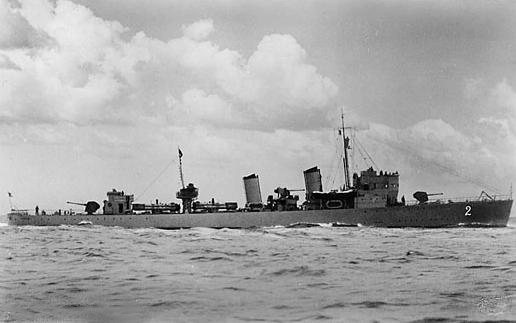
- HSwMS Nordenskjöld with pennant number 2 which she had for some time.

History

Sweden
- Name: Nordenskjöld
- Namesake: Admiral Otto Henrik Nordenskjöld
- Builder: Götaverken, Gothenburg
- Laid down: 1924
- Launched: 19 June 1926
- Commissioned: 27 September 1927
- Decommissioned: 1 April 1963
- Identification: 2, 12, 72
- Fate: Sold for scrap 1964

General characteristics
- Type: Destroyer
- Displacement: 947 long tons (962 t) standard
- Length: 91.4 m (299 ft 10 in) pp.; 91.4 m (300 ft) o/a
- Beam: 8.88 m (29 ft 2 in)
- Draught: 3.8 m (12 ft 6 in)
- Propulsion: 2 shaft, 2× de Laval geared steam turbines, 3 Penhoët boilers; 3,400 shp (2,500 kW)
- Speed: 36 kn (41 mph; 67 km/h)
- Range: 1,600 nmi (1,800 mi; 3,000 km) at 16 kn (18 mph; 30 km/h)
- Complement: 120
- Armament: 3× Bofors M24 120 mm (4.7 in) guns; 2× Vickers 40 mm anti-aircraft guns; 6× 53 cm (21 in) torpedo tubes (2 × 3)

HSwMS Nordenskjöld (12) was a destroyer in the Swedish Navy. Together with the sister ship HSwMS Ehrensköld, she constituted the Ehrensköld class, which, with its size and speed, was a major step in the Swedish destroyer fleet. The ship was launched on 19 June 1926. During the World War II, she participated in the neutrality watch and escorted merchant ships along the Swedish east coast. Especially the ore traffic from Luleå to Germany had to be protected. In the context of the neutrality watch, she therefore participated in the pursuit of Soviet submarines who broke out of the Gulf of Finland in search of merchant ships. Initially, Nordenskjöld had pennant number 12, which was later switched to 2. In 1951–1952, the ship was converted to frigate and then received the pennant number 72. She was decommissioned in 1963 and was sold for scrap the following year.

== Design ==
Nordenskjöld was 91.4 meters long and had a maximum displacement of 1,000 tons. The hull was made of nitrated steel with a precipitating stem and so called "cruiser stern", which meant it was rounded. On the front of the deck was a three-story superstructure that included the bridge, wheelhouse, the medical department and the galley.

The machinery consisted of three oil-fired boilers that delivered steam to two steam turbines, which each propelled its propeller. The machine generated 24,000 horsepower, giving a speed of 35 knots.

Nordenskjöld's main armament was made up of three 12 cm guns, placed on the front deck, between the funnels and on the aft deck. In the stern there was an anti-aircraft bridge with two 40 mm anti-aircraft automatic guns. Furthermore, there were torpedo tubes, depth charge thrower and rack-deployed depth charges. Mines could also be deployed.

== History ==
Nordenskjöld was built at Götaverken in Gothenburg and launched on 19 June 1926. The ship was named after admiral Otto Henrik Nordenskjöld. Initially the ship was named O. H. Nordenskjöld, but the first name was removed the year after the christening.

In the summer of 1929, Nordenskjöld escorted together with the sister ship Ehrensköld the coastal defence ship HSwMS Sverige during a trip to Estonia and Latvia. On board the coastal defence ship was King Gustaf V, and the trip was first to Tallinn and then Riga before the ships returned to Sweden. The following year, the sister ships participated in another international trip. This time, together with the HSwMS Gustav V and HSwMS Drottning Victoria to the then German city of Swinemünde. The purpose of the trip was to collect the dust from Queen Victoria, who had recently died in Rome.

=== World War II ===
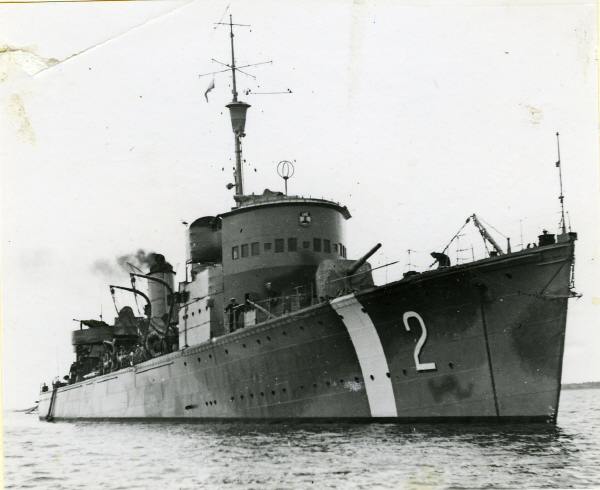
Nordenskjöld during World War II with white neutrality bands and pennant number 2.

At the outbreak of World War II, Nordenskjöld's steam boilers were in such a bad condition that they needed replacements, but when the Swedish Navy suffered a shortage of ships, this had to be postponed. Only at the Epiphany weekend of 1940 was the boiler changed at Götaverken, and on 18 April that year the ship could be put back to service in the Gothenburg Squadron. At the end of April, the ship was in Kalvsund with high readiness for violations of Swedish territory. One night when Nordenskjöld was anchored in the Marstrand fjord, she became over flown by German aircraft. She opened fire with the automatic guns and managed to shoot down one of the aircraft.

In September 1940, the Nordenskjöld escorted the Swedish tanker MT Sveadrott through the barrier that went through Skagerrak during World War II. Sveadrott was loaded with 13,700 tonnes of oil from the Gulf of Mexico on the way to Gothenburg. To allow the passage, the belligerent demanded that the ship was to be escorted through the Skagerrak by Swedish warship, which would serve as a guarantee that no side would try to capture her. For this assignment, the destroyer Nordenskjöld and auxiliary cruiser Waria were appointed. At the end of August, blue-yellow bands were painted on the bow and the stern on the destroyer and searchlights was mounted which illuminated ship's facade. The crews were unaware of the mission, and were only told that they would be gone for at least ten days. On 1 September, the ships left Gothenburg together with tanker Tvåan and went to Kristiansand on the Norwegian south coast. In the waters outside of Strömstad, the captain said to the crew:

A convoy is a piece of Sweden, moved out into the sea. It is inviolable and should any belligerent demand to search the ship, then it will be met with violence.

—

In Kristiansand the two naval ships were bunkered, after which they left for the rendezvous while Tvåan was left behind. In the evening of 5 September, the ships encountered Sveadrott in the North Sea between Bergen and the Shetland Islands, and the home trip began. A British reconnaissance plane and a large number of German bombers were sighted during the trip, but none of them attacked and on 8 September the convoy arrived to Gothenburg. From 1941 and the rest of the war, Nordenskjöld was included in the Karlskrona Squadron, which was part of the South Coast Military District (Sydkustens militärdistrikt). The main duties were neutrality watch and escort of merchant ships along the Swedish coast.

=== After the war ===
From 1951 to 1952 Nordenskjöld was converted to frigate, with the torpedo armament and the aft gun removed and replaced by four 40 mm automatic guns m/36. Furthermore, she was equipped with equipment such as hydrophone and depth charges for anti-submarine warfare. Command center was set up and radar was installed.

=== Fate ===
Nordenskjöld was decommissioned on 1 April 1963, after which she was as a target ship. In 1964 the ship was sold and scrapped in Gothenburg.

== Bibliography ==
- Borgenstam, Curt; Insulander, Per; Kaudern, Gösta (1989). Jagare: med Svenska flottans jagare under 80 år (in Swedish). Västra Frölunda: Marinlitteratur. ISBN 91-970700-4-1. SELIBR 7792227.
- Dahlberg, Hans (1983). I Sverige under 2:a världskriget (in Swedish). Stockholm: Bonnier fakta. ISBN 91-34-50308-0. SELIBR 8350227.
- von Hofsten, Gustaf; Waernberg, Jan; Ohlsson, Curt S. (2003). Örlogsfartyg: svenska maskindrivna fartyg under tretungad flagg. [Forum navales skriftserie], 1650-1837; [6] (in Swedish). Stockholm: Svenskt militärhistoriskt bibl. i samarbete med Marinlitteratur. ISBN 919743843X. SELIBR 8873330.
- Lagvall, Bertil (1991). Flottans neutralitetsvakt 1939-1945: krönika. Marinlitteraturföreningen, 0348-2405; 71 (in Swedish). Stockholm: Marinlitteraturfören. ISBN 91-85944-05-X. SELIBR 7753511.
- Lorents, Yngve; Zeeh, Erik, eds. (1941). Andra världskriget. D. 2 (in Swedish). Stockholm: Natur o. kultur. SELIBR 1360812.
- Parkes, Oscar (1973) [1931]. Jane's Fighting Ships 1931. London: David & Charles (Publishers). ISBN 0-7153-5849-9.
- Steckzén, Birger, ed. (1949). Klart skepp: en bok om Sverigeskeppen Sverige, Gustaf V, Drottning Victoria (in Swedish). Stockholm: Norstedt. SELIBR 1417624.
- Whitley, M. J. (2000). Destroyers of World War Two: An International Encyclopedia. London: Cassell & Co. ISBN 1-85409-521-8.
