= HSwMS Stockholm (J6) =

Swedish Ehrensköld-class destroyer

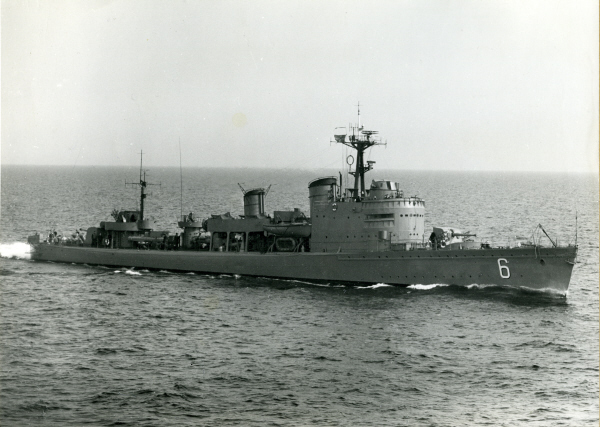
- HSwMS Stockholm

History

Sweden
- Name: Stockholm
- Namesake: Stockholm
- Builder: Karlskronavarvet, Karlskrona
- Laid down: 1934
- Launched: 24 March 1936
- Commissioned: 24 November 1937
- Decommissioned: 1 January 1964
- Fate: Sold to be broken up at Ystad

General characteristics
- Class & type: Göteborg-class destroyer
- Displacement: 1,200 t (1,181 long tons), full load; 1,040 t (1,020 long tons), standard displacement
- Length: 310 ft 4 in (94.6 m) o.a.
- Beam: 29 ft 6 in (9.0 m)
- Draught: 12 ft 6 in (3.8 m)
- Propulsion: 3 oil fired boilers, 2 de Laval steam turbines, 32,000 shp (24,000 kW), 2 screws
- Speed: 39 knots (72 km/h; 45 mph)
- Range: 1,200 nmi (2,200 km; 1,400 mi) at 20 kn (37 km/h; 23 mph)
- Complement: 135
- Armament: 3 × 120 mm (4.7 in) Bofors M/24C DP guns (3×1); 4 × 25 mm (0.98 in) Bofors M/40 (1×2, 2×1); 6 × 533 mm (21 in) torpedo tubes (2×3); 2 × depth charge throwers

HSwMS Stockholm was a destroyer of the Royal Swedish Navy that served during the Second World War and in the Cold War. The second member of the Göteborg or city class, an improvement on the previous Ehrensköld class, Stockholm was launched on 24 March 1936. The ship proved to be of very high performance, exceeding 41 knots (76 km/h; 47 mph) in trials, the fastest ship in the navy. After serving during the Second World War on neutrality patrols, the destroyer took part in two tours with other Swedish warships. The first, which involved sailing to the Netherlands, Norway and the United Kingdom, was led by the cruiser Fylgia in 1948. Four years later, the destroyer accompanied the cruiser Gotland to Belgium. In 1961, the destroyer was redesignated a frigate. Three years later, on 1 January 1964, Stockholm was decommissioned and subsequently sold to be broken up.

== Design and development ==
In 1933, the Swedish Riksdag authorised two new ships based on the successful the Ehrensköld-class destroyer. The new design was to have a higher speed, achieved by introducing superheating and lightening the structure through using welding rather than rivets. Stockholm was ordered at the same time as the lead ship of the class and was the second laid down. The two vessels proved successful and the design was subsequently reordered twice, ultimately leading to a class of 6 vessels.

Displacing 1,040 t (1,020 long tons) standard and 1,200 tonnes (1,200 long tons) full load, Stockholm had an overall length of 94.6 m (310 ft 4 in) and 93 m (305 ft 1 in) between perpendiculars. Beam was 9 m (29 ft 6 in) and maximum draught 3.8 m (12 ft 6 in). Power was provided by three Penhoët oil-fired boilers feeding two de Laval geared steam turbines driving two shafts. The ship had two funnels. New materials allowed the boilers to be superheated to 125 °C (257 °F), which raised the rated power to e 32,000 shaft horsepower (24,000 kW) to give a design speed of 39 knots (72 km/h; 45 mph). A total of 150 tonnes (150 long tons) of fuel oil was carried to give a range of 1,200 nautical miles (2,200 km; 1,400 mi) at 20 knots (37 km/h; 23 mph).

The main armament consisted of three 12 cm (4.7 in) K/45 M24C dual-purpose guns produced by Bofors. These were placed in separate mounts on the ship's centreline, with one on the forecastle, one aft and one between the funnels. The guns were of a loose-barrel type, weighed 3 t (3.0 long tons) and fired a 24 kg (53 lb) projectile at 800 m/s (2,600 ft/s). Air defence consisted six 25 mm (0.98 in) M/40 autocannons, also provided by Bofors in a twin mounting aft of the bridge and two single mounts surrounding the funnels. Two triple rotating torpedo tube mounts for 53 cm (21 in) torpedoes were aft of the superstructure and two depth charge throwers were carried further towards the stern. Approximately forty mines could also be carried for minelaying. The ship had a complement of 135 officers and ratings.

== Construction and career ==
Stockholm was laid down by Karlskronavarvet in Karlskrona in 1934, launched on 24 March 1936 and commissioned on 24 November 1937. The ship was named after the Swedish capital city and allocated the pennant number J6. In trials, Stockholm proved to be the fastest in the navy, exceeding 41 knots (76 km/h; 47 mph), a speed only exceeded by the French Le Fantasque-class destroyers.

During the Second World War, Stockholm was involved in patrolling Swedish waters to protect Swedish neutrality. At the end of the conflict, Stockholm was based at Gothenburg and monitored the German submarine U-3503 which surrendered on 6 May 1945. On 10 May 1948, the destroyer sailed from Gothenburg on the first day of a tour of European cities with sister ship Norrköping under the leadership of the cruiser Fylgia. The tour included five days in Bristol, seven days in Amsterdam and four days in Trondheim, returning on 14 June. On 30 May 1952, the same two destroyers escorted the cruiser Gotland on a visit to a port in another NATO country, this time to Antwerp in Belgium, returning on 2 July.

Unlike the later members of the class, Stockholm was not updated in the early 1950s but was nonetheless rerated a frigate on 1 January 1961 along with the rest of the class. On 1 January 1964, the destroyer was decommissioned and subsequently sold to be broken up at Ystad.
