= Soviet submarine S-363 =

Soviet submarine which ran aground in Karlskrona, Sweden in October 1981

Coordinates: 56°4′23″N 15°43′48″E

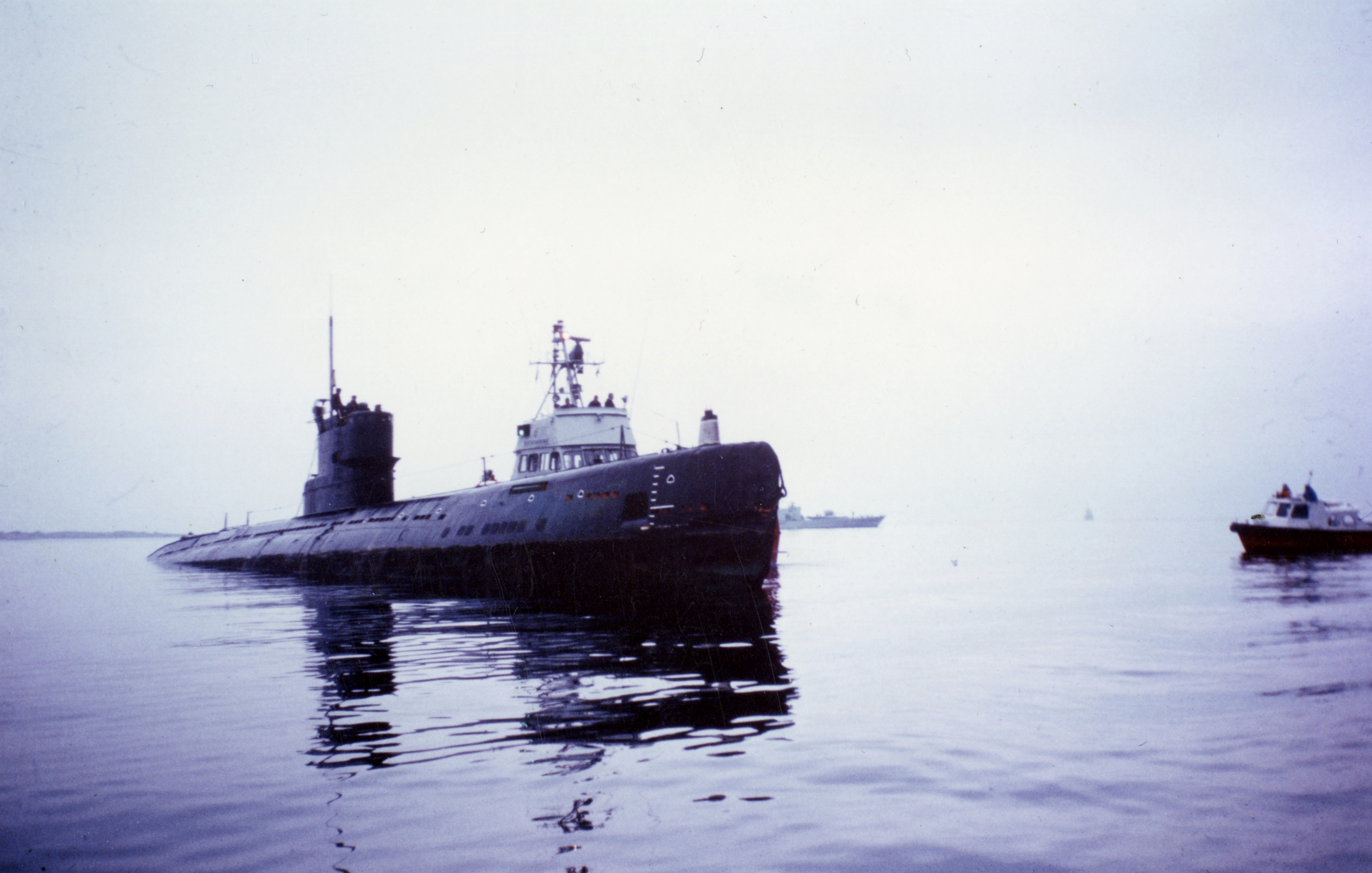
- S-363 grounded

History

Soviet Union
- Name: S-363
- Builder: Ordzhonikidze Yard, Leningrad
- Yard number: 252
- Laid down: 12 January 1956
- Launched: 16 November 1956
- Commissioned: 17 September 1957
- Stricken: 1990s
- Home port: Liepāja
- Fate: Decommissioned 1988; Scrapped, probably in 1989

General characteristics
- Class & type: Whiskey-class submarine
- Displacement: 1,030 t (1,010 long tons)
- Length: 76 m (249 ft 4 in)
- Beam: 6.7 m (22 ft 0 in)
- Draft: 4.6 m (15 ft 1 in)
- Propulsion: Diesel–electric; 2 × 37-D diesels, 2,000 bhp each.; 150 kW electric engines for creep drive.; Engines new 1987
- Speed: 13 knots (24 km/h) submerged; 18 knots (33 km/h) surfaced
- Range: 12,000 nmi (22,000 km) to 15,000 nmi (28,000 km)
- Test depth: ~400–450 m (1,310–1,480 ft)
- Complement: ~60
- Armament: 6 × torpedo tubes; 18 torpedoes or 24 mines

Soviet submarine S-363 was a Soviet Navy Whiskey-class submarine of the Baltic Fleet. It ran aground on 27 October 1981 on the south coast of Sweden, approximately 10 km (6.2 mi) from Karlskrona, one of the largest Swedish naval bases. The unofficial Swedish name for the vessel was U137, as the names of most Soviet submarines were classified. The ensuing international incident is often referred to as the Whiskey on the rocks incident.

== Standoff ==
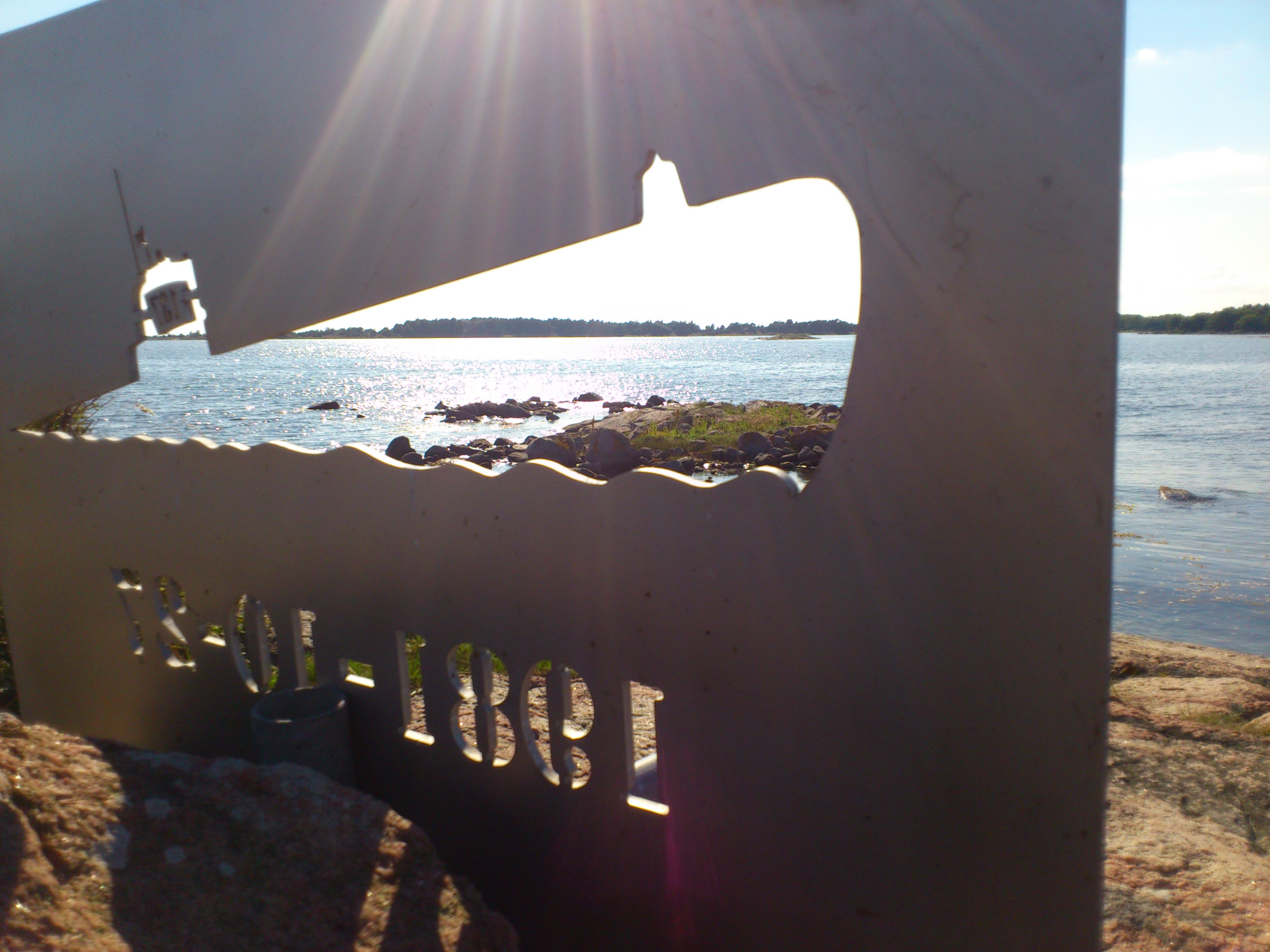
Memorial to the grounding of U137, at Torhamnaskär islet

In October 1981, the Soviet submarine S-363 accidentally hit an underwater rock about 10 kilometres (6.2 mi) from the South Coast Naval Base at Karlskrona and surfaced within Swedish waters. The boat's presence coincided with a Swedish naval exercise which was testing new equipment in the area. Swedish naval forces reacted to the breach of sovereignty by sending an unarmed naval officer aboard the boat to meet the captain and demand an explanation. The captain initially claimed that simultaneous failures of navigational equipment had caused the boat to get lost although the boat had already somehow navigated through a treacherous series of rocks, straits, and islands to get so close to the naval base. The Soviet Navy would later issue a conflicting statement, claiming that the boat had been forced into Swedish waters by severe distress, but the boat had never sent a distress signal and instead attempted to escape.

The Swedes were determined to continue investigating the circumstances of the situation. The Soviet captain, after a guarantee of his immunity, was taken off the boat and interrogated in the presence of Soviet representatives. Additionally, Swedish naval officers examined the logbooks and instruments of the submarine. The Swedish National Defence Research Institute also secretly measured for radioactive materials from outside the hull by using gamma ray spectroscopy from a specially configured Coast Guard boat. They detected something that was almost certainly uranium-238 inside the submarine that was localized to the port torpedo tube. U-238 was routinely used as cladding in nuclear weapons, and the Swedes suspected that the submarine was in fact nuclear-armed. The yield of the probable weapon was estimated to be the same as the bomb dropped over Nagasaki in 1945. Although the presence of nuclear weapons on board S-363 was never officially confirmed by the Soviet authorities, the vessel's political officer, Vasily Besedin, later confirmed that there were nuclear warheads on some of the torpedoes and that the crew had been ordered to destroy the boat, including the warheads, if Swedish forces tried to take control of the vessel.

As the Soviet captain was being interrogated, the weather worsened, and the Soviet submarine sent out a distress call. In Swedish radar control centers, the storm interfered with their radar image. Soviet jamming could also have been a factor. As the Soviet submarine sent its distress call, two ships coming from the direction of the nearby Soviet armada were detected passing the 12-nautical-mile (22 km) limit headed for Karlskrona.

That produced the most dangerous period of the crisis and was when Swedish Prime Minister Thorbjörn Fälldin gave his order to "Hold the border" to the Supreme Commander of the Swedish Armed Forces, General Lennart Ljung. The coastal batteries, fully manned, as well as the mobile coastal artillery guns and mine stations, went to "action stations". The Swedish Air Force scrambled strike aircraft armed with modern anti-ship missiles and reconnaissance aircraft and knew that the weather would not allow rescue helicopters to fly in the event of an engagement.

After a tense 20 minutes, Ljung called Fälldin again and informed him that it was not Soviet surface ships but two West German merchant ships.

The submarine was stuck on the rock for nearly ten days. On 5 November, it was hauled off the rocks by Swedish tugs and escorted to international waters, where it was handed over to the Soviet fleet.

== Interpretations ==
At the time, the incident was generally seen as a proof of widespread Soviet infiltration of the Swedish coastline, and U.S. commentators encouraged Sweden to deploy incident weapons to deter future infiltration. On the basis of an investigation carried out after the incident, the Swedish government concluded that the submarine had entered Swedish waters knowingly to conduct illegal activities.

In an interview in 1990, Vasily Besedin, "then the political officer aboard the submarine, said Soviet warships were waiting in international waters off the Swedish coast." In another interview in 2006 he gave a different picture. The vessel had dual navigation systems, a well-trained crew and the captain Pyotr Gushchin was amongst the best. On board was staff officer Joseph Avrukevich, who was trained in security techniques. Besedin claimed that the incident had been caused by an error in calculations by the navigation officer. Besedin was, however, a political officer with no training in submarine operations.

The area in which the Soviet submarine ran aground was then a restricted military zone, in which no foreign nationals were allowed. The exact location served as one of only two routes that could be used to move large ships from the naval base in Karlskrona to open water.

The incident is popularly known in the West as "Whiskey on the rocks" (the rock-grounded submarine being a Whiskey-class submarine). In the Soviet Navy, the submarine came to be known as "Swedish Komsomolets", a pun on both the incident and the widespread tendency to give to submarines Komsomol-themed names.

== In popular culture ==
- The 2024 Swedish miniseries Whiskey on the Rocks is a comedic retelling of the incident.

== See also ==
- Hårsfjärden incident
- Øresund drone incident
- Swedish submarine incidents

== Bibliography ==
- Friedman, Norman (1995). "Soviet Union 1947–1991: Russian Federation and Successor States 1991–". In Chumbley, Stephen (ed.). Conway's All the World's Fighting Ships 1947–1995. Annapolis, Maryland: Naval Institute Press. pp. 337–426. ISBN 1-55750-132-7.
- Pavlov, A. S. (1997). Warships of the USSR and Russia 1945–1995. Annapolis, Maryland: Naval Institute Press. ISBN 1-55750-671-X.
- Polmar, Norman & Moore, Kenneth J. (2004). Cold War Submarines: The Design and Construction of U.S. and Soviet Submarines. Washington, D. C.: Potomac Books. ISBN 978-1-57488-594-1.
- Polmar, Norman & Noot, Jurrien (1991). Submarines of the Russian and Soviet Navies, 1718–1990. Annapolis, Maryland: Naval Institute Press. ISBN 0-87021-570-1.
