= Unmanned surface vehicle Piraya =

Class overview
- Builders: Kockums
- Operators: Swedish Navy
- Active: 4 (still in testing)

General characteristics
- Displacement: 400kg
- Length: 4 meters
- Beam: 1,4 meters
- Propulsion: diesel or gasoline 20hp engine.
- Speed: +20 knots

Piraya (Swedish for piranha) is the name of an unmanned surface vehicle project under development by the Swedish shipyard company Kockums AB in collaboration with the Swedish military. The project is a small size boat with a 20 horsepower engine that runs without a human crew. The biggest difference between the Piraya and other unmanned surface vehicles is that several Pirayas can be operated at the same time by a single person. The vehicle has stealth capability just like the larger Visby class corvettes. The vessels will be equipped with infrared sensors and hydrophones.

By October 2009, 3 boats were in testing with one more on the way.

== Similar ships ==
- Protector USV
- Spartan Scout
