= HSwMS Klas Horn =

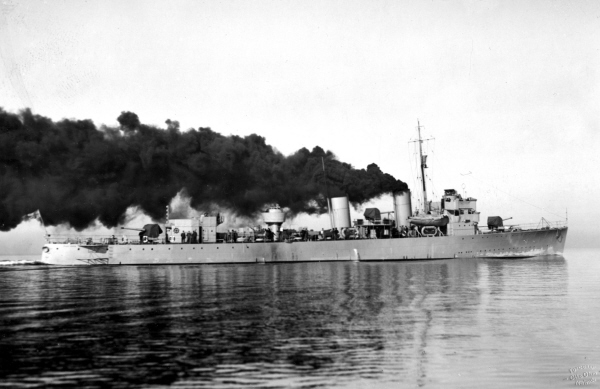

History

Sweden
- Name: Klas Horn
- Builder: Kockums, Malmö
- Launched: 13 June 1931
- Commissioned: 16 September 1932
- Stricken: 15 August 1958
- Identification: Pennant number: 3
- Fate: Scrapped, 1967

General characteristics (as built)
- Class & type: Klas-class destroyer
- Displacement: 1,020 long tons (1,036 t) (standard)
- Length: 92.4 m (303 ft 2 in) (o/a)
- Beam: 8.9 m (29 ft 2 in)
- Draught: 2.6 m (8 ft 6 in)
- Installed power: 3 Penhoët boilers; 26,000 shp (19,388 kW)
- Propulsion: 2 shafts; 2 geared steam turbines
- Speed: 36 knots (67 km/h; 41 mph)
- Range: 1,600 nmi (3,000 km; 1,800 mi) at 20 knots (37 km/h; 23 mph)
- Complement: 130
- Armament: 3 × single 120 mm (4.7 in) guns; 2 × single 40 mm (1.6 in) AA guns; 2 × single 8 mm (0.31 in) machine guns; 2 × triple 533 mm (21 in) torpedo tubes; 2 × depth charge throwers; 40–46 × naval mines

Klas Horn was one of two Klas-class destroyers built for the Royal Swedish Navy during the 1930s. Completed in 1932, she conducted neutrality patrols during World War II before she was sunk by an explosion in 1941. The ship was repaired and returned to service two years later.

== Design and description ==
The Klas-class destroyer was an improved version of the preceding Ehrensköld class. The ships displaced 1,020 long tons (1,040 t) at standard load. They measured 92.4 meters (303 ft 2 in) long overall with a beam of 8.9 meters (29 ft 2 in), and a draft of 2.6 meters (8 ft 6 in). The Klas's were propelled by two de Laval geared steam turbines, each driving one propeller shaft using steam from three Penhöet water-tube boilers. The engines were designed to produce a total of 26,000 shaft horsepower (19,000 kW) for an intended maximum speed of 36 knots (67 km/h; 41 mph). During their sea trials, they reached 37.3 knots (69.1 km/h; 42.9 mph). The ships carried enough fuel oil to give them a range of 1,600 nautical miles (3,000 km; 1,800 mi) at 20 knots (37 km/h; 23 mph). The ships' crew numbered 119.

The main armament of the Klas class consisted of three Bofors 120-millimeter (4.7 in) M/24B guns in single mounts. One gun each was located at the forecastle and stern; the third gun was positioned on a platform between the funnels. Anti-aircraft defense was provided by two 40-millimeter (1.6 in) M/22-M/30 AA guns and two 8-millimeter (0.31 in) M/14-M/29 machine guns. The ships were equipped with six 533-millimeter (21 in) torpedo tubes in two rotating, triple-tube mounts located between the rear funnel and the stern gun. Two depth charge throwers were fitted and the ships could carry 40–46 mines.

== Construction and career ==
Klas Horn was launched on 13 June 1931 by Kockums Mekaniska Verkstad at its shipyard in Malmö. The ship was commissioned on 16 September 1932. She conducted neutrality patrols during World War II before she was sunk by an explosion on 17 September 1941. Klas Horn was refloated and returned to service in December 1943.
