= Göteborg-class destroyer =

Swedish naval ship class (1936–1968)

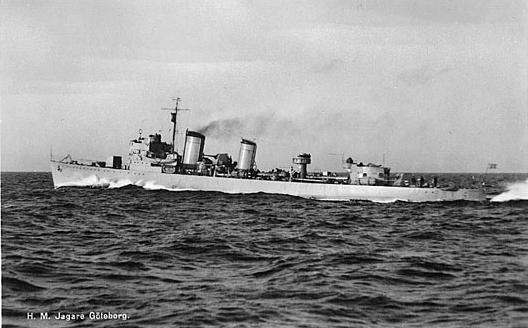
- Göteborg

Class overview
- Operators: Swedish Navy
- Preceded by: Klas class
- Succeeded by: Visby class
- Built: 1933–1941
- In commission: 1936–1968
- Planned: 6
- Completed: 6
- Retired: 6

General characteristics (as built)
- Type: Destroyer
- Displacement: 1,040 long tons (1,060 t) (standard)
- Length: 92.7 m (304 ft 2 in)
- Beam: 9 m (29 ft 6 in)
- Draught: 3.8 m (12 ft 6 in)
- Propulsion: 2 screws; 2 geared steam turbines
- Speed: 39 knots (72 km/h; 45 mph)
- Range: 1,200 nmi (2,200 km; 1,400 mi) at 20 knots (37 km/h; 23 mph)
- Complement: 130
- Armament: 3 × single 120 mm (4.7 in) guns; 3 × twin Bofors 25 mm (1 in) AA guns; 2 × triple 533 mm (21 in) torpedo tubes; 20 × naval mines

The Göteborg class was a Swedish World War II destroyer class. Built from 1936 to 1941 the class was designed as escort and neutral guard destroyers. In total six ships were constructed, HSwMS Göteborg, HSwMS Stockholm, HSwMS Malmö, HSwMS Karlskrona, HSwMS Gävle and HSwMS Norrköping. After World War II the destroyers, later rebuilt as frigates, continued to serve in the Swedish navy. The last ship was decommissioned in 1968.

== History ==
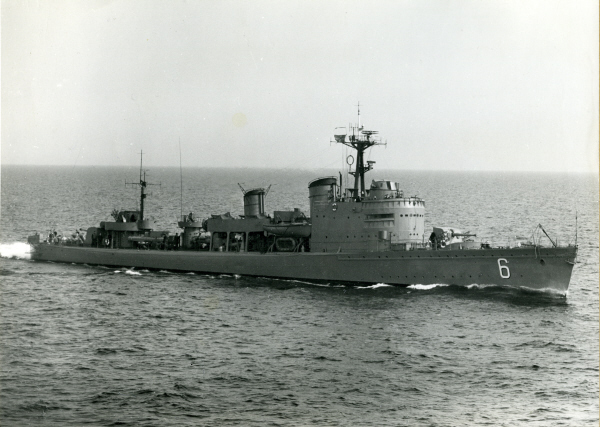
Stockholm after modernization

In 1933 the Swedish government granted the construction of two new destroyers. The destroyers were given names of Swedish coast towns and so this class was called Stadsjagare ("Town-class destroyers"). The first ship was delivered in 1936 and the second in 1937. In 1936 two additional destroyers were ordered and after the war broke out a third pair was ordered as well. After the war all destroyers except Göteborg which was in poor shape from the Hårsfjärden disaster received a refit where the center gun was moved to the X position on the aft deckhouse and the anti-aircraft armament (consisting of four modern Bofors 40 mm L/70 guns) was concentrated on a platform around the rear funnel. In 1958–1963 three of the destroyers were rebuilt as frigates that included a change of armament. The first ship to be decommissioned was Göteborg in 1958. In the decade that followed all ships were decommissioned, the last in 1968.

The famous Swedish marine engineer Curt Borgenstam called the Göteborg class the most beautiful and well working destroyer class to have served in the Swedish navy.

== Ships ==
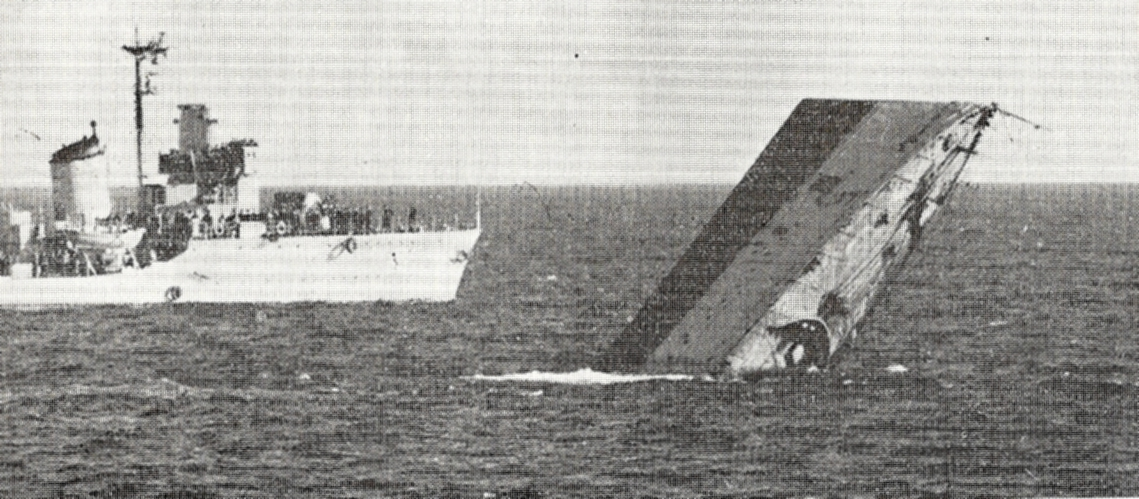
HSwMS Göteborg sinking after being used as a target ship

Name	Number	Builder	Laid Down	Launched	Commissioned	Fate
Göteborg	5	Götaverken	1934	14 October 1935	October 1936	Stricken 15 August 1958; Sunk as target 14 August 1962
Stockholm	6	Karlskrona dockyard	1934	24 March 1936	27 November 1937	Stricken 1 January 1964; Scrapped 1965
Malmö	7	Eriksberg	1937	22 September 1938	15 August 1939	Stricken 1 January 1964; Scrapped 1970
Karlskrona	8	Karlskrona dockyard	1937	19 June 1939	12 September 1940	Stricken 1 July 1974; Scrapped 1979
Gävle	9	Götaverken	1939	23 September 1940	30 June 1941	Stricken 6 December 1968; Used as generator at Simpevarp nuclear power station
Norrköping	10	Eriksberg	1939	25 September 1940	9 April 1941	Stricken 1 February 1965

== Sources ==
- Borgenstam, Curt; Insulander, Per; Kaudern, Gösta (1989), Jagare: med Svenska flottans jagare under 80 år (in Swedish), Västra Frölunda: Marinlitteratur, ISBN 91-970700-4-1, SELIBR 7792227
- Campbell, John (1985). Naval Weapons of World War II. Annapolis, Maryland: Naval Institute Press. ISBN 0-87021-459-4.
- Gardiner, Robert; Chumbley, Stephen (1995), Conway's All The World's Fighting Ships 1947–1995, Annapolis, Maryland, USA: Naval Institute Press, ISBN 1-55750-132-7
- Westerlund, Karl-Erik (1980). "Sweden". In Chesneau, Roger (ed.). Conway's All the World's Fighting Ships, 1922–1946. Greenwich, UK: Conway Maritime Press. pp. 368–377. ISBN 0-85177-146-7.
- Westerlund, Karl-Erik (1985). "Sweden". In Gray, Randal (ed.). Conway's All the World's Fighting Ships 1906–1921. London: Conway Maritime Press. pp. 355–363. ISBN 978-0-85177-245-5.
- Whitley, M. J. (2000). Destroyers of World War Two: An International Encyclopedia. London: Cassell & Co. ISBN 1-85409-521-8.
