= Saab Kockums =

Shipyard in Malmö, Sweden

Saab Kockums AB
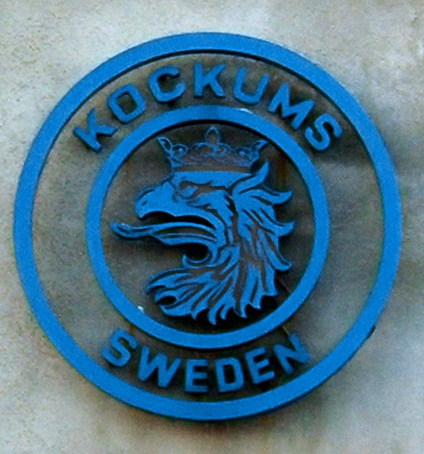
- Former logo, sign on old HQ.
- Type: Public company
- Industry: Shipyard
- Founded: 1840
- Headquarters: Malmö, Sweden
- Owner: Saab AB
- Parent: Saab AB
- Subsidiaries: Dockstavarvet

Saab Kockums AB is a shipyard headquartered in Malmö, Sweden, owned by the Swedish defence company Saab AB. Saab Kockums AB is further operational in Muskö, Docksta, and Karlskrona. While having a history of civil vessel construction, Kockums' most renowned activity is the fabrication of military corvettes and submarines.

Kockums worked with Northrop Grumman and Howaldtswerke-Deutsche Werft (HDW) to offer a Visby-class corvette derivative in the American Focused Mission Vessel Study, a precursor to the Littoral Combat Ship program. It competed with several other concepts, including Norway's Skjold class (part of a Raytheon-led group).

== History ==
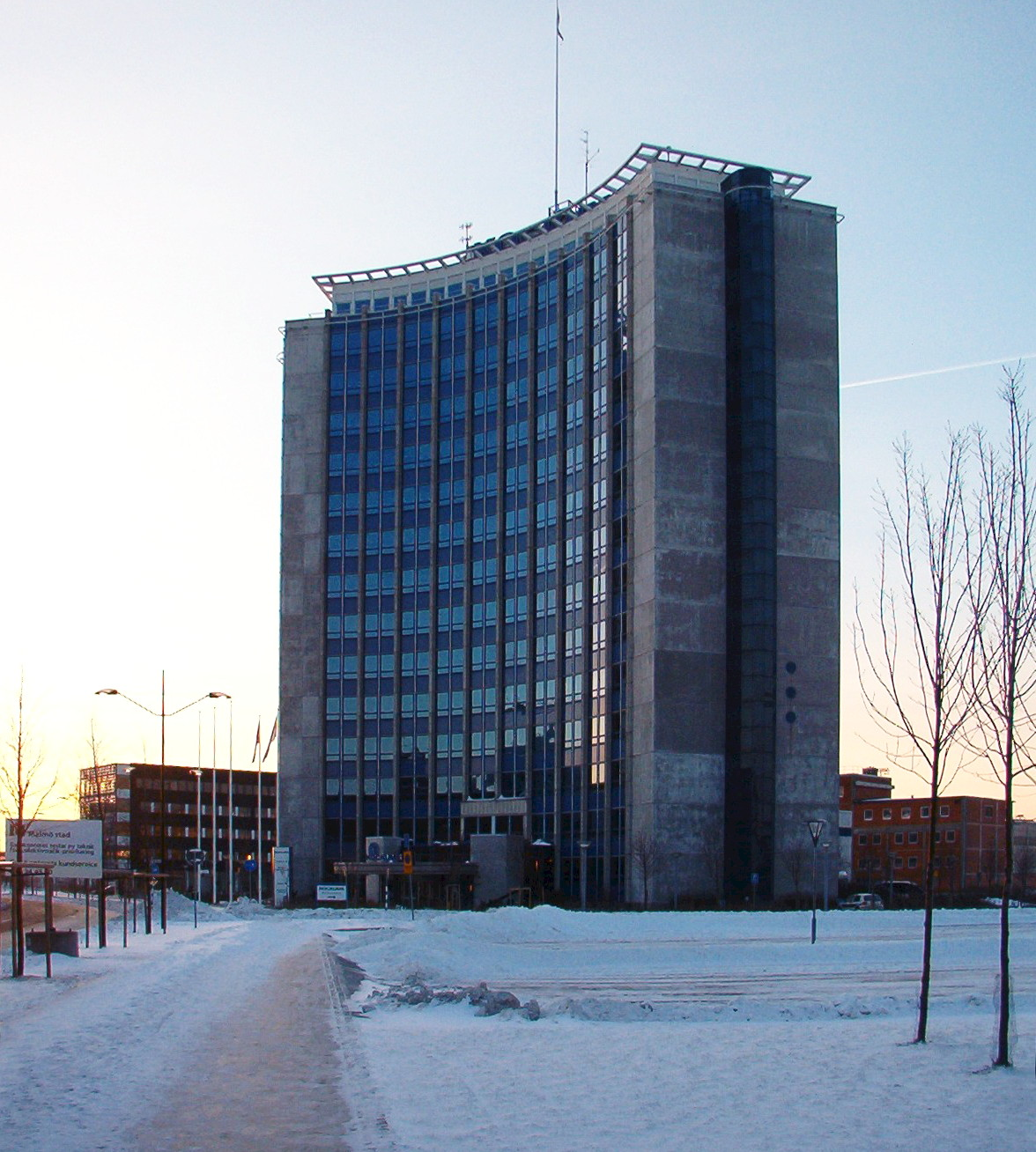
The Gängtappen (formerly Kockumshuset) building in Malmö, used as Kockums' HQ from 1958 to 2015. Since 2019 occupied by Länsförsäkringar Skåne.

=== Kockums during the 19th century ===
During the 1820s the Kockums family established themselves as businesspeople in Malmö. Frans Henrik Kockum built a large fortune through an investment in tobacco production. Thanks to this he was able to purchase a large part of land 1838 south of Malmö, and between 1840 and 1841 he erected a forge and a mechanical workshop which initially primarily manufactured farming equipment, stoves, portable engines, incubators, spittoons, and various other castings. From 1859 they even constructed railway carriages. This workshop was situated near the current area of Davidshall. In the year 1866, the company went public and changed their name to Kockums Mekaniska Werkstad.

The first railway carriage was delivered in 1859, the first sleeper car 1877, the first Bogie carriage in 1885, and the first dining car in 1896.

Kockum bought Kallinge kvarn (near Ronneby) along with two business partners in the year 1849. They built a copper refinery. Kockum's business partners were bought out of the country in 1852, and the company continued to expand during the next century. in 1858, the production changed from copper refinery to being an iron mill. This company continued to grow until it eventually became Kockums Jernverks AB, in 1875. The company had its foundations in Blekinge and Småland.

List of Kockums-built ships as of 1873.

=== Structural change ===
In the years preceding the First World War, the Kockum-owned companies underwent a structural change. Kockums Mekaniska Verkstad AB shifted focus to primarily constructing ships, railway carriages, and bridges. Kockums Jernverk och Emaljerverk (with primary operations in Kallinge and Ronneby) specialized in steel and steel products, galvanizing, and enameling.

The shipyard and bridge production expanded heavily during the post-war period. During the years 1899 - 1913 a total of 16 new ships were constructed, six of which for the Swedish Navy. Namely the coastal battleships Tapperheten and Manligheten, the destroyers Wale, Munin, Vidar, Ragnar, as well as the steam ferry Malmö. Following that the shipyard had continued success, delivering the coastal battleships Gustav V, the destroyers Ehrensköld and Klas Horn, the icebreaker Ymer, some 25 submarines, and several motor torpedo boats. A large amount of tankers were also built starting in 1927. Production of bridges, cranes, sugar refinery machinery, and steam engines continued.

In the 1950s the shipyard in Malmö had grown to be one of the largest in the world, primarily constructing large cargo vessels. In 1952 and 1953 Kockum delivered the largest amount of tonnage out of all shipyards, internationally. Parallel with the shipbuilding a shipping line was also operated.

After acquiring AB Landsverk in 1948, a miscellaneous workshop industry developed out of the shipyard.

=== The submarine conflict ===
As a result of the Swedish shipyard crisis which heavily affected the industry during 1969–1985, due to heavy competition from shipyards in the Far East, the 1973 oil crisis and the ensuing recession, Kockums was placed under the control of the Swedish state through the state-owned company Svenska Varv and its successor company Celsius AB from 1979 until 1999. Having implemented a highly advanced variety of the Stirling engine for low noise submarine propulsion, Kockums was considered to have strategic value for the Swedish Navy. In the mid-1980s, Kockums formed a joint venture company called the Australian Submarine Corporation along with the Australian branch of Chicago Bridge & Iron, Wormald International, and the Australian Industry Development Corporation to construct the Collins-class submarines for the Royal Australian Navy. In 1989, Kockums acquired Karlskronavarvet, the operator of the Karlskrona shipyards, mainly for its then-pioneering fibreglass technology. In 1999, following the acquisition of Celsius AB by Saab, Kockums was sold to the German shipbuilding company HDW. In 2005, HDW was bought by the German industrial conglomerate Thyssen Krupp. The time after 1999 was rife with conflicts between Kockums' only Swedish customer, the Defence Materiel Administration (FMV), and Kockums' German owners. The Swedish view was that the technical advancements made in collaboration between Kockums and FMV ought to be used to create a new generation of submarine for lucrative export: the A26 submarine. On the German side, the A26 project was said to be regarded as a high-risk project that could lead to uncontrollably growing costs. Superficially, the major source of conflict seemed to be that neither ThyssenKrupp nor FMV would accept carrying unforeseen development costs. As several technical innovations to be implemented in the A26 were kept in classified status at the FMV, ThyssenKrupp argued that the implied costs were too difficult to predict. This deadlock persisted for months until the FMV decided to cancel the order of the A26 submarines.

Globally, the conflict also concerned its general business strategy. ThyssenKrupp insisted that Kockums ought to discontinue large submarine construction and to focus on the development of small submarines. Meanwhile, anonymous sources from inside Kockums claimed that ThyssenKrupp's goal in acquiring Kockums was never to reach synergies with HDW, but only to eliminate its main competitor.

When Russia annexed Crimea in March 2014, Sweden's defence interests in the future of Kockums came under closer scrutiny. The turning point was described by the chairman of the Swedish parliament's Standing Committee on Defense (SCD), Peter Hultquist:

The wheels have turned. The government, possibly in response to Russia's aggression in Ukraine, has decided that a strong industrial defense capacity that is Swedish-controlled will be the cornerstone that underpins defense policy and future capability.

In the search for a partner to develop the next generation of submarines, the FMV approached the SAAB Group. During autumn 2013, Saab tried to reach an agreement to buy Kockums from ThyssenKrupp. ThyssenKrupp demanded to keep its monopoly position in the A26 deal, which Saab refused to accept, causing the negotiations to fail. Saab responded by approaching Kockums' engineers, offering them employment at Saab Naval Systems. Thyssen Krupp tried in vain to keep its engineers at Kockums, proposing an extra month's salary.

The hostility towards ThyssenKrupp reached a new level during the Kockums equipment repossession incident on 8 April 2014. As per protocol, two military trucks accompanied by armed soldiers entered the Kockums shipyard in Malmö to reclaim all materiel and equipment belonging to the Defence Materiel Administration (Sweden), FMV, as well as all secret blueprints and images. By orders from a manager, Kockums staff tried to sabotage the repossession by locking the gates with the repossession crew and escort still inside. According to a spokesperson for FMV, this is the first time they have had to forcefully repossess equipment.

Shortly after, ThyssenKrupp initiated discussions to sell Kockums to Saab. The deal was finalized on 22 July 2014, making Saab the new owner of Kockums.

== Exports ==
Australia: In November 2014, Saab formally made a bid for SEA 1000, the Royal Australian Navy's replacement program for the six Collins-class submarines in service. Defence Minister David Johnston stated that, "We need to decide quickly and whatever we do decide will be in the best interests of the entire nation". The Australian Government had been ready to buy the more expensive Sōryū-class submarines offered by the Japanese Maritime Self Defence Force, however, internal opposition had forced the government to have an open tender for the multi-billion-dollar program. Australia subsequently selected Naval Group (formerly DCNS) of France and their Shortfin Barracuda-class submarines to replace the Collins-class, although this deal was later rescinded.

In December 2014, it was announced that leading global Dutch shipbuilder Damen Group had entered into an agreement with Saab to develop, offer and build next-generation submarines, initially focusing on the planned replacement of four Walrus-class submarines currently used by the Royal Netherlands Navy.

== The Kockums Crane ==
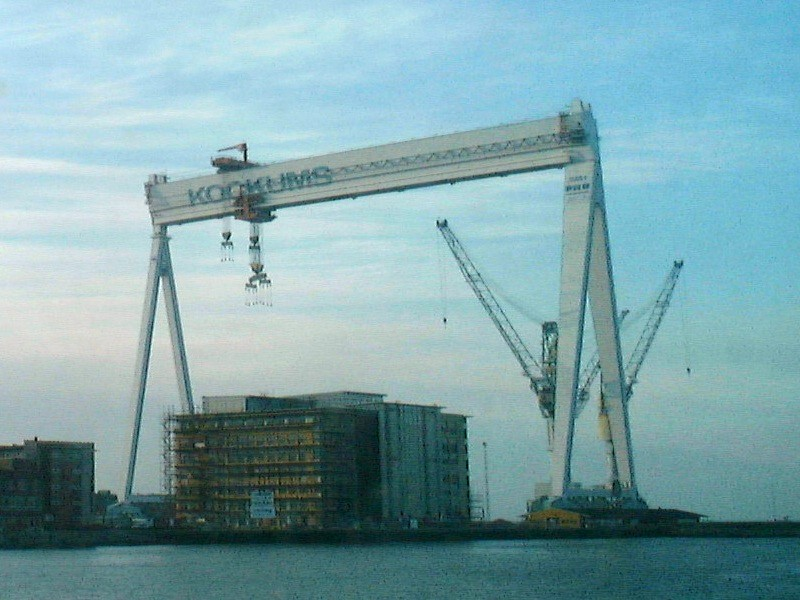
The crane in February 2000.

The shipyard formerly possessed a 138-metre high crane, known as the Kockums Crane, built in 1973/74 and capable of lifting 1500 tons, making it the largest crane in the world when it was installed in 1974. The crane was not used much because of the Swedish shipyard crisis of the late 1970s and 1980s. It was used the last time in 1997 for lifting the foundations of the high pillars of the Öresund Bridge.

The crane was sold the first time in the early 1990s to the Danish company Burmeister & Wain, but the company went bankrupt shortly thereafter. It was later sold to a Korean company, Hyundai Heavy Industries. The crane was a landmark of Malmö from its time of construction until its dismantling before being shipped to Ulsan in South Korea in the summer of 2002.

== Ships built by Kockums ==
- MT Frans Suell
- MV Sovetskaya Latviya
- Visby-class of stealth corvettes
- Landsort-class mine countermeasures vessel
- Styrsö-class mine countermeasures vessel
- Näcken-class submarine
- Västergötland-class submarine
- Södermanland-class submarine
- Gotland-class submarine
- HSwMS Orion (A201)
- Unmanned surface vehicle Piraya
- MS Celebration
- MS Jubilee
- Ms Wawel

== Ships built with Kockums technology ==
- Collins-class submarines
- Archer-class submarines (updated Västergötland class)
- Sōryū-class submarine

== Future ships ==
- Blekinge-class submarine (A26 submarine, replacement of the Södermanland-class submarine)
