= HSwMS Gotland =

There have been at least two ships of the Swedish Navy named HSwMS Gotland after the island in the Baltic Sea.

- HSwMS Gotland (1933) – a seaplane cruiser launched in 1933 and scrapped in 1963
- HSwMS Gotland (Gtd) – a Gotland-class attack submarine launched in 1995 and as of 2019 in active service
