= HSwMS Göteborg (J5) =

Swedish destroyer

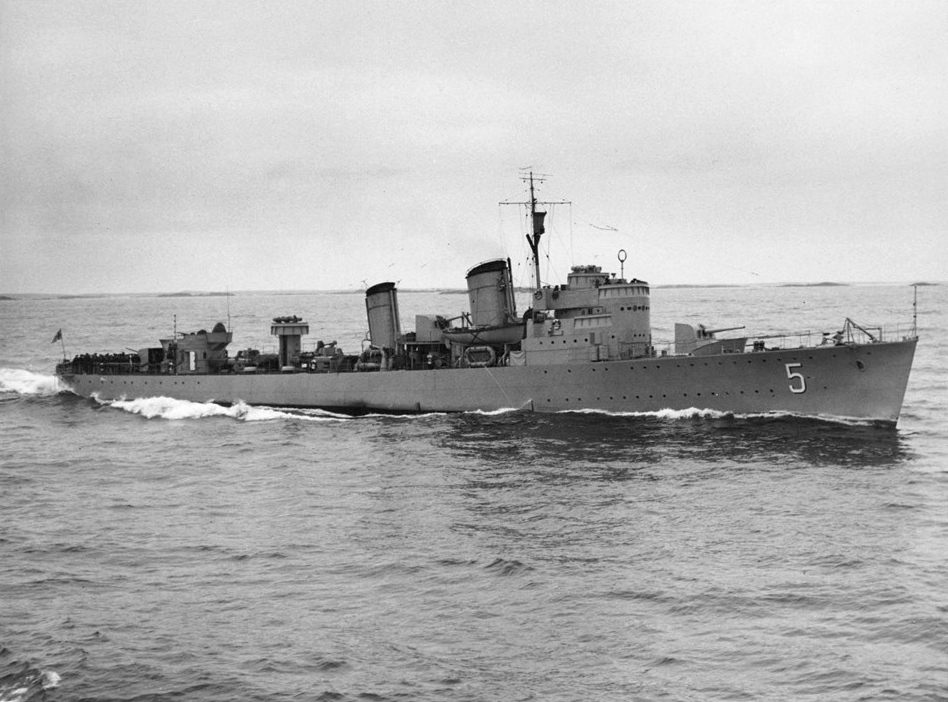
- HSwMS Göteborg

History

Sweden
- Name: Göteborg
- Namesake: Gothenburg
- Builder: Götaverken, Gothenburg
- Laid down: 1934
- Launched: 14 October 1935
- Commissioned: 30 October 1936
- Decommissioned: 15 August 1958
- Fate: Sunk as a target 14 August 1962

General characteristics
- Class & type: Göteborg-class destroyer
- Displacement: 1,200 t (1,181 long tons), full load; 1,040 t (1,020 long tons), standard displacement
- Length: 310 ft 4 in (94.6 m) o.a.
- Beam: 29 ft 6 in (9.0 m)
- Draught: 12 ft 6 in (3.8 m)
- Propulsion: 3 oil fired boilers, 2 de Laval geared steam turbines, 32,000 shp (24,000 kW), 2 screws
- Speed: 39 knots (72 km/h; 45 mph)
- Range: 1,200 nmi (2,200 km; 1,400 mi) at 20 kn (37 km/h; 23 mph)
- Complement: 135
- Armament: 3 × 120 mm (4.7 in) Bofors M/24C DP (3×1); 4 × 25 mm (0.98 in) Bofors M/40 (1×2, 2×1); 6 × 533 mm (21 in) torpedo tubes (2×3); 2 × depth charge throwers

HSwMS Göteborg was a destroyer of the Royal Swedish Navy that served during the Second World War and in the Cold War. The lead ship of the class, Göteborg was launched on 14 October 1935 as an improvement on the previous Ehrensköld class. The destroyer was sunk during the Hårsfjärden disaster of 17 September 1941 when an explosion amongst the torpedoes mounted aft led to the loss of thirty lives, the largest number in Swedish territorial waters during the war. The destroyer was repaired and re-entered operations protecting Sweden's neutrality until the end of the war. The destroyer served until 15 August 1958 when the vessel was retired. Göteborg was subsequently sunk as a target on 14 August 1962. The name of the ship was also used as a cover by the German destroyer Z18 Hans Lüdemann during the invasion of Norway in April 1940.

== Design and development ==
In 1933, the Swedish Riksdag authorised two ships based on the design of the Ehrensköld-class destroyer.The new design was to have a higher speed, achieved by introducing superheating and lightening the structure through using welding rather than rivets. The design proved successful and was subsequently reordered, ultimately leading to a class of 6 vessels named after towns. Göteborg was the lead ship of the class and the first laid down.

Displacing 1,040 t (1,020 long tons) standard and 1,200 tonnes (1,200 long tons) full load, Göteborg had an overall length of 94.6 m (310 ft 4 in) and 93 m (305 ft 1 in) between perpendiculars. Beam was 9 m (29 ft 6 in) and maximum draught 3.8 m (12 ft 6 in). Power was provided by three Penhoët oil-fired boilers feeding two de Laval geared steam turbines driving two shafts. The ship had two funnels. New materials allowed the boilers to be superheated to 125 °C (257 °F), which raised the rated power to 32,000 shaft horsepower (24,000 kW) to give a design speed of 39 knots (72 km/h; 45 mph). A total of 150 tonnes (150 long tons) of fuel oil was carried to give a range of 1,200 nautical miles (2,200 km; 1,400 mi) at 20 knots (37 km/h; 23 mph).

The main armament consisted of three 12 cm (4.7 in) K/45 M24C dual-purpose guns produced by Bofors. These were placed in separate mounts on the ship's centreline, with one on the forecastle, one aft and one between the funnels. The guns were of a loose-barrel type, weighed 3 t (3.0 long tons) and fired a 24 kg (53 lb) projectile at 800 m/s (2,600 ft/s). Air defence consisted six 25 mm (1 in) M/40 autocannons, also provided by Bofors. These were in a twin mounting aft of the bridge and two single mounts to port and starboard. Two triple rotating torpedo tube mounts for 53 cm (21 in) torpedoes were aft of the superstructure and two depth charge throwers were carried further towards the stern. Approximately forty mines could also be carried for minelaying. The ship had a complement of 135 officers and ratings.

== Construction and career ==
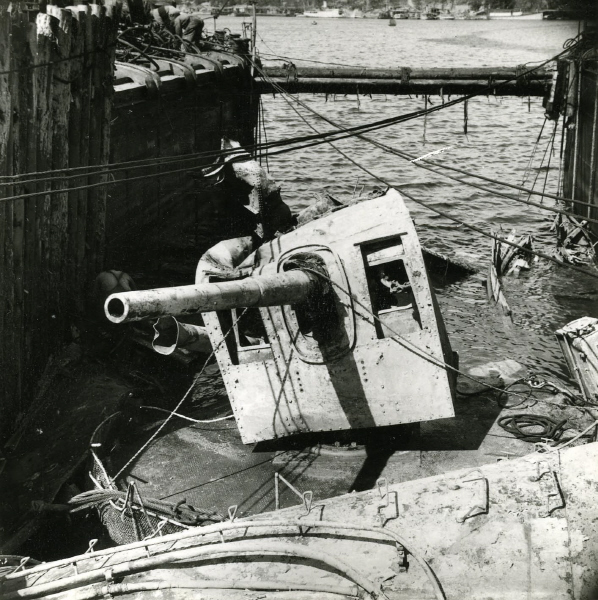
The destroyer's forward gun after the explosion

Göteborg was laid down by Götaverken in Gothenburg in 1934, launched on 14 October 1935 and commissioned on 30 October 1936. The ship was named for the city, called Gothenburg in English, and allocated the pennant number J5. Initially serving with the Coastal Fleet, the destroyer was transferred to the Gothenburg Squadron on 27 August 1940. On 8 April 1940, during the invasion of Norway, a ship claiming to be Göteborg was fired on by the British destroyer HMS Glowworm. The vessel was actually the German destroyer Z18 Hans Lüdemann, which escaped unscathed into the mist.

On 17 September 1941, the destroyer was on patrol and drove off a Focke-Wulf Fw 200 Condor maritime patrol aircraft which was harassing a convoy. On 27 September, Göteborg was at the centre of the Hårsfjärden disaster. The destroyer was docked at Hårsfjärden when the torpedoes exploded, followed by a similar explosion aboard the destroyer Klas Horn which was nearby. Göteborg sank in the harbour. Burning oil spilt onto the water, and 33 lives were lost, although it would have been worse had the majority of the crew not been on shore leave at the time. Nonetheless, it was the worst loss of life the country experienced in its territorial waters during the conflict.

On 18 September 1943, the ship was recommissioned after extensive repairs. Göteborg achieved an even higher speed of 40 knots (74 km/h; 46 mph) during trials. The vessel resumed service and, at the end of the conflict, approached the German submarine U-3503 at Gothenburg when that boat surrendered on 6 May 1945. However, the damage had taken its toll. When the rest of the class were modernised and re-equipped to become anti-submarine frigates during the Cold War between 1948 and 1951, Göteborg was not. Instead, the ship was decommissioned on 15 August 1958 and subsequently sunk as a target on 14 August 1962.
