= Hårsfjärden disaster =

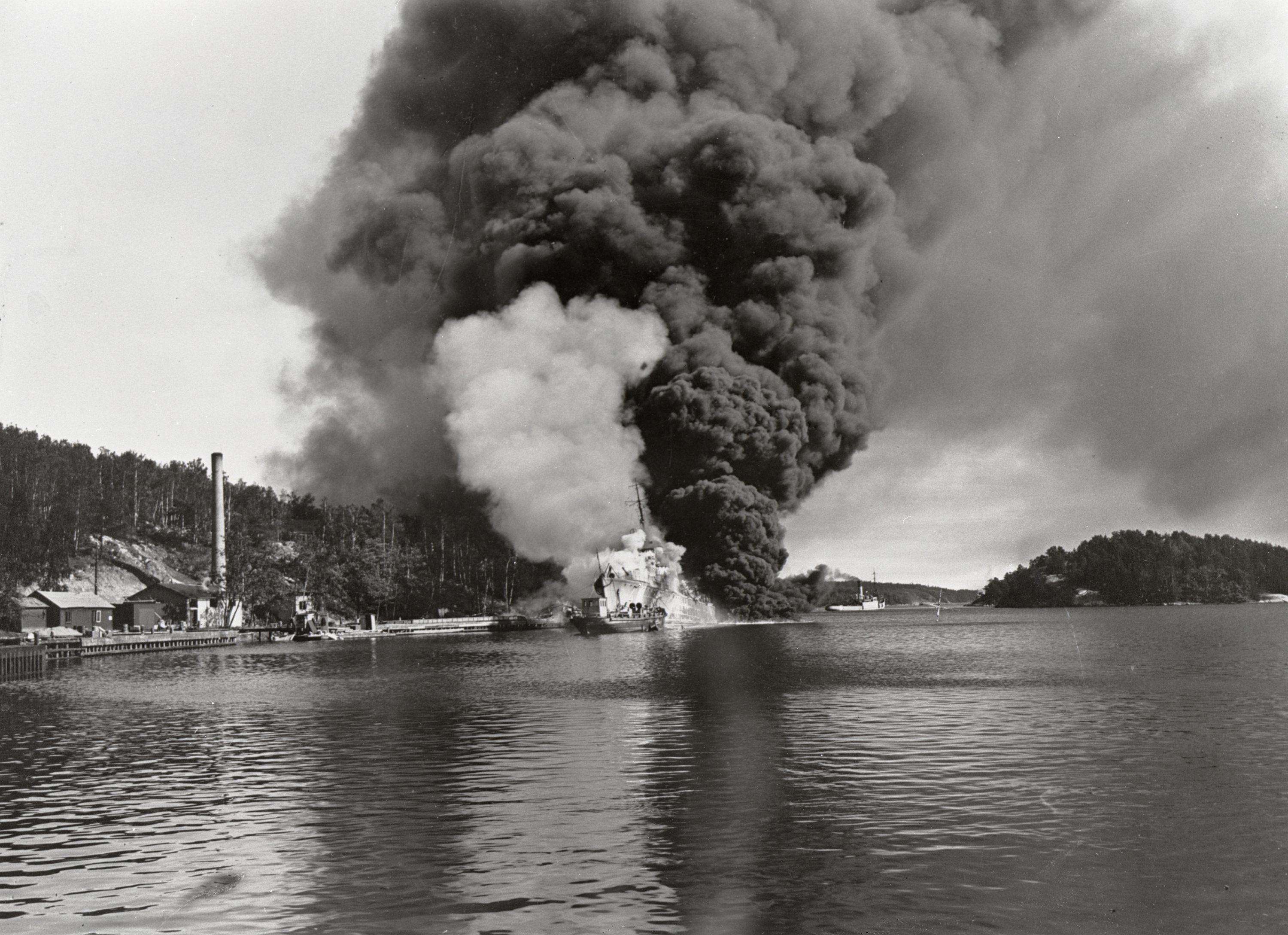
The destroyer HSwMS Klas Uggla in flames during the Hårsfjärden disaster.

The Hårsfjärden disaster was an event in the Swedish Navy during World War II. A series of accidental explosions, it caused by far the worst damage to Swedish Navy units during the era of that war, in which Sweden was not a combatant.

The disaster occurred on 17 September 1941. Three Swedish Navy destroyers were berthed in Hårsfjärden fjord near Stockholm when the torpedoes or oil tanks of Göteborg exploded; flames then also enveloped Klas Horn and Klas Uggla in an inferno.

The three destroyers were sunk, and thirty-three sailors killed, a major blow to the Swedish Navy. All three ships were later raised. Klas Uggla never again saw service; the other two ships did, after repairs.

An investigation into possible sabotage commenced. Theories also emerged that the cause was a bomb dropped accidentally by a Swedish plane on training maneuvers, or a torpedo demonstration gone wrong. But the cause was never established.
