= Ehrensköld-class destroyer =

1924 class of Swedish Navy destroyers

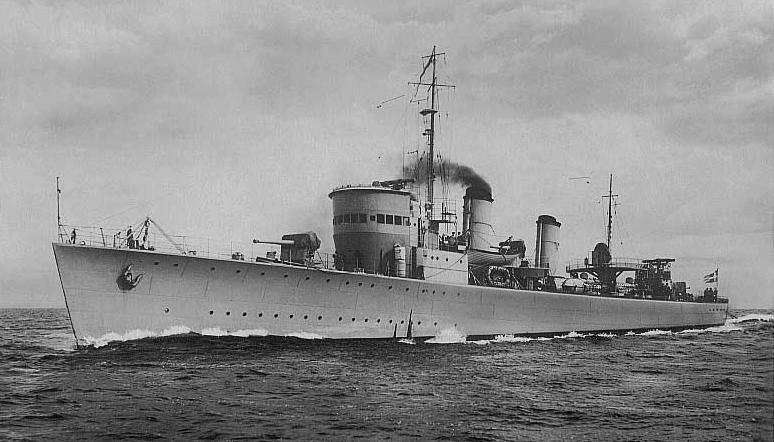
- Ehrensköld

Class overview
- Name: Ehrensköld class
- Operators: Swedish Navy
- Preceded by: Wrangel class
- Succeeded by: Klas class
- Built: 1924–1927
- In commission: 1927–1963
- Completed: 2
- Scrapped: 2

General characteristics
- Type: Destroyer
- Displacement: 974 long tons (990 t) (standard)
- Length: 91 m (300 ft) (o/a)
- Beam: 8.88 m (29 ft 2 in)
- Draught: 3.8 m (12 ft 6 in)
- Installed power: 3 Penhoët boilers; 34,000 shp (25,000 kW)
- Propulsion: 2 shafts; 2 geared steam turbines,
- Speed: 36 knots (67 km/h; 41 mph)
- Range: 1,600 nmi (3,000 km; 1,800 mi) at 16 knots (30 km/h; 18 mph)
- Complement: 120
- Armament: 3 × single Bofors M24 120 mm (4.7 in) guns; 2 × single 40 mm (1.6 in) AA guns; 2 × triple 533 mm (21 in) torpedo tubes

The Ehrensköld class was the first "modern" class of destroyer built by the Swedish Navy after the First World War. It introduced several new features, mainly heavy armament in three 12 cm guns and the new 53 cm torpedo. The class included two vessels, Ehrensköld and Nordenskjöld, which were both launched in 1926 and entered service in 1927. They patrolled the Baltic Sea until 1963, after which they became target vessels. Nordenskjöld was scrapped in 1964 and Ehrensköld in 1974.

== Construction and design ==
In the early 1920s, the Royal Swedish Navy operated 10 destroyers and 29 first-class torpedo boats. The destroyers, which dated between 1902 and 1917, were of similar design, displacing 450–500 long tons (460–510 t) and armed with 75 mm (3 in) guns and 45.7 cm (18 in) torpedo tubes.

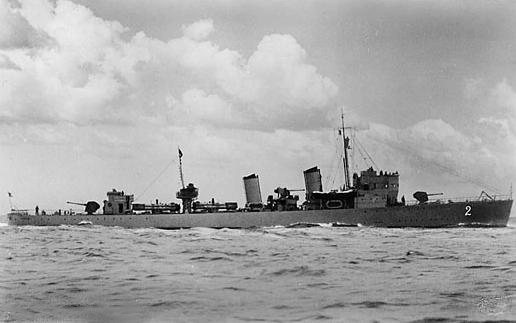
Nordenskjöld

In 1924, two destroyers of more modern design were laid down, Ehrensköld and Nordenskjöld. The main gun armament was three 120 mm (4.7 in) guns built by Bofors in single mounts on the ships' centreline, with one gun forward, one aft and one between the ships' two funnels, from which it had a restricted arc of fire. Anti-aircraft armament consisted of two Vickers 40 mm automatic anti-aircraft guns. (Note: These were later replaced by more modern Bofors 40 mm guns.) Torpedo armament consisted of two triple mounts for 53 cm (21 in) torpedoes, while the ships were also fitted for minelaying, being able to carry 20 mines. Three Penhoët boilers fed two de Laval geared steam turbines, generating 34,000 shaft horsepower (25,000 kW) which drove the ships to a speed of 36 knots (67 km/h; 41 mph).

The two ships were launched in 1926 and commissioned in 1927.

== Operational history ==
The two destroyers patrolled in the Baltic Sea to defend Sweden's neutrality during the Second World War, when the ships' 40 mm Vickers anti-aircraft guns were replaced by four Bofors 25 mm cannons in two twin mountings.

In 1950–51, the two destroyers were repurposed as anti-submarine frigates. The aft two 120 mm (4.7 in) guns and the torpedo tubes were removed to allow the fitting of an improved anti-aircraft and anti-submarine armament and sensors. As rebuilt, armament was one 120 mm gun, four 40 mm Bofors guns and a single 20 mm cannon. Displacement rose to 1,080 long tons (1,100 t) standard and 1,250 long tons (1,270 t) full load, and speed fell to 30 knots (56 km/h; 35 mph).

They remained in use until 1963, after which they were used as target vessels. Nordenskjöld was scrapped in 1964 and Ehrensköld in 1974.

== Ships in the class ==
| Ship | Builder | Laid down | Launched | Commissioned | Fate |
|---|---|---|---|---|---|
| Ehrensköld (Note: Originally named Nils Ehrensköld) | Kockums, Malmö | 1924 | 25 September 1926 | December 1927 | Stricken 1 April 1963, Scrapped 1974 |
| Nordenskjöld (Note: Originally O.H. Nordenskjöld) | Götaverken, Gothenburg | 1924 | 9 June 1926 | September 1927 | Stricken 1 April 1963, Scrapped 1964 |

== Notes and references ==
=== References ===
- Blackman, Raymond V. B. (1960). Jane's Fighting Ships 1960–61. London: Sampson Low, Marston & Co. Ltd.
- Campbell, John (1985). Naval Weapons of World War II. Annapolis, Maryland: Naval Institute Press. ISBN 0-87021-459-4.
- Parkes, Oscar (1973) [1931]. Jane's Fighting Ships 1931. London: David & Charles (Publishers). ISBN 0-7153-5849-9.
- Westerlund, Karl-Erik (1985). "Sweden". In Gray, Randal (ed.). Conway's All the World's Fighting Ships 1906–1921. London: Conway Maritime Press. pp. 355–363. ISBN 978-0-85177-245-5.
- Westerlund, Karl-Eric (1980). "Sweden". In Chesneau, Roger (ed.). Conway's All the World's Fighting Ships 1922–1946. New York: Mayflower Books. pp. 368–377. ISBN 0-8317-0303-2.
- Whitley, M. J. (2000). Destroyers of World War Two: An International Encyclopedia. London: Cassell & Co. ISBN 1-85409-521-8.
