= Eriksberg =

Eriksberg can refer to:

- Eriksberg, Gothenburg in Gothenburg, Sweden
  - Eriksbergs Mekaniska Verkstad, a shipbuilding company existing in Gothenburg from 1850 to 1979
