= USS Nokomis (YT-142) =

Tugboat of the United States Navy

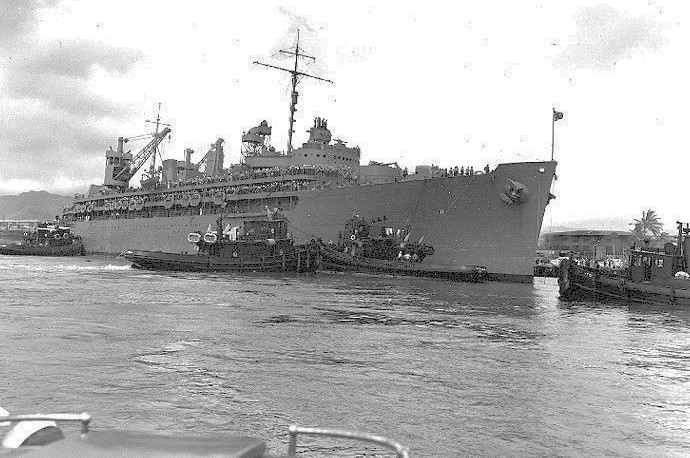
- USS Nokomis, one of the tugs assisting USS Fulton (AS-11) to enter Pearl Harbor after the Battle of Midway.

History

United States
- Name: USS Nokomis
- Namesake: Grandmother and nurse of Hiawatha
- Builder: Puget Sound Navy Yard, Washington
- Laid down: date unknown
- Launched: 29 November 1939
- Completed: March 1940
- Commissioned: March 1940
- Decommissioned: c. 1973
- Reclassified: YTB-142 in May 1944 and YTM-142 in February 1962
- Stricken: May 1973
- Home port: Pearl Harbor, Hawaii
- Honors and awards: one battle star for World War II service
- Fate: Sold, 1 September 1974; scrapped 2010

General characteristics
- Class & type: Woban-class
- Type: District Harbor Tug
- Displacement: 218 tons
- Length: 100 ft 10 in (30.73 m)
- Beam: 25 ft (7.6 m)
- Draft: 9 ft 7 in (2.92 m)
- Propulsion: 1000hp diesel-electric, two Enterprise engines
- Speed: 12 knots
- Complement: 8 crew members
- Armament: not known

USS Nokomis (YT-142/YTB-142/YTM-142) was a Woban-class harbor tug built in Bremerton, Wash, and assigned to Pearl Harbor, Hawaii, in 1940. Nokomis was present during the Japanese attack on Pearl Harbor, 7 December 1941.

== Built in Bremerton, Washington ==
Nokomis (YT–142), a diesel electric tug, was built at the Puget Sound Naval Shipyard, Bremerton, Washington; launched 29 November 1939; completed in March 1940; and allocated to the 14th Naval District for duty.

== World War II service ==
Upon her arrival at Pearl Harbor, Nokomis assumed the duty of providing towing and berthing services, and was available for waterfront fire protection and inner harbor security.

She was the first vessel on scene at the USS Arizona, and was called off by the officers on deck because of the imminent explosion of the battery below deck. It then left and helped beach the USS Nevada, with Hoga (YT-146), and YT-153. The beaching of the Nevada saved Pearl Harbor's mouth from being blocked. After that the USS Nokomis fought fires and dewatered the battleship USS California, for 3 days. This effort made the California salvageable, to be recommissioned again later in the war. Nokomis was also the last vessel to move the surviving YC-699 barge prior to the Japanese attack on Pearl Harbor.

== Post-war service ==
Reclassified YTB–142, in 1944, she remained active as a service craft based at Pearl Harbor until she was decommissioned in May 1973.

== Final decommissioning ==
Nokomis was decommissioned and was stricken from the Naval Vessel Register in May 1973 and sold by the Defense Reutilization and Marketing Service to Crowley Maritime Corporation in September 1974. NAVSEA states the date of removal was 18 April 1975.

She was renamed Sea Serpent and served many years in the San Francisco Bay as a tug and fire boat. In 1989, after the Loma Prieta earthquake in the SF Bay area, Nokomis and Hoga (which had been serving the City of Oakland as a fireboat) fought fires alongside each other again.

== Fate ==
According to the Historic Tugboat Education and Restoration Society, the Nokomis was purchased in April 1975 by Crowley Maritime Corporation, and her name was changed to Sea Serpent. She operated in the San Francisco Bay as a commercial tugboat to assist docking vessels. Crowley Maritime terminated their operations in the San Francisco area in the early 1990s and the Nokomis was reflagged Panamanian and abandoned along with many other tug boats, to decay and rust.

She was rediscovered in mid 2002, in the mudflats of Hunters Point, San Francisco, by Tugboat Master Melissa Parker. She was purchased at an auction for $50 for the Historic Tugboat Education and Restoration Society (HTERS) and initially was tied up at Pier 80 in San Francisco.

The 501(c)3 educational non-profit worked on historical research, practical engineering educational programs for underprivileged youth in the Bay Area, and cooperative programs between historical ship organizations in the SF Bay, and beyond. HTERS acquired an operational sister tug, USS Wenonah, intending that Wenonah be used as a floating classroom to solicit interest in HTERS in order to help raise funds to restore Nokomis. After falling behind on dock rental fees, the two tugs were moved to Treasure Island, but dock rental and insurance fees continued to pile up, eventually costing the Historic Tugboat Education and Restoration Society both vessels.

=== Sinking of the Wenonah ===
While tied up at Treasure Island, Wenonah sank in August 2009 and spilled oil into San Francisco Bay. The Coast Guard contracted Global Diving to recover the vessel to prevent further leaks, and Global Diving turned to the American Bridge/Fluor Joint Venture for use of the Left Coast Lifter sheerleg crane to recover the vessel. Wenonah was turned over to the Coast Guard for disposal, and Bay Ship & Yacht in Alameda assumed the lease of Pier 1 in Treasure Island, which included taking possession of Wenonah and Nokomis. Both vessels were scrapped in 2010 in Alameda.

Wenonah was an identical sister to Hoga. She would have been a great resource of parts to restore her. Nokomis was the oldest surviving naval vessel from the attack on Pearl Harbor. The YC-699 barge on the SF Bay and the YT-153 tug on the east coast, with Hoga, are now the last remaining Naval Pearl Harbor surviving vessels.
