= USS Wenonah =

USS Wenonah is a name used more than once by the U.S. Navy:

- USS Wenonah (SP-165), a 290 GRT patrol vessel, was built in 1915 at Neponset, Massachusetts.
- USS Wenonah (YT-148), a harbor tugboat constructed during the winter of 1940 and 1941 at Morris Heights, New York.
