= Eriksbergs Mekaniska Verkstad =

Swedish shipbuilding company

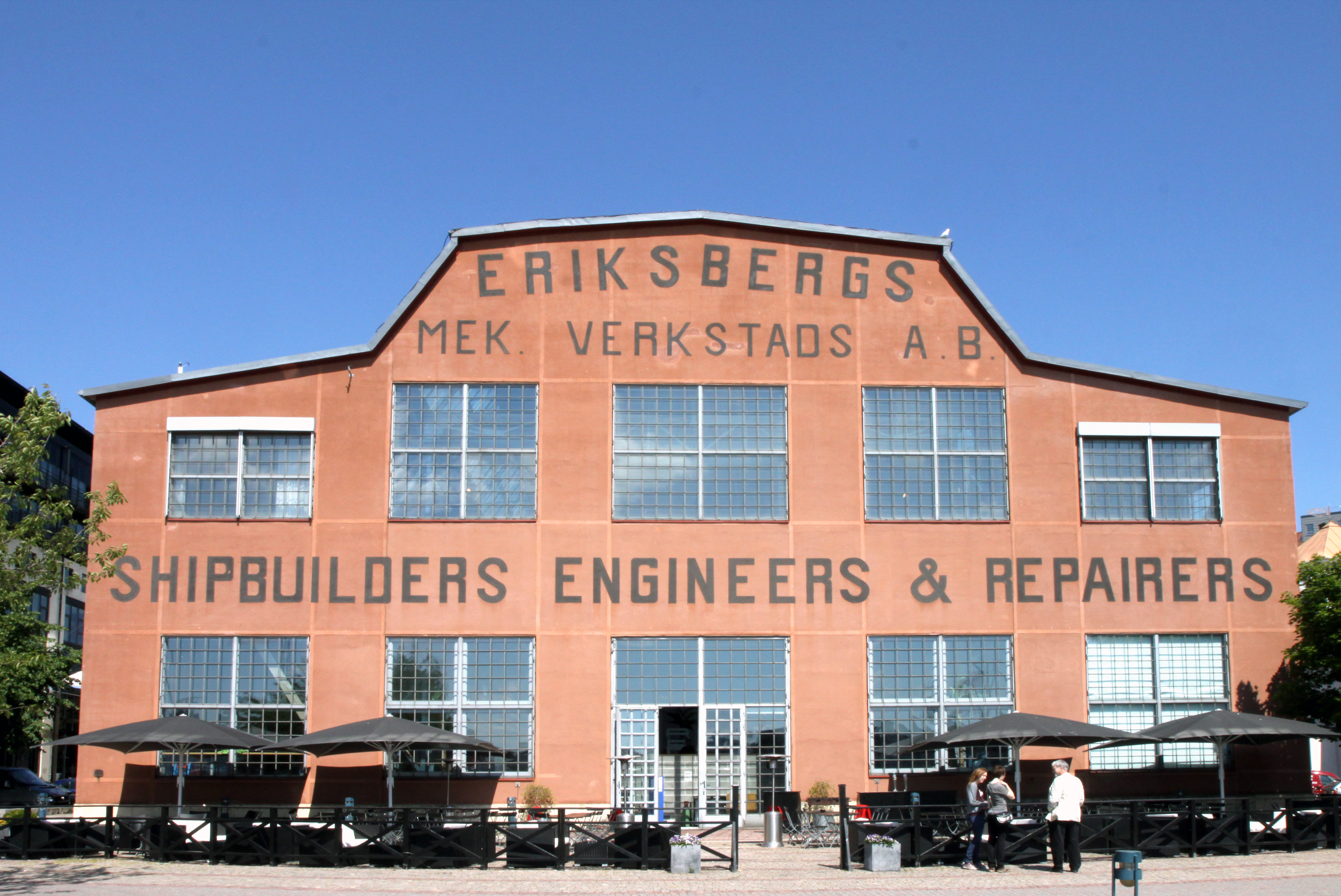
Eriksbergshallen, one of the workshop halls

Eriksbergs Mekaniska Verkstads AB was a Swedish shipbuilding company based in Gothenburg. It was founded in 1850 by Christian Barchman under the name Ericsbergs metall och tackjerns-gjuteri. It delivered its last ship in 1979.

== History ==
=== Introduction ===
Founded in 1850 by Christian Barchman, the company originally worked with galvanization. The first shipyard wharf was opened in 1871, and two years later they delivered their first ship. In 1876 the company was transformed into a joint-stock company, and so the name was changed to Eriksbergs Mekaniska Werkstads AB. In the beginning of the 1890s, the shipyard was still the smallest of the three wharfs that existed in Gothenburg. Production was based on passenger ships, steam cutters and towboats for Denmark, Norway and Finland, and ferries for Stockholm's public transportation. In 1915 Eriksberg underwent massive developments to accommodate production of larger ships after a major takeover of the corporation's stocks by Dan Broström.

=== Eriksberg's developments up to the 1960s ===
Eriksberg underwent similar developments as the other Swedish major shipbuilding companies; Kockums Mekaniska Verkstads AB, AB Götaverken and AB Lindholmens Varv - partly through World War I and the post-war period until 1940; a successive expansion triggered by a shipping boom and in particular by Norwegian and Swedish shipowner's need of new and bigger ships. In this regard, Eriksberg had an advantage through the direct-ownership by the Broström family (later through their listed mother company Ångfartygsaktiebolaget Tirfing). With a relatively modest share capital (6.5 million SEK) Eriksberg was able to make net profits of 40-50 million SEK every year during the 1940s. The cause for this was an unprecedented profitability during the second world war, repairing war-damaged tonnage and strong demand for replacement tonnage for Swedish and Norwegian shipping companies. This was enhanced by the favourable "wartime windfall taxes" introduced during the war. Most of these extraordinary profits were reinvested within shipping and industrial investments of the Broström Group, and this contributed to Broström's becoming the country's richest group in the beginning of the 1960s.

In the beginning of the 1950s, Eriksberg obtained the rights to manufacture Burmeister & Wains diesel motors, unlike Götaverken who chose to manufacture their own original designs. This involved a certain lead for the production of large tankers, and the size records of ships were being constantly broken. Many thought that the weight limit, 40,000 tonnes deadweight, was reached.

Eriksberg's financial position was solid, like the other competitors in Sweden. Both Kockums and Götaverken were listed and were independent companies, while Eriksberg and Lindholmen were owned by shipping companies. During the 1950s and the 1960s, Eriksberg was the most profitable shipyard in the country, and to work at 'Torpet' (the name used by the public) was a 'status job' in Gothenburg.

=== The financial crisis ===
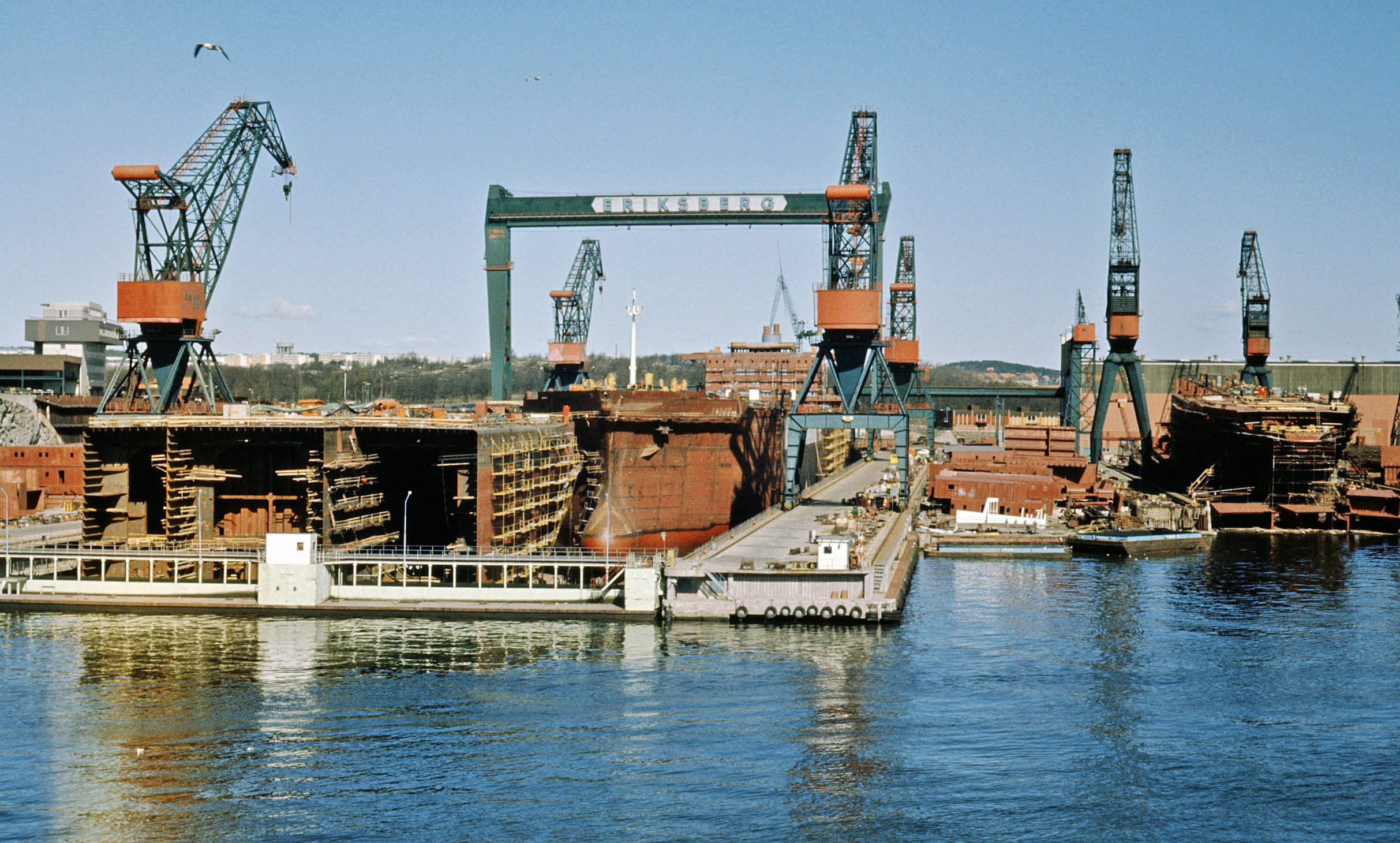
Eriksbergs shipyard during busy times in 1973

The last profitable decade was the 1960s, before competition from the Japanese shipbuilding industry became too fierce. When Norwegian shipping companies discontinued refinancing their vessel purchases in the United States capital market (the Interest Equalization Tax), requirements were put on Swedish wharfs to hand out credits with subsidized interests and conditions, like the Japanese industry. Eriksberg succeeded however, unlike its competitors Götaverken and Kockums, to retain high solvency and go through the last years of the 1960s relatively unhurt. Both Kockums and Götaverken, being public companies, were insolvent and were saved, through a combination of private and state intervention. In the case of Götaverken, the Salén Group of Stockholm, assumed ownership for a limited time with the option to regaining its investment from the State.

In the beginning of the 1970s, it became clear to the company's management that there was only a respite of a few years before the economic resources were exhausted. The rise of wages and salaries, enforced by the trade unions in the beginning of the 1970s, increased the company's cost by around 25% in the span of only a few years. The Swedish krona with recurring devaluations raised import prices for the wharf. When the Bretton Woods system was abandoned in 1973 and the US dollar became "floating", it was obvious that the Swedish shipbuilding industry was at the brink of ruin.

For Eriksberg, the 1970s started nevertheless in positive territory. They acquired Lindholmens Mekaniska Verkstad and built the Portuguese wharfs Lisnave and later Setenave, that among other things, delivered the bows for the company's supertankers (VLCC, ULCC). In 1973 Eriksberg sold their repair business to Götaverken to become pure new building shipyard.

In 1974 the company's management issued an anticipated warning about the serious state of the company, and the Managing Director Bengt Eneroth resigned after being with the company for 33 years. He had consciously held back new investments in buildings and equipment but the company was still hit. The unfavorable refinancing in foreign currencies created huge losses, as for the other wharfs, by the major problem were the customers, the shipping companies, canceling contracts and amortizations.

The situation, however, was not handled well by the new company management from AB Tirfing, the owners, and they were eventually forced to sell Eriksberg for a symbolic 1000 krona and sign two very expensive ship building contracts with the new owners, now the soon defunct Götaverken Group. In the long run, this meant a coup de grace for Broströmkoncernen and Tirfing, which were listed on the Stockholm stock exchange. This also meant the end of the once fortunate and rich Broström Group

The obstinate attitude of the trade-unions and the socialist government to not lose a single job of the shipbuilders, proved to be a ticking bomb that in the end led to the death of the shipbuilding industry in Sweden. But this would take another 10 years.

The government's irresponsible economic policies, driven by the Social Democratic governments, in tandem with the metalworkers union, alongside the devaluations of the Swedish Krona that made imports expensive, unreasonable wage increases eaten up by progressive taxes and an inconsistent currency regulation, which made it impossible to match the Krona with the credit commitments in US dollar, brought the shipbuilding industry to an end. The total cost for the State of shutting down this industry has been estimated to 39 billion Kronor ( 1986).

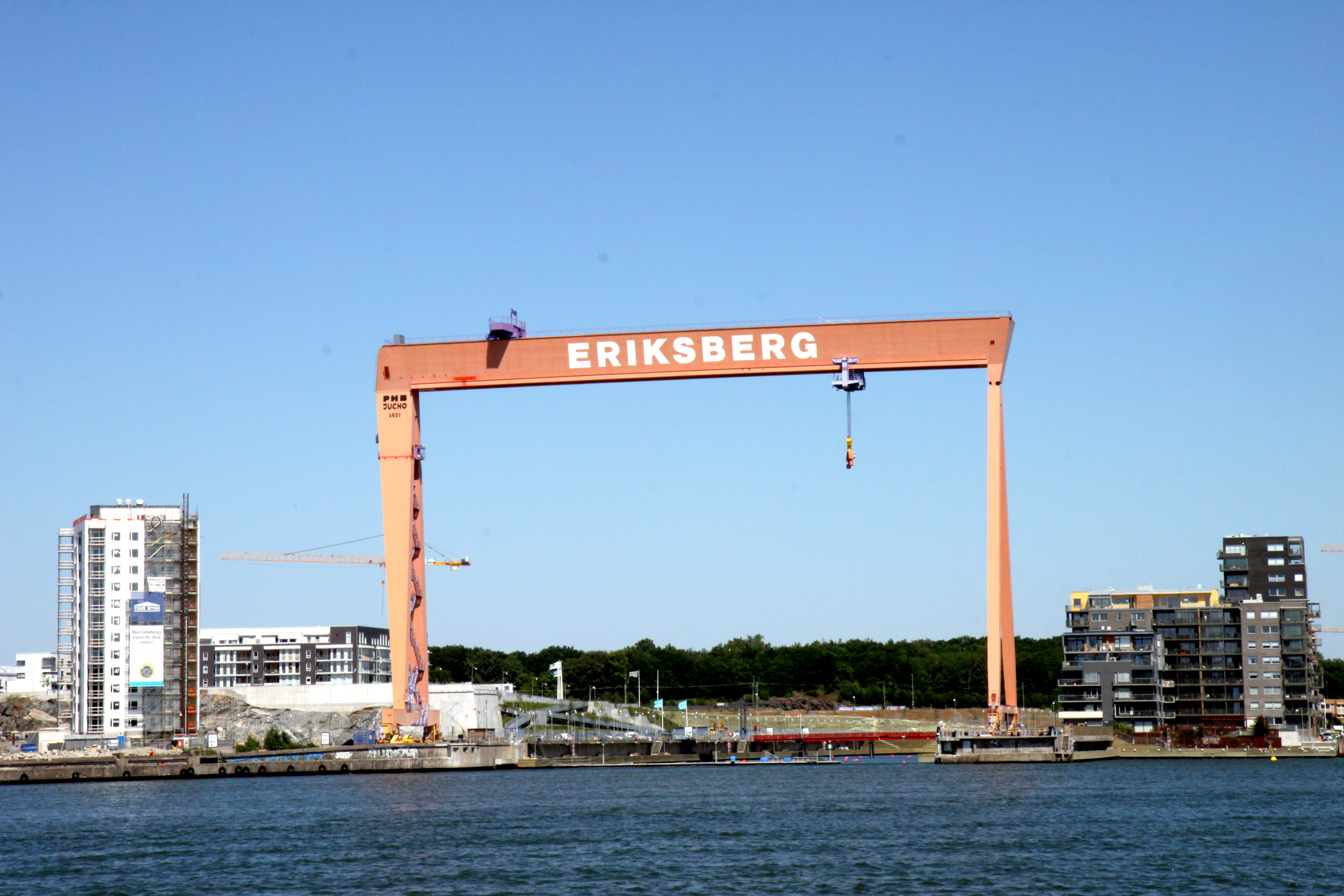
The Eriksberg Crane, built in Trollhättan and Cologne in 1968-9.

=== Eriksberg is taken over and is closed down ===
At this point, Eriksberg Mekaniska Verkstad had 6000 employees. Despite the example of Eriksberg, it was not taken seriously and so investments at Götaverken and Uddevallavarvet was not questioned. Billions were lost because of over optimistic wharf directors. Eriksberg became a sister company of Götaverken, before both became part of Svenska Varv, which was run by the government, in 1978. During 1978-79 all activities were successfully terminated at Eriksberg, and on 15 June 1979 the shipyards last vessel, a product tanker M/T Atland was delivered to Broströms, that was already on the brink of bankruptcy. Just about a year before the shut down Erikbergs Mekaniska Verkstad had delivered the ULCC:s 'Nai Superba' and 'Nai Genova' at about 460 000 dwt each. The greatest ships ever built in Gothenburg as well as they were among the last. The Nai-ships were demolished in year 2000-2001.

Today, all that remains of EMV is the 84m high, bright orange Eriksberg Crane and two workshop halls; the engine workshop 'Blå Hallen', today hosting a hotel and conference facility, and the former workshop 'Eriksbergshallen' with the text 'Eriksbergs Mek. Verkstads AB Shipbuilders Engineers & Repairers' still painted on the facade. Along the former equipping quays are now blocks of fancy condos and boutiques.
