= Eriksberg Crane =

Crane in Gothenburg

Coordinates: 57.6976°N 11.9090°E

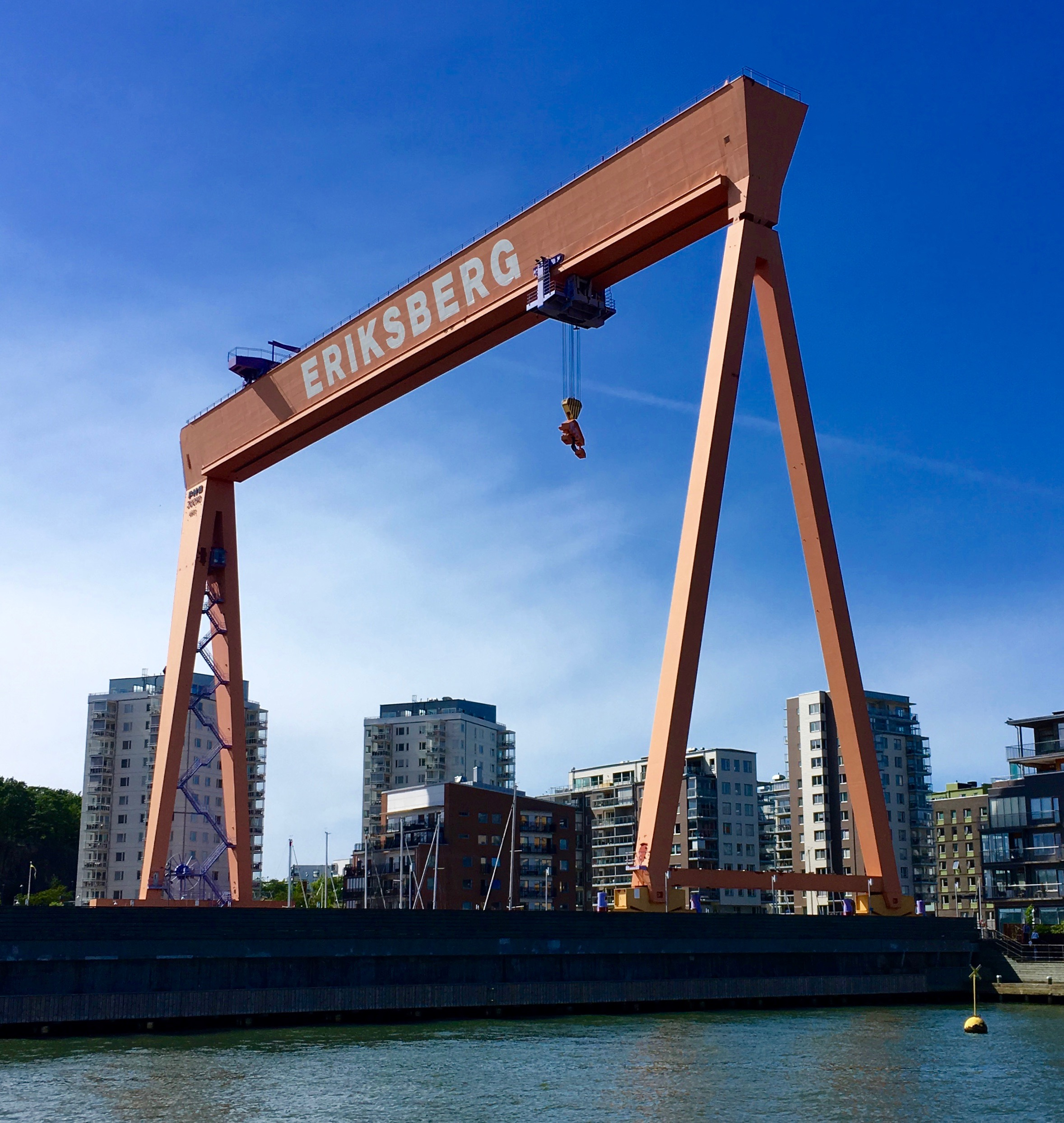
The Eriksberg Crane.

The Eriksberg Crane (Swedish: Eriksbergskranen) is a full gantry crane in the Eriksberg district of Gothenburg, part of the former Eriksberg shipyard. It is a listed building, and is considered to be one of the city's main landmarks and an important relic of its industrial and maritime heritage.

The company Eriksbergs Mekaniska Verkstad was founded in the Eriksberg district of Gothenburg in 1876, and initially specialised in manufacturing iron and steel parts, but later switched its focus to shipbuilding and built up a sizeable shipyard on the north bank of the Göta Älv, on the island of Hisingen.

The main structure of the crane was fashioned in eight sections by NOHAB in Trollhättan in 1968, and was transported by barge down the Göta Älv to Gothenburg. The crane was assembled and erected at one of the dry docks in the Eriksberg shipyard in 1969. The lifting gear was manufactured by Pohlig-Heckel-Bleichert (PHB) in Cologne.

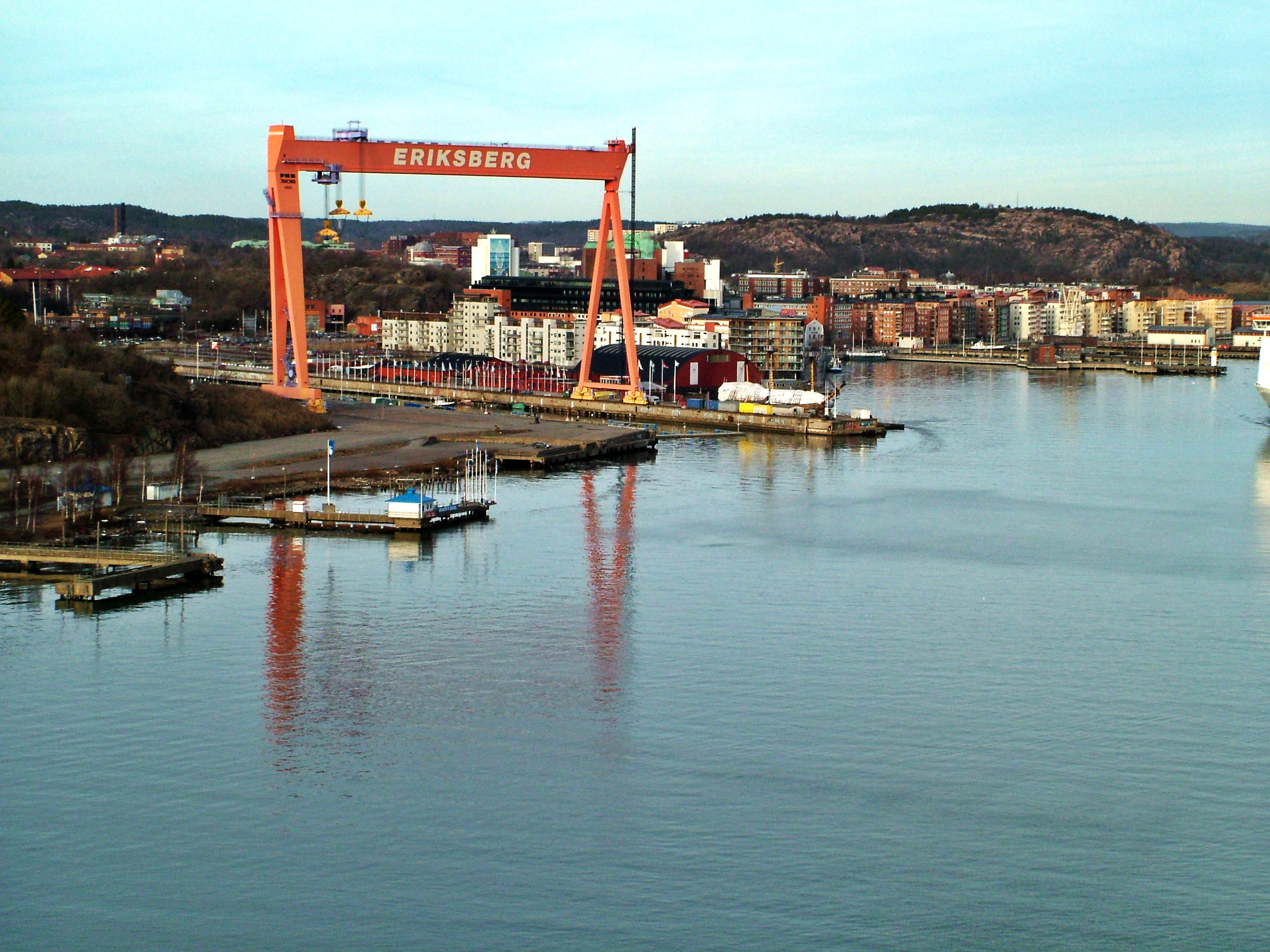
The Eriksberg Crane from the river.

However, in the event the new gantry crane only saw a decade of use. Eriksbergs Mekaniska Verkstad was bought out by the Swedish state in 1975, becoming part of the nationalised Svenska Varv, and production at the Gothenburg shipyard was wound down in 1978–1979, with the yard's final vessel, the M/T Atland, being delivered on 15 June 1979.

From 1993 the crane has been used for bungee jumping, and at 84 metres in height, it is Sweden's highest bungee-jumping location.

It was recognised as a listed building in 2012.

Although no longer operational, the Eriksberg Crane is the only remaining full gantry crane in Sweden. There were once similar cranes at shipyards in Uddevalla and Malmö, but the former was scrapped in 1986 and the latter (the so-called Kockums Crane) was sold to Hyundai Heavy Industries in 2002, for the nominal sum of $1 (USD), and transported to Ulsan in South Korea.

== See also ==
- Eriksberg
- Eriksbergs Mekaniska Verkstad
- Kockums Crane
