= Left coast (disambiguation) =

Left coast is a colloquial expression for the politics and culture of the West Coast of the United States. It may also refer to:

- "Left Coast", a weekly cartoon by Ted Rall
- "Left Coast", part of the city of Mosul, Iraq, on the east bank of the Tigris river
- Left Coast Crime, an annual mystery fiction convention
- Left Coast Lifter, a barge used to rebuild the San Francisco–Oakland Bay Bridge
- Left Coast Press, a scholarly publisher now part of Routledge
