= Kockums Crane =

Gantry crane

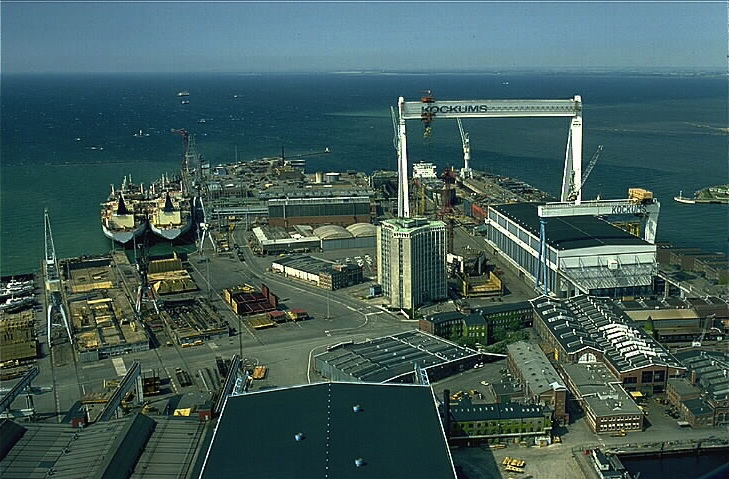
The Kockums Crane in around the mid-1970s

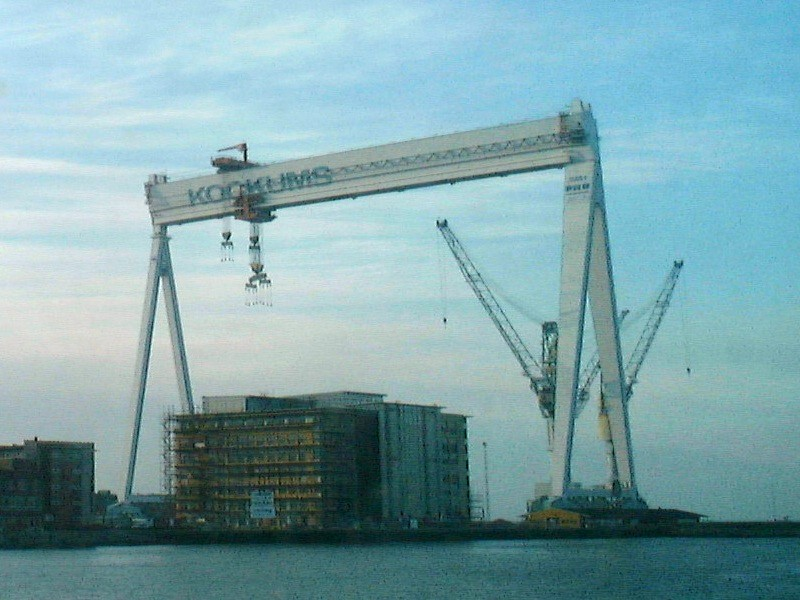
The crane in February 2000

The Kockums Crane (Swedish: Kockumskranen) is a 140-metre (459 ft) high gantry crane in the Hyundai Heavy Industries shipyard in Ulsan, South Korea. It was originally used at the Kockums shipyard in Malmö, Sweden.

== History ==
It was built in 1973–74 and can lift 1,500 tonnes (1,476 long tons; 1,653 short tons). The gauge of crane's rails is 174 metres (571 ft) and the rail length 710 metres (2,329 ft). The crane was used to build about 75 ships. Its last use in Malmö was in mid-1997, when it lifted the foundations of the high pillars of the Öresund Bridge.

The crane was first sold in the early 1990s to the Danish company Burmeister & Wain but the company went bankrupt before the crane could be moved.

The crane was a landmark of Malmö from its time of construction until its dismantling in the summer of 2002, when it was shipped to Ulsan, after being sold to Hyundai Heavy Industries for $1. The Koreans have dubbed the crane 말뫼의 눈물 (Tears of Malmö), because the residents of Malmö reportedly wept when they saw their crane being towed away.

== Locations ==
Former location: 55.6144615°N 12.9896602°E ("Kockums Crane")
Today's location: 35.4772042°N 129.4049405°E ("Tears of Malmö")

At Ulsan the crane is located on a tongue of land within the Bangeo-dong quarter right at the mouth of the Taehwa River. Additionally a second gantry crane with a lifting capacity of 1,600 tonnes (1,575 long tons; 1,764 short tons) was subsequently erected nearby. The two cranes share a common working area. "Tears of Malmö" is the more southern of the two.

== See also ==
- Big Blue
- Breakwater Crane Railway
- Eriksberg Crane
- Finnieston Crane
- Fairbairn steam crane
- Left Coast Lifter
- Mastekranen
- Samson & Goliath
- Taisun
- Titan Clydebank
