= Tappan Zee Bridge (2017–present) =

Bridge across the Hudson River in New York

Tappan Zee Bridge (Governor Mario M. Cuomo Bridge)
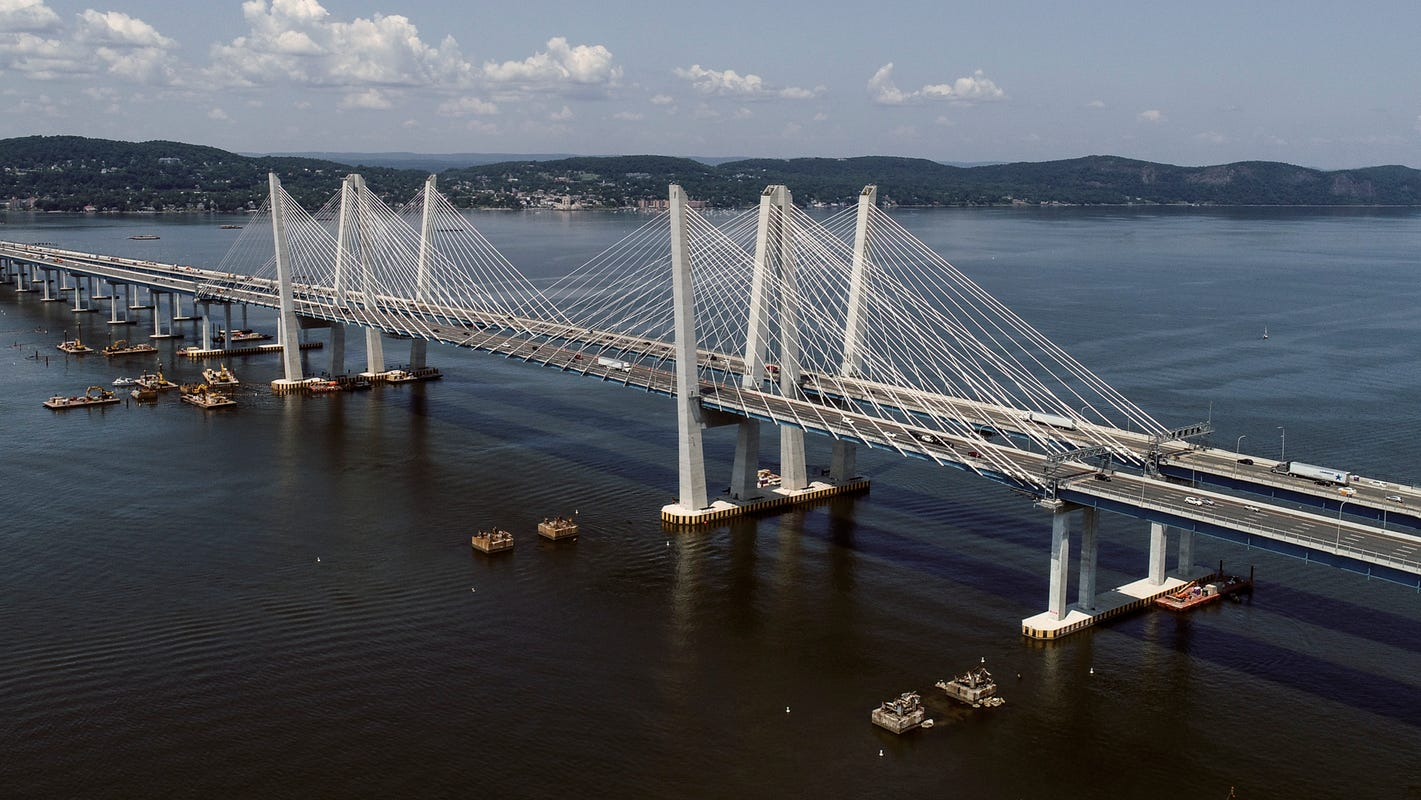
- The bridge in 2020
- Coordinates: 41°04′17″N 73°53′28″W
- Carries: I-87 Toll / I-287 Toll / New York Thruway; 8 automobile lanes, 2 bus lanes, 2 bicycle/pedestrian lanes
- Crosses: Hudson River
- Locale: Connecting South Nyack (Rockland County) and Tarrytown (Westchester County)
- Official name: Governor Mario M. Cuomo Bridge
- Other name(s): New Tappan Zee Bridge; New NY Bridge
- Maintained by: New York State Thruway Authority

Characteristics
- Design: Twin span cable-stayed bridge
- Total length: 16,368 ft (4,989.0 m; 3.1 mi; 5.0 km)
- Width: 183 ft (56 m), total of both decks: 87 ft (27 m) and 96 ft (29 m)
- Height: 419 ft (128 m)
- Longest span: 1,200 ft (370 m)
- Clearance above: unlimited
- Clearance below: 139 ft (42 m)

History
- Construction start: 2013
- Construction cost: $3.9 billion (2013 project budget)
- Opened: August 26, 2017 (westbound/northbound span); September 11, 2018 (eastbound/southbound span)
- Replaces: Tappan Zee Bridge (1955–2017)

Statistics
- Toll: Cars $12.69 Tolls-by-Mail; $12.69 non-NY E-ZPass; $7.25 NY E-ZPass (eastbound/southbound only); Larger vehicles pay variable toll based on vehicle class and time of day (cashless toll)

Location
- Interactive map of Tappan Zee Bridge (Governor Mario M. Cuomo Bridge)

The Tappan Zee Bridge (English pronunciation: /ˌtæpən ˈziː/), officially named Governor Mario M. Cuomo Bridge after the former New York governor, is a twin cable-stayed bridge spanning the Tappan Zee section of the Hudson River between Tarrytown and Nyack in the U.S. state of New York. It was built to replace the original Tappan Zee Bridge, which opened in 1955 and was located just to the south. The bridge's north span carries the northbound and westbound automobile traffic of the New York State Thruway, Interstate 87 (I-87) and I-287; it also carries a shared use path for bicycles and pedestrians. The south span carries southbound and eastbound automobile traffic.

Although not as old as other bridges such as the George Washington, the original Tappan Zee was built in the midst of a material shortage during the Korean War and was thus only designed to last for approximately half a century. The process to replace the bridge kicked off in 2012, with construction on the new spans beginning by contractor Tappan Zee Constructors in 2013. The Left Coast Lifter, one of the largest cranes in the world, was instrumental in the bridge's construction. The north span officially opened to westbound traffic on August 26, 2017, and eastbound traffic temporarily began using the north span on October 6, 2017. Contractors then began demolishing the old bridge. An opening ceremony for the south span was held on September 7, 2018, and traffic started using the new span three days later.

The bridge's official name, which does not include the words "Tappan Zee" like its predecessor, has been controversial since its announcement. A petition and several legislative bills have sought to officially rename the bridge to the Tappan Zee Bridge or similar names.

== History ==
The Tappan Zee river crossing was named by 17th century Dutch settlers after the Tappan people, a tribe of Lenape native to the area, and zee the Dutch word for sea. The Tappan Zee Bridge is the only crossing of the Hudson between Westchester and Rockland counties. The original Tappan Zee Bridge was a cantilever bridge built from 1952 to 1955. The bridge was 3 miles (4.8 km) long and spanned the Hudson at its second-widest point. It was the longest bridge in New York State, at a length of 16,013 feet (4,881 m) including approaches. Built immediately after the Korean War, the bridge had a low construction budget of only $81 million and a designed life-span of only 50 years. During its first decade, the bridge carried fewer than 40,000 vehicles per day.

=== Planning ===
By the start of the 21st century, the old Tappan Zee Bridge was "decaying" and "overburdened". The deteriorating structure bore an average of 140,000 vehicles per day, substantially more traffic than its designed capacity. The collapse of Minnesota's I-35W Mississippi River bridge in 2007 raised worries about the Tappan Zee Bridge's structural integrity. These concerns, together with traffic overcapacity and increased maintenance costs, escalated the serious discussions already ongoing about replacing the Tappan Zee with a tunnel or a new bridge. Six options were identified and submitted for project study and environmental review.

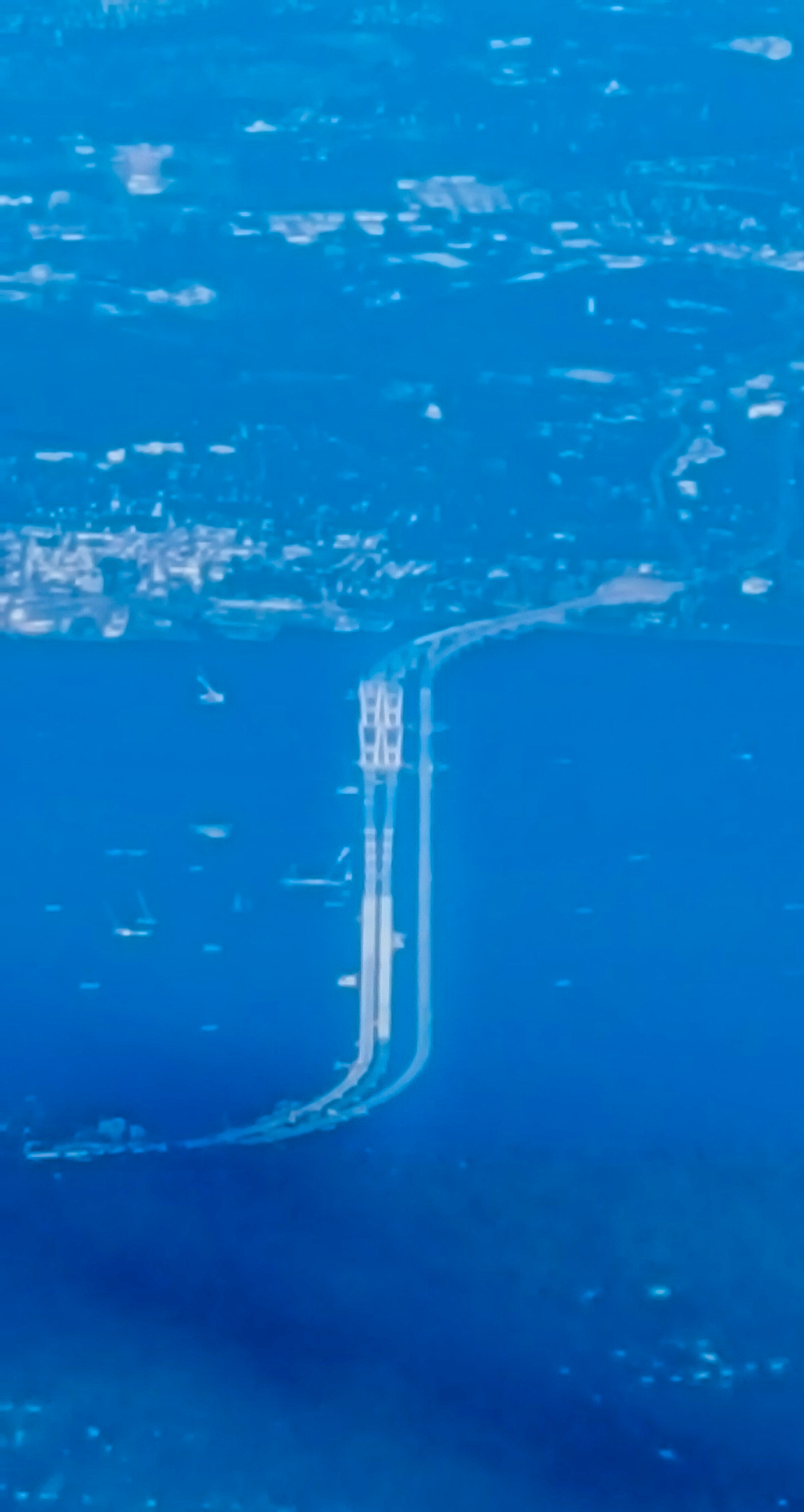
Aerial view of the new Tappan Zee Bridge being constructed next to the existing Tappan Zee Bridge (August 2016)

The Federal Highway Administration issued a report in October 2011 designating the Tappan Zee's replacement to be a dual-span twin bridge. The new bridge was to be built a few yards to the north of the existing bridge, connecting to the existing highway approaches of the New York State Thruway (I-87/I-287) on both river banks. The New York State Thruway Authority (NYSTA) requested design proposals from four companies in 2012 and eventually received three project proposals. The authority awarded a $3.142 billion contract to Tappan Zee Constructors (TZC), whose proposal was not only the least expensive but also promised the shortest construction timeline and included plans to minimize environmental impact.

Originally, some motorists thought that bridge tolls could more than double (to $12–$15 for automobiles, eastbound only), rising to those of New York City's Hudson River crossings. However, the state passed legislation freezing the toll on the bridge at $5 through 2020 in its 2016 legislative session.

The new Tappan Zee Bridge was proposed to include four vehicle lanes on each span, for a total of eight lanes, as well as a shared-use bicycle and pedestrian path. Like its predecessor, the new Tappan Zee Bridge is to be administered by the NYSTA. The authority is the project co-sponsor, along with the state Department of Transportation.

=== Construction ===
The New York Metropolitan Transportation Council added the Tappan Zee Bridge to its list of projects eligible for federal funds in August 2012. The United States Department of Transportation approved the plan on September 25, 2012. The approval process took fewer than 10 months as opposed to the traditional multi-year process as a result of being placed on a "fast track" for approval by the Obama administration. On December 17, 2012, New York state officials dropped their proposal for a 45 percent increase on the State Thruway toll for trucks, while advancing a $3.14 billion project to replace the bridge. The project was funded through a public-private partnership.

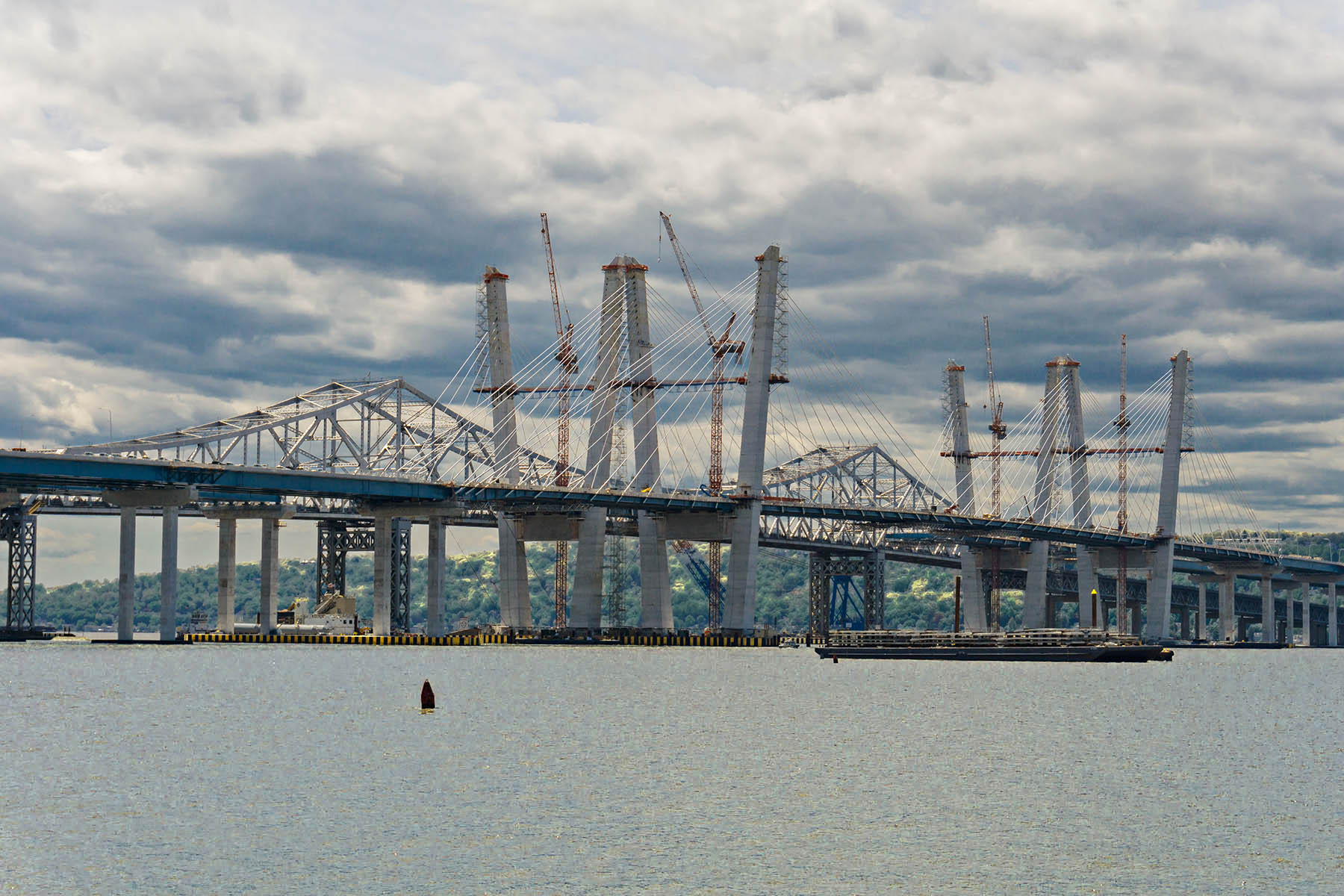
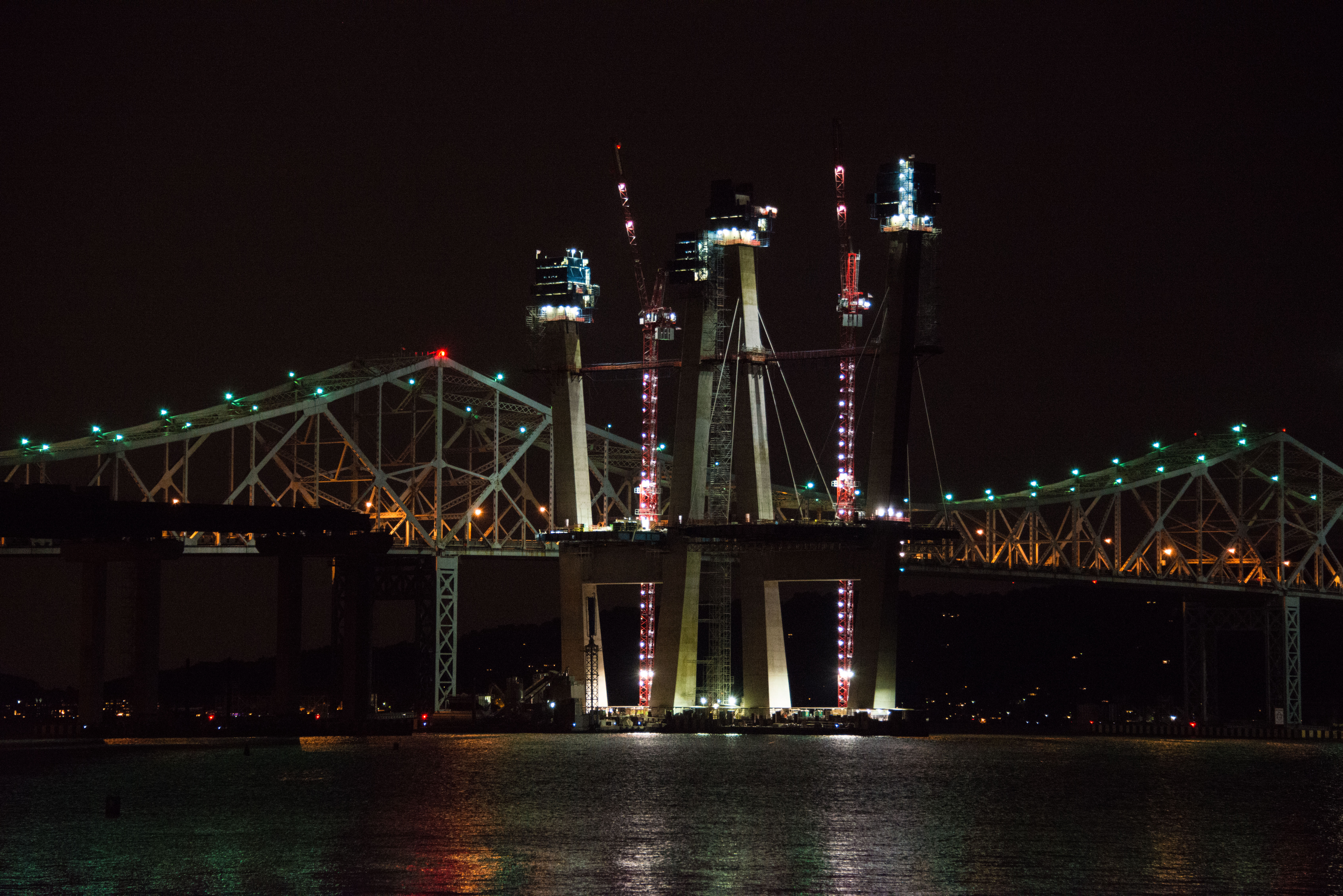
Under construction, day view (left, May 2017) and night view (right, September 2016)

Construction began as scheduled in October 2013, with completion targeted for 2017. TZC, the contractor, was composed of several design, engineering, and construction firms including Fluor Corporation, American Bridge Company, Granite Construction Northeast and Traylor Bros. The Left Coast Lifter was used to install groups of pre-assembled girders one full span at a time. The contractors were obliged to finish the bridge by 2018, after which the state would fine the contractors around $100,000 per day.

By the end of 2013, General Electric had completed four seasons of dredging to remove contaminants from the river bottom. Approximately 70 percent of the sediments targeted for dredging were removed (totaling more than 1,900,000 cubic yards (1,500,000 m^{3}) of sediment).

On July 19, 2016, a crane used for the construction of the bridge collapsed onto the existing older bridge. Five people were injured, including three drivers and two bridge workers; no one was killed or critically injured.

=== Completion ===
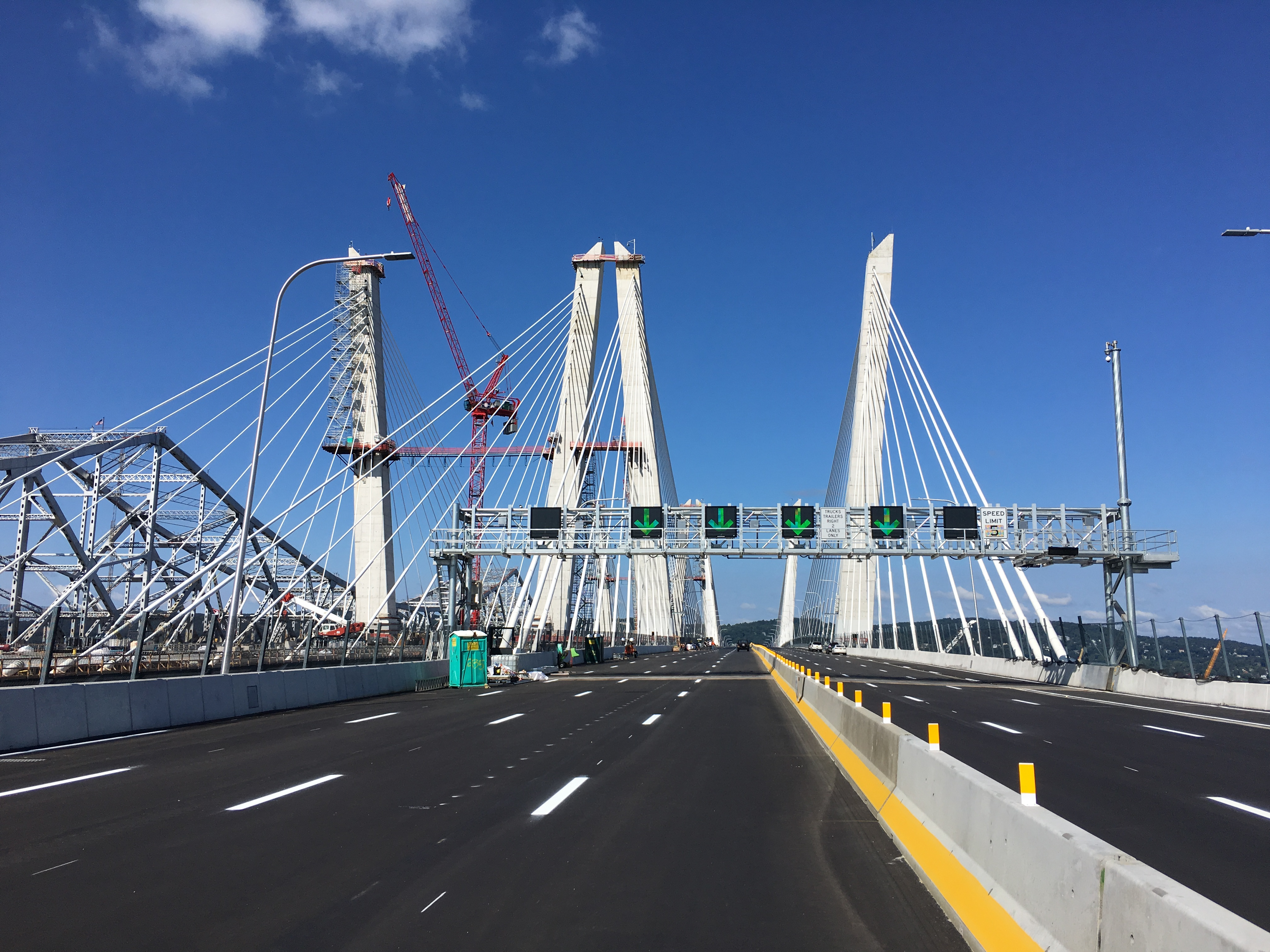
Deck of the new Tappan Zee Bridge, one week before its official opening

Video showing the detonation of explosives to demolish the old span's eastern half

The project timeline originally indicated that the old bridge would be closed in 2016 and that the demolition of the old bridge would begin in February 2017. The new northbound/westbound span opened on August 26, 2017. Southbound/eastbound traffic remained on the existing span until October 6, 2017, when it was shifted to the new northbound/westbound span to allow for the completion of the new southbound/eastbound span. The northbound/westbound span of the new Tappan Zee Bridge temporarily carried four lanes in each direction until the new southbound/eastbound span was completed.

After some delays, the project was later expected to be completed by June 15, 2018, at a cost of $3.98 billion. However, the scheduled opening was later pushed back to mid-September. The new southbound/eastbound span was supposed to open to traffic on September 8, 2018. An opening ceremony was held on that date, but the traffic shift itself was delayed when a piece of the old bridge came loose on September 7 while being demolished. The opening of the eastbound span, which was 160 feet (49 m) away from the old bridge, was delayed until the old bridge could be stabilized. After the old bridge was stabilized, all lanes were opened on September 11, 2018.

The demolition of the old bridge started in November 2017 with the removal of the first steel section from the Rockland County approach. The work continued to April 2018 including the removal of the truss sections. In May 2018, the 10-million-pound main span was removed, leaving only the east and west approaches. The original plan was to complete the remaining demolition by taking down spans piece by piece in order to minimize the environmental impacts. However, when the instability of the eastern span was discovered in September 2018, it was decided to destroy it outright. The explosive demolition of the eastern approach took place on January 15, 2019, while the western approach was lowered onto a barge on May 12, 2019, and hauled away.

=== Structural problems ===
Reports of a coverup of structural problems emerged in December 2018. Dozens of bolts holding the steel girders together had failed, and some bolts broke more than a year after they had been tightened into the plates that hold the girders together. A presentation by a whistleblower included allegations that the bolts had broken due to hydrogen embrittlement, which weakened the metal. The number of failed bolts was abnormally high for a project the size of this bridge. Engineering experts warned that the structural problems could compound, causing the girders to fall and the bridge to collapse.

The issue was known as early as February 2016, when New York state officials had begun testing some bolts for breaks. The Attorney General of New York began investigating whether structural problems with the bridge had been covered up in 2017. According to a report in the Times Union, the attorney general's office relied on other investigations of the bridge instead of conducting its own investigations, and the office did not treat the allegations as serious. Third-party consultant Alta Vista conducted its own study, concluding in late 2017 that hydrogen embrittlement was not the cause of the broken bolts.

In March 2021, some records relating to the case were unsealed. Following this, U.S. Representative Mondaire Jones, whose district encompasses the bridge, and all Republican members of the New York State Assembly requested that the United States Department of Transportation investigate the allegations of structural deficiencies. In response, the Federal Highway Administration issued a statement claiming it had "no safety concerns" with either of the Tappan Zee Bridge's spans. In a lawsuit filed that month, a whistleblower claimed that TZC had knowingly delivered many defective high-strength bolts and taken measures to hide evidence of the defects. The NYSTA sued TZC in August 2024, claiming that around 61 of the 192 cables had been improperly installed and needed to be repaired.

== Description ==
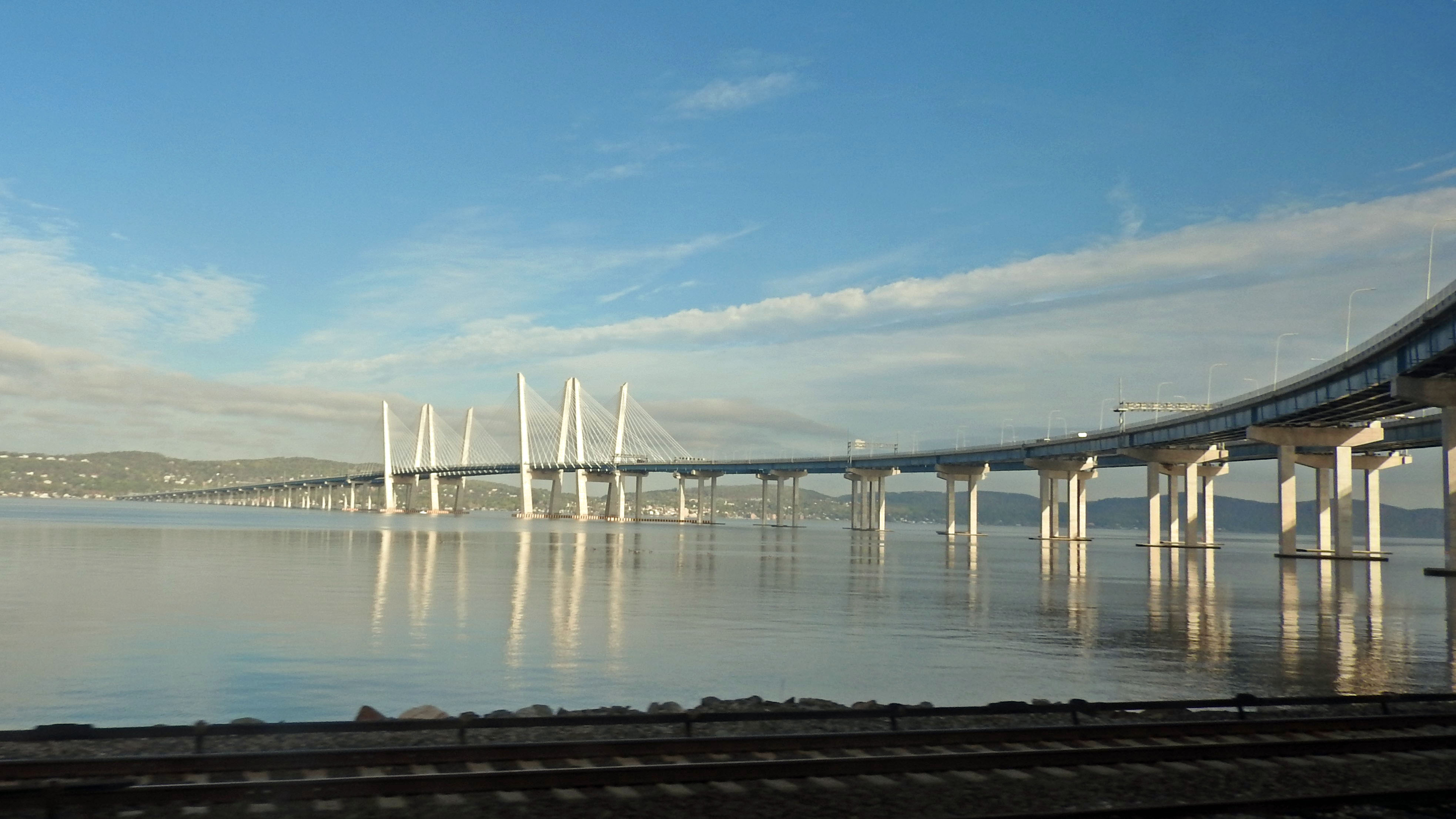
The bridge, seen from the Hudson Line, in 2023

The new Tappan Zee Bridge is composed of two cable-stayed decks and has a total length of 16,368 ft (4,989.0 m; 3.1 mi; 5.0 km). The main span of both decks is 1,200 ft (370 m) and is approached on either side by 515-foot-long (157 m) side spans. Each deck carries four lanes of traffic in one direction, plus inner and outer shoulders. The clearance below is 139 ft (42 m). Upon completion, the new Tappan Zee Bridge became one of the widest cable-stayed bridges in the world, having a combined width across both decks of 183 feet (56 m). The new spans equal the width of the relatively short-span, cable-stayed Leonard Zakim Bridge in Boston. Turkey's 3rd Bosphorus bridge, completed in 2016, has a single deck about 192 feet (59 m) wide. The new Tappan Zee Bridge is intended to last at least 100 years.

Each span contains four cable-stayed towers (two on each side of the Tappan Zee), with eight total across the length of the bridge. The towers are 419 feet (128 m) tall and lean five degrees outward from the vertical axis. The towers are constructed of open-box beams, with cross beams linking the towers below each deck. The towers support a total of 192 cable stays, which consist of 4,900 miles (7,900 km) of steel strands. The decks of each span are composed of precast concrete panels, connected underneath by "edge girders" running parallel to the edges of each deck, as well as floor beams running perpendicularly to the deck. The cable stays are anchored to the outer faces of the edge girders underneath each span. The bridge is supported by 1,250 girders, each measuring up to 120 feet (37 m) long and 12 feet (3.7 m) high. They are secured to splice plates by about 500 bolts.

=== Bicycle-pedestrian path ===
The north span has a bicycle and pedestrian path, which opened on June 15, 2020. This path connects the towns of Tarrytown and South Nyack and measures 3.6 miles (5.8 km) in length. It has visitor landings at each end, named after the counties of Rockland and Westchester. Both of these contain restrooms, brochures, and interactive displays. The Westchester visitor center also has vendors that operate in the spring and summer. The path is split into two lanes with bikes on the east and pedestrians on the west. The path has six scenic overlooks known as "belvederes." Each belvedere is named after a local point of interest and provides Wi-Fi, a seating area, bike racks (on most), informational kiosks, and trash cans. The path also contains LED displays for warning messages. The path is open from 6AM - 10PM every day, weather permitting. Unlike the nearby George Washington Bridge, the Tappan Zee Bridge path is often closed due to weather.

=== Lighting ===
The bridge lit up in orange and purple during the Tarrytown Halloween parade

The bridge is equipped with LEDs for the roadways and structures. The lights can be changed to a variety of colors for decorative purposes on major holidays such as Memorial Day and Christmas, traditional dates such as Mother's Day, Father's Day and St. Patrick's Day, and special commemorations throughout the year. The bridge's lights are dimmed from 11 p.m. to dawn during peak bird migration periods.

== Tolls ==
The Tappan Zee Bridge charges tolls in the Westchester southbound/eastbound direction only. On weekdays, tolls are variable based on the New York State Thruway's vehicle classification system and the time of day, and are collected using a cashless toll system. On weekends, each vehicle class pays a flat rate. E-ZPass users pay the lowest rate possible, the rate normally charged from 12:00 midnight to 6:14 a.m., while other users are charged using the highest rate possible, the rate normally charged from 7:00 a.m. to 8:59 a.m. Class 2L vehicles, which have a height of less than 7.5 feet (2.3 m) and contain two axles, pay a flat rate of $7.25 with a New York-issued E-ZPass, or $12.69 with toll-by-plate or an out-of-state E-ZPass.

== Public transportation ==
The Hudson Link BRT runs the HO3, HO5, HO7, and HO7X across the bridge. In the summer months Hudson Link also runs free shuttle buses on the route of the HO7 bus. Responding to widespread concerns about the lack of new public transit services, bridge planners agreed only to build one "dedicated express bus lane" in each direction for use during rush hour. Construction on the new bridge's bus lanes finished in 2020, leaving one bus lane in each direction. Early plans also called for Metro-North Railroad commuter rail service on the bridge, but ultimately the span was built without commuter rail tracks.

== Naming ==
During construction, the project's website referred to the crossing as the "New NY Bridge." However, other sources referred to it as the "New Tappan Zee Bridge". Governor Andrew Cuomo signed a bill to name the bridge after his late father, former Governor Mario Cuomo, on June 29, 2017. This has been met with significant opposition from residents of nearby localities, largely due to the fact the new name did not include "Tappan Zee" like its predecessor; this name has been viewed as an homage to the Tappan tribe that inhabited the area as well as Dutch settlers who arrived during the 17th century. Many, including the daughter of former New York Governor Malcolm Wilson (whose name was on the original Tappan Zee Bridge), were vocal in their opposition to the name. A Reclaim New York Initiative poll of Rockland and Westchester county residents found only 14.7% of respondents supported the new name. As of November 29, 2017, over 100,000 people had signed a Change.org petition called "Return the Cuomo Bridge its original name: The Tappan Zee. That bridge is our history." Despite the official name, "Tappan Zee Bridge" remains a common name for the structure.

Lawmakers have proposed several bills to rename the bridge. On December 6, 2017, State Assemblyman Kevin Byrne, a Republican from Mahopac in Putnam County, announced that he would introduce legislation to change the name of the bridge to the "Malcolm Wilson Tappan Zee Bridge." The old Tappan Zee Bridge had been named for Wilson from 1994 to October 2017. A compromise bill to rename the bridge the "Governor Mario M. Cuomo Tappan Zee Bridge" was later introduced and sponsored by both Senate Deputy Majority Leader John DeFrancisco, Republican of Upstate New York, as well as Assemblyman Byrne. On June 20, 2018, the State Senate voted 40–20 in favor of renaming the bridge. However, the effort failed after the Assembly's legislative session ended without the bill being put to a vote.

After Andrew Cuomo's resignation in August 2021 due to sexual harassment allegations, another bill to change the official name to "Tappan Zee Bridge" was proposed in the New York state legislature. In February 2023, state senator James Skoufis sponsored another bill to change the official name of the bridge to the "Tappan Zee Bridge," becoming the first Democrat to sponsor such legislation.

== See also ==
- List of fixed crossings of the Hudson River
- Public-private partnerships in the United States
