= Samson and Goliath (cranes) =

Shipbuilding gantry cranes in Belfast

Coordinates: 54.6080°N 5.9008°W

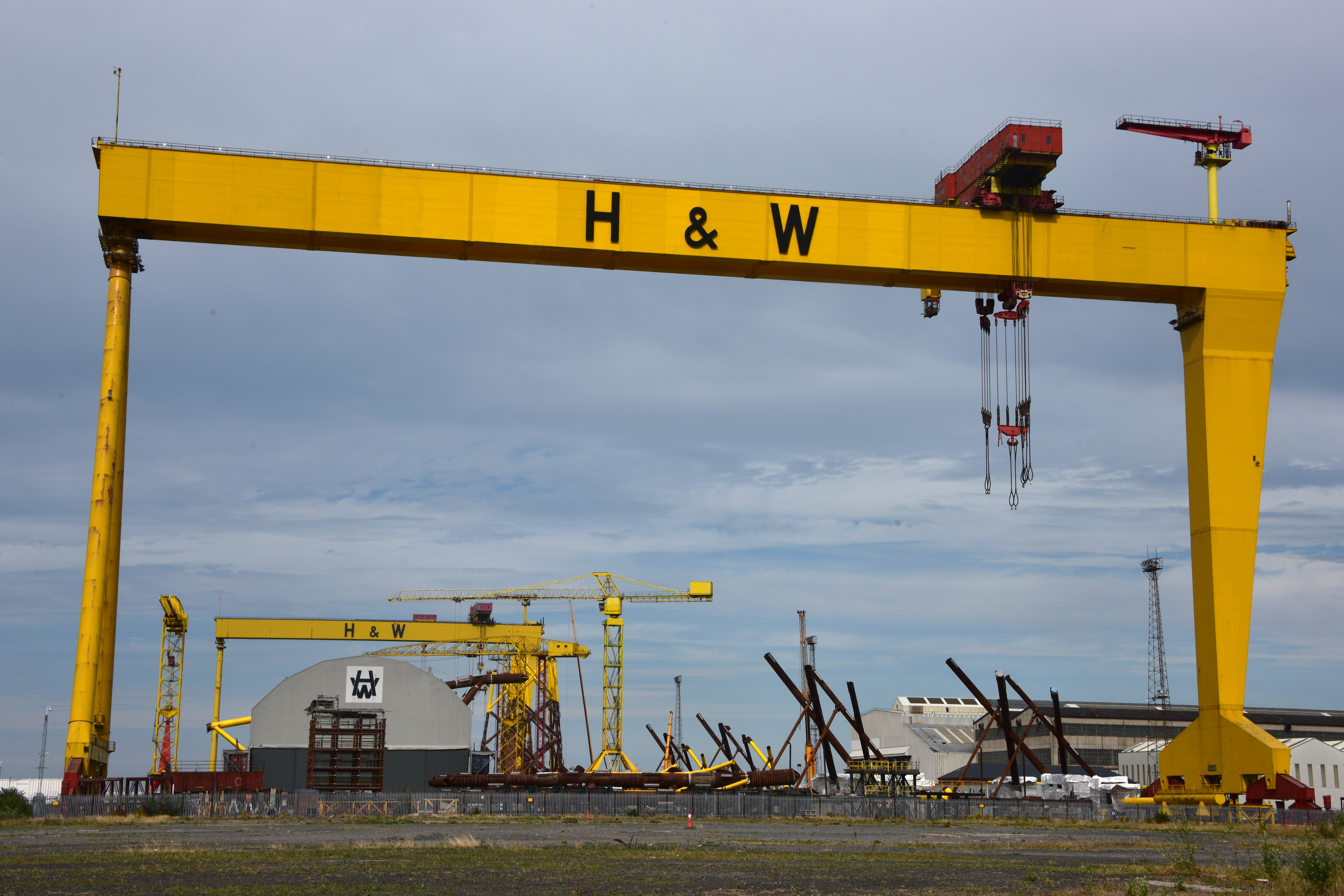
Goliath (foreground) and Samson (background) in 2018

Samson and Goliath are the twin shipbuilding gantry cranes at Queen's Island, Belfast, Northern Ireland. The cranes, which were named after the Biblical figures Samson and Goliath, dominate the Belfast skyline and are landmark structures.

== History ==
The cranes are situated in the Harland and Wolff shipyard on the east side of Belfast Lough. They were made by the German engineering firm Krupp and the materials transported to Belfast. Goliath was erected in 1969 and Samson in 1974. Goliath stands 96 metres (315 ft) tall, while Samson is a little taller at 106 metres (348 ft).

Goliath sits further inland, closer to the city. The dry dock at the base of the cranes is the 11th largest in the world, measuring 556 m × 93 m (1,824 ft × 305 ft).

== Lifting capacity ==
Each crane has a span of 140 metres (459 ft) and can lift loads of up to 840 tonnes to a height of 70 metres (230 ft). Their combined lifting capacity of almost 1,700 tonnes is one of the largest in the world. Prior to commissioning, the cranes were tested up to 1,000 tonnes, which bent the gantry downwards by over 30 centimetres (12 in).

== Harland & Wolff ==
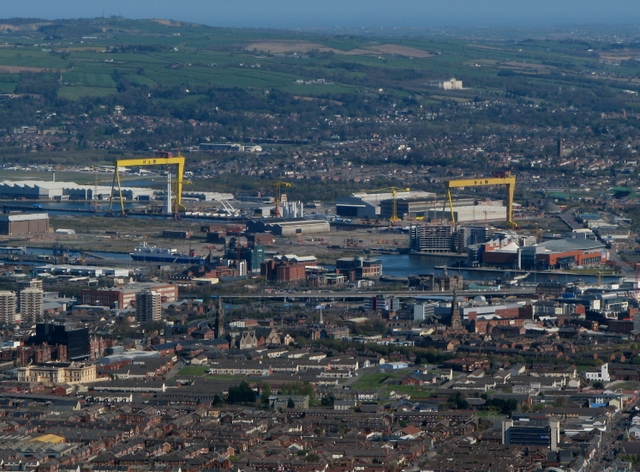
Samson (l) and Goliath viewed from Black Mountain

At its height Harland & Wolff boasted 35,000 employees and a healthy order book, but in the years following the cranes' construction the workforce and business declined. The last ship to be launched at the yard to date was a roll-on/roll-off ferry in March 2003. Since then the yard has restructured itself to focus less on shipbuilding and more on design and structural engineering, as well as ship repair, offshore construction projects and competing for other projects to do with metal engineering and construction. Initially there was concern that the now largely redundant cranes would be demolished. However, they were later scheduled as historic monuments under Article 3 of the Historic Monuments and Archaeological Objects (Northern Ireland) Order 1995.

Northern Ireland Office Minister of the time Angela Smith stated: "These cranes are an essential part of our city, our roots and our culture."

The cranes are not, technically, ‘listed buildings’, but are recognised by the Northern Ireland Environment Agency as buildings of ‘architectural or historic interest’.

Shipbuilding has declined in Belfast, but the cranes are to be retained as part of the existing dry dock facility within the restructured shipyard, situated adjacent to the Titanic Quarter, a business, light industrial, leisure and residential development on land now surplus to the heavy industrial requirements of the shipyard on Queen's Island. They were still (2015) kept in working order and used for heavy lifting by Harland & Wolff in its other activities.

== Recent history ==
On 4 April 2007, Samson collided with the long jib of smaller rail-mounted "Henson" tower crane, sending the smaller crane tumbling to the ground. The smaller crane weighed 95 tonnes and stood at a height of 25 metres (82 ft), compared to Samson's 106 metres (348 ft). Three industrial painters working on another rail-mounted crane were close to the jib as it fell, eventually crashing onto the ground. Information about the incident was not released until mobile-phone footage of the event was published on YouTube.

In October 2007, Goliath re-entered service after five years, an occurrence described by a company spokesman as underlining the yard's growing workload.

In April 2020, during the beginning of the COVID-19 pandemic lockdown, the cranes' sirens were sounded for the first time in 20 years in honour of NHS staff. The sound carried over Belfast and as far away as Carrickfergus.

Goliath appears repeatedly as part of series 1 of BBC One's drama Bloodlands, with postcards of the crane a key clue in the murder investigation.

As of August 2026, Goliath was the first to undergo refurbishment to return both cranes to service as part of Harland and Wolff's contract to build three vessels for the Royal Fleet Auxiliary. These will be the first ships built in Belfast since MV Anvil Point in 2003.

== Gallery ==
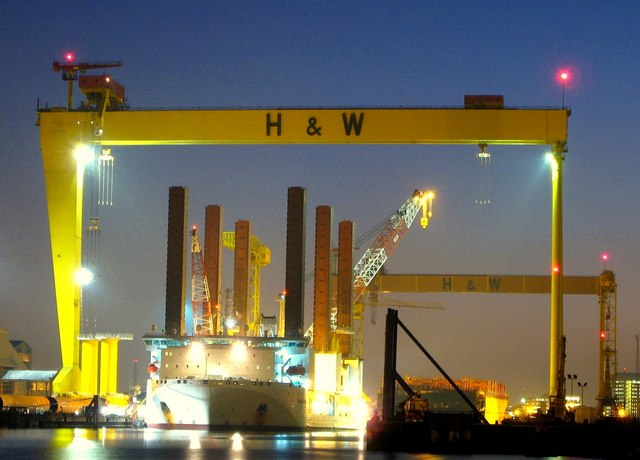
The cranes lit up at night

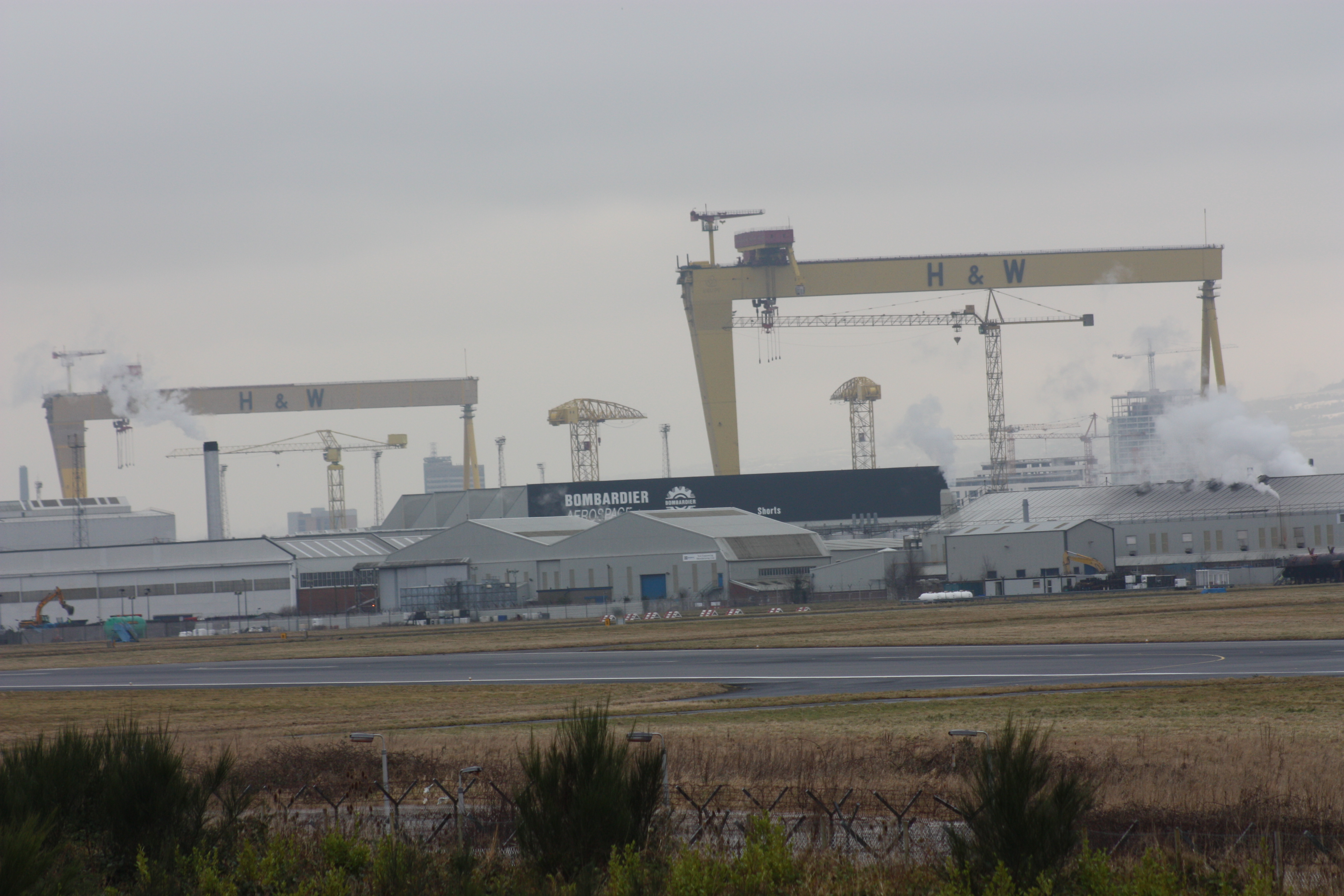
View from Belfast City Airport

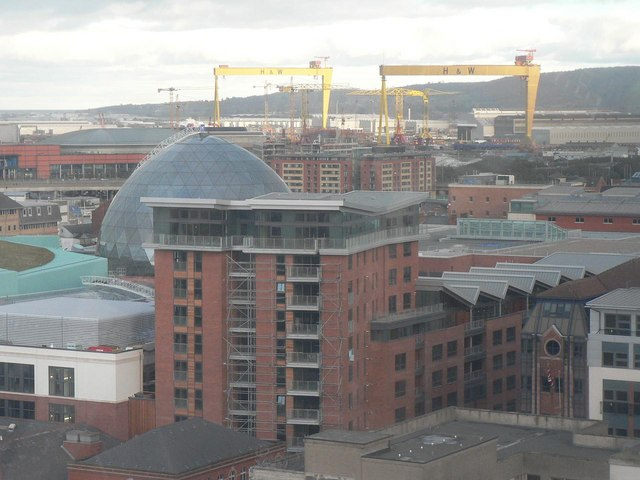
View across Belfast's city skyline

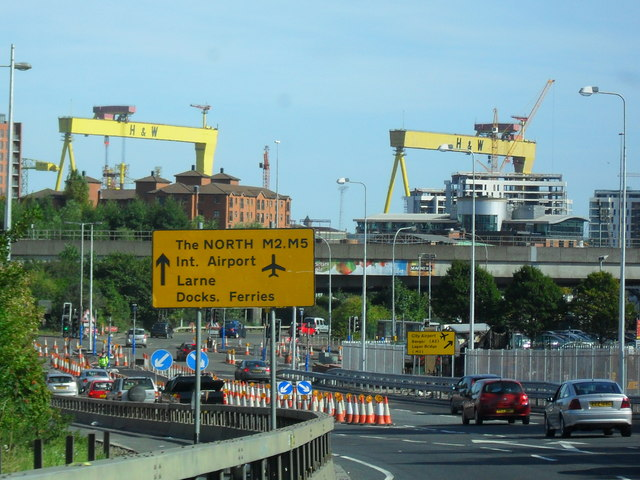
View from Westlink approaching York Street

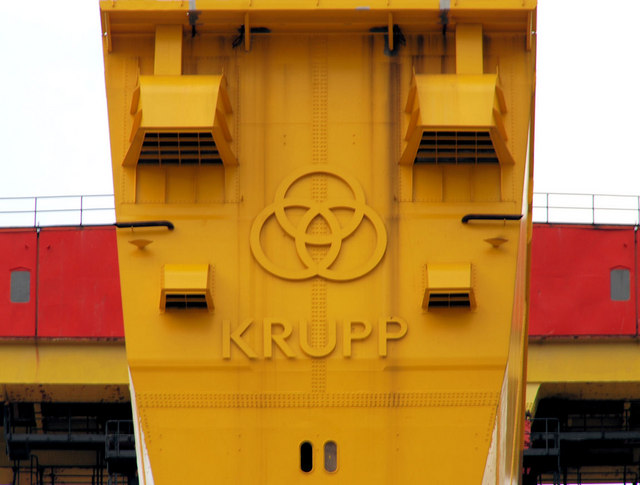
Krupp logo on the side of Goliath

== See also ==
- Arrol Gantry
- Eriksberg Crane
- Finnieston Crane
- Kockums Crane
- Taisun
- Titan Clydebank
