= Broström =

Broström or Brostrom is a surname, and may refer to:

- Anders Broström (born 1952), retired Swedish ice hockey player
- Axel Ludvig Broström (1838 – 1905), Swedish shipping owner
- Dan Broström (1870 – 1925), Swedish Naval Minister
- Frida Broström (born 1982), Swedish footballer
- Gunnel Broström (1922–2012), Swedish stage, film, and television actor
- Leonard C. Brostrom (1919 - 1944), US soldier, Medal of Honor recipient
