= Left Coast Lifter =

Floating derrick barge

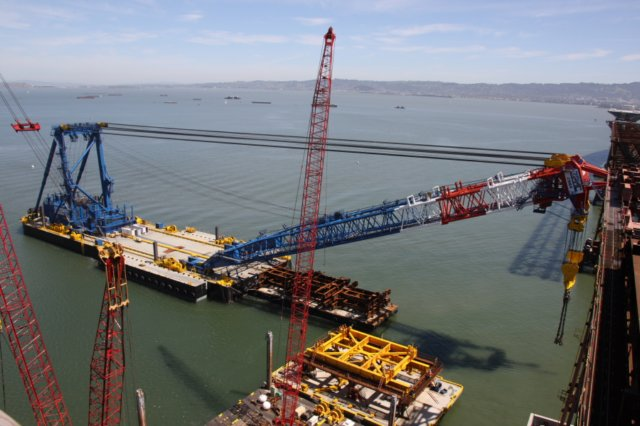
- Left Coast Lifter at work on the Bay Bridge; 28 May 2011

History

US
- Name: Left Coast Lifter
- Operator: Tappan Zee Constructors
- Builder: U.S. Barge LLC
- Yard number: Hull 2
- Completed: 2009
- In service: since 2009
- Home port: Wilmington
- Identification: USCG ID 1206934
- Status: In service

General characteristics
- Class & type: Floating barge crane
- Tonnage: 7,695 GT
- Length: 384 feet (117 m)
- Beam: 99.8 feet (30 m)
- Draught: 22 feet (7 m)
- Propulsion: none

Left Coast Lifter is a floating derrick barge or sheerleg which was built to assist in the eastern span replacement of the San Francisco–Oakland Bay Bridge. The barge carries a shear legs crane which is the largest barge crane ever used on the U.S. West Coast. The barge's name is taken from "Left Coast", a slang phrase that plays on the fact that the U.S. West Coast is on the left of the United States when viewing a map with north oriented at the top.

== Operational history ==
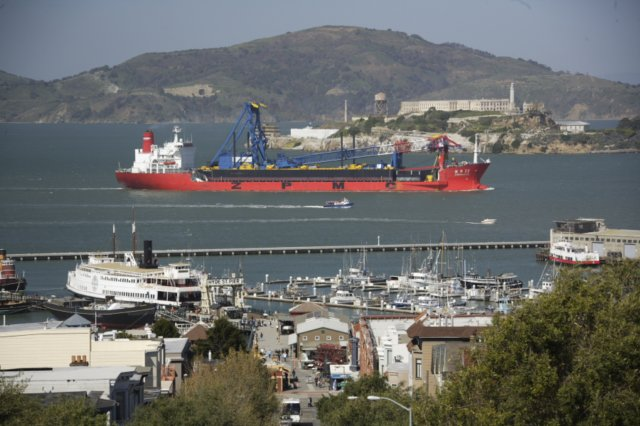
Zhenhua 22 ferrying Left Coast Lifter past Alcatraz Island.

Left Coast Lifter was built for the American Bridge/Fluor joint venture (ABFJV), which was the lead contractor on the self-anchored suspension eastern span replacement. The barge was built in Portland, Oregon by U.S. Barge, LLC and ferried to Shanghai, where it was fitted with a shear-leg crane manufactured by Shanghai Zhenhua Port Machinery Co. Ltd (ZPMC). The completed sheerleg was ferried back to the United States on a semi-submersible heavy-lift ship, Zhen Hua 22 (IMO 8106446). The total cost was approximately US$50,000,000 (equivalent to $75,030,000 in 2025).

Before Left Coast Lifter was fitted out with the crane for bridge construction, it was deemed to violate the Jones Act because, since the integral crane would be built and installed in China, it could not be used to transport goods by water between U.S. ports. Therefore its first job, prior to installation of the crane, was to haul dredged materials to Long Beach.

=== Bay Bridge ===
After Left Coast Lifter arrived at the Bay Area in March 2009, it was used to place pre-fabricated falsework truss sections and the 28 box girder deck sections. Before the heavy deck sections for the Bay Bridge were lifted, Left Coast Lifter raised a sunken tugboat in August 2009, USS Wenonah. The first deck section was lifted in February 2010, and the last deck section was lifted in October 2011.

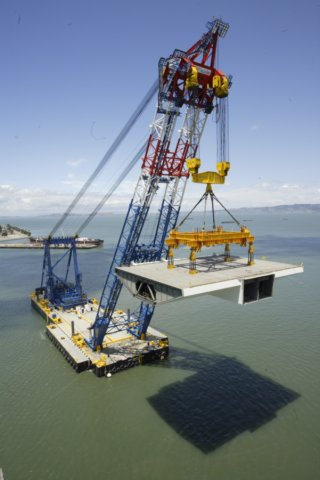
Left Coast Lifter raises a prefabricated steel bridge segment for the new eastern span of the Bay Bridge.

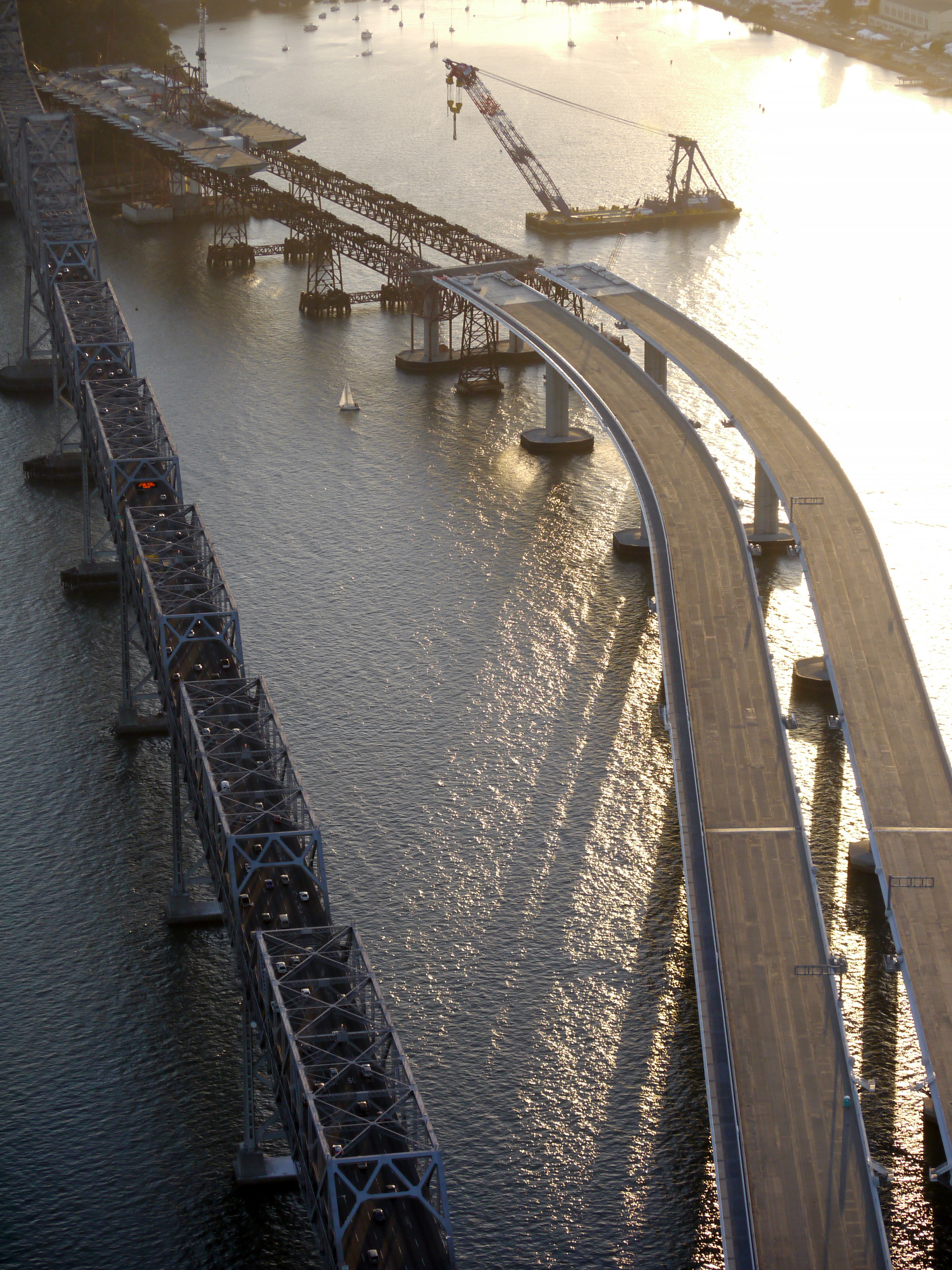
Left Coast Lifter and the old and new eastern spans of the Bay Bridge near Yerba Buena Island (2010).

=== Tappan Zee Bridge ===
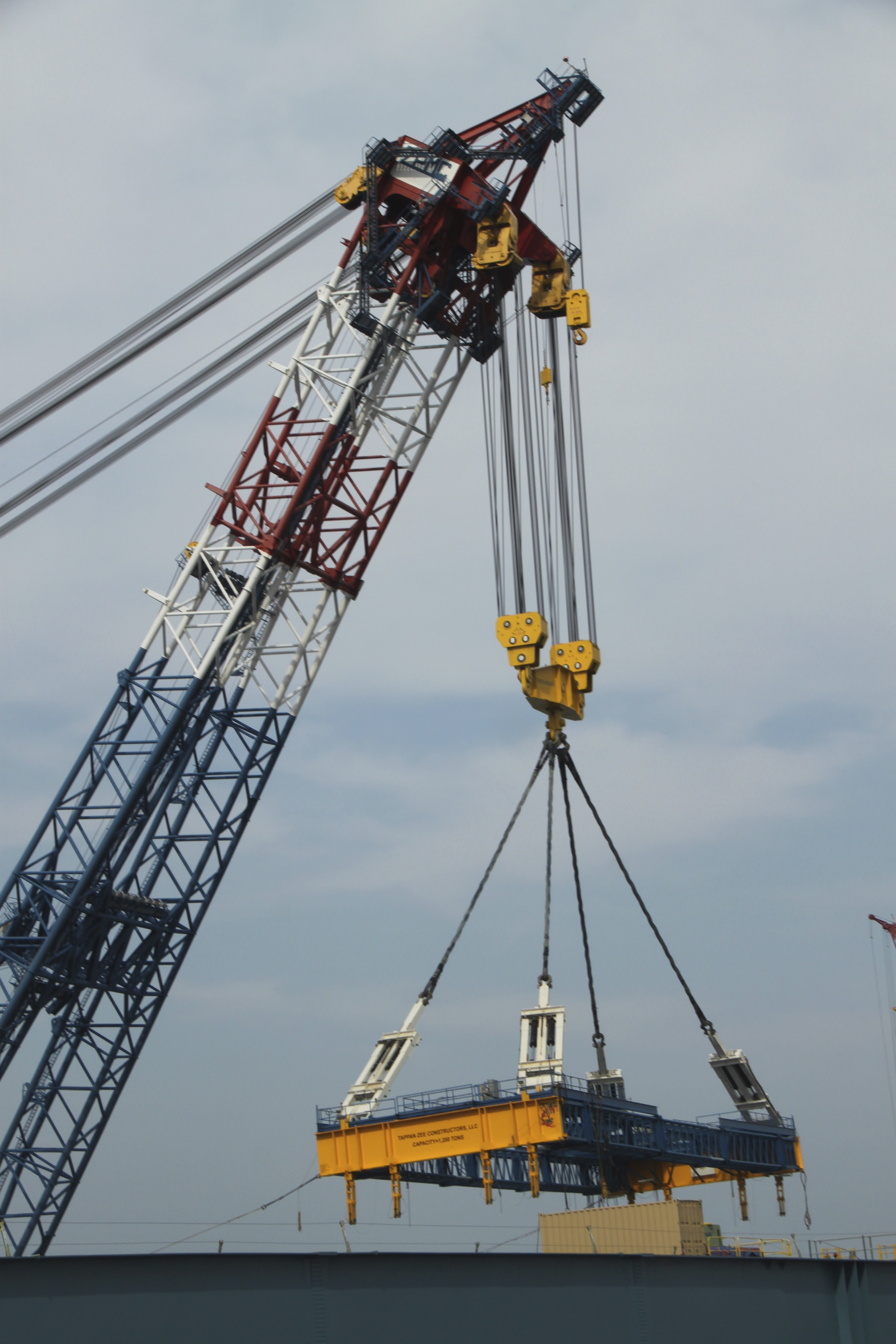
Left Coast Lifter working on the new Tappan Zee bridge.

American Bridge/Fluor solicited offers for Left Coast Lifter in 2012, after the conclusion of its work on the Bay Bridge. A consortium of companies, Tappan Zee Constructors (TZC, a joint venture of Fluor, American Bridge, Granite and Traylor Brothers), purchased the crane barge, which gave them a competitive edge in the bidding process for the construction of the Tappan Zee Bridge replacement across the Hudson River. Reportedly, according to the purchase agreement between TZC and ABFJV, Left Coast Lifter will be returned to ABFJV once the work on the Tappan Zee Bridge is completed.

Now nicknamed I Lift NY, the barge is still officially registered with the U.S. Coast Guard as Left Coast Lifter. The crane departed San Francisco Bay under tow in December 2013, transited the Panama Canal in January 2014, and arrived at Jersey City at the end of January. There it was refitted with an upgraded control system before arriving at the job site in October 2014. Left Coast Lifter made its first lift on the new Tappan Zee bridge in April 2015, a steel-reinforced concrete pile cap which formed part of the bridge's foundation.

The massive crane was being used for heavy lifts of large bridge sections, and placed the final steel girder for the new Rockland-bound (westbound) span in October 2016. The final lift for the eastbound span to Westchester was completed in April 2018. Between and after the assembly of the new bridge spans, Lifter was also used for heavy lifts during the dismantling of the original Tappan Zee Bridge at that location.

The eastern span of the old Tappan Zee Bridge was dropped into the Hudson via controlled detonation in January 2019; although the intent was to dismantle the bridge in place, during opening celebrations for the replacement bridge in September 2018, a loud pop was heard and the original Tappan Zee bridge was closed to workers, as engineers determined it had become unstable. The Federal Highway Administration approved a revised plan to detonate the original bridge's supports in December 2018. "I Lift NY" was used to retrieve portions of the old bridge from the Hudson; in October 2019, the crane left the Hudson and was stored on Staten Island, at Caddell Dry Dock and Repair Co., Inc.

=== Spuyten Duyvil Bridge ===
Left Coast Lifter was also used for a heavy lift during the summer 2018 maintenance of the Spuyten Duyvil Bridge; the crane moved the swing section of the bridge onto a barge in June to facilitate work on electrical and mechanical equipment that had been damaged during Hurricane Sandy. The bridge was repaired by August, and train service returned to the bridge in September 2018.

=== Pacific Titan ===
After being purchased by Stor Kran, Left Coast Lifter returned to the west coast under the updated nickname Pacific Titan in October 2025. The crane stopped at the Port of Olympia where adjustments were made enroute to her new homeport in Seattle, Washington. Stor Kran is a company formed to purchase and operate Left Coast Lifter.

== Design ==
The barge was designed by Glowacki Engineering (GE). It is generally a single rake 400' x 100' deck cargo barge. However it features various significant internal structural enhancements to bear the loads imposed at the deck level by the crane at the boom foot, the mast, and the back stays. GE received those loads from ZPMC and modified their design to suit. Liftech Consultants assisted ABFJV with design review for the crane, including developing the technical specifications sent to ZPMC. The project received three Excellence in Structural Engineering awards:

- 2010 Award of Excellence for Special-Use Structures, from the Structural Engineers Association of Northern California
- 2010 Award of Merit for Special-Use Structures, from the Structural Engineers Association of California
- 2011 Outstanding Project, from the National Council of Structural Engineers Associations

While transporting the sheerleg, the heel pin support may be moved towards the bow of the barge in order to lower the boom and the overall profile of the barge, facilitating transport.

The shear-leg crane on Left Coast Lifter has a 328-foot (100 m) long boom, weighing 992 short tons (900 t) with a 1,873-short-ton (1,699 t) lift capacity. It is the largest barge crane ever used on the U.S. West Coast.

== See also ==
- Big Blue
- Breakwater Crane Railway
- Finnieston Crane
- Fairbairn steam crane
- Kockums Crane
- Mastekranen
- Samson & Goliath
- Taisun
- Titan Clydebank
