= USS Wenonah (YT-148) =

Tugboat of the United States Navy

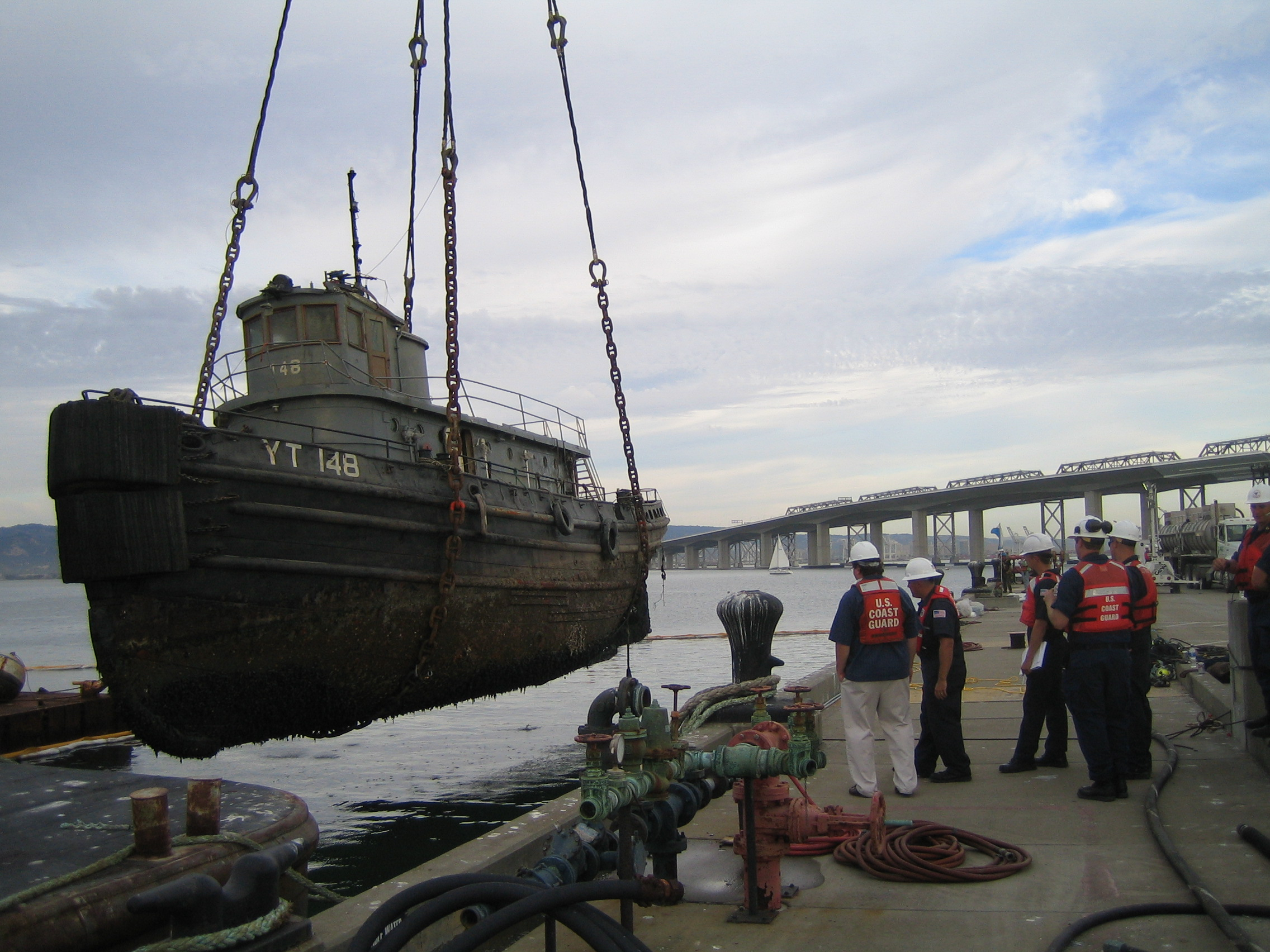
- Bow view of the raised USS Wenonah

History

United States
- Name: USS Wenonah
- Builder: Consolidated Shipbuilding Corp., Morris Heights, New York
- Laid down: date unknown
- Completed: during the winter of 1940 and 1941
- Commissioned: June 1941 as Wenonah (YT-148)
- Decommissioned: 1974
- Reclassified: YTB-148, 15 May 1944 - YTM-148, in February 1962
- Stricken: April 1974
- Home port: San Diego, California
- Identification: IMO number: 8424604
- Fate: Scrapped in 2010 by Bay Yacht (Alameda).

General characteristics
- Class & type: Woban-class district harbor tugboat
- Tonnage: 218 tons
- Displacement: 325 tons
- Length: 100 ft (30 m)
- Beam: 25 ft (7.6 m)
- Draft: 11 ft (3.4 m) (max.)
- Propulsion: diesel engine, single screw
- Speed: 12 knots
- Complement: 12 officers and enlisted
- Armament: not known

USS Wenonah (YT-148/YTB-148/YTM-148) was a Woban-class district harbor tug which served during World War II in California ports, and continued her service until she was struck by the Navy in 1974. On 17 August 2009, the Wenonah sank while berthed at Treasure Island, CA, and was raised by the floating crane Left Coast Lifter on 28 August 2009.

== Constructed in New York ==
Wenonah (YT-148) -- a harbor tug constructed during the winter of 1940 and 1941 at Morris Heights, New York, by the Consolidated Shipbuilding Corp. -- was placed in service soon after her completion in June 1941.

== World War II service ==
Wenonah served in the 11th Naval District throughout her entire Navy career. She was initially based at San Diego, California; but, during her 33 years of service, she also operated at and visited various other ports on the California coast.

== Designation changes ==
On 15 May 1944, she was redesignated a large harbor tug with the hull designation, YTB-148. Some 18 years later, she again changed designation and became YTM-148, a medium harbor tug.

== Decommissioning and scrapping ==
In April 1974, she concluded her long career and went out of service. Her name was struck from the Navy list, and she was sold for scrapping. The identity of her purchaser is unrecorded, but sources say that the tug was owned by the Historic Tugboat Education and Restoration Society (HTERS). Wenonah was laid up at Pier 1 at Treasure Island, California, and sank in August 2009, spilling oil into San Francisco Bay. The Coast Guard contracted Global Diving to recover the vessel to prevent further leaks, and Global Diving turned to the American Bridge/Fluor Joint Venture for use of the Left Coast Lifter sheerleg crane to recover the vessel. Wenonah was turned over to the Coast Guard for disposal, and Bay Ship & Yacht in Alameda assumed the lease of Pier 1 in Treasure Island, which included taking possession of Wenonah and a sister tug owned by HTERS, USS Nokomis. Both vessels were scrapped in 2010 in Alameda.
