= Götaverken =

Swedish shipbuilding company (1841-1989)

AB Götaverken
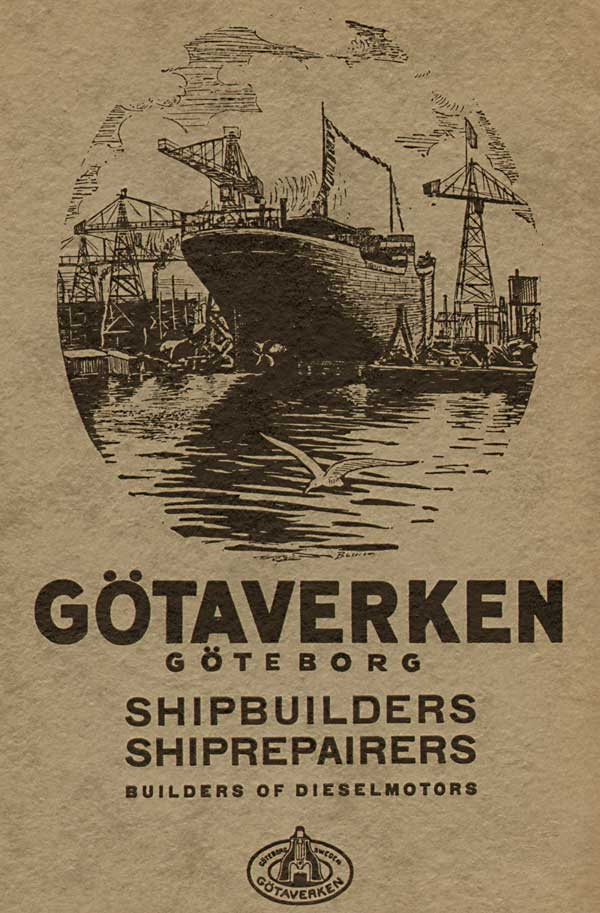
- Industry: Shipbuilding
- Founded: 1841
- Defunct: 1989
- Fate: Shipyard amalgamated into Svenska Varv AB, 1977
- Successor: Svenska Varv AB
- Headquarters: Gothenburg, Sweden
- Products: Civilian ships

Götaverken was a Swedish shipbuilding company that was located on Hisingen, Gothenburg. It was founded in 1841, and ceased building ships in 1989.

== History ==
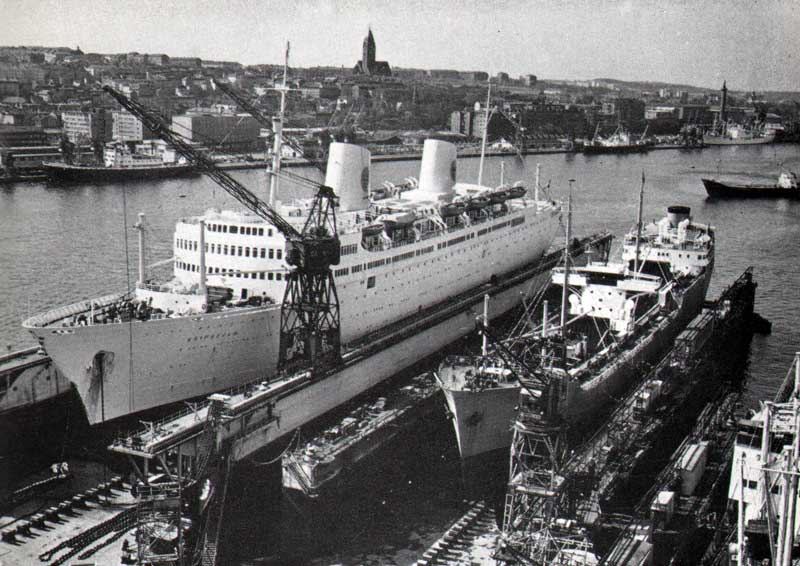
Götavarvet in the 1960s

The company was founded in 1841 by Scottish businessman Alexander Keiller under the name Keillers Werkstad i Göteborg, and was aimed at industrial production. After bankruptcy in 1867, the company was reorganised into Göteborgs Mekaniska Verkstads AB.

In 1906, the majority of the company's shares were taken over by Hugo Hammar and Sven Almqvist. Because of this, the company was reorganised into Göteborgs Nya Verkstads AB and the shipyard's capacity was increased. In 1916 the shipyard was renamed to AB Götaverken. During the 1930s, the company had grown so much that Götaverken became the world's biggest shipyard by launched gross registered tonnage. In 1950 a completely new shipyard was built at Arendal, which is also located in Gothenburg. When the shipyard was completed in 1963, it was internationally unique because most of the building was done indoors. Their old shipyard (Cityvarvet) closed down in 1968.

In 1971, the company was taken over by Salénrederierna AB. And in 1977, the state-owned shipbuilding company, Svenska Varv AB, took over Salénrederierna because of the Swedish shipyard crisis. During this last period of the company's history, they searched for alternatives to the traditional production of tankers and ore transporters. The company tried to aim its production towards special vessels, such as icebreakers, ferries and freezer ships. In 1989, the state-owned icebreaker Oden was delivered from Arendal as Götaverkens last own-made ship.

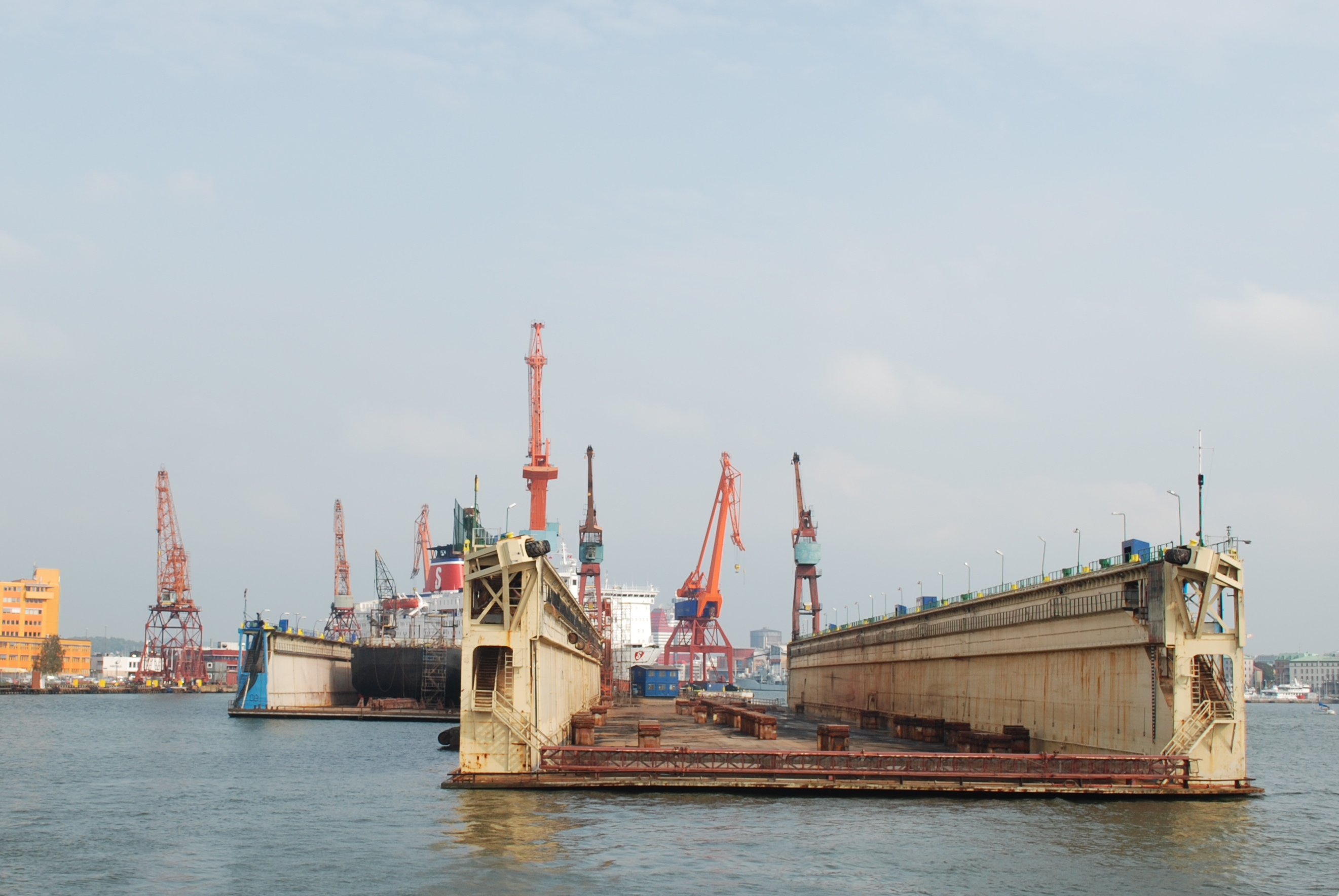
Götaverken Cityvarvet 2010

However, Götaverken Cityvarvet survived the crisis and would for the next few decades perform repairs, maintenance, and renovation of ships. In 2000 the shipyard was purchased by the Dutch group Damen Shipyards Group before ultimately being closed in 2015.

Götaverkens head office, located at Lindholmen, was built in 1951. After the Swedish shipyard crisis and Götaverkens restructuring, the building has been unoccupied since 1991. During 2006, the building underwent an extensive renovation for approximately one hundred million Swedish kronor. In the beginning of December 2006, ESAB moved in.

== Aircraft production and projects ==
- GV38: License-built version of the Rearwin Sportster, 14 built 1938-1943
- GV8: proposal for a government competition which was won by the Saab 18
