= Frida Broström =

Swedish footballer

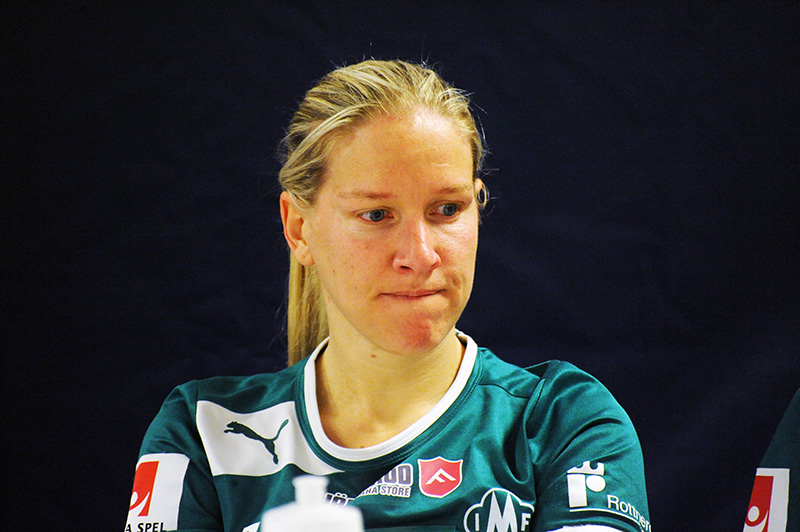

Personal information
- Full name: Frida Broström
- Date of birth: 2 August 1982 (age 44)
- Place of birth: Sweden
- Position: Defender

Team information
- Current team: Mallbackens IF
- Number: 19

Senior career*
Years	Team	Apps	(Gls)
2012–	Mallbackens IF	240	(23)
- * Club domestic league appearances and goals as of 2 November 2020

Frida Broström (born 2 August 1982) is a Swedish football defender who plays for Mallbackens IF.
