= Eriksberg, Gothenburg =

Urban subdivision in Gothenburg, Sweden

Coordinates: 57°42′N 11°55′E

Eriksberg is an area on Hisingen in Gothenburg where Eriksbergs Mekaniska Verkstads AB had their shipyard until bankruptcy in 1979. For over a century the area was dominated by shipbuilding but a crisis in the 1970s destroyed the industry.

Since the collapse of the shipyards, the area has been rebuilt into a modern neighbourhood. The former machinery buildings have been renovated into a hotel with conference facilities. An 84-metre high gantry crane – the Eriksberg crane – stands as a remnant of the area's shipbuilding past.

A large grass area, now used for apartment buildings, was used for concerts from 1987 to 1990 (when Ullevi was closed for such concerts). Michael Jackson performed in front of 106,000 people for 2 sold-out shows during his Bad World Tour in June 1988. U2 and David Bowie performed in 1987, and the Rolling Stones and Madonna in 1990.

In 2014, the progressive metal band Evergrey from Gothenburg filmed a music video for the song "King Of Errors" from their album Hymns for the Broken atop the Eriksberg gantry crane.

== Gallery ==
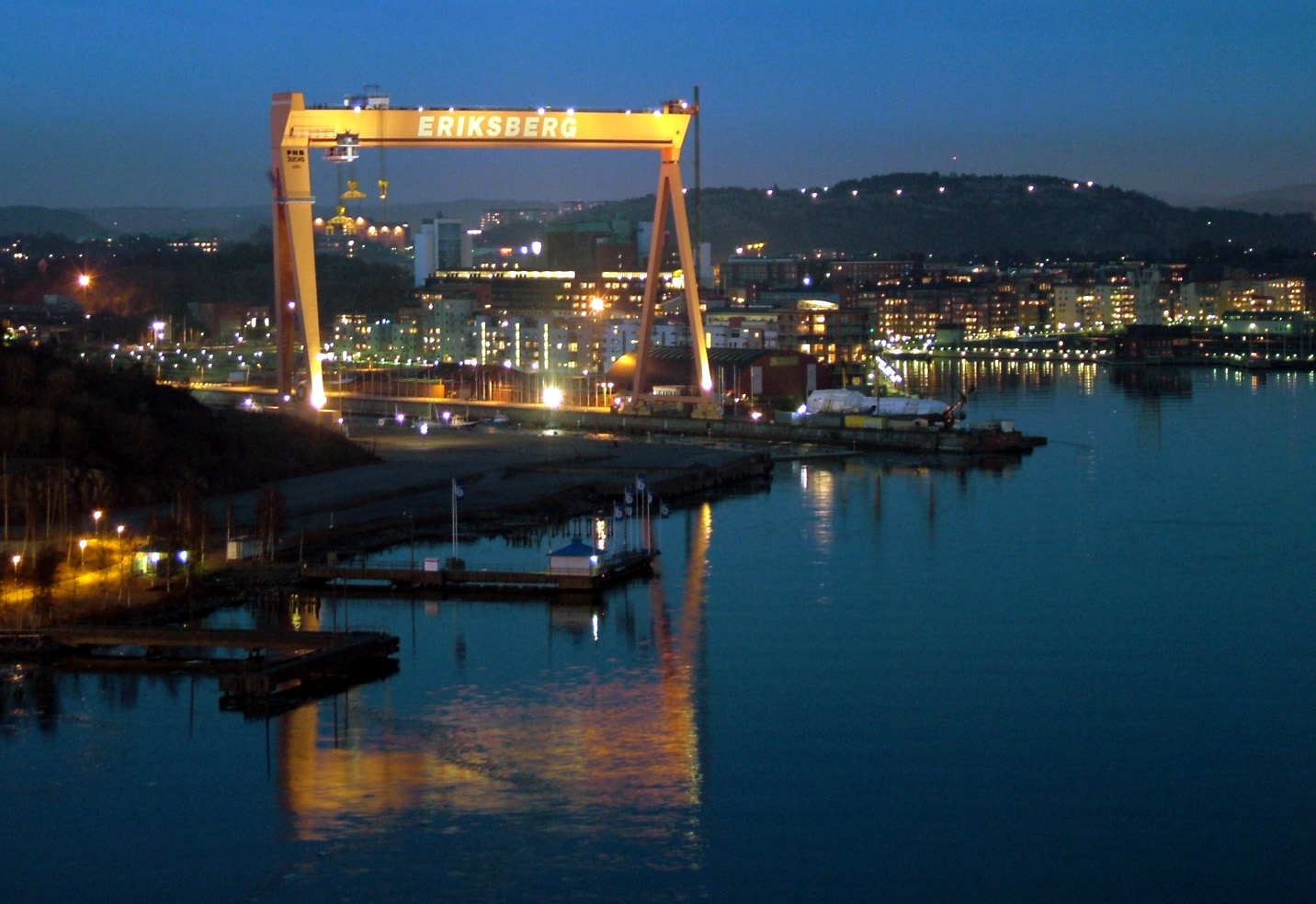
The Eriksberg crane (2002)

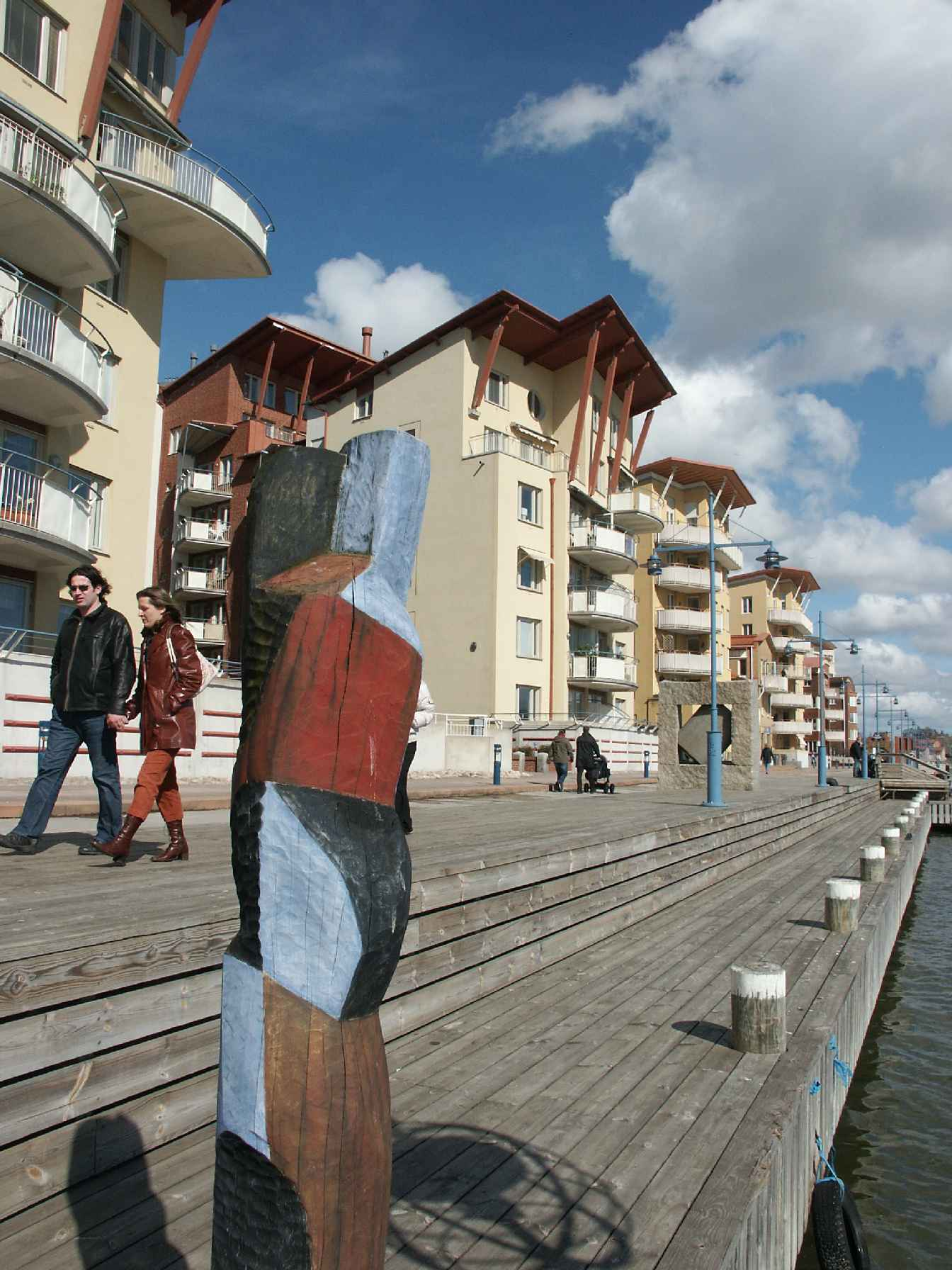
Post-industrial apartment buildings in Eriksberg

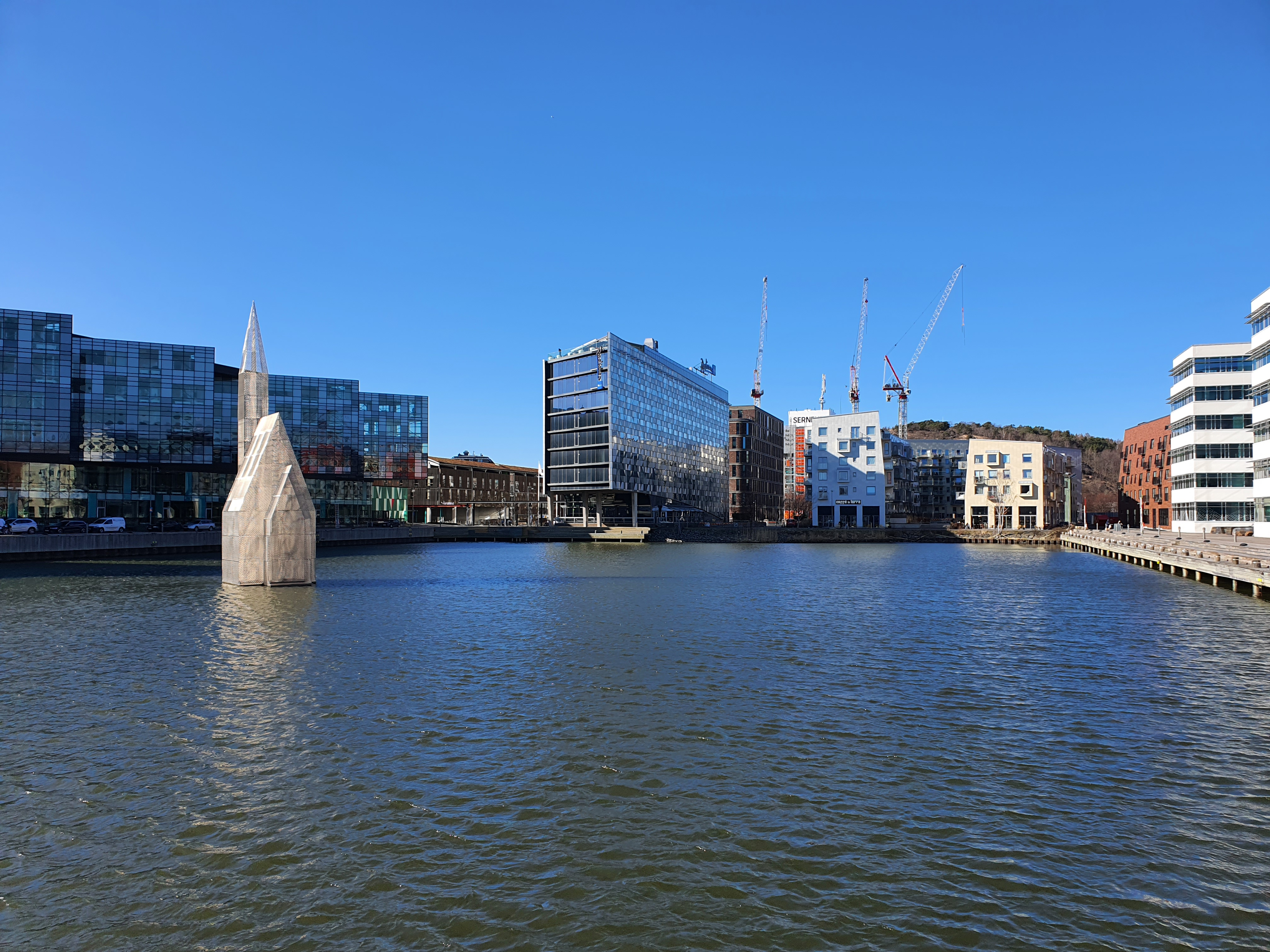
An area of Eriksberg (2020)

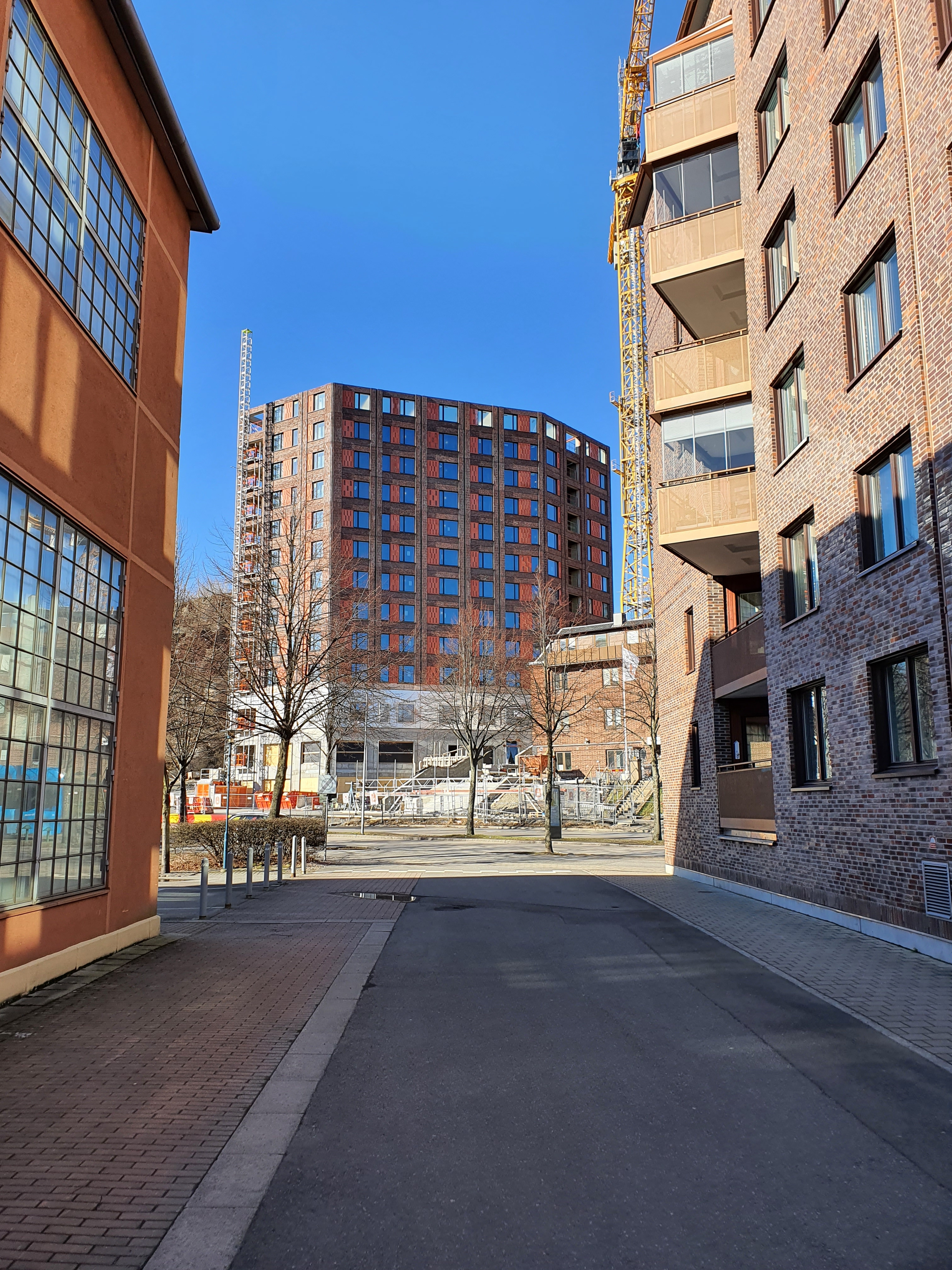
A high rise residential building (est. completion in 2022)
