= Lisnave =

Shipyard in Setúbal, Portugal

Lisnave Shipyard
- Industry: Ship repair
- Headquarters: Setúbal, Portugal
- Number of employees: 305 (in 2011)
- Website: https://www.lisnave.pt

Lisnave is a ship repair company based in Setúbal, Portugal.

== History ==
The Rocha Shipyards were founded in 1937 and renamed Lisnave - Estaleiros Navais de Lisboa in 1961. Beginning in 1967, the shipyards focused mainly on ship repair rather than new construction. That year, new large shipyards went into operation at Margueira.

In 1973, a new shipbuilding and repair yard was built at Mitrena in Setúbal. In 1997, a restructuring plan was initiated and completed in 2000 with the closure of the Margueira Yard. Subsequently, operations are mainly performed at Mitrena Yard.
