= Svenska Varv =

Svenska Varv AB was a Swedish state-owned company that was founded in 1977. It was formed to liquidate the many unprofitable assets of the Swedish shipbuilding industry which experienced a major financial crisis during 1969–1985 due to competition from the Far East as well as the effects of the 1973 oil crisis and the ensuing recession. The company originally consisted of Götaverken, Uddevallavarvet and Karlskronavarvet. Later, Eriksberg, Finnboda, Kockums, Karlskronavarvet and Öresundsvarvet joined the company. In 1987 the company changed its name to Celsius AB and became a defence contractor after all of the major shipbuilding wharfs were successfully closed down. Celsius AB was listed on the Stockholm Stock Exchange in 1993, and was acquired by Saab AB in 1999.
