= List of destroyers of the Swedish Navy =

Ships of the
Swedish Navy
Capital ships
Coastal defence ships
Corvettes
Cruisers
Destroyers
Frigates
Mine warfare vessels
Monitors
Patrol vessels
Gunboats
Sloops of war
Submarines
Torpedo boats

This is a list of Swedish destroyers commissioned between 1902 and 1959. The Swedish Navy has once re-numbered all its destroyers. Some ships were assigned hull numbers, which were later changed. Other ships have generally been issued a number, but never wore it. Some destroyers of the Göteborg and Visby classes were rebuilt between 1966–68 and were reclassified as frigates, changing their hull numbers from J to F. No ship has ever had the hull number J15.

== By hull number ==
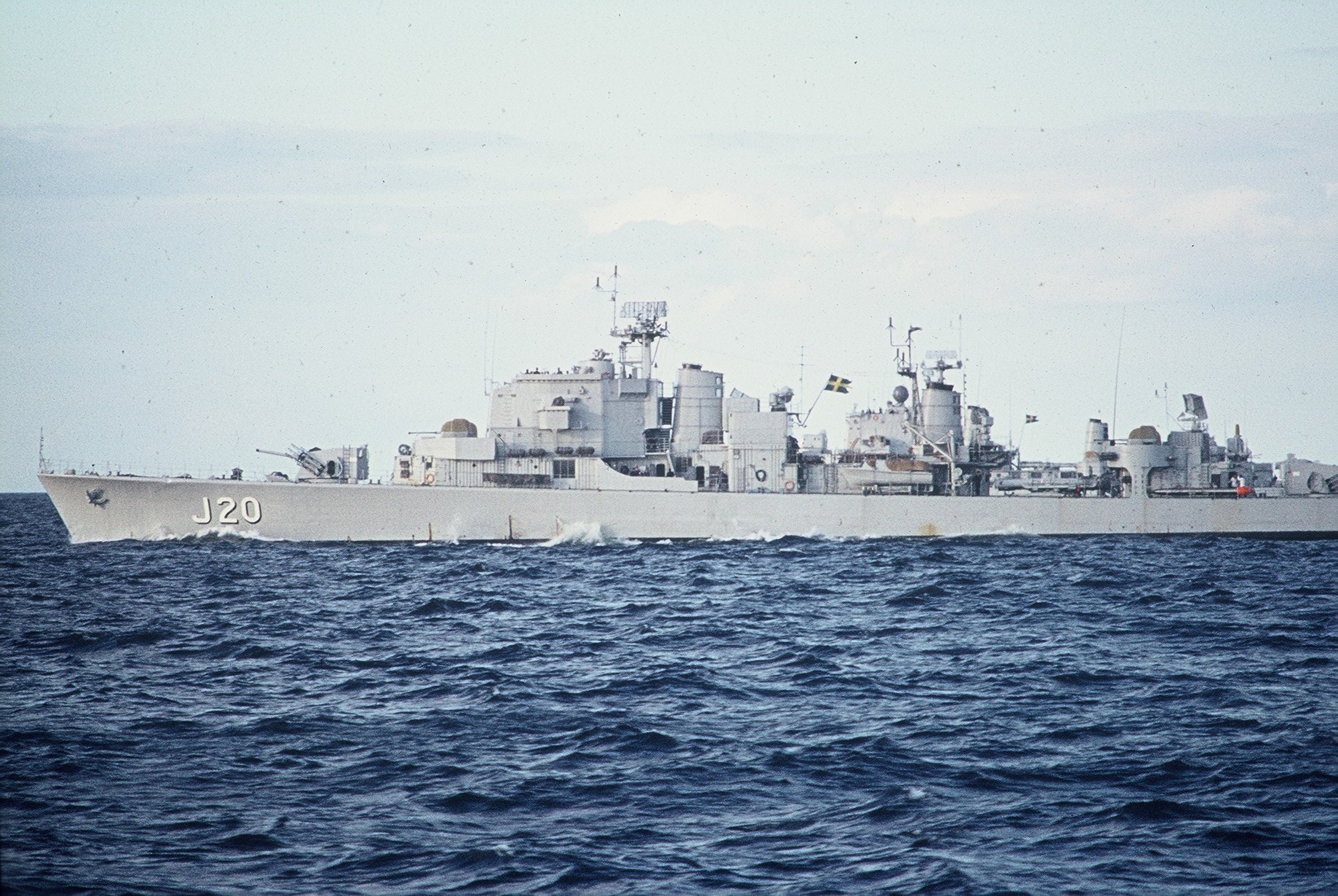
HSwMS Östergötland

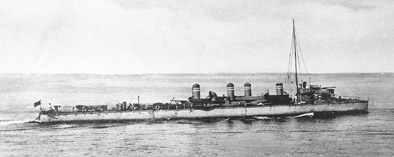
HSwMS Mode

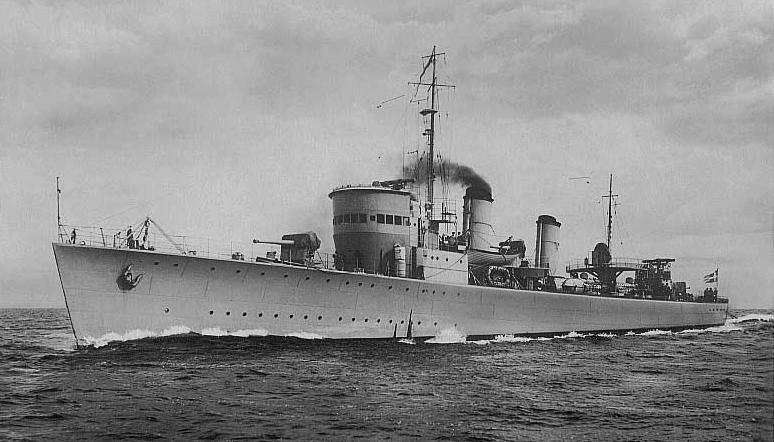
HSwMS Ehrensköld

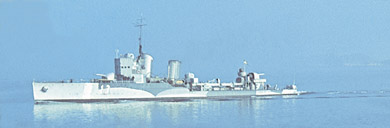
HSwMS Psilander

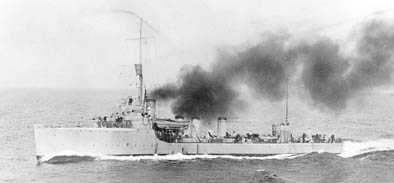
HSwMS Wachtmeister

Number	Name	Commissioned	Class	Fate
1 (Note: Never wore the hull number)	Mode	1902	No specific class	Decommissioned in 1928. Used as artillery target in 1936.
2	Magne	1905	No specific class	Decommissioned in 1936
3	Klas Horn	1932/1943	Klas	Decommissioned in 1941, again in 1958
3	Wale	1908	No specific class	Decommissioned in 1940. Used as target ship and sank on 26 September 1946.
4	Klas Uggla	1932	Klas	Sunk in an accident in 1941
4 (Note: Later wore number 23)	Vidar	1910	Ragnar	Decommissioned in 1947
5 (Note: Later wore number 22)	Ragnar	1909	Ragnar	Decommissioned in 1947
6 (Note: Later wore number 21)	Sigurd	1909	Ragnar	Decommissioned in 1947
7 (Note: Later wore number 24)	Hugin	1911	Hugin	Decommissioned in 1947
8	Munin	1913	Hugin	Decommissioned in 1940
9 (Note: Later wore number 25)	Wrangel	1918	Wrangel	Decommissioned in 1947. Used as target ship and sank 1960.
10 (Note: Later wore number 26)	Wachtmeister	1918	Wrangel	Decommissioned in 1947
11 (Note: Later wore number 1, 71 as a destroyer escort)	Ehrensköld	1927	Ehrensköld	Decommissioned in 1963
12 (Note: Later wore number 2, 72 as a destroyer escort)	Nordenskjöld	1926	Ehrensköld	Decommissioned in 1963
18	Psilander	1940	Psilander	Decommissioned in 1947
19	Puke	1940	Psilander	Decommissioned in 1947
27 (Note: Number 77 as a destroyer escort (uncertain if she wore this number))	Romulus	1940	Romulus	Decommissioned in 1958
28 (Note: Number 78 as a destroyer escort (uncertain if she wore this number))	Remus	1940	Romulus	Decommissioned in 1958
29 (Note: Later wore number 73 as a destroyer escort)	Mode	1942	Mode	Decommissioned in 1970
30 (Note: Later wore number 74 as a destroyer escort)	Magne	1942	Mode	Decommissioned in 1966
31 (Note: Later wore number 75 as a destroyer escort)	Munin	1943	Mode	Decommissioned in 1968
32 (Note: Later wore number 76 as a destroyer escort)	Mjölner	1942	Mode	Decommissioned in 1966
J5	Göteborg	1936/1943	Göteborg	Decommissioned in 1941, again in 1958. Used as target ship in 1962.
J6	Stockholm	1937	Göteborg	Decommissioned in 1964
J7	Malmö	1939	Göteborg	Decommissioned in 1964
J8	Karlskrona	1940	Göteborg	Decommissioned in 1974. Later used as target ship.
J9	Gävle	1941	Göteborg	Decommissioned in 1968
J10	Norrköping	1941	Göteborg	Decommissioned in 1965. Later used as target ship.
J11	Visby	1943	Visby	Decommissioned in 1982
J12	Sundsvall	1943	Visby	Decommissioned in 1982
J13	Hälsingborg	1943	Visby	Decommissioned in 1978
J14	Kalmar	1944	Visby	Decommissioned in 1978
J16	Öland	1947	Öland	Decommissioned in 1978
J17	Uppland	1947	Öland	Decommissioned in 1979
J18	Halland	1955	Halland	Decommissioned in 1985
J19	Småland	1956	Halland	Decommissioned in 1984. Now a museum ship in Gothenburg.
J20	Östergötland	1958	Östergötland	Decommissioned in 1982. Sold to Spain in 1985 for scrapping.
J21	Södermanland	1958	Östergötland	Decommissioned in 1982. Sold to England in 1991 for scrapping.
J22	Gästrikland	1959	Östergötland	Decommissioned in 1982
J23	Hälsingland	1959	Östergötland	Decommissioned in 1982
J24	Lappland	Cancelled in 1958	Halland	Cancelled
J25	Värmland	Cancelled in 1958	Halland	Cancelled
