= Wrangel (disambiguation) =

Wrangel is a Germanic surname.

Wrangel or Wrangell may also refer to:

== Places ==
- Wrangel Island, a Russian island in the Arctic Ocean
- Wrangell Island, Alaska
  - Wrangell, Alaska
  - Wrangell Airport
  - Fort Wrangel
- Wrangell Mountains, Alaska
  - Mount Wrangell

== Ships ==
- Wrangel-class destroyer, ships built during World War I
- HSwMS Wrangel, several ships of the Swedish Navy
- USS Wrangell, an American ship launched in 1944

== Other ==
- Wrangel family, a Baltic German noble family

== See also ==
- Wrangle (disambiguation)
- Wrangler (disambiguation)
- Rangel (disambiguation)
- Rangle, stones fed to hawks to aid in digestion
