= Witt (surname) =

Witt is a surname. Notable people with the surname include:

- Alex Witt (born 1961), American news anchor
- Alexander Witt (born 1952), Chilean-American filmmaker
- Alicia Witt (born 1975), American actress
- Bob Witt, vaudeville performer and the "Witt" in the group Witt and Berg
- Bobby Witt Jr. (born 2000), American baseball player
- Bobby Witt Sr. (born 1964), American baseball player, father of Bobby Jr.
- Brendan Witt (born 1975), American football player
- Carl Gustav Witt (1866–1946), German astronomer
- Christian Friedrich Witt (1660s–1716), German baroque composer
- Ernst Witt (1911–1991), German mathematician
- Franz Xaver Witt (1834–1888), German composer of Cecilian music
- Friedrich Witt (1770–1836), German composer (not to be confused with Christian Friedrich above)
- Fritz Witt (1908–1944), German Waffen-SS general
- George Witt (baseball) (1933–2013), American baseball player
- George Witt (collector) (1804–1869), doctor, banker and mayor known for his collection of erotic objects
- George Witt (politician) (1863–1925), American politician in the state of Washington
- Holly Witt (born 1968), American model and actress
- Howard Witt (1932–2017), American actor
- Jake Witt (born 2000), American football player
- James Lee Witt (born 1944), American director of FEMA
- Joachim Witt (born 1949), German musician
- Josef Witt (1901–1994), Austrian operatic tenor
- Katarina Witt (born 1965), German figure skater
- Liza Witt, Australian singer and actress
- Louie Steven Witt, witness to the Kennedy assassination, known as Umbrella man
- Marcos Witt (born 1962), American Christian composer
- Michael Witt (born 1984), Australian rugby league player
- Mike Witt (born 1960), American baseball player
- Nathan Witt (1903–1982), American labor lawyer
- Otto Witt (1875–1923), Swedish author
- Paul Junger Witt (1941–2018), American film and television producer
- Robert Witt (disambiguation), several people
- Roz Witt, American television and film actress
- Sam Witt (born 1970), American poet
- Stephen Witt (active 2025), American writer
- Ulrich Witt (born 1946), German economist
- Uwe Witt (born 1959), German politician
- Vicki Witt, American model
- Wastl Witt (1882–1955), German actor
- Whitey Witt (1895–1988), American baseball player
