= HSwMS Hugin =

HSwMS Hugin is the name of the following ships of the Swedish Navy:

- HSwMS Hugin (1884), a 2.-class torpedo boat
- HSwMS Hugin (1910), a Hugin-class destroyer scrapped in 1949
- HSwMS Hugin (P151), a patrol boat, now a museum ship at Maritiman

== See also ==
- Hugin (disambiguation)
