= HSwMS Mode (1902) =

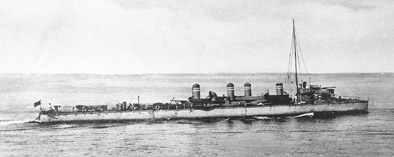
- Mode

History

Sweden
- Name: Mode
- Builder: Yarrow, Poplar
- Launched: 22 July 1902
- Stricken: 1928
- Fate: Sunk as target, 1936

General characteristics
- Displacement: 394 long tons (400 t)
- Length: 67.08 m (220 ft 1 in)
- Beam: 6.20 m (20 ft 4 in)
- Draught: 2.67 m (8 ft 9 in)
- Installed power: 4 × Yarrow boilers; 6,000 ihp (4,474 kW)
- Propulsion: 2 shafts; 2 triple expansion engines
- Speed: 29 knots (54 km/h; 33 mph)
- Complement: 62
- Armament: 6 × single 57 mm (2.2 in) guns; 2 × single 450 mm (17.7 in) torpedo tubes

HSwMS Mode (Note: "HSwMS" here stands for "Hans/Hennes Majestäts Skepp" - The prefix "HMS" is used in Sweden - the prefix "HSwMS" is used in international contexts to avoid confusion with ships of the British Royal Navy.) was a torpedo boat destroyer of the Royal Swedish Navy. Mode was built by the British shipbuilder Yarrow, launching in 1902, and was the first destroyer built for Sweden. She was employed on escort duties during the First World War and was sunk as a target in 1936.

== Design ==
In 1899, the Swedish Navy Board began negotiations with British shipyards, including Yarrow, Thornycroft and Beardmores, for its first destroyer, which was planned to become a template for Swedish production. Shortages of funds prevented an order from being placed in 1900. Still, in August 1901, Sweden accepted an offer from Yarrow to build a single destroyer, with Yarrow quoting a price of £48,000 compared to £52,250 from Thornycroft. A contract to build the destroyer, to be called Mode, was signed on 4 October 1901, specifying a price of £48,300. The destroyer was required to reach a speed of 31 knots (57 km/h; 36 mph) during sea trials, with financial bonuses for exceeding this speed and penalties for failing to reach the required speed, with the Swedes able to reject the ship if it could not reach a speed of 30 knots (56 km/h; 35 mph).

Mode was 67.08 m (220 ft 1 in) long overall with a beam of 6.20 m (20 ft 4 in) and a draught of 2.67 m (8 ft 9 in). Displacement was 394 long tons (400 t) normal, and 453 long tons (460 t) full load. The ship had an arched turtleback (Note: A fore deck with exaggerated camber designed to throw off sea water at high speeds.) forecastle and four funnels. Four Yarrow boilers (two coal-fired and two with provision for mixed (coal and oil) firing) fed steam at 250 psi (1,700 kPa) to 2 four-cylinder triple expansion steam engines, rated at 6,000 indicated horsepower (4,500 kW), that drove two shafts. Armament consisted of six 57 mm (2.2 in) QF guns, with two 450 mm (17.7-inch) torpedo tubes mounted aft. The ship had a crew of 62, comprising 4 officers, 13 non-commissioned officers and 45 ratings.

== Service ==
Mode was built by Yarrow at their Poplar, London yard, as yard number 1118, and was launched on 22 July 1902. During sea trials in August 1902, Mode reached a speed of 32.4 knots (60.0 km/h; 37.3 mph), making her briefly the world's fastest ship. For the trials, a specially trained team of engineers and stokers were provided by Yarrow, while fuel was high grade coal and some oil. No armament was fitted, but the ship carried the equivalent weight in ballast. (Note: The shallow waters of the measured mile used, off the Maplin Sands, also contributed to the high speed recorded in the trials. The British Admiralty later discounted trials made on this course because of the effects on the measured speed.) After acceptance and delivery to Karlskrona, Mode's armament was fitted. When the trials were then repeated by the Swedes, the ship could only reach 29 knots (54 km/h; 33 mph), although this still made her the fastest ship in the Swedish Navy by a considerable margin. The Yarrow hull design proved to be poorly suited to sea conditions in the Baltic Sea, and Mode was very wet forward. Sweden purchased a second destroyer, the Magne, from Thornycroft in 1904, and this proved to have better seakeeping. The design of Magne was chosen as the basis for production in Sweden, with four destroyers (Wale and the Ragnar class) built between 1907 and 1909 based on this design.

In June 1905, Mode was deployed with Magne to the West coast of Sweden during the crisis that preceded the dissolution of the Union between Sweden and Norway. During the First World War, Mode was employed escorting convoys of merchant ships from ports in the Northeast of Sweden to Øresund and the Kattegat. She remained in commission until 1919, was stricken in 1928 and sunk as a target in 1936. (Note: Harris claims that Mode was sunk as a target in 1928.)

== Bibliography ==
- Chesneau, Roger; Kolesnik, Eugene M., eds. (1979). Conway's All the World's Fighting Ships 1860–1905. London: Conway Maritime Press. ISBN 0-85177-133-5.
- Gardiner, Robert; Gray, Randal, eds. (1985). Conway's All The World's Fighting Ships 1906–1921. London: Conway Maritime Press. ISBN 0-85177-245-5.
- Gardiner, Robert; Lambert, Andrew, eds. (1992). Steam, Steel & Shellfire: The Steam Warship 1815–1905. Conway's History of the Ship. London: Conway Maritime Press. ISBN 0-85177-564-0.
- Harris, Daniel (2000). "Swedish Steam Torpedo Boats". In Preston, Antony (ed.). Warship 2000–2001. Conway Maritime Press. pp. 97–124. ISBN 0-85177-791-0.
- Palmstierna, C. (1972). "Swedish Torpedo Boats & Destroyers: Part II - Destroyers". Warship International. Vol. IX, no. 1. pp. 59–77.
