= Hugin =

Hugin may refer to:

- Huginn, a raven in Norse Mythology, see Huginn and Muninn
  - Hugin-class destroyer, a Royal Swedish Navy class of destroyers named after mythological raven
  - HSwMS Hugin, several ships of the Swedish Navy
  - Hugin (longship), a Danish reconstruction of a Viking longship on display in Ramsgate, England, named after the mythological raven
  - HUGIN, an autonomous underwater vehicle developed by Kongsberg Maritime and the Norwegian Defence Research Establishment (FFI), named after the mythological raven
- Hugin (software), an image editing program that creates panoramas and high dynamic range imaging (HDR) images from multiple images, open source, cross platform
- Bob Hugin (born 1954), American politician and businessman
- HUGIN, a widely used tool for uncertain reasoning using Bayesian networks
- Hugin (magazine), a 1916–1920 publication by Otto Witt
