= Robert Witt =

Robert Witt, or variants, may refer to:

== People ==
- Sir Robert Witt (art historian) (1872–1952), British art historian
- Robert Witt (academic administrator) (born 1940), chancellor of the University of Alabama System
- Robert William Witt (1930–1967), neoclassical and experimental composer
- Bobby Witt (Robert Andrew Witt Sr, born 1964), American baseball pitcher
- Bobby Witt Jr. (Robert Andrew Witt Jr, born 2000), American baseball shortstop
- Bob Witt, vaudeville performer and a member of the group Witt and Berg

== Fictional character ==
- Pvt. Robert E. Lee Witt, a character from The Thin Red Line (1998 film)

== See also ==
- Witt (surname)
