= Wrangler =

Wrangler may refer to:

- Wrangler (profession), a handler of animals, especially horses and cattle, or a professional who searches for and/or handles animals (or other products) for film productions
- Jeep Wrangler, a type of motor vehicle
- Goodyear Wrangler, a commercial line (family) of automotive tires for SUVs / 4x4s
- Wrangler (jeans), a brand of jeans
- Ruger Wrangler, a single-action rimfire revolver
- Wrangler (TV series), a 1960 Western program starring Jason Evers
- Wrangler (University of Cambridge), a student who has completed the final year of the mathematical tripos with first-class honours
  - Senior Wrangler, mathematics student graduating top of their class at the University of Cambridge
- Wrangler: Anatomy of an Icon, a documentary about Jack Wrangler
- Data wrangler, a professional in computing who transforms raw data to a clean format
- Wrangler (band), an electronica musical band founded by Stephen Mallinder
- "Wranglers" (song), a 2024 single by Miranda Lambert
- The Wranglers (TV series), a 2024 TV series

== Sports ==
- Arizona Wranglers, a former USFL football team
- Austin Wranglers, an arena football team
- Calgary Wranglers, the AHL minor league affiliate of the Calgary Flames hockey team
- Las Vegas Wranglers, an ice hockey team in the ECHL
- Luray Wranglers, a summer baseball team in rural Virginia
- Wichita Wranglers, a minor league baseball team in the Texas League

== People with the surname ==
- Jack Wrangler (1946-2009), American actor

== See also ==
- Henry II, Duke of Bavaria or Henry the Wrangler (951-995)
- The Senior Wrangler, a member of the faculty of Unseen University in Terry Pratchett's Discworld series of novels
- "Wrangler Jane" Thrift, a character on the TV series F Troop
- Render wrangler, a systems engineer in charge of a render farm
- Tape Wrangler, a tape-dispensing product
- Wrangle (disambiguation)
- Wrangel (disambiguation)
- Rangel (disambiguation)
- Rangle, a falconry term
