= HSwMS Wachtmeister (10) =

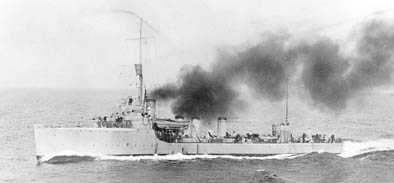
- Wachtmeister at sea

History

Sweden
- Name: Wachtmeister
- Namesake: Wachtmeister noble family
- Builder: Lindholmens, Gothenburg
- Launched: 19 December 1917
- Completed: 19 October 1918
- Out of service: 13 June 1947
- Identification: Pennant number: 10, later 26
- Fate: Sold for scrap, 1950

General characteristics
- Class & type: Wrangel-class destroyer
- Displacement: 415 t (408 long tons) standard; 498 t (490 long tons) full load
- Length: 69.6 m (228 ft 4 in)
- Beam: 6.9 m (22 ft 8 in)
- Draught: 2.8 m (9 ft 2 in)
- Installed power: 4 Yarrow boilers; 11,000 shp (8,200 kW)
- Propulsion: 2 screws; 2 geared steam turbines
- Speed: 34 knots (63 km/h; 39 mph)
- Complement: 81
- Armament: 4 × single 75 mm (3 in) guns; 1 × single 25 mm (1 in) gun; 2 × twin, 2 × single 457 mm (18 in) torpedo tubes

HSwMS Wachtmeister was the second and last of the Wrangel-class destroyers built for the Royal Swedish Navy during World War I. Completed in 1918, the ship was rammed by another Swedish destroyer four years later. At the beginning of World War II in 1939 she was assigned to the Gothenburg Squadron. Wachtmeister was decommissioned in 1947 and was subsequently sold for scrap in 1950.

== Background and description ==
The Wrangel class ships were improved versions of the preceding Hugin class and were the first Swedish destroyers to use single-reduction geared turbines. The Wrangel class had a standard displacement of 415 tonnes (408 long tons) and 498 t (490 long tons) at full load. The destroyers measured 69.6 metres (228 ft 4 in) long at the waterline and 72.0 m (236 ft 3 in) overall with a beam of 6.9 m (22 ft 8 in) and a mean draught of 2.8 m (9 ft 2 in). (Note: Whitley has the ships with a standard displacement of 472 t (465 long tons), an overall length of 70.9 m (232 ft 7 in) and a beam of 6.7 m (22 ft).)

The Wrangels were powered by a pair of de Laval geared steam turbines, each driving one propeller shaft using steam provided by four coal-fired Yarrow boilers. The turbines were designed to produce a total of 11,000 shaft horsepower (8,200 kW), but actually produced 13,000 shp (9,700 kW) that gave them a maximum speed of 34 knots (63 km/h; 39 mph). The ships carried 105 t (103 long tons; 116 short tons) of coal. The destroyers had a complement of 81 officers and ratings.

The destroyers were armed with four 75-millimetre (3 in) m/12 guns in single mounts. One gun was situated fore and aft of the superstructure and the other two were on the broadside amidships. They also mounted two 6.5 mm (0.26 in) M1914 machine guns. The torpedo armament of the Wrangel-class destroyers consisted of 457 mm (18 in) torpedoes fired from two twin-tube mounts located on the centreline aft of the funnels and one single tube on each broadside between the second and third funnels.

=== Modifications ===
The boilers of the Wrangels were converted to use fuel oil in 1927. They were rearmed in 1940, adding one Bofors 25 mm (1 in) M32 anti-aircraft gun and two 8 mm (0.31 in) M36 machine guns that replaced the 6.5 mm weapons while having their two single torpedo-tube mounts removed. In addition, two depth charge racks were added with 16 M/24 depth charges. This increased their standard displacement to 498 t (490 long tons).

== Construction and career ==
Wachtmeister, named after the Wachtmeister noble family, was authorized in 1914 and was launched on 19 December 1917 by the Lindholmens Shipyard in Gothenburg. After fitting out and trials she was commissioned on 19 October 1918.

During an exercise on the evening of 8 June 1922, Wachtmeister was rammed just forward of the bridge by the destroyer HSwMS Vidar. Three men aboard Vidar were seriously injured; one later died during transport to the hospital. 20 m (66 ft) of Wachtmeister's hull was damaged; three men were knocked into the water, but were quickly rescued. Vidar had to be towed into Bergkvara while Wachtmeister reached Karlskrona under her own power. Both destroyers were repaired and returned to service the following year.

From 28 June to 2 July 1923, Wachtmeister and her sister ship Wrangel escorted the three Sverige-class coastal defence ships from Karlskrona to Sheerness, England to celebrate the engagement of Crown Prince Gustav Adolf to Lady Louise Mountbatten. A few days later, the squadron proceeded to Rosyth, Scotland, where they were hosted by the British Atlantic Fleet before returning to Sweden.

On 24 August 1930, the coastal defense ship Manligheten ran aground while sailing between Stockholm and Horsfjärden in poor weather. Despite efforts by the minelayer Clas Fleming and coastal battleship Drottning Victoria, the vessel could not be towed off. Wachtmeister, by sailing past at full speed over and over again, succeeded in freeing the ship using her bow wave.

=== World War II ===
At the beginning of World War II, Wachtmeister was assigned to the Gothenburg Squadron. During the winter of 1940–1941, the ship was re-boilered, but by late autumn 1943, she was put into material reserve in Stockholm. Wachtmeister was stricken from the navy list on 13 June 1947 and she was sold for scrap in 1950 to a company in Karlstad.

== Bibliography ==
- Borgenstam, Curt; Insulander, Per & Kaudern, Gösta (1989). Jagare: med Svenska flottans jagare under 80 år [Destroyers: Swedish Navy Destroyers under 80 years] (in Swedish). Västra Frölunda: Marinlitteratur. ISBN 91-970700-4-1. SELIBR 7792227.
- von Hofsten, Gustaf; Waernberg, Jan & Ohlsson, Curt S. (2003). Örlogsfartyg: svenska maskindrivna fartyg under tretungad flagg [Ships of War: Swedish Machine-powered Ships under the Triple-tailed Flag]. [Forum navales skriftserie], 1650-1837; [6] (in Swedish). Stockholm: Svenskt militärhistoriskt bibl. i samarbete med Marinlitteratur. ISBN 919743843X. SELIBR 8873330.
- Insulander, Per & Ohlsson, Curt S (2001). Pansarskepp - Från John Ericsson till Gustav V [Armoured ships from John Ericsson to Gustav V] (in Swedish). Falkenberg: C B Marinlitteratur AB. ISBN 978-9-19731-872-3.
- Lagvall, Bertil (1991). Flottans neutralitetsvakt 1939-1945: krönika [Chronicle of the Fleet Neutrality Watch 1939-1945]. Marinlitteraturföreningen, 0348-2405; 71 (in Swedish). Stockholm: Marinlitteraturfören. ISBN 91-85944-05-X. SELIBR 7753511.
- Steckzén, Birger, ed. (1949). Klart skepp: en bok om Sverigeskeppen Sverige, Gustaf V, Drottning Victoria [Clear Ship: A Book about the Ships Svierge, Gustaf V, Drottning Victoria] (in Swedish). Stockholm: Norstedt. SELIBR 1417624.
- Westerlund, Karl-Eric (1985). "Sweden". In Gray, Randal (ed.). Conway's All the World's Fighting Ships 1906–1921. London: Conway Maritime Press. pp. 355–363. ISBN 978-0-85177-245-5.
- Whitley, M. J. (2000). Destroyers of World War Two: An International Encyclopedia. London: Cassell & Co. ISBN 1-85409-521-8.
