= HSwMS Munin (1911) =

History

Sweden
- Name: Munin
- Namesake: Munin
- Builder: Kockums, Malmö
- Launched: 5 December 1911
- Commissioned: 10 January 1913
- Stricken: 18 October 1940
- Identification: Pennant number: 8
- Fate: Scrapped about 1943

General characteristics (as built)
- Class & type: Hugin-class destroyer
- Displacement: 350 long tons (356 t) (normal); 420 long tons (427 t) (deep load)
- Length: 66.3 m (217 ft 6 in)
- Beam: 6.5 m (21 ft 4 in)
- Draft: 1.8 m (5 ft 11 in) (deep load)
- Installed power: 4 water-tube boilers; 10,000 shp (7,500 kW)
- Propulsion: 2 shafts; 2 steam turbines
- Speed: 30 knots (56 km/h; 35 mph)
- Range: 1,500 nmi (2,800 km; 1,700 mi) at 16 knots (30 km/h; 18 mph)
- Complement: 73
- Armament: 4 × single 75 mm (3 in) guns; 2 × single 45 cm (17.7 in) torpedo tubes

Munin was a Hugin-class destroyer built for the Royal Swedish Navy during the 1910s. Completed in 1913, she conducted neutrality patrols during both World Wars.

== Design and description ==
The Hugin-class ships were improved versions of the earlier Ragnar class and were the first Swedish warships built with steam turbines. The ships displaced 350 long tons (360 t) at normal load and 429 long tons (436 t) at full load. The destroyers measured 65.8 metres (215 ft 11 in) long at the waterline and 66.3 m (217 ft 6 in) overall with a beam of 6.5 m (21 ft 4 in) and a draught of 1.8 m (5 ft 11 in) at normal load. The Hugins were powered by a pair of AEG-Curtiss direct-drive steam turbines, each driving one propeller shaft using steam provided by four coal-fired Yarrow boilers. The turbines were designed to produce a total of 10,000 shaft horsepower (7,500 kW) for a maximum speed of 30 knots (56 km/h; 35 mph). Munin handily exceeded her designed speed reaching 33.5 knots (62.0 km/h; 38.6 mph). They carried enough coal to give them a range of 1,500 nautical miles (2,800 km; 1,700 mi) at a speed of 16 knots (30 km/h; 18 mph). The ships had a complement of 73 officers and ratings.

The Hugin class was armed with four 75-millimetre (3 in) m/05 guns in single mounts. One gun was situated on the forward superstructure and another on the stern; the other two were on the broadside amidships. The ships were also armed with two 457 mm (18 in) torpedo tubes on single mounts located on the centreline between the stern gun and the rear funnel.

=== Modifications ===
The ships exchanged their single torpedo-tube mounts for twin-tube mounts in 1916 and Munin had her bridge elevated four years later. Both ships replaced their stern gun with a pair of twin-gun mounts for 25 mm (0.98 in) Bofors anti-aircraft guns in 1939. They also had a pair of depth charge racks added at the stern.

== Construction and career ==
Munin was launched on 5 December 1911 by Kockums Mekaniska Verkstad at its shipyard in Malmö. The ship was commissioned on 10 January 1913. The ship conducted neutrality patrols during both World Wars. Munin was decommissioned on 18 October 1940.

== Citations ==
=== Bibliography ===
- Borgenstam, Curt; Insulander, Per & Kaudern, Gösta (1989). Jagare: med Svenska flottans jagare under 80 år [Destroyers: Swedish Navy Destroyers under 80 Years] (in Swedish). Marinlitteratur. ISBN 91-970700-4-1. SELIBR 7792227.
- von Hofsten, Gustaf; Waernberg, Jan & Ohlsson, Curt S. (2003). Örlogsfartyg: svenska maskindrivna fartyg under tretungad flagg [Ships of War: Swedish Machine-powered Ships under the Triple-tailed Flag]. [Forum navales skriftserie], 1650-1837; [6] (in Swedish). Stockholm: Svenskt militärhistoriskt bibl. i samarbete med Marinlitteratur. ISBN 919743843X. SELIBR 8873330.
- Westerlund, Karl-Erik (1985). "Sweden". In Gray, Randal (ed.). Conway's All the World's Fighting Ships 1906–1921. Conway Maritime Press. pp. 355–363. ISBN 978-0-85177-245-5.
- Westerlund, Karl-Eric (1980). "Sweden". In Chesneau, Roger (ed.). Conway's All the World's Fighting Ships 1922–1946. Mayflower Books. pp. 368–377. ISBN 0-8317-0303-2.
