= Wrangle =

Wrangle or similar may refer to:

- Wrangle, Lincolnshire, a village in England
- Wrangle, a historical name for the card game Russian Bank
- Data wrangling

== See also ==
- Wrangler (disambiguation)
- Wrangel (disambiguation)
- Rangel (disambiguation)
- Rangle, stones fed to hawks to aid in digestion
