= HSwMS Magne (1905) =

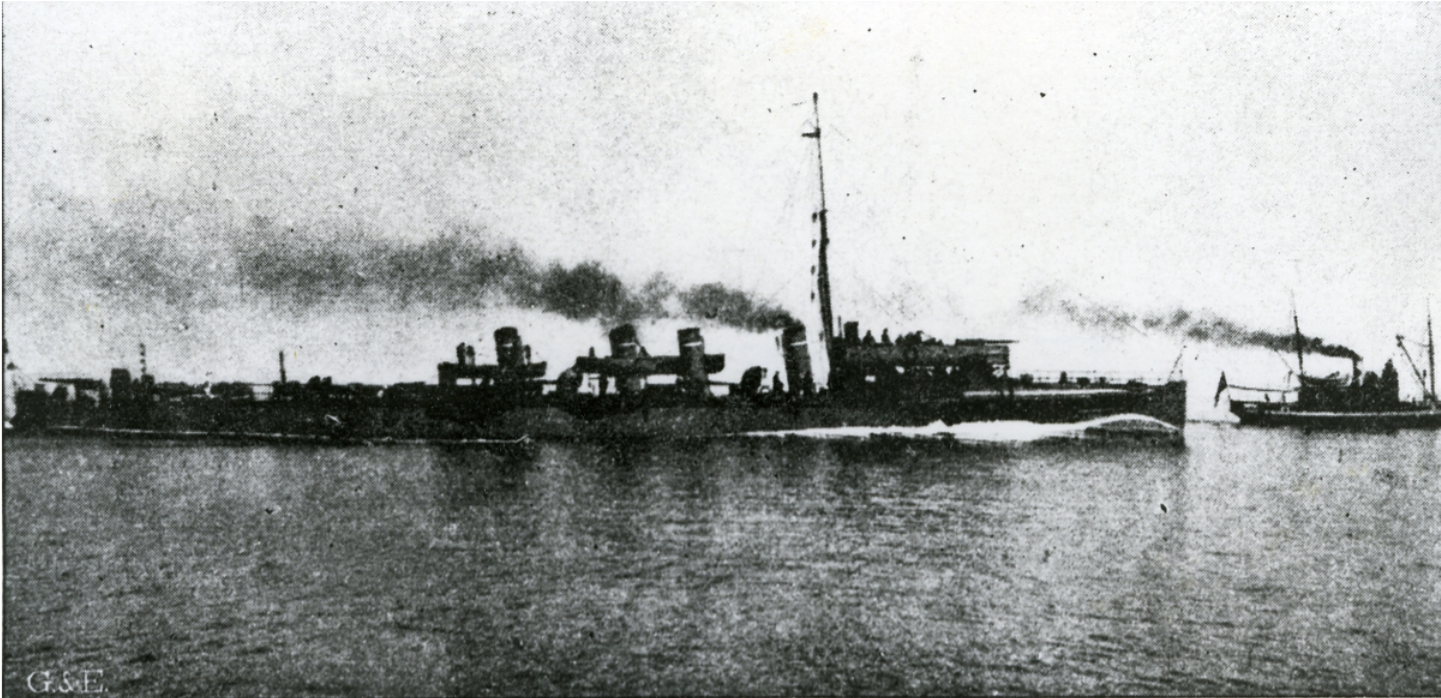
- Magne

History

Sweden
- Name: Magne
- Builder: Thornycroft, Chiswick
- Launched: 2 August 1905
- Fate: Sold for scrap, 1943

General characteristics
- Displacement: 430 long tons (437 t)
- Length: 65.78 m (215 ft 10 in)
- Beam: 6.30 m (20 ft 8 in)
- Draught: 2.49 m (8 ft 2 in)
- Installed power: 4 water-tube boilers; 7,200 ihp (5,369 kW)
- Propulsion: 2 shafts; 2 triple expansion engines
- Speed: 29 knots (54 km/h; 33 mph)
- Complement: 67
- Armament: 6 × single 57 mm (2.2 in) guns; 2 × single 450 mm (17.7-inch) torpedo tubes

HSwMS Magne (Note: "HSwMS" here stands for "Hans/Hennes Majestäts Skepp" - The prefix "HMS" is used in Sweden - the prefix "HSwMS" is used in international contexts to avoid confusion with ships of the British Royal Navy.) was a torpedo boat destroyer of the Royal Swedish Navy. Magne was built by the British shipbuilder Thornycroft, launching in 1905. She was employed on neutrality patrol and escort duties during the First World War and was sold for scrap in 1943.

== Design ==
In 1904, the Swedish Parliament authorised the Swedish Navy Board to purchase a second torpedo boat destroyer, as a follow-on to Mode, which had been built by the British shipyard Yarrow in 1902. The new destroyer, to be called Magne, and based on Thornycroft's Shirakumo-class built for Japan, was ordered from Yarrow's British rival Thornycroft in July 1904, for a price of £50,000.

Magne was 65.78 m (215 ft 10 in) long at the waterline, with a beam of 6.30 m (20 ft 8 in) and a draught of 2.49 m (8 ft 2 in). Displacement was 430 long tons (440 t) full load. Like Mode, Magne had a turtleback (Note: A fore deck with exaggerated camber designed to throw off sea water at high speeds.) forecastle, although Magne's turtleback was longer, and four funnels. Four coal-fed Thornycroft-Schutz water-tube boilers supplied steam at 240 psi (1,700 kPa) to 2 triple expansion steam engines, rated at 7,200 ihp (5,400 kW), that drove two shafts. Contract speed was 30.5 kn (35.1 mph; 56.5 km/h) at full load. Armament consisted of six 57 mm (2.2 in) QF guns, with two 450 mm (17.7-inch) torpedo tubes mounted aft. Crew was 67 officers and ratings.

== Construction and service ==
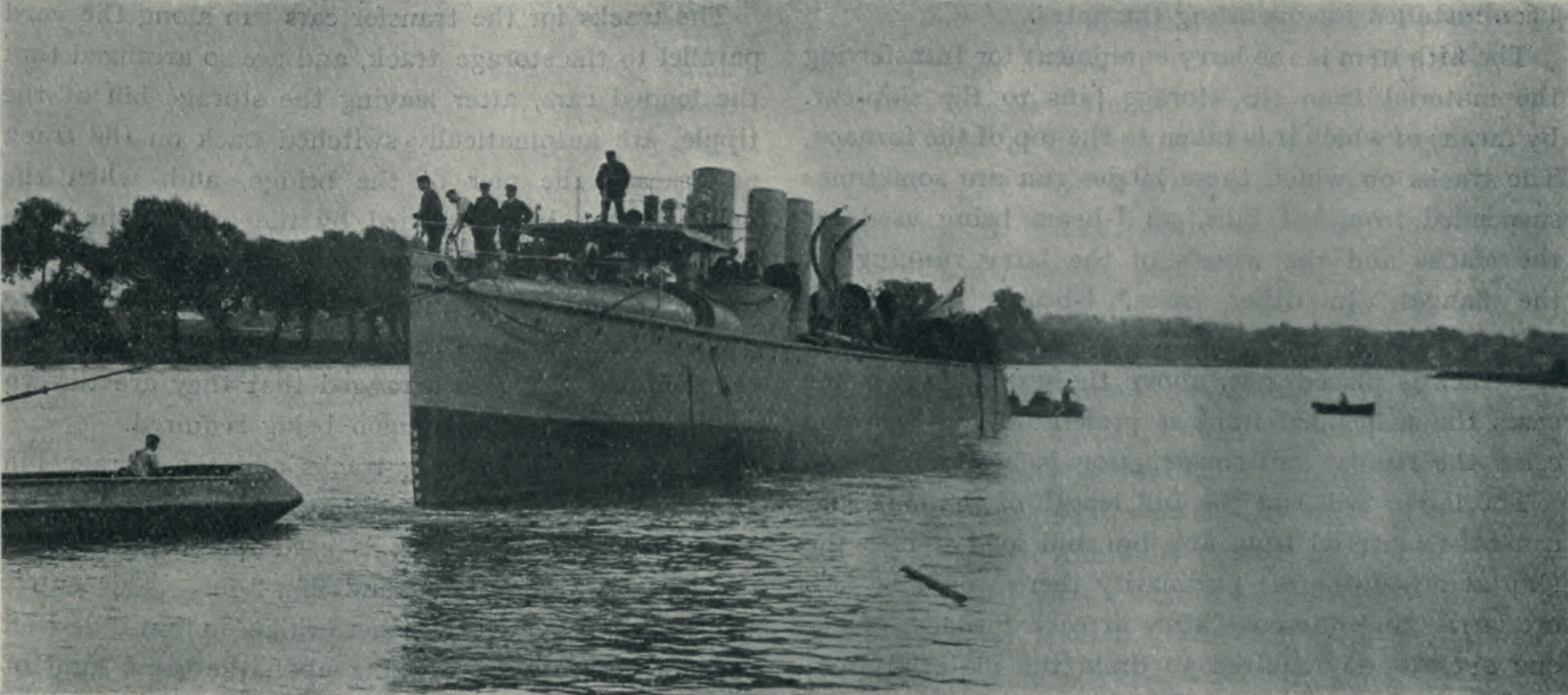
Magne before delivery

Magne was built by Thornycroft at their Chiswick, London yard, as yard number 378, and was launched on 2 August 1905. She reached a speed of 30.713 kn (35.344 mph; 56.880 km/h) during acceptance sea trials, before delivery to Sweden to have her armament fitted. She proved to have better seakeeping than Mode, being much drier, although like Mode made no more than 29 kn (33 mph; 54 km/h) in Swedish service. Magne formed the basis of the design for Sweden's next four destroyers, Wale and the three Ragnar-class), which were built between 1907 and 1909 in Swedish shipyards.

After arming, Magne was deployed with Mode to the West coast of Sweden during the crisis that preceded the dissolution of the Union between Sweden and Norway. During the First World War, Magne was used to patrol neutral Sweden's waters and for escort duties, and in 1916 forced the Russian submarine Alligator out of Swedish waters near Gotland.

Magne was laid up at the end of 1918, and was stricken in 1936. She was then used as a target before being sold for scrap in 1943.

== Bibliography ==
- Chesneau, Roger; Kolesnik, Eugene M., eds. (1979). Conway's All the World's Fighting Ships 1860–1905. London: Conway Maritime Press. ISBN 0-85177-133-5.
- Gardiner, Robert; Gray, Randal, eds. (1985). Conway's All The World's Fighting Ships 1906–1921. London: Conway Maritime Press. ISBN 0-85177-245-5.
- Gardiner, Robert; Lambert, Andrew, eds. (1992). Steam, Steel & Shellfire: The Steam Warship 1815–1905. Conway's History of the Ship. London: Conway Maritime Press. ISBN 0-85177-564-0.
- Harris, Daniel (2000). "Swedish Steam Torpedo Boats". In Preston, Antony (ed.). Warship 2000–2001. London: Conway Maritime Press. pp. 97–124. ISBN 0-85177-791-0.
- Palmstierna, C. (1972). "Swedish Torpedo Boats & Destroyers: Part II - Destroyers". Warship International. Vol. IX, no. 1. pp. 59–77.
