= Ukrainian Skycutter =

Breed of pigeon

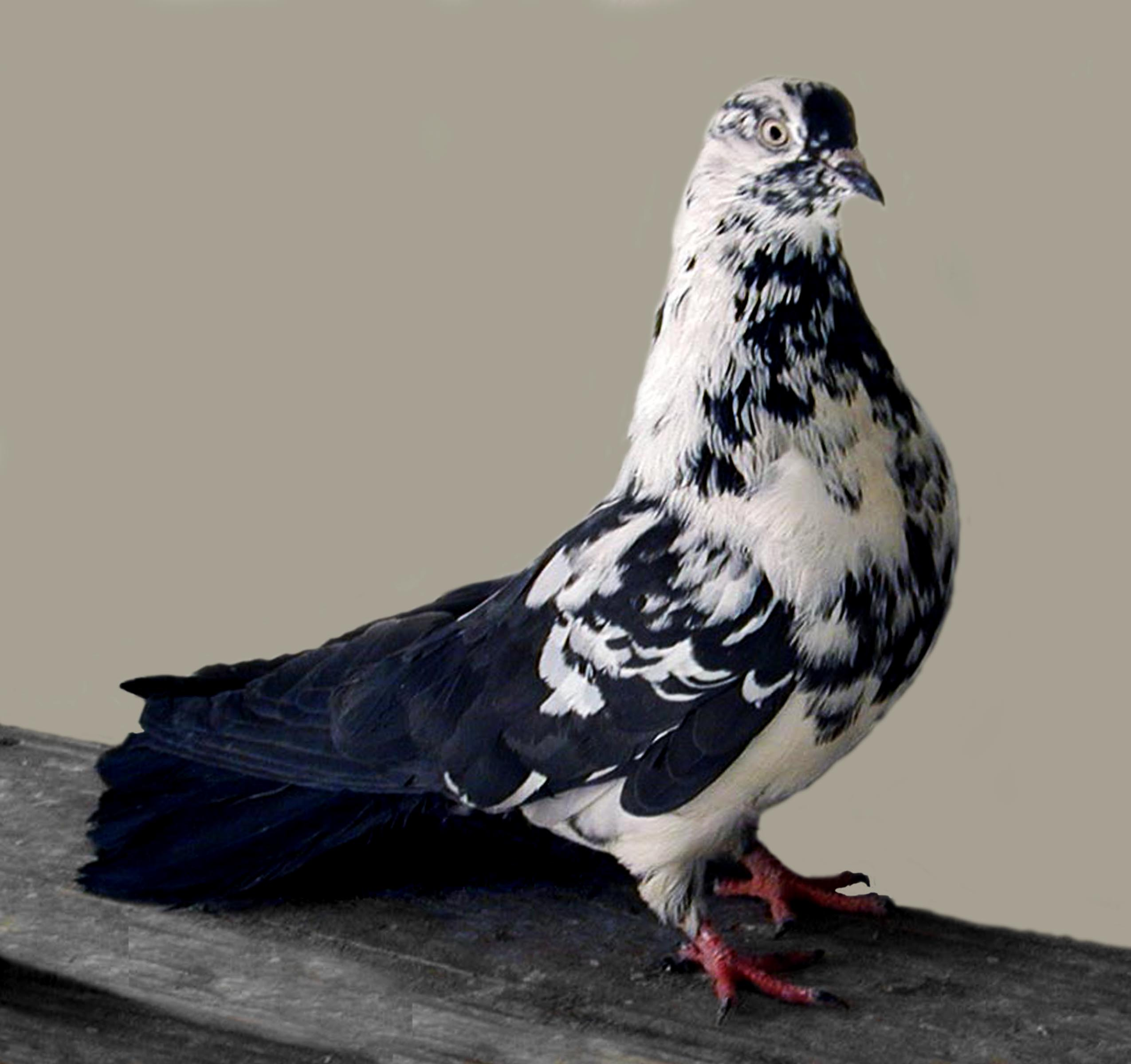

The Ukrainian Skycutter is a breed of pigeon (also known as Polish Orlik or Lublin Orlik) that has been developed for high flying. It is a variety of domesticated rock dove (Columba livia). This breed of high flying tippler was developed by centuries of breeding.

== History ==
This breed originates from the Crimean peninsula in Ukraine. The first documented standard for these birds was set up in Mykolaiv, a city in Southern Ukraine.

Another explanation suggests that this breed was developed by Polish pigeon raisers in interwar Poland, based on a Russian pigeon breed.

The name "Orlik" came from the breed's tendency to spread its tail like an eagle while flying - orlick is eaglet in Polish.

== Varieties ==
Ukrainian skycutters are actually different breeds of pigeons put together. Some of these breeds include nikolajevski bocatzy and nikolajevski torzovi.

== Flying ==
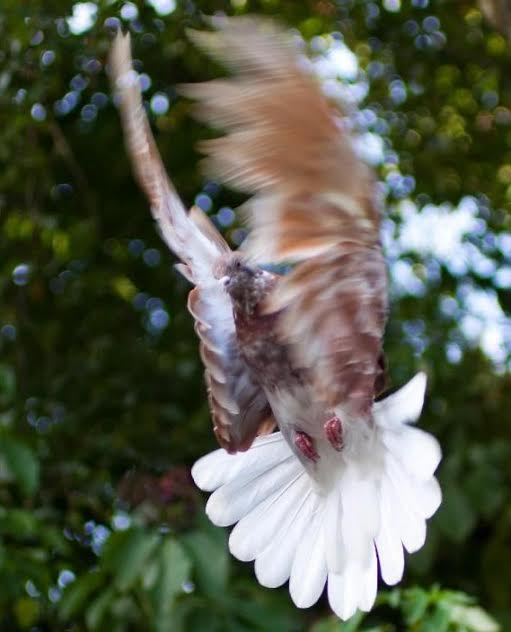
Ukrainian Skycutter

This breed of tippler can obtain altitudes of one kilometer and remain there for an extended period of time. Unlike rollers, this breed flies straight up from their loft or coop, never in a circling motion.

Skycutters depend on lifting air currents to fly, making the breed gliders.

== Diet ==
The domesticated rock dove is a grain eater. A staple diet must contain 12%-17% protein and poultry grit.
