= HSwMS Wrangel =

Several ships of the Swedish Navy have been named HSwMS Wrangel, named after the Carl Gustaf Wrangel:

- Wrangel (1666) was a ship launched in 1666
- Wrangel (1742) was a galley launched in 1742
- HSwMS Wrangel (25) was a Wrangel-class destroyer launched in 1917 and decommissioned in 1947
