= HSwMS Sigurd =

History

Sweden
- Name: Sigurd
- Builder: Lindholmens, Gothenburg
- Launched: 19 September 1908
- Commissioned: 22 April 1909
- Stricken: 13 June 1947
- Identification: Pennant number: 5, 22
- Fate: Scrapped, 1951

General characteristics (as built)
- Class & type: Ragnar-class destroyer
- Displacement: 350 long tons (356 t) (normal); 416 long tons (423 t) (deep load)
- Length: 66.1 m (216 ft 10 in)
- Beam: 6.3 m (20 ft 8 in)
- Draft: 1.8 m (5 ft 11 in) (deep load)
- Installed power: 4 Yarrow boilers; 7,200 ihp (5,400 kW)
- Propulsion: 2 shafts; 2 triple-expansion steam engines
- Speed: 30 knots (56 km/h; 35 mph)
- Range: 1,400 nmi (2,600 km; 1,600 mi) at 16 knots (30 km/h; 18 mph)
- Complement: 69
- Armament: 4 × single 75 mm (3 in) guns; 2 × single 45 cm (17.7 in) torpedo tubes

Sigurd was one of three Ragnar-class destroyers built for the Royal Swedish Navy during the first decade of the 20th century. Completed in 1909, she conducted neutrality patrols during both world wars.

== Design and description ==
The Ragnar-class destroyer was an improved version of the preceding Wale. The ships normally displaced 350 long tons (360 t) and 416 long tons (423 t) at full load. They measured 66.1 meters (216 ft 10 in) long overall with a beam of 6.3 meters (20 ft 8 in), and a draft of 1.8 meters (5 ft 11 in). The Ragnars were propelled by two 4-cylinder vertical triple-expansion steam enginess, each driving one three-bladed propeller using steam from four Yarrow boilers. The engines were designed to produce a total of 7,200 indicated horsepower (5,400 kW) for an intended maximum speed of 30 knots (56 km/h; 35 mph). The ships carried enough coal to give them a range of 1,400 nautical miles (2,600 km; 1,600 mi) at 12 knots (22 km/h; 14 mph). The ships' crew numbered 69.

The Ragnar's dispensed with Wale's 57-millimeter (2.2 in) M89/B guns in exchange for two additional 75-millimeter (3 in) M/05 guns. One gun each was located at the forecastle and stern; the other two guns were positioned on the main deck amidships, one gun on each broadside. The ships were equipped with two 457-millimeter (18 in) torpedo tubes in rotating mounts located between the rear funnel and the stern gun. Two 6.5-millimeter (0.26 in) M/10 machine guns were added to the ships in 1911–1912 and the single torpedo tubes were replaced by twin-tube mounts in 1916–1917.

== Construction and career ==
Sigurd was launched on 19 September 1908 by Lindholmens at its shipyard in Gothenburg. The ship was commissioned on 22 April 1909. She conducted neutrality patrols during both world wars.
