= Vincent Persichetti =

American composer and teacher (1915–1987)

- Born: Vincent Ludwig Persichetti; June 6, 1915; Philadelphia, PA, USA
- Died: August 14, 1987 (aged 72); Philadelphia, PA, USA
- Occupations: Composer; teacher; pianist
- Works: List of compositions

Vincent Ludwig Persichetti (June 6, 1915 – August 14, 1987) was an American composer, teacher, and pianist. An important musical educator and writer, he was known for his integration of various new ideas in musical composition into his own work and teaching, as well as for training many noted composers in composition at the Juilliard School.

His students at Juilliard included Philip Glass, Steve Reich, Larry Thomas Bell, Bruce Adolphe, Louis Calabro, Moshe Cotel, Michael Jeffrey Shapiro, Laurie Spiegel, Kenneth Fuchs, Richard Danielpour, Lawrence Dillon, Peter Schickele, Lowell Liebermann, Robert Witt, Elena Ruehr, William Schimmel, Leonardo Balada, Gitta Steiner, Hank Beebe, Roland Wiggins, Thomas Pasatieri, Randell Croley and Leo Brouwer. He also taught composition to Joseph Willcox Jenkins and conductor James DePreist at the Philadelphia Conservatory.

== Life ==
Persichetti was born in Philadelphia, Pennsylvania, in 1915. Though neither of his parents was a musician, his musical education began early. Persichetti enrolled in the Combs College of Music at the age of five, where he studied piano, organ, double bass and later music theory and composition with Russel King Miller, whom he considered a great influence.

He first performed his original works publicly at the age of 14. By the time he reached his teens, Persichetti was paying for his own education by accompanying and performing. He continued to do so throughout high school, adding church organist, orchestral player and radio staff pianist to his experience. In addition to developing his musical talents, he attended art school and remained an avid sculptor until his death. He attended Combs for his undergraduate education as well. After receiving a bachelor's degree in 1936, he was immediately offered a teaching position.

By the age of 20, Persichetti was simultaneously head of the theory and composition department at Combs, a conducting major with Fritz Reiner at the Curtis Institute, and a student of piano (with Olga Samaroff) and composition at the Philadelphia Conservatory of Music. He earned a master's degree in 1941 and a doctorate in 1945 from the Conservatory, as well as a conducting diploma from Curtis. In 1941, while still a student, Persichetti headed the theory and composition department as well as the department of postgraduate study at the Philadelphia Conservatory of Music, where he taught from 1939–1962.

In 1941 Persichetti married Dorothea Flanagan who was a composer as well. They had a daughter Lauren, a dancer, and Garth, an actor.

From 1932 to 1948 he was organist and eventually choirmaster of the Arch Street Presbyterian Church. In 1947, William Schuman offered him a professorship at the Juilliard School. While at Juilliard, Persichetti was devoted to the wind band movement and encouraged William Schuman and Peter Mennin to compose pieces for wind band. He was on staff at Juilliard for over forty years. Persichetti's students included Einojuhani Rautavaara, Leonardo Balada, Steven Gellman, Peter Schickele (P.D.Q. Bach), Michael Jeffrey Shapiro, Claire Polin, Toshi Ichiyanagi, Robert Witt (who also studied with Persichetti at the Philadelphia Conservatory), Randell Croley and Philip Glass. He became editorial director of the Elkan-Vogel publishing house in 1952.

== Music ==
Persichetti is one of the major figures in American music of the 20th century, both as a teacher and a composer. Notably, his Hymns and Responses for the Church Year has become a standard setting for church choirs. His numerous compositions for wind ensemble are often introductions to contemporary music for high school and college students. His early style was marked by the influences of Stravinsky, Bartók, Hindemith, and Copland before he developed his distinct voice in the 1950s.

Persichetti's music draws on a wide variety of thought in 20th-century contemporary composition as well as Big Band music. His own style was marked by use of two elements he refers to as "graceful" and "gritty": the former being more lyrical and melodic, the latter being sharp and intensely rhythmic. Especially true of his early compositions, Persichetti said he "liked bumpy melodic lines and was crazy about music that moved along a zigzag path." He frequently used polytonality and pandiatonicism in his writing, and his music could be marked by sharp rhythmic interjections, but his embracing of diverse strands of musical thought makes characterizing his body of work difficult. This trend continued throughout his compositional career. His music lacked sharp changes in style over time. He frequently composed while driving in his car, sometimes taping staff paper to the steering wheel.

His piano music forms the bulk of his creative output, with a concerto, a concertino, twelve sonatas, and a variety of other pieces written for the instrument. These were virtuosic pieces as well as pedagogical and amateur-level compositions. Persichetti was an accomplished pianist. He wrote many pieces suitable for less mature performers, considering them to have serious artistic merit.

Persichetti is also one of the major composers for the concert wind band repertoire, with his 14 works for the ensemble. In 1950, Persichetti composed his first work for band, which was the Divertimento for Band. The Symphony No. 6 for band is of particular note as a standard larger work. This piece boasts complex percussion lines crucial to the work's thematic material as well as utilizes the full spectrum of colors and timbres of the wind band. He wrote one opera, entitled The Sibyl. The music was noted by critics for its color, but the dramatic and vocal aspects of the work were found by some to be lacking.

He wrote nine symphonies, of which the first two were withdrawn, and four string quartets.

Many of his other works are organized into series. One of these, a collection of primarily instrumental works entitled Parables, contains 25 works, many for unaccompanied wind instruments (complete listing below). His 15 Serenades include such unconventional combinations as a trio for trombone, viola, and cello, as well as selections for orchestra, for band, and for duo piano.

During the 1950s, Persichetti was perceived to "truly achieve his own distinctive voice," in the words of Walter G. Simmons. One of Persichetti's most revered compositions is his Concerto for Piano, Four Hands. This duet was first performed at the Pittsburgh International Contemporary Music Festival on November 29, 1952. The piece itself gives the listener the illusion that the two pianists are having a pleasant conversation, without using words, but just musical notes. The duet featured both Vincent and Dorothea Persichetti as the performers. In his review in the Manchester Guardian, Colin Mason stated, "The Concierto (sic) for Piano, Four Hands was for me one of the most interesting stimulating American works of the Pittsburgh International Contemporary Music Festival."

Persichetti's esthetic was essentially conservative, a distinctive blend of Classical, Romantic and Modernist elements, contrapuntal, rhythmically charged and expertly scored. His musical imagination was multifaceted and highly virtuosic. "Following the lineage of Mozart, Mendelssohn and Ravel, Persichetti's music suggests the innocence and childlike joy of pure musical creativity", Walter Simmons wrote in the New Grove Dictionary of American Music. "Hence many works for beginners stand, with neither condescension nor apology, alongside more difficult compositions."

Persichetti frequently appeared as a lecturer on college campuses, for which he was noted for his witty and engaging manner. He wrote the noted music theory textbook, Twentieth Century Harmony: Creative Aspects and Practice. He and Flora Rheta Schreiber wrote a monograph on William Schuman.

Persichetti was a big fan of collaboration between music and dance. He encouraged his students at Juilliard to work with the dance program to create compositions for the dancers choreography. Persichetti also collaborated with choreographers professionally. He worked with Martha Graham. He admired her seriousness and her commitment to movement. Persichetti believed that music has to stand on its own and can not be married to dance, one can not depend on the other. He once said, "There isn't such thing as dance music. Music is dance, it's motion."

Persichetti performed many concerts consisting of improvisation. He believed any composer/artist must improvise to create.

== Works ==
=== Selected works ===
- Celebrations, for Chorus and Wind Ensemble, Op. 103
- Chorale Prelude: So Pure the Star, Op. 91
- Chorale Prelude: Turn Not Thy Face, Op. 105
- Divertimento for Band, Op. 42
- Masquerade for Band, Op. 102
- Masques for violin and piano Op. 99
- Mass for a capella mixed chorus, Op. 84
- Pageant, Op. 59
- Parable IX for Band, Op. 121
- Pastoral for Wind Quintet, Op. 21
- Psalm for Band, Op. 53
- Symphony No. 6 for Band (1956)
- The Hollow Men, for trumpet and string orchestra, Op. 25
- The Sibyl: A Parable of Chicken Little (Parable XX): An Opera in One Act, Op. 135
- Winter Cantata, Op. 97 for Women's Chorus, Flute, and Marimba

=== Complete listing of parables ===
- Parable [I] for Flute, Op. 100 (1965)
- Parable II for Brass Quintet, Op. 108 (1968)
- Parable III for Oboe, Op. 109 (1968)
- Parable IV for Bassoon, Op. 110 (1969)
- Parable V for Carillon, Op. 112 (1969)
- Parable VI for Organ, Op. 117 (1971)
- Parable VII for Harp, Op. 119 (1971)
- Parable VIII for Horn, Op. 120 (1972)
- Parable IX for Band, Op. 121 (1972)
- String Quartet No. 4 (Parable X), Op. 122 (1972)
- Parable XI for Alto Saxophone, Op. 123 (1972)
- Parable XII for Piccolo, Op. 125 (1973)
- Parable XIII for Clarinet, Op. 126 (1973)
- Parable XIV for Trumpet, Op. 127 (1975)
- Parable XV for English Horn, Op. 128 (1973)
- Parable XVI for Viola, Op. 130 (1974)
- Parable XVII for Double Bass, Op. 131 (1974)
- Parable XVIII for Trombone, Op. 133 (1975)
- Parable XIX for Piano, Op. 134 (1975)
- The Sibyl: A Parable of Chicken Little (Parable XX): An Opera in One Act, Op. 135
- Parable XXI for Guitar, Op. 140 (1978)
- Parable XXII for Tuba, Op. 147 (1981)
- Parable XXIII for Violin, Cello, and Piano, Op. 150 (1981)
- Parable XXIV for Harpsichord, Op. 153 (1982)
- Parable XXV for Two Trumpets, Op. 164 (1986)

=== Poems for piano ===
- Volume 1, Op. 4:
1. Unroll the flicker's rousing drum (Louis Untermeyer First Words Before Spring)
2. Soft is the collied night (James Elroy Flecker Fountains)
3. Gather for festival bright weed and purple shell (William Watson Songs from Cyprus)
4. Wake subtler dreams, and touch me nigh to tears (William Watson The Frontier)
5. Ravished lute, sing to her virgin ears (Robert Fitzgerald Song after Campion)
6. Whose thin fraud I wink at privily (William Watson The Mock Self)
- Volume 2, Op. 5:
1. And warm winds spilled fragrance into her solitudes (Edmond Kowalewski Change)
2. To whose more clear than crystal voice the frost had joined a crystal spell (Léonie Adams Home Coming)
3. Sleep, weary mind; dream, heart's desire (Edna St. Vincent Millay There are no islands any more)
4. Dust in sunlight, and memory in corners (T. S. Eliot A Song for Simeon)
5. Make me drunken with deep red torrents of joy (John Gould Fletcher Autumnal Clouds)
- Volume 3, Op. 14:
1. Rear its frondings sighing in aetherial folds (Hart Crane Royal Palm)
2. Listen! Can you hear the antic melody of fear those two anxious feet are playing? (Walter Prude)
3. Puffed out and marching upon a blue sky (Amy Lowell Lilacs)
4. And hunged like those top jewels of the night (Léonie Adams Twilit Revelation)
5. Each gay dunce shall lend a hand (John Trumbull The Country Clown)

=== List of selected works ===
- Concertino for Piano, Op. 16 (1941)
- Symphony No. 1, Op. 18 (1942)
- Symphony No. 2, Op. 19 (1942)
- Dance Overture, Op. 20 (1942)
- Fables, Op. 23 (1943)
- The Hollow Men, Op. 25 (1944)
- Symphony No. 3, Op. 30 (1946)
- Serenade No. 5, Op. 43 (1950)
- Fairy Tale, Op. 48 (1950)
- Symphony No. 4, Op. 51 (1951)
- Symphony for Strings (Symphony No. 5), Op. 61 (1953)
- Symphony No. 7 'Liturgical', Op. 80 (1958)
- Piano Concerto, Op. 90 (1962)
- Introit, Op. 96 (1964)
- Symphony No. 8, Op. 106 (1967)
- Symphony No. 9 'Sinfonia janiculum', Op. 113 (1970)
- Night Dances, Op. 114 (1970)
- A Lincoln Address, Op. 124 (1972), originally written for Nixon's 2nd inauguration, incorporating text from Lincoln's 2nd inaugural address, but pulled from the program. Later premiered January 25, 1973 by Walter Susskind and the St. Louis Symphony with narration by William Warfield.
- Concerto for English Horn and Strings, Op. 137 (1977)
- Band:
  - Divertimento, Op. 42 (1950)
  - Psalm, Op. 53 (1952)
  - Pageant, Op. 59 (1953)
  - Symphony for Band (Symphony No. 6), Op. 69 (1956)
  - Serenade No. 11, Op. 85 (1960)
  - Bagatelles, Op. 87 (1961)
  - So Pure the Star, chorale prelude, Op. 91 (1962)
  - Masquerade, Op. 102 (1965)
  - Turn not thy Face, chorale prelude, Op. 105 (1966)
  - O Cool is the Valley (Poem for Band), Op. 118 (1971)
  - A Lincoln Address, Op. 124a, nar, band (1973)
  - O God Unseen, chorale prelude, Op. 160 (1984)
- Vocal
  - Choral:
    - Magnificat and Nunc Dimittis, Op. 8, SATB, pf (1940)
    - Canons, Op. 31, SSAA/TTBB/SATB (1947)
    - 2 Cummings Choruses (e.e. cummings), Op. 33, 2vv, pf (1948)
      1. jimmie's got a goil
      2. sam was a man
    - Proverb, Op. 34, SATB (1948)
    - 2 Cummings Choruses, Op. 46, SSAA (1950)
      1. hist whist
      2. this is the garden
    - Hymns and Responses for the Church Year (W.H. Auden, Dickinson, Milton, Shakespeare, Psalms, Shelley, and others), Op. 68 (1955), originally a commission for a single hymn by Carleton Sprague Smith for Smith's collection American Hymns.
    - Seek the Highest (F. Adler), Op. 78, SAB, pf (1957)
    - Song of Peace (anon.), Op. 82, TTBB/SATB, pf (1959)
    - Mass, Op. 84, SATB (1960)
    - Stabat mater, Op. 92, SATB, orch (1963)
    - Te Deum, Op. 93, SATB, orch (1963)
    - Spring Cantata (Cummings), Op. 94, SSAA, pf (1963)
    - Winter Cantata (11 Haiku), Op. 97, SSAA, fl, mar (1964)
    - 4 Cummings Choruses, Op. 98, 2vv, pf (1964)
      1. dominic has a doll
      2. nouns to nouns
      3. maggie and millie and molly and may
      4. uncles
    - Celebrations (cantata, W. Whitman), Op. 103, SATB, wind ens (1966)
    - The Pleiades (cantata, Whitman), Op. 107, SATB, tpt, str (1967)
    - The Creation (Persichetti), Op. 111, S, A, T, Bar, SATB, orch (1969)
    - Love (Bible: Corinthians), Op. 116, SSAA (1971)
    - Glad and Very (Cummings), Op. 129, 2vv (1974)
    - Flower Songs (Cantata No. 6) (Cummings), Op. 157, SATB, str (1983)
    - Hymns and Responses for the Church Year, Vol. 2, Op. 166 (1987)
  - Solo:
    - e.e. cummings Songs, Op. 26 (1945), unpublished
    - 2 Chinese Songs, Op. 29 (1945)
    - 3 English Songs (17th century), Op. 49 (1951), unpublished
    - Harmonium (W. Stevens), song cycle, Op. 50, S, pf (1951)
    - Sara Teasdale Songs, Op. 72 (1957), unpublished
    - Carl Sandburg Songs, Op. 73 (1957), unpublished
    - James Joyce Songs, Op. 74 (1957)
    - Hilaire Belloc Songs, Op. 75 (1957)
    - Robert Frost Songs, Op. 76 (1957), unpublished
    - Emily Dickinson Songs, Op. 77 (1957)
    - A Net of Fireflies (Jap., trans. H. Steward), song cycle, Op. 115 (1970)
- Chamber and Solo Instrumental
  - 3 or more instruments:
    - Serenade No. 1, Op. 1, 10 wind (1929)
    - String Quartet No. 1, Op. 7 (1939)
    - Concertato, Op. 12, piano quintet (1940)
    - Serenade No. 3, Op. 17, violin, cello, piano (1941)
    - Pastoral, Op. 21, woodwind quintet (1943)
    - String Quartet No. 2, Op. 24 (1944)
    - King Lear, Op. 35, woodwind quintet, timpani, piano (1948)
    - Serenade No. 6, Op. 44, trombone, viola, cello (1950)
    - Piano Quintet, Op. 66 (1954)
    - String Quartet No. 3, Op. 81 (1959)
  - 1–2 instruments:
    - Suite, Op. 9, violin, cello (1940), unpublished
    - Sonata, Op. 10, violin (1940)
    - Fantasy, Op. 15, violin, piano (1941), unpublished
    - Vocalise, Op. 27, cello, piano (1945)
    - Serenade No. 4, Op. 28, violin, piano (1945)
    - Sonata, Op. 54, cello (1952)
    - Little Recorder Book, Op. 70 (1956)
    - Serenade No. 9, Op. 71, 2 recorder (1956)
    - Serenade No. 10, Op. 79, flute, harp (1957)
    - Infanta marina, Op. 83, viola, piano (1960)
    - Serenade No. 12, Op. 88, tuba (1961)
    - Serenade No. 13, Op. 95, 2 clarinets (1963)
    - Masques, Op. 99, violin, piano (1965)
    - Serenade No. 14, Op. 159, oboe (1984)
- Keyboard
  - Piano:
    - Serenade No. 2, Op. 2 (1929)
    - Sonata No. 1, Op. 3 (1939)
    - Poems, Vols.1–2, opp.4–5 (1939)
    - Sonata No. 2, Op. 6 (1939)
    - Sonata, Op. 13, 2 pianos (1940)
    - Poems, Vol. 3, Op. 14 (1941)
    - Sonata No. 3, Op. 22 (1943)
    - Variations for an Album, Op. 32 (1947)
    - Sonata No. 4, Op. 36 (1949)
    - Sonata No. 5, Op. 37 (1949)
    - Sonatina No. 1, Op. 38 (1950)
    - Sonata No. 6, Op. 39 (1950)
    - Sonata No. 7, Op. 40 (1950)
    - Sonata No. 8, Op. 41 (1950)
    - Sonatina No. 2, Op. 45 (1950)
    - Sonatina No. 3, Op. 47 (1950)
    - Serenade No. 7, Op. 55 (1952)
    - Concerto, Op. 56, 4 hands (1952)
    - Parades, Op. 57 (1952)
    - Sonata No. 9, Op. 58 (1952)
    - Little Piano Book, Op. 60 (1953)
    - Serenade No. 8, Op. 62, 4 hands (1954)
    - Sonatina No. 4, Op. 63 (1954)
    - Sonatina No. 5, Op. 64 (1954)
    - Sonatina No. 6, Op. 65 (1954)
    - Sonata No. 10, Op. 67 (1955)
    - Sonata No. 11, Op. 101 (1965)
    - Little Mirror Book, Op. 139 (1978)
    - Reflective Studies, Op. 138 (1978)
    - 4 Arabesques, Op. 141 (1978)
    - 3 Toccatinas, Op. 142 (1979)
    - Mirror Etudes, Op. 143 (1979)
    - Sonata No. 12, Op. 145 (1980
    - Winter Solstice, Op. 165 (1986
  - Other:
    - Sonatine, Op. 11, organ pedals (1940)
    - Harpsichord Sonata No. 1, Op. 52 (1951)
    - Sonata for Organ, Op. 86 (1960), commissioned by the St. Louis chapter of the AGO, premiered by Rudolph Kremer at the AGO chapter's 50th anniversary concert.
    - Shimah b'koli, Op. 89, organ (1962)
    - Drop, Drop Slow Tears, chorale prelude, Op. 104, organ (1966)
    - Do Not Go Gentle, Op. 132, organ pedals (1974)
    - Auden Variations, Op. 136, organ (1977), commissioned by the Hartt College of Music for organist Leonard Raver, premiered by Raver at Hartt's International Contemporary Organ Music Festival on July 14, 1978.
    - Dryden Liturgical Suite, Op. 144, organ (1979), commissioned by the University of Michigan's Marilyn Mason Commissioning Fund, dedicated to Marilyn Mason, premiered by Mason in June 1980 at the AGO's national convention in Minneapolis.
    - Harpsichord Sonata No. 2, Op. 146 (1981)
    - Song of David, Op. 148, org (1981)
    - Harpsichord Sonata No. 3, Op. 149 (1981)
    - Harpsichord Sonata No. 4, Op. 151 (1982)
    - Harpsichord Sonata No. 5, Op. 152 (1982)
    - Harpsichord Sonata No. 6, Op. 154 (1982)
    - Little Harpsichord Book, Op. 155 (1983)
    - Harpsichord Sonata No. 7, Op. 156 (1983)
    - Harpsichord Sonata No. 8, Op. 158 (1984)
    - Serenade No. 15, Op. 161, harpsichord (1984)
    - Give Peace, O God, chorale prelude, Op. 162, organ (1985)
    - Harpsichord Sonata No. 9, Op. 163 (1985)

== Awards and honors ==
- In honor of Persichetti's influence on American music, on May 19, 1984, he was awarded the University of Pennsylvania Glee Club Award of Merit. Beginning in 1964, this award "established to bring a declaration of appreciation to an individual each year that has made a significant contribution to the world of music and helped to create a climate in which our talents may find valid expression."
- Persichetti was an honorary brother of the Delta Eta chapter of Phi Mu Alpha Sinfonia at Youngstown State University. He was initiated into the fraternity on April 1, 1961.
- Persichetti was an honorary brother of the Omicron chapter of Kappa Kappa Psi at West Virginia University. He was initiated into the fraternity on November 17, 1967.
