= Gothenburg Squadron =

- Göteborgseskadern
- Active: 1939–1951
- Country: Sweden
- Branch: Swedish Navy
- Type: Maritime security, mine clearance
- Role: Training unit
- Size: Squadron
- Garrison/HQ: Gothenburg

Gothenburg Squadron (Swedish: Göteborgseskadern, GE) was a naval squadron of the Swedish Navy which has operated in various forms from 1939 to 1951. The unit was based at Gothenburg naval base at Nya Varvet in Gothenburg.

== History ==
The oldest written evidence of a naval station in Gothenburg dates from 1523, when Gustav Vasa based a number of smaller ships at Old Älvsborg Fortress. The Gothenburg Squadron was discontinued in 1959, and its war organization was partly taken over by the Third Squadron (Tredje eskadern). In the peace organization, the newly formed 6th Mine Clearance Department (6. minröjningsavdelningen, 6. mröjA), which was to be placed at the Gullmarn base in Skredsvik, took over the tasks from the Gothenburg Squadron.

== World War II ==
During the fall of 1939, the Gothenburg Squadron consisted of the following ships:

- Coastal defence ships: Manligheten
- Destroyers: Wrangel and Wachtmeister
- Submarines: Hajen, Sälen and Valrossen
- Minesweepers: Starkodder and Styrbjörn
- Gunboats: Skagerack
- Patrol boats: 2 x type I and 6 x type II

In September, the squadron was strengthened with the Coastal Fleet's destroyers Klas Horn and Göteborg as well as two submarines.

Full compilation of the Gothenburg Squadron's naval forces during World War II
Ship type	Fall of 1939	9 April 1940	Spring of 1941	Spring of 1942	29 July 1943	Spring of 1944	Spring of 1945
Coastal defence ships	Manligheten	Manligheten	Manligheten	Manligheten	Manligheten	Manligheten	Manligheten
Cruisers				Fylgia			
Destroyers	Wrangel; Wachtmeister	Wrangel; Wachtmeister	Wrangel; Wachtmeister; Psilander; Puke	Wrangel; Wachtmeister; Psilander; Puke	Wrangel; Wachtmeister; Psilander; Puke	Puke; Klas Horn; Karlskrona; Göteborg	Klas Horn; Göteborg
Auxiliary barracks ships				Tjelvar	Tjelvar	Tjelvar	
Depot ships							Jacob Bagge
Salvage ships							Isbrytaren II
Submarines	Hajen; Sälen; Valrossen	Hajen; Sälen; Valrossen	Hajen; Sälen; Valrossen	Springaren; Delfinen; Nordkaparen; Ulven; Gripen; Draken	Springaren; Delfinen; Nordkaparen; Gripen; Draken	Springaren; Delfinen; Nordkaparen; Gripen; Draken; U 4 U 5 U 6	U 7 U 8 U 9
Minesweepers	Starkodder; Styrbjörn	Starkodder; Styrbjörn	Koster; Kullen; Vinga; Ven; Starkodder; Styrbjörn	Koster; Kullen; Vinga; Ven; Starkodder; Styrbjörn	Koster; Kullen; Vinga; Ven; Starkodder; Styrbjörn	Koster; Kullen; Vinga; Ven; Starkodder; Styrbjörn	Koster; Vinga; Ven; Starkodder; Styrbjörn
Auxiliary cruisers		Hjkr 10 Fidra					
Auxiliary gunboats	Skagerack	Skagerack; Odin	Skagerack; Odin	Skagerack; Odin	Skagerack; Odin	Skagerack; Odin	Skagerack; Odin
M-boats					4x	6x	5x
Motor Torpedo Boats					6x	3x	4x
Patrol boats							Thetis; Astrea
Auxiliary patrol boat type I	2x	2x	2x	2x			2x
Auxiliary patrol boat type II	6x	12x	18x	12x	12x	12x	12x
