= Rangel (disambiguation) =

Rangel is a Spanish and Portuguese surname.

Rangel may also refer to the following places:

- Rangel, Luanda, Angola
- Rangel Municipality, Mérida, Venezuela)

== See also ==
- Wrangle (disambiguation)
- Wrangel (disambiguation)
- Irma Lerma Rangel Young Women's Leadership School in Dallas, Texas, U.S.
- Rangle, small stones fed to hawks to aid digestion
