= Robert William Witt =

American classical composer

Robert William Witt (March 4, 1930 – September 18, 1967) was an American neoclassical and experimental composer. A native of Youngstown, Ohio, he was a composer, pianist, and professor of music at Dana School of Music at Youngstown State University. Like his mentor, Vincent Persichetti, Witt was well known for the exploration of new musical forms and for integrating old themes into new works.

== Life ==
Robert Witt was born in Youngstown, Ohio, son of Alvy T. and Lillian Keffer Witt. Recognized as a prodigy at a young age, Robert began his musical career at the age of five by taking piano lessons. Formal studies in music continued throughout his youth at Ursuline School of Music and Dana School of Music. Witt continued his musical studies at the Cleveland Conservatory of Music with Ruth Edwards from 1945 to 1946, at the Peabody Conservatory of Music in Baltimore from 1946–1948, where he studied with Nicolas Nabokov, Pasquale Tallarico, and Renée Longy-Miquelle, and at the Philadelphia Conservatory of Music from 1949–1950.

It was at the Philadelphia Conservatory of Music that he began to study with his mentor, Vincent Persichetti, who recommended him for studies at Juilliard. While at Juilliard from 1950–1953, Witt was awarded an honorary scholarship, and he continued his studies in composition with Persichetti. A teaching fellowship in literature and materials of music was bestowed on him while he was still an undergraduate, as an assistant to Bernard Wagenaar, and he received both his B.S. in Music in 1952 and M.S. in Music in 1953.

In the fall of 1951, Witt married Eva Mondrut, a coloratura soprano, and over the next ten years they produced five children – three daughters and two sons. Following graduation, Witt was Director of Music at Foxhollow School for Girls, one of the Berkshire preparatory schools in Lenox, Massachusetts. He also taught at the Emma Willard School for Girls in Troy, New York.

1955 and 1956 were pivotal years in his life. Witt had been a severe diabetic since childhood, and in 1956 he lost his eyesight to glaucoma. Within a year, he taught himself Braille and began transcribing his music into Braille. He resumed composing, performing and teaching as an Assistant Professor of Music at the Dana School of Music at Youngstown State University.

As a professor at the Dana School of Music, Witt was loved and respected by students and colleagues alike. He was awarded the Danforth Foundation Fellowship in 1963, and took a leave from teaching duties (which included Composition, Theory, History and Literature of Music, and Piano) to pursue doctoral studies in Musicology at Ohio State University. In 1964, he received the Ohio Federation of Music Clubs’ Outstanding Graduate Student award.

During the summer of 1964, his wife was stricken with cancer, and the family returned to their home in Youngstown, and Witt to his teaching position at Dana. His PhD work was complete with the exception of three course hours. In 1965, Witt signed a contract with the American Choral Foundation Institute to provide music for “The American Choral Foundation Series,” a new publication project to be issued by Lawson-Gould, a subsidiary of G. Schirmer, Inc., under the direction of Margaret Hillis. Witt's Four Motets to the Blessed Virgin Mary was to have been published in this project, but personal and family health problems precluded the completion of the contract.

In March 1967, Robert Witt fell ill from the complications of his diabetes. His condition progressively deteriorated until his death on September 18, 1967; he was thirty-seven years old at the time of his death. His wife succumbed to cancer the following February.

== Music ==
Although he made his first attempts at composition when he was six years old, Witt began serious composition while in high school, and was one of the first two male graduates of Ursuline School of Music’s music department, presenting a graduation recital of three compositions: Prelude, Lorelei-Reverie, and Syncaprice.

In 1951 and 1952, Witt represented Juilliard in the Symposia of the International Federation of Music Students. In March 1951, his Divertimento for Three Woodwinds was presented at Yale University, and presented again a year later in New York under the auspices of the League of Composers. His Te Deum for Chorus and Brass Quintet was performed at the Symposia in 1952, and later that year was enthusiastically received at Carnegie Hall when performed by the New York Concert Choir, directed by Margaret Hillis. Commissioned by the Youngstown Philharmonic and premiered by them in February 1953, his Concerto Grosso (Concertato for Orchestra) was selected by the Juilliard faculty as the best composition by a graduate student composer, and was played at Juilliard’s commencement exercises in 1953 when Witt received his Master of Science in Music.

His Sonatina #1 premiered in 1955; that same year, he was the first winner of the Youngstown Philharmonic Ohio Composer competition. His works for both full and chamber orchestras were presented on radio, in concerts at Yale, Carnegie Hall, Juilliard, Michigan State University, Cleveland Institute of Music, by the Youngstown Philharmonic Orchestra, and elsewhere during 1955 and 1956.

Two works, Benediction Service and Three Landscapes for Piano and Voice, were premiered in 1957 with Witt’s wife, Eva, as the featured soprano soloist. In 1959, four of his pieces were performed in Vienna at the Academy for Music and Performance Art in “An Evening of Chamber Music by Four Young American Composers.” Featured in the Vienna performance were Witt's Sonatinas #1 and #2 for Piano, Three Landscapes, and Sonata for Piano. His works were also featured in a program by the Youngstown Music Teacher's Association in 1959.

Vincent Persichetti conducted Witt's Paean for Orchestra at the Tri-State Orchestral Composers Symposium in April 1964 at Michigan State University; the Paean was selected as the best from works submitted by composers from Ohio, Michigan and Indiana. Also in 1964, the Hughes Quartet of Ohio State University premiered Witt's String Quartet #1 at the Tri-State Composers of Chamber Music Symposium in Cleveland. They performed the work a second time at Bluffton College, in 1965, again at Ohio State University, and a third time in 1966 in a concert of Witt's works.

During the last few years of his life, Witt was influenced by advances made during collaborations with colleagues in Germany, and he began to experiment with electronic music. At that time, he wrote Abstracts in Motion, Music for Dance, which showcased one of the most innovative pieces of music performed at Dana, which combined electronic music with modern dance choreography featuring black-clad dancers and fluorescent hoops and batons under black light.

In March 1967, Dana honored Witt with a concert of his works, entitled “An Evening of Music by Robert Witt,” and featured the Hughes String Quartet, as well as fellow musicians and students from Dana. This concert premiered his transcendent Four Motets to the Blessed Virgin Mary, and included the Three Etudes for Piano, performed by Dolores Fitzer, to whom he had dedicated the Etude for Left Hand Only. The program additionally featured his Concertante for Six Instruments, as well as Three Seascapes from the works of Shakespeare and Walt Whitman, Two Songs based on the poetry of James Joyce, Four Lyrics of Carl Sandburg, Five Animal Stories based on the poems of Ogden Nash, Variations for Clarinet and Piano, and Divertimento #2 for Two Equal Wind Instruments.

Several of his pieces have been performed posthumously, notably Abstracts in Motion, Music for Dance; Four Lyrics of Carl Sandburg, which was performed by Anthony Hopkins in recital at Dana; the Three Etudes for Piano, performed by Dolores Fitzer; and the Ave Maria from his Four Motets to the Blessed Virgin Mary was performed in a lecture concert of American choral music at the Dana School of Music by guest conductor and lecturer Greg Smith in 1988. 1995 saw his west-coast premiere of the complete Four Motets to the Blessed Virgin Mary, performed by the San Francisco Lyric Chorus. Most recently, his Te Deum for Chorus and Brass Quintet was performed by the Nativity Adult Choir in Raleigh, NC in 1996 in a concert entitled ”Sacred Choral Music of the 20th Century.”

== Works ==
=== Selected works ===
- Op. 1 Variations and Inventions for Piano (August, 1949)
- Op. 1a “Brooklyn Suite” (for 4 Trumpets, November, 1948)
  1. Prelude
  2. Intermezzo
  3. Scherzo
  4. Introduction and Finale
- Op. 1b "Why Couldn’t You Love Me?" (voice and piano – undated)
- Op. 1c Suite in B♭ (For B♭ clarinet and bassoon – undated)
- Op. 1d Rondo-Fantasy (for bassoon and piano – February, 1949)
- Op. 1e Loveliest of Trees (For high voice and piano – July 28, 1948)
- Op. 1f Lyric Fantasy on The "Rubaiyat" of Omar Khayyam (for soprano and piano – undated)
- Op. 2 Four Preludes for Piano (undated)
- Op. 3 Sonata for Clarinet and Piano (undated)
- Op. 4 Three Two-part Inventions for Piano (December, 1949)
- Op. 5 Divertimento #1 for Three Woodwinds (1950)
- Op. 6 Three Landscapes for Piano and Voice (T. S. Eliot) (March, 1950)
  1. Virginia
  2. Usk
  3. New Hampshire
- Op. 7 Two Songs (Joyce) (undated)
  1. "O Cool Is the Valley Now"
  2. "Sleep Now"
- Op. 8 Three Bagatelles for Piano (undated)
- Op. 9 Three Seascapes (undated)
  1. Full Fathom Five (Shakespeare, The Tempest)
  2. The Dismantled Ship (Whitman)
  3. On Montauk Point (Whitman)
- Op. 10 Divertimento No. 2 for Two Equal Wind Instruments (undated)
- Op. 11 Quintet for Piano and Strings (undated)
- Op. 12 Concertante for Six Instruments (one movement, undated)
- Op. 13 Te Deum (for Chorus and Brass Quintet, undated)
- Op. 14 Finale for Orchestra (October–December, 1951)
- Op. 15 Two Studies (for Piano, undated)
- Op. 16 Dance (for clarinet and cello, undated)
- Op. 17 Concertato for Orchestra: Concerto Grosso (December, 1952)
- Op. 18 Sonatina No. 1 (for piano, undated)
- Op. 19 String Quartet No. 1 (1953)
- Op. 20 Five Animal Stories (for SATB chorus, February, 1954)

1. The Flea (Roland Young)
2. The Turtle (Ogden Nash)
3. The Duck (Ogden Nash)
4. The Kitten (Ogden Nash)
5. The Rhinoceros (Ogden Nash)

- Op. 21 Four Pieces for Orchestra (1954)

1. Prelude
2. Dance
3. Nocturne
4. Burlesk

- Op. 22 Interlude (for piano four hands, undated)
- Op. 23 Sonatina No. 2 (for Piano, undated)
- Op. 24 Music for "Bethlehem" (undated)
- Op. 25 Three Etudes for Piano

1. For the Left Hand Alone (December, 1955)
2. Octave (July, 1957)
3. Repeated Notes (November, 1959)

- Op. 26 Benediction Service (for Women's Chorus, undated)
  1. O Salutaris Hostia
  2. Tantum Ergo
  3. Laudate Dominum
- Op. 27 Suite for Piano (undated)
  1. Prologue
  2. Waltz
  3. Melody
  4. March
  5. Variations on a French Lullaby
- Op. 28 Divertimento No. 3 (for two violins, undated)
- Op. 29 Four Motets: To the Blessed Virgin Mary (for SATB choir, undated)
  1. Salve, Regina
  2. Ave Maria
  3. Stabat Mater
  4. Magnificat
- Op. 30 Sonatina No. 3 (for piano, undated)
- Op. 31 Four Lyrics of Carl Sandburg (for Baritone and Piano, undated)
  - Fog
  - Nocturne in a Deserted Brickyard
  - Prayers of Steel
  - Lost
- Op. 32 Five Easy Pieces for Piano (undated)
  1. March
  2. Song
  3. Scherzo
  4. Fantasy
  5. Rondo
- Op. 33 Paean for Orchestra (undated)
- Op. 34 Divertimento No. 4 (for oboe, trumpet and English horn, undated)
- Op. 35 Variations for Clarinet and Piano (undated)
- Op. 36 Four Bagatelles for Orchestra (undated)
- Op. 37 Sonata for Piano (undated)
- Op. 38 Toccata for Piano (undated)
- Op. 39 Three Responses (Songs for Catholic Mass, undated)
- Op. 40 Studies for Woodwind Quintet (October, 1966)
- Op. 41 Music for Dance #1: Abstracts in Motion (January–February, 1967)

=== Additional early and/or incomplete works ===
- The Lorelei-Reverie (January 15, 1945)
- Prelude Fantasque (July 23, 1945)
- Twilight (Walt Whitman, February 10, 1947)
- Prelude and Scherzo (April, 1949)
- The Dust of Timas (October, 1949)
- Russian Hymn (October 26, 1949)
- America (October 12, 1949)
- Concerto in One Movement (for Piano and Orchestra, undated)
- Preludes (four, undated)
- Symphony No. 1 (unfinished, 1956)
- For Unaccompanied Violin (November 26, 1965 – incomplete)

=== Variations on other compositions ===
- Come, Sweet Death (J. S. Bach, October 26, 1949)
- Traumerei (R. Schumann, November 23, 1949)
- Andante from Sonatina (Kuhlau, December 7, 1949)
- Pesther Waltz (Joseph Lanner, December 14, 1949)
- Rondo (Kuhlau, January 4, 1950)
- Minuet (Beethoven, January 11, 1950)
- Nocturne (Chopin, January 18, 1950)
- Minuet (Boccherini, February 15, 1950)
- Auf dem Wasser zu singen (Schubert, February 22, 1950)
- Der Lindenbaum (Schubert, February 22, 1950)
- Es ist genug (Chorale "Es ist genug", used by J. S. Bach in Cantata 60, March 1, 1950)
- Andante (Kuhlau, March 8, 1950)
- Andante (Beethoven, January 11, 1950)
- Spinning Song (Mendelssohn, March 22, 1950)
- Du bist die Ruh (Schubert, March 29, 1950)
- Romance (Rubenstein, April 27, 1950)

=== Arrangements ===
- Sylvia (Oley Speaks – arranged for SSA Choir)
- Sonata pian' e forte (G. Gabrieli, arranged for mixed brass and saxophone ensemble)
- Sarabande and Echo (J. S. Bach – arranged for tenor saxophone)
- Rumanian Folk Dances (I and III) (Béla Bartók, arranged for two pianos)
- Variazione Sopra “La Romanesca” (Biagio Marini, arranged for treble recorder and piano)

== Honors and awards ==
- Youngstown Philharmonic's Ohio Composer Competition Winner, December, 1955
- Danforth Foundation Teacher Study Grant, 1963–1964
- Ohio Federation of Music Clubs Outstanding Graduate Student, 1964
- Professional Life Member, Phi Mu Alpha Sinfonia Music Fraternity
