= Grit (supplement) =

Digestive aid

Grit is a material eaten by birds to aid in their diets and digestion. Wild birds find grit naturally while foraging, and farmers can purchase grit for their domestic fowl. There are two forms: soluble grit, which dissolves in a bird's digestive system and is often made of calcium; and insoluble grit, which remains in the gizzard and is usually composed of stone. Grit that starts off in rough or angular pieces may become rounded off as it is used in a bird's gizzard.

Grit is sold in stores for use in poultry rearing. It can prevent domestic from developing an impacted crop, especially during molting season, when chickens are prone to eating their own feathers. Its use in wild waterfowl and gallinaceous birds has been the subject of many avenues of research: their status as game birds, their population densities, the potential role of grit in lead poisoning, and pesticides that grit may include.

== History ==
Grit has been known to avian researchers since at least the late 1700s. The first written report on grit usage is from Lazzarro Spallanzani in 1783. United States federal and state researchers began dedicating significant attention to grit by the start of the 1900s.

== Soluble grit ==
Soluble grit dissolves in a bird's digestive system. Soluble grit can be made from limestone or coarsely ground or broken seashells. Chicken eggs may be used as soluble grit, but some people avoid leaving them out for birds as they may harbor salmonella. Soluble grit is usually made from calcium-high materials; the calcium helps the bird in egg shell production. If a bird fails to consume soluble grit, the weight and thickness of its eggshells will decline, though the rate of laying will be unaffected.

Grit from seashells is called shell grit, and it is most frequently made from oyster and cockle shells, as they do not break down into sharp shards like scallop and mussel shells do. Shell grit production has economic benefits. In the early 20th century, in American east coast cities such as Baltimore, a number of grinding mills for turning oyster shells for grit were formed, and patented machines for cleaning and processing the shells were invented. These mills and methods allowed the United States to produce over $2 million worth of shell grit in 1921. Today, shell grit can be worth between $320 to $2,400 per ton. As shells are a byproduct of the seafood industry, the commercial sale of shell grit can be seen as a way to recycle what would otherwise be waste; however, using shells for this purpose prevents them from being used as a carbon store.

== Insoluble grit ==
Insoluble grit consists mainly of crushed stone (though often with additives). These do not dissolve in the bird's digestive system; instead, they remain in the gizzard for weeks or months to help the bird grind up its food for digestion. Stones used may include quartz, granite, feldspar, and phosphate rock. Insoluble grit is found in the gizzards of birds that eat plant parts and some that eat invertebrates. Because of its grinding function, this kind of grit is sometimes called "hen's teeth."

Granivorous birds rely on insoluble grit to break down the tough outer casings of the seeds they consume. They may go to roadsides or trails to find grit. If insoluble grit cannot be found, some birds, like wild turkeys, may use cherry pits as substitutes.

=== Lead poisoning ===
Lead ammunition and fishing tackle can kill birds which use the remains for insoluble grit. This is especially prevalent in seed-eating birds, though waterfowl are also greatly affected. Birds may be attracted to shooting ranges for this very reason. Birds may also accumulate high levels or arsenic in their bones as a result of using lead for grit. Lead poisoning in waterfowl was first identified as a problem in 1842, by German C.J. Fuchs. Solutions include banning lead ammunition and tackle, offering buybacks of lead materials, and promoting the use of alternative materials, such as steel.

== Usage of grit ==
The size of grit particles varies widely by species, from less than 0.1 millimeter in diameter to, in the case of larger birds like ostriches, over 2.5 cm in diameter. Juvenile birds will often ingest smaller pieces of grit than adults, as in Sarus cranes. The rate of grit consumed can vary even among closely related species; for example, Wilson's phalaropes consume 5 times as much grit as red-necked phalaropes. Within the same species, grit consumption can vary as well. A study on grit usage in chickens found that, compared to birds fed non-herbivorous diets, birds given in herbivorous diet will eat larger pieces of grit, keep grit in their gizzards for longer, and excrete fewer amounts of grit.

== See also ==
- Gastrolith
- Rangle
