= George Witt (politician) =

American politician (1863–1925)

G. M. Witt
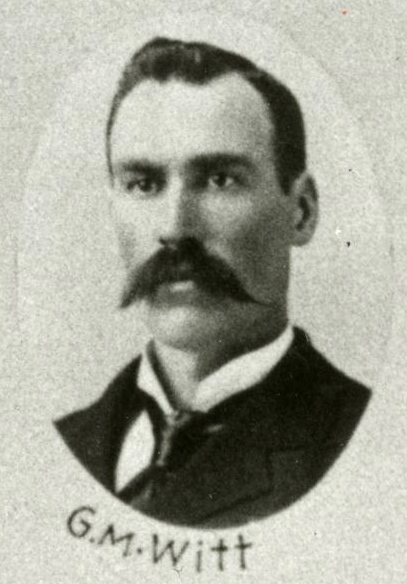
- Witt in 1895

Member of the Washington House of Representatives for the 15th district
- In office 1895–1899

Personal details
- Born: January 20, 1863 near Georgetown, Tennessee, United States
- Died: January 10, 1925 (aged 61) Lincoln County, Washington, United States
- Party: Populist

George Muncy Witt (January 20, 1863 – January 10, 1925) was an American politician in the state of Washington. He served in the Washington House of Representatives from 1895 to 1899.
