= International Naval Research Organization =

The International Naval Research Organization was founded in 1964 and incorporated in the US state of Massachusetts.

The organization is the publisher of the quarterly magazine, Warship International; the journal is mainly about warships in the era of iron and steel (about 1860 to date). The International Naval Research Organization is a non-profit organization.

== Warship International ==
Warship International
- Categories: Military history, warships
- Frequency: Quarterly
- Publisher: International Naval Research Organization
- Founded: 1964
- Country: United States
- Based in: Toledo, Ohio
- Language: English
- Website: www.warship.org
- ISSN: 0043-0374
- OCLC: 1647131

Warship International is a quarterly magazine published by the International Naval Research Organization that was established in 1964. It publishes articles about various types of warships, especially since the advent of ironclad warships (1860–onwards), with a focus on ship designs (armor, armaments, etc.) and careers, but does not cover mercantile vessels or naval battle descriptions. There is also a section for current warship-related news as well as a review section for naval books.

The headquarters of Warship International is in Toledo, Ohio.
