= Otto Witt =

Swedish author

Otto Witt (1875–1923) was a Swedish writer. He was one of the prominent figures in early Swedish science fiction. He did, among other things, publish Hugin, a science magazine "which was also filled with speculative articles and fiction". Hugin was one of the first magazines to regularly carry science fiction in the world, although it appears to have had little influence outside Sweden.

== Hugin ==
Hugin was published between 7 April 1916 and 15 January 1920. The schedule was in theory fortnightly, though it was in practice plagued by delays and published irregularly. It ran for 85 issues, though many were double- or triple-numbered, making for a total of 65 individual issues. The Encyclopedia of Science Fiction describes it as a "popular science magazine [...] which included some short sf". It has been described as an early science fiction magazine, for instance by Swedish science fiction critic Sam J. Lundwall; US science fiction scholar Sam Moskowitz rejects this characterization, writing that the proportion of science fiction to non-fiction content was so low (some issues containing no fiction at all) that it does not even count as a fiction magazine. Swedish science fiction critic John-Henri Holmberg, in The Encyclopedia of Science Fiction, similarly writes that describing Hugin as a science fiction magazine "is greatly overstating the truth" as the bulk of the magazine's content consisted of non-fiction.
