= Bofors 75 mm m/12 gun =

- Type: Naval gun
- Place of origin: Sweden

Service history
- In service: 1912–1938?

Production history
- Designer: Bofors AB, Krupp
- Designed: 1912
- Manufacturer: Bofors AB
- Produced: 1912

Specifications
- Mass: 1,010 kg (2,230 lb)
- Length: 3.975 m (13 ft)
- Barrel length: 3.675 m (12 ft 1 in) L/49
- Shell weight: 6.5 kg (14 lb)
- Caliber: 75 mm (3 in)
- Muzzle velocity: 780 m/s (2,600 ft/s)

The Bofors 75 mm m/12 was a Swedish naval gun deployed aboard the Sverige-class coast-defense ships built during the First World War. It also served as the main armament of the Wrangel-class destroyers.
