= Wrangel-class destroyer =

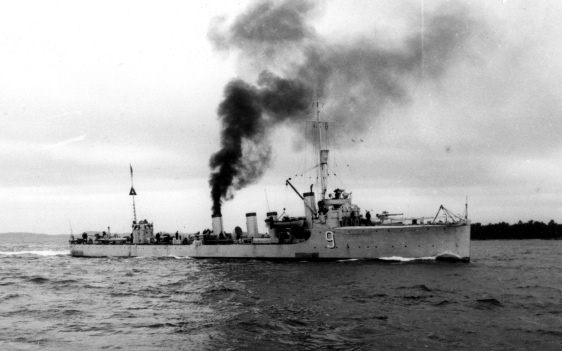
- Wrangel in 1930

Class overview
- Operators: Swedish Navy
- Preceded by: Hugin class
- Succeeded by: Ehrensköld class
- Built: 1916–1918
- In commission: 1916–1947
- Planned: 4
- Completed: 2
- Cancelled: 2
- Scrapped: 2

General characteristics
- Type: Destroyer
- Displacement: 415 t (408 long tons) (standard); 498 t (490 long tons) (full load)
- Length: 69.6 m (228 ft 4 in)
- Beam: 6.9 m (22 ft 8 in)
- Draught: 2.8 m (9 ft 2 in)
- Installed power: 4 Yarrow boilers; 11,000 shp (8,200 kW)
- Propulsion: 2 screws; 2 geared steam turbines
- Speed: 34 knots (63 km/h; 39 mph)
- Complement: 81
- Armament: 4 × single 75 mm (3 in) guns; 2 × twin, 2 × single 457 mm (18 in) torpedo tubes

The Wrangel class was a class of four destroyers built for the Royal Swedish Navy during World War I of which two were cancelled before they were laid down. Completed in 1918, they were in service until shortly after the end of World War II in 1945. Wrangel served as a target ship before she was sunk in 1960 and Wachtmeister was broken up for scrap in 1951.

== Background and description ==
The Wrangel class completed a line of Swedish 30-knot (56 km/h; 35 mph) destroyers, originating from HSwMS Wale. Compared to contemporary destroyers in other navies, the ships were significantly smaller and more lightly armed, but they were improved versions of the preceding Hugin class and were the first Swedish destroyers to use single-reduction geared turbines. The Wrangel class had a standard displacement of 415 tonnes (408 long tons) and 498 t (490 long tons) at full load. The destroyers measured 69.6 metres (228 ft 4 in) long at the waterline and 72.0 m (236 ft 3 in) overall with a beam of 6.9 m (22 ft 8 in) and a mean draught of 2.8 m (9 ft 2 in). (Note: Whitley has the ships with a standard displacement of 472 t (465 long tons), an overall length of 70.9 m (232 ft 7 in) and a beam of 6.7 m (22 ft 0 in).)

The Wrangels were powered by a pair of de Laval geared steam turbines, each driving one propeller shaft using steam provided by four coal-fired Yarrow boilers. The turbines were designed to produce a total of 11,000 shaft horsepower (8,200 kW), but actually produced 13,000 shp (9,700 kW) that gave them a maximum speed of 34 knots (63 km/h; 39 mph). The ships carried 105 t (103 long tons; 116 short tons) of coal. The destroyers had a complement of 81 officers and ratings.

The destroyers were armed with four 50-calibre 75-millimetre (3 in) m/12 guns in single mounts. One gun was situated fore and aft of the superstructure and the other two were on the broadside amidships. The guns fired 6.5-kilogram (14 lb) shells at a muzzle velocity of 780 metres per second (2,600 ft/s). They also mounted two 6.5 mm (0.26 in) M1914 machine guns. The torpedo armament of the Wrangel-class destroyers consisted of 457 mm (18 in) torpedoes fired from two twin-tube mounts located on the centreline aft of the funnels and one single tube on each broadside between the second and third funnels.

=== Modifications ===
The boilers of the Wrangels were converted to use fuel oil in 1927. They were rearmed in 1940, adding one Bofors 25-millimetre (1 in) M/32 anti-aircraft gun and two 8 mm (0.31 in) M36 machine guns while having their two single torpedo tube mounts removed. This increased their standard displacement to 498 t (490 long tons).

== Ships in class ==
Construction data
Name	Builder	Laid down	Launched	Commissioned	Stricken	Fate
Wrangel	Lindholmens, Gothenburg, Sweden	1916	25 September 1917	4 May 1918	13 May 1947	Used as a target ship; sank 1960
Wachtmeister	Lindholmens, Gothenburg, Sweden	1916	19 December 1917	19 October 1918	13 June 1947	Sold for scrap, 1950
Ehrensköld	Cancelled					
Nordenskjöld	Cancelled					

== Construction and careers ==
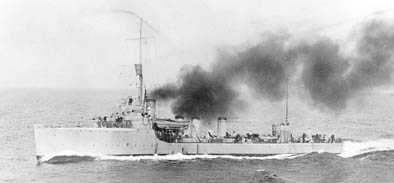
Wachtmeister at sea

Four ships were authorised in 1914 at the beginning of World War I. However, the final two ships of the class were cancelled due to economic reasons. Constructed in Sweden, HSwMS Wrangel and HSwMS Wachtmeister were both laid down in 1916 and completed in 1918. They were initially given the pennant numbers 9 and 10 respectively, but in 1940, these were changed to 25 and 26 respectively. Both destroyers saw little action during their service due to Sweden's neutrality during both world wars beyond sailing on neutrality patrols. Wrangel was stricken from the Navy Directory on 13 May 1947. The vessel was used as a target ship for tests and was sunk in 1960. Wachtmeister was stricken on 13 June 1947 and sold for scrap in 1951. (Note: Whitley has them both stricken on 13 June 1947.)
