= Witt and Berg =

1920s vaudeville duo

Witt and Berg was the name of a vaudeville duo during the 1920s. It consisted of ukulelist Bob Witt and guitarist Cy Berg. Largely forgotten today, they were popular with their charming singing voices.

== Premiere Entertainers and Other Films ==
The duo starred in an experimental 1926 sound film, recorded and produced by The Vitaphone Corporation. They sang a combination of Sonny Cunha's Honolulu Hula Girl and Abel Baer and L. Wolfe Gilbert's Hello, Aloha, How Are You?.

Another experimental sound film made in 1926 was The Voice from the Screen, where a Bell Laboratories scientist explains the Vitaphone recording system and its labor, filming Witt and Berg from a different angle.

== Works cited ==
- Eyman, Scott (1997-03-13). The Speed of Sound: Hollywood and the Talkie Revolution 1926-1930. Simon and Schuster. p. 102. ISBN 9781439104286.
- Wurtzler, Steve J. (2013-08-13). Electric Sounds: Technological Change and the Rise of Corporate Mass Media. Columbia University Press. pp. 84–85. ISBN 9780231510080.
