= HSwMS Wale =

Swedish Hugin class destroyer

History

Sweden
- Name: Wale
- Namesake: Váli
- Builder: Kockums
- Launched: 21 September 1907
- Completed: 11 April 1908
- Out of service: 18 October 1940
- Fate: Sunk as target, 26 September 1946

General characteristics
- Displacement: 350 long tons (356 t)
- Length: 66.1 m (216 ft 10 in)
- Beam: 6.3 m (20 ft 8 in)
- Draught: 1.8 m (5 ft 11 in)
- Installed power: 4 × Yarrow boilers; 7,200 shp (5,369 kW)
- Propulsion: 2 shafts; 2 triple-expansion engines
- Speed: 30 knots (56 km/h; 35 mph)
- Range: 1,400 nmi (2,600 km; 1,600 mi) at 12 knots (22 km/h; 14 mph)
- Complement: 69
- Armament: 2 × single 75 mm (3 in) guns; 4 × single 57 mm (2.2 in) guns; 2 × single 457 mm (18 in) torpedo tubes

HSwMS Wale (3) was a destroyer built for the Royal Swedish Navy in the first decade of the 20th century.

== Design and description ==
Wale was an improved version of the Magne. The ship normally displaced 350 long tons (360 t) and 416 long tons (423 t) at full load. She measured 66.1 meters (216 ft 10 in) long overall with a beam of 6.3 meters (20 ft 8 in), and a draft of 1.8 meters (5 ft 11 in). Wale was propelled by two 4-cylindervertical triple-expansion steam enginess, each driving one three-bladed propeller using steam from four Yarrow boilers. The engines were designed to produce a total of 7,200 indicated horsepower (5,400 kW) for an intended maximum speed of 30 knots (56 km/h; 35 mph). On Wale's sea trials, she reached 30.7 knots (56.9 km/h; 35.3 mph) from 8,971 ihp (6,690 kW). The ship carried enough coal to give her a range of 1,400 nautical miles (2,600 km; 1,600 mi) at 12 knots (22 km/h; 14 mph). The ship's crew numbered 69.

Wale's main armament consisted of two 75-millimeter (3 in) M/05 guns, one gun each at the forecastle and stern. Her secondary armament included 57-millimeter (2.2 in) M89/B guns positioned on the main deck amidships, two guns on each broadside. The ship was equipped with two 457-millimeter (18 in) torpedo tubes in rotating mounts located between the rear funnel and the stern gun.

== Construction and career ==
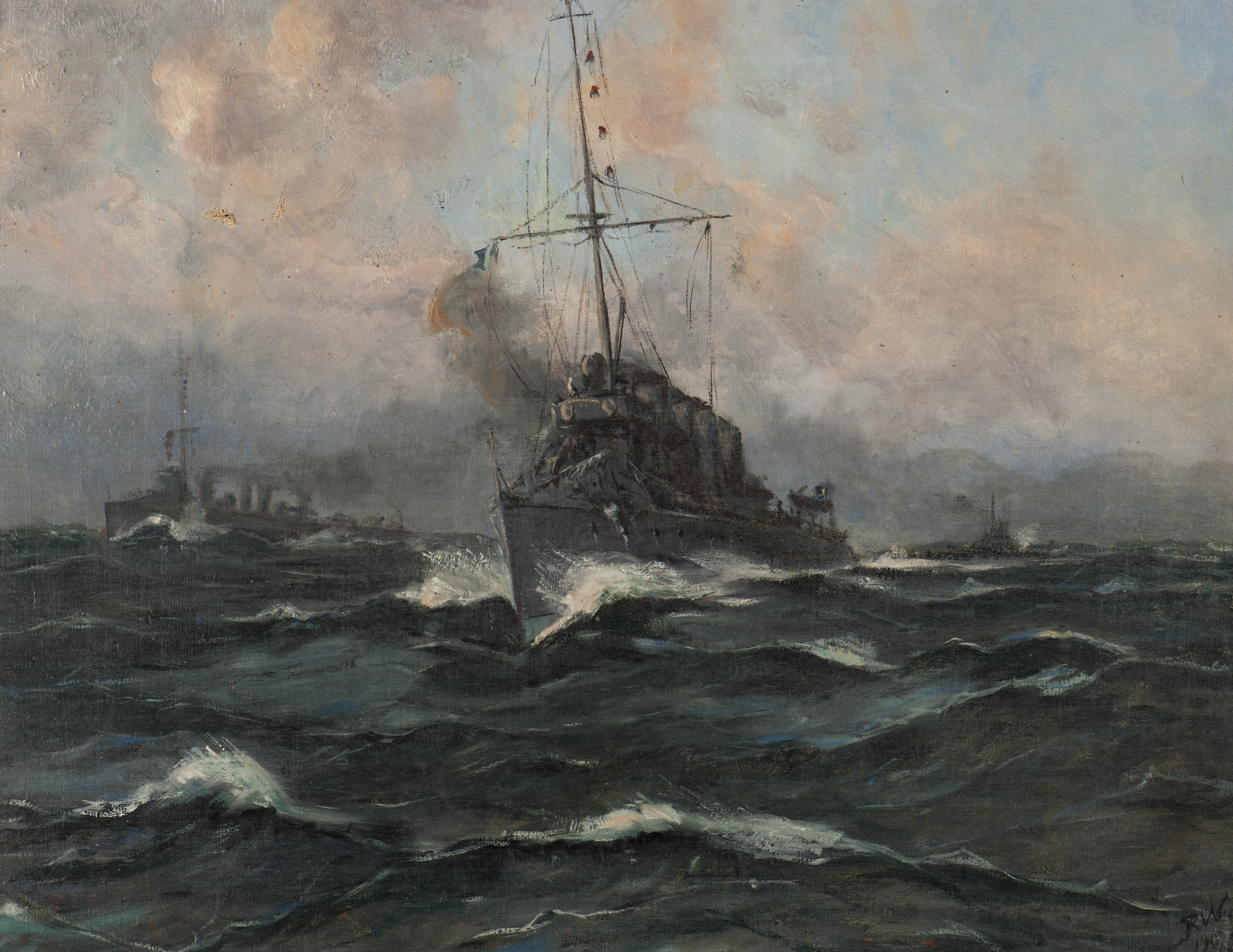
HSwMS Mode, Magne and Wale

Wale was built by Kockums Shipyard, launched on 21 September 1907 and delivered to the fleet on 11 April 1908. She was the first destroyer to be built in Sweden and was influential in the development of the destroyers in that nation. After Wale, in the years 1907–1911, another five destroyers followed built to essentially the same design. These were two ships of the Hugin class and three ships of the Ragnar class. Wale was decommissioned on 18 November 1940. She was sunk as a target outside Fårösund by the Swedish Coastal Artillery and the HSwMS Sundsvall on 26 September 1946.

== Bibliography ==
- Borgenstam, Curt; Insulander, Per; Kaudern, Gösta (1989). Jagare: med Svenska flottans jagare under 80 år (in Swedish). Marinlitteratur. ISBN 91-970700-4-1. SELIBR 7792227.
- Friedman, Norman (2011). Naval Weapons of World War One: Guns, Torpedoes, Mines and ASW Weapons of All Nations; An Illustrated Directory. Seaforth Publishing. ISBN 978-1-84832-100-7.
- Harris, Daniel (2000). "Swedish Steam Torpedo Boats". In Preston, Antony (ed.). Warship 2000–2001. Conway Maritime Press. pp. 97–124. ISBN 0-85177-791-0.
- von Hofsten, Gustaf; Waernberg, Jan & Ohlsson, Curt S. (2003). Örlogsfartyg: svenska maskindrivna fartyg under tretungad flagg. [Forum navales skriftserie], 1650-1837; [6] (in Swedish). Stockholm: Svenskt militärhistoriskt bibl. i samarbete med Marinlitteratur. ISBN 919743843X. SELIBR 8873330.
- Westerlund, Karl-Eric (1985). "Sweden". In Gray, Randal (ed.). Conway's All the World's Fighting Ships 1906–1921. Conway Maritime Press. pp. 355–363. ISBN 978-0-85177-245-5.
