= Ragnar-class destroyer =

Class of Swedish destroyers

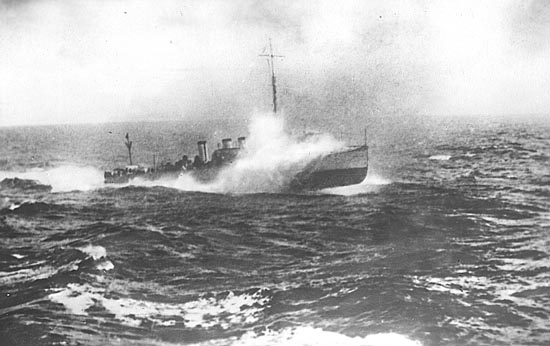
- Ragnar at sea

Class overview
- Builders: Kockums Shipyard
- Operators: Swedish Navy
- Preceded by: Wale
- Succeeded by: Hugin class
- In commission: 1908–1947
- Completed: 3
- Retired: 3

General characteristics (as built)
- Type: Destroyer
- Displacement: 350 long tons (356 t) (normal); 416 long tons (423 t) (full load)
- Length: 66.1 m (216 ft 10 in)
- Beam: 6.3 m (20 ft 8 in)
- Draft: 1.8 m (5 ft 11 in)
- Installed power: 4 Yarrow boilers; 7,200 ihp (5,400 kW)
- Propulsion: 2 shafts; 2 triple-expansion engines
- Speed: 30 knots (56 km/h; 35 mph)
- Range: 1,400 nmi (2,600 km; 1,600 mi) at 12 knots (22 km/h; 14 mph)
- Complement: 69
- Armament: 4 × single 75 mm (3 in) guns; 2 × single 457 mm (18 in) torpedo tubes

The Ragnar class consisted of three destroyers built for the Royal Swedish Navy before World War I, Ragnar, Sigurd, and Vidar.

== Design and description ==
The Ragnar-class destroyer was an improved version of the preceding Wale. The ships normally displaced 350 long tons (360 t) and 416 long tons (423 t) at full load. They measured 66.1 meters (216 ft 10 in) long overall with a beam of 6.3 meters (20 ft 8 in), and a draft of 1.8 meters (5 ft 11 in). The Ragnars were propelled by two 4-cylinder vertical triple-expansion steam enginess, each driving one three-bladed propeller using steam from four Yarrow boilers. The engines were designed to produce a total of 7,200 indicated horsepower (5,400 kW) for an intended maximum speed of 30 knots (56 km/h; 35 mph). On Vidar's sea trials, she reached 31.3 knots (58.0 km/h; 36.0 mph). The ships carried enough coal to give them a range of 1,400 nautical miles (2,600 km; 1,600 mi) at 12 knots (22 km/h; 14 mph). The ships' crew numbered 69.

The Ragnar's dispensed with Wale's 57-millimeter (2.2 in) M89/B guns in exchange for two additional 75-millimeter (3 in) M/05 guns. One gun each was located at the forecastle and stern; the other two guns were positioned on the main deck amidships, one gun on each broadside. The ships were equipped with two 457-millimeter (18 in) torpedo tubes in rotating mounts located between the rear funnel and the stern gun. Two 6.5-millimeter (0.26 in) M/10 machine guns were added to the ships in 1911–1912 and the single torpedo tubes were replaced by twin-tube mounts in 1916–1917.
