= Rangle =

Falconry term for small stones which were fed to hawks to aid in digestion

In falconry, rangle is a term used for small stones which are fed to hawks to aid in digestion. These stones, which are generally slightly larger than peas, are used less often now than they were historically.

== See also ==
- Gastrolith
- Grit
