= Hugin-class destroyer =

Royal Swedish Navy destroyer class

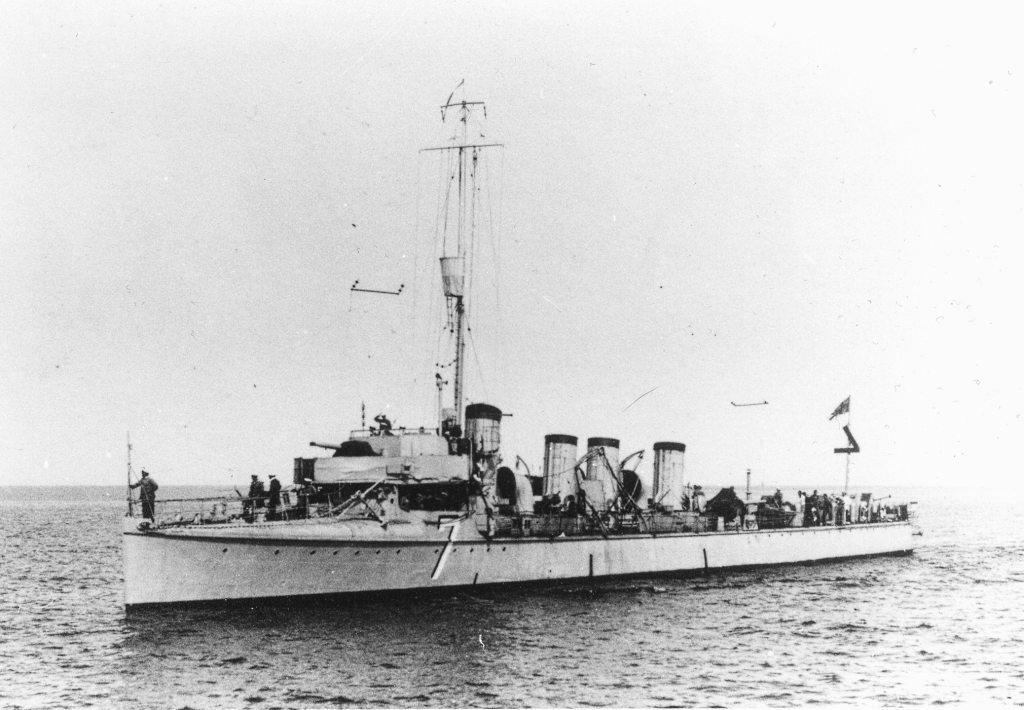
- Hugin as she appeared in 1926

Class overview
- Builders: Götaverken
- Operators: Swedish Navy
- Preceded by: Ragnar class
- Succeeded by: Wrangel class
- In commission: 1910–1947
- Completed: 2
- Retired: 2

General characteristics
- Type: Destroyer
- Displacement: 350 long tons (356 t) (normal); 420 long tons (427 t) (deep load)
- Length: 66.3 m (217 ft 6 in)
- Beam: 6.5 m (21 ft 4 in)
- Draft: 1.8 m (5 ft 11 in)
- Installed power: 4 water-tube boilers; 10,000 shp (7,500 kW)
- Propulsion: 2 shafts; 2 steam turbines
- Speed: 30 knots (56 km/h; 35 mph)
- Range: 1,500 nmi (2,800 km; 1,700 mi) at 16 knots (30 km/h; 18 mph)
- Complement: 73
- Armament: 4 × single 75 mm (3 in) guns; 2 × single 45 cm (17.7 in) torpedo tubes

The Hugin class of destroyers consisted of Hugin and Munin built for the Royal Swedish Navy built prior to the First World War. They were the first Swedish warships built with steam turbines. Both ships conducted neutrality patrols during the First World War, but Munin was too worn out to be modernized and was stricken from the navy list in 1940. Hugin conducted neutrality partols during the Second World War before she was scrapped in 1947.

== Design and description ==
The Hugin-class ships were improved versions of the earlier Ragnar class and were the first Swedish warships built with steam turbines. The ships displaced 350 long tons (360 t) at normal load and 429 long tons (436 t) at full load. The destroyers measured 65.8 metres (215 ft 11 in) long at the waterline and 66.3 m (217 ft 6 in) overall with a beam of 6.5 m (21 ft 4 in) and a draught of 1.8 m (5 ft 11 in) at normal load. The Hugins were powered by a pair of AEG-Curtiss direct-drive steam turbines, each driving one propeller shaft using steam provided by four coal-fired Yarrow boilers. The turbines were designed to produce a total of 10,000 shaft horsepower (7,500 kW) for a maximum speed of 30 knots (56 km/h; 35 mph). Both ships handily exceeded their designed speed with Hugin reaching 31.2 knots (57.8 km/h; 35.9 mph) and Munin 33.5 knots (62.0 km/h; 38.6 mph). They carried enough coal to give them a range of 1,500 nautical miles (2,800 km; 1,700 mi) at a speed of 16 knots (30 km/h; 18 mph). The ships had a complement of 73 officers and ratings.

The Hugin class was armed with four 50-calibre 75-millimetre (3 in) m/05 guns in single mounts. One gun was situated on the forward superstructure and another on the stern; the other two were on the broadside amidships. The guns fired 6.5-kilogram (14 lb) shells at a muzzle velocity of 780 metres per second (2,600 ft/s). The ships were also armed with two 457 mm (18 in) torpedo tubes on single mounts located on the centreline between the stern gun and the funnel.

=== Modifications ===
The ships exchanged their single torpedo-tube mounts for twin-tube mounts in 1916 and Munin had her bridge elevated four years later. Both ships replaced their stern gun with a pair of twin-gun mounts for 25 mm (0.98 in) Bofors anti-aircraft guns in 1939. They also had a pair of depth charge racks added at the stern. Hugin was reboilered in 1941–1942 and had her guns replaced.

== Construction and careers ==
Hugin was built by Götaverken and launched on December 10, 1910 while Munin was constructed by Kockums and launched on 5 December 1911. Both ships made neutrality patrols during the First World War. Munin was decommissioned on 18 October 1940 and was sunk as a bomb target in 1946. Hugin made neutrality patrols during the Second World War as well and was scrapped at Karlskrona on 13 June 1947.

== Citations ==
=== Bibliography ===
- Brassey, Thomas, ed. (1912). "II List of British and Foreign Ships. Ordinance Tables". The Naval Annual 1912. Portsmouth: J. Griffin & Co.: 177–268. OCLC 1118005447.
- Friedman, Norman (2011). Naval Weapons of World War One: Guns, Torpedoes, Mines and ASW Weapons of All Nations; An Illustrated Directory. Barnsley, UK: Seaforth Publishing. ISBN 978-1-84832-100-7.
- Parkes, Oscar; Prendergast, Maurice (1969). Jane's Fighting Ships 1919. Newton Abbott: David & Charles. OCLC 907574860.
- Westerlund, Karl-Erik (1992). Svenska Örlogsfartyg 1855–1905 [Swedish Naval Ships 1855–1905] (in Swedish). Karlskrona: Abrahamson. ISBN 978-9-18707-213-0.
- Westerlund, Karl-Erik (1985). "Sweden". In Gray, Randal (ed.). Conway's All the World's Fighting Ships 1906–1921. London: Conway Maritime Press. pp. 355–363. ISBN 978-0-85177-245-5.
