= 75 mm kanon M/05 =

- Type: Naval gun
- Place of origin: Sweden

Service history
- In service: 1907–

Production history
- Designed: 1905–1907
- Manufacturer: Finspong, Stockholm Vapenfabrik
- Produced: 1907–

Specifications
- Mass: 975 kg (2,150 lb)
- Length: 3.97 m (13 ft)
- Barrel length: 3.675 m (12 ft 1 in) L/49
- Shell weight: 6.5 kg (14 lb)
- Caliber: 75 mm (3 in)
- Muzzle velocity: 780 m/s (2,600 ft/s)

The 75 mm kanon M/05 was a Swedish naval gun deployed aboard a number of early Swedish destroyers as their main armament.

== Bibliography ==
- Friedman, Norman (2011). Naval Weapons of World War One: Guns, Torpedoes, Mines and ASW Weapons of All Nations; An Illustrated Directory. Barnsley, UK: Seaforth Publishing. ISBN 978-1-84832-100-7.
