= List of ship launches in 1875 =

The list of ship launches in 1875 includes a chronological list of some ships launched in 1875.

Date	Ship	Class / type	Builder	Location	Country	Notes
7 January	Minerva	Steam yacht	Hansen	Cowes	United Kingdom	For Mr. Broadwood.
8 January	Sidney Grace	Schooner	Hugh Williams	Portmadoc	United Kingdom	For Henry Jones and others.
9 January	City of Canterbury	Steamship	Messrs. Barclay, Curle & Co.	Glasgow	United Kingdom	For Messrs. George Smith & Sons.
9 January	Formosa	Barque	Messrs. Roy & Mitchell	Alloa	United Kingdom	For Imperial Japanese Government.
9 January	Hapsburg	Steamship	Earle's Shipbuilding and Engineering Company, Limited.	Hull	United Kingdom	For Norddeutscher Lloyd.
9 January	W. W. Lloyd	Brig	Messrs. Henry Roberts & Co.	Portmadoc	United Kingdom	For Mr. Lloyd.
19 January	Perseverance	Paddle tug		Devonport Dockyard	United Kingdom	For Admiralty.
21 January	Aberfeldy	Steamship	Messrs. Edward Withy & Co.	Hartlepool	United Kingdom	For Messrs. Groves, Maclean & Co.
21 January	British Duke	Full-rigged ship	Barrow Ship Building Co. Ltd.	Barrow-in-Furness	United Kingdom	For British Shipowners Co. Ltd.
21 January	Killean	Clipper	Messrs. John Reid & Co.	Port Glasgow	United Kingdom	For Messrs M'Kinnon, Frew & Co.
22 January	Arctic	Whaler	Alexander Stephen & Sons	Dundee	United Kingdom	For private owner.
23 January	Celeste	Steamship	Messrs. R. Cragg & Sons	Middlesbrough	United Kingdom	For Messrs. J. Manners & Co.
23 January	Desdemona	Merchantman	Messrs. W. H. Potter & Co.	Liverpool	United Kingdom	For private owner.
23 January	Othello	Clipper	Messrs. C. T. Bowring & Co.	Liverpool	United Kingdom	For Messrs. Royden & Sons.
23 January	Stad Haarlem	Steamship	Messrs. A. & J. Inglis	Pointhouse	United Kingdom	For Koninklikj Nederlandse Stoomboot Maatschappij.
25 January	Craignair	Barque	Messrs. Robert Duncan & Co.	Port Glasgow	United Kingdom	For Alexander Rae.
25 January	Earl of Zetland	Merchantman	Messrs. A. M'Millan & Son	Dumbarton	United Kingdom	For Messrs. Alexander Thomson & Nephews.
25 January	Windsor Castle	Barque	Messrs. H. Murray & Co.	Port Glasgow	United Kingdom	For Messrs. Jacobs Bros.
6 February	Aros Bay	Merchantman	Messrs. Dobie & Co.	Govan	United Kingdom	For Messrs. Hatfield, Cameron & Co. Run into by Loch Ranza after launch.
6 February	Lactura	Merchantman	J. G. Lawrie	Whiteinch	United Kingdom	For private owner.
6 February	Loch Ranza	Merchantman	Messrs. Charles Connell & Co	Scotstoun	United Kingdom	For Messrs. J. & R. Wilson. Ran into Aros Bay after launch whilst under tow.
6 February	Rio Grande	Paddle steamer	Messrs. W. Walker & Co.	Deptford	United Kingdom	For Brazilian National Steam Navigation Company.
8 February	King Richard	Steamship	Messrs. J. Readhead & Sons	South Shields	United Kingdom	For King Line.
8 February	Stella	Steamship	Messrs. T. B. Seath & Co.	Rutherglen	United Kingdom	For Trinity House.
8 February	Tenasserim	Steamship	Messrs. William Denny & Bros.	Dumbarton	United Kingdom	For Messrs. P. Henderson & Co.
9 February	Cyrene	Steamship	Messrs. Bowdler, Chaffer & Co.	Seacombe	United Kingdom	For Messrs. Richard Nicholson & Sons.
9 February	Lady Pryse	Brigantine	Mr. Jones	Aberystwyth	United Kingdom	For Thomas Jones.
9 February	Richard Owen	Brig	Richard Williams	Aberystwyth	United Kingdom	For private owner.
11 February	Dryad	Steamship	D. Swan	Maryhill	United Kingdom	For Messrs. Morris, Munro & Co.
12 February	Jennie Gardiner	Paddle steamer	Messrs. J. Norman & Co.	Glasgow	United Kingdom	For private owner.
12 February	Rajanattianuhar	Steamship	Messrs. John Elder & Co.	Fairfield	United Kingdom	For Messrs. D. R. Macgregor.
17 February	Hawea	Steamship	Messrs. William Denny & Bros.	Dumbarton	United Kingdom	For James Mills.
20 February	Darent	Steamship	Messrs. T. Turnbull & Son	Whitby	United Kingdom	For private owner.
20 February	Scots Greys	Steamship	Messrs. Raylton, Dixon & Co.	Middlesbrough	United Kingdom	For private owner.
22 February	Lake Nepigon	Steamship	London and Glasgow Shipbuilding Co.	Glasgow	United Kingdom	For Beaver Line.
22 February	Thomas Sorby	Steamship	Messrs. Raylton, Dixon & Co.	Middlesbrough	United Kingdom	For Star Ball Line.
23 February	Carpasian	Barquentine		Ayr	United Kingdom	For Messrs. Walter Grieve & Son.
23 February	Culzean Castle	Merchantman	Messrs. Thomas Wingate & Co.	Whiteinch	United Kingdom	For Castle Line.
24 February	Egeron	Steamship	Messrs. John Elder & Co.	Fairfield	United Kingdom	For Nederlandsch-Indische Handelsbank.
24 February	Falstaff	Full-rigged ship	Barrow Ship Building Co. Ltd.	Barrow-in-Furness	United Kingdom	For J. Beazley.
24 February	Fernandez Sanz	Steamship	Messrs. Blackwood & Gordon	Port Glasgow	United Kingdom	For Messrs. Fernandez Sanz & Co.
24 February	Porto Alegre	Steamship	Messrs. William Hamilton & Co.	Port Glasgow	United Kingdom	For Rio Grande do Sul Steamship Company (Limited).
February	Rambler	Schooner	Philip Bellot	Gorey	(United Kingdom of Great Britain and Ireland) Jersey	For John Whitley & Co.
February	South of England	Steamship	Messrs. Irvine & Co.	West Hartlepool	United Kingdom	For S. Hough.
6 March	Abertawe	Hopper dredger	Messrs. W. Simons & Co.	Renfrew	United Kingdom	For Swansea Harbour Trustees.
6 March	Edith	Humber Keel	Mr. Wake	Goole	United Kingdom	For Goole and Hull Steam Towing Company (Limited).
6 March	Midlothian	Merchantman	Messrs. Charles Connell & Co.	Whiteinch	United Kingdom	For Messrs. Grandison & Boyd.
6 March	Sumner	Hopper barge	Messrs. Murdoch & Murray	Port Glasgow	United Kingdom	For Provincial Government of Canterbury, New Zealand.
8 March	Alliance	Gunboat		Norfolk Navy Yard	United States	For United States Navy.
8 March	Dreadnought	Ironclad		Pembroke Dockyard	United Kingdom	For Royal Navy.
8 March	J. B. Walker	Steamship	Messrs. Raylton, Dixon & Co	Middlesbrough	United Kingdom	For Star Ball Line.
9 March	Abercarne	Barque	Messrs. M'Kellar, M'Millan & Co.	Dumbarton	United Kingdom	For Messrs. Burgess, Shaddick & Boyd.
9 March	Loch Fergus	Barque	Messrs. David & William Henderson & Co.	Partick	United Kingdom	For Messrs. D. & J. Sproat.
9 March	Merapi	Steamship	Messrs. Caird & Co.	Greenock	United Kingdom	For Nederlandse Indische Stoomboot Maatschappij.
9 March	Minnie	Mersey Flat	Robert Jones	Foryd	United Kingdom	For Llandulas Quarry Co., or for Messrs. Raines, Lupton & Co.
9 March	Opal	Emerald-class corvette	William Doxford & Sons Ltd.	Sunderland	United Kingdom	For Royal Navy.
9 March	Osburgha	Brigantine	Messrs. Alexander Stephen & Sons	Linthouse	United Kingdom	For William Cook and others.
9 March	Tryfan	Mersey Flat	Robert Jones	Foryd	United Kingdom	For Llandulas Quarry Co., or for Messrs. Raines, Lupton & Co.
10 March	Aglaia	Barque	Harland & Wolff	Belfast	United Kingdom	For Workman Bros.
10 March	R. H. Jones	Barque	Co-operative Shipbuilding Co	Pembroke Dock	United Kingdom	For Mr. Jones and others.
10 March	Storfewsten	Steamship	Messrs. Raylton, Dixon & Co.	Middlesbrough-on-Tees	United Kingdom	For private owner.
11 March	Ben Avon	Steamship	Messrs. Hall, Russell & Co.	Aberdeen	United Kingdom	For Messrs. J. & A. Davison.
12 March	Airlie	Merchantman	Messrs. Alexander Stephen & Sons	Linthouse	United Kingdom	For private owner.
12 March	Ann Mactavish	Schooner	Messrs. P. Barclay & Son	Ardrossan	United Kingdom	For private owner.
13 March	Anna Clara	Steamship	Messrs. Blackwood & Gordon	Port Glasgow	United Kingdom	For Messrs. Wilson Bros. & Co.
15 March	Lady of the Isles	Steamship	Harvey & Co.	Hayle	United Kingdom	For West Cornwall Steam Ship Company.
17 March	Energy	Lighter	David Swan	Kelvindock	United Kingdom	For Messrs. Burrell & Haig.
20 March	Argyll	Steamship	Messrs. Aitken & Mansel	Whiteinch	United Kingdom	For John Bruce and others.
20 March	Taupo	Steamship	Messrs. William Denny & Bros.7	Dumbarton	United Kingdom	For James Mills.
20 March	West Riding	Merchantman	Messrs. Dobie & Co.	Govan	United Kingdom	For Thomas Thompson.
23 March	Cornubia	Yacht	Messrs. Camper & Nicholson	Gosport	United Kingdom	For J. C. Kennerley.
23 March	Isle of Bute	Clipper	Messrs. John Reid & Co.	Port Glasgow	United Kingdom	For Messrs. John Marti & Co.
23 March	Mary Ellen	Paddle steamer	Messrs. R. Napier & Sons	Govan	United Kingdom	For Commissioners of St. George's Quay.
23 March	Somerset	Steamship	Messrs. Richardson, Ducky & Co.	Stockton-on-Tees	United Kingdom	For Great Western Steamship Company.
24 March	Tolka	Steamship	Messrs. Thomas Grendon & Co.	Drogheda	United Kingdom	For private owner.
24 March	Undine	Schooner	Joseph & Nicholas Butson	Polruan	United Kingdom	For Thomas Knight.
25 March	Lorna	Yacht	Messrs. Camper & Nicolson	Gosport	United Kingdom	For Samuel Morley.
26 March	Blairgowrie	Merchantman	Messrs. James & George Thomson	Dalmuir	United Kingdom	For Messrs Thomson & Gray.
27 March	Aldergrove	Merchantman	Messrs. Robert Duncan & Co.	Port Glasgow	United Kingdom	For Messrs. John Robb & Co.
March	Hesperides	Full-rigged ship	Short Bros.	Sunderland	United Kingdom	For J. Patton Jr. & Co.
3 April	Hetty	Steamship	Messrs. Raylton, Dixon & Co	Middlesbrough-on-Tees	United Kingdom	For Y. P. Hornung.
5 April	Gilroy	Merchantman	Messrs. John Elder & Co.	Govan	United Kingdom	For George Gilroy.
5 April	Vanquish	Mersey Flat	William Newall	Ellesmere Port	United Kingdom	For Messrs. W. & G. Alcock.
6 April	Abdiel	Steamship	Messrs. Aitken & Mansel	Glasgow	United Kingdom	For Messrs. Blythe Bros.
6 April	Llanelly	Steamship	W. Allsup & Sons	Preston	United Kingdom	For Llanelly & Liverpool Steam Shipping Co. Ltd.
7 April	Alexandra	Ironclad		Chatham Dockyard	United Kingdom	For Royal Navy.
8 April	Birker	Barque	Barrow Ship Building Co. Ltd.	Barrow-in-Furness	United Kingdom	For J. H. Bushby & Co.
8 April	Grisedale	Clipper	Messrs. W. H. Potter & Co.	Liverpool	United Kingdom	For Messrs. J. D. Newton & Co.
8 April	Karang	Steamship	Messrs. Caird & Co.	Greenock	United Kingdom	For Nederlandsch Indische Stoomboot Maatschappij.
8 April	Rovena	Steamship	Messrs. Lobnitz, Coulborn & Co.	Renfrew	United Kingdom	For private owner.
8 April	Stentor	Steamship	Messrs. Scott & Co.	Greenock	United Kingdom	For Mr. Holt.
9 April	Portland	Tug		Portland, Oregon	United States	For private owner.
9 April	Renfrewshire	Merchantman	Messrs. H. Murray & Co.	Port Glasgow	United Kingdom	For Messrs. Thomas Law & Co.
10 April	Abernyte	Merchantman	Messrs. M'Kellar, M'Millan & Co.	Dumbarton	United Kingdom	For Messrs. Burgess, Shaddick & Co.
10 April	Ekuro	Steamship	Messrs. Cunliffe & Dunlop	Port Glasgow	United Kingdom	For Messrs. Elder, Dempster & Co.
10 April	Messenger	Steamship	Messrs. Murdoch, Murray & Co	Port Glasgow	United Kingdom	For John Mair.
17 April	Sylphide	Steamship	Messrs. Archibald M'Millan & Son	Dumbarton	United Kingdom	For Messrs. A. C. Mohr & Son.
20 April	Windsor Castle	Steamship	Messrs. T. B. Seath & Co.	Rutherglen	United Kingdom	For Lochgoilhead Steamship Co.
21 April	Ravenspur	Steamship	Messrs. Richardson, Duck & Co.	South Stockton	United Kingdom	For private owner.
22 April	Camperdown	Clipper	Messrs. Alexander Stephen & Sons	Linthouse	United Kingdom	For David Bruce.
22 April	City of Venice	Steamship	Messrs. Barclay, Curle & Co.	Whiteinch	United Kingdom	For Messrs George Smith & Sons.
22 April	Espirito Santo	Steamship	Messrs. J. & G. Thomson	Dalmuir	United Kingdom	For Brazilian Steam Navigation Co.
24 April	Kate Helena	Merchantman	Messrs. William Gray & Co.	West Hartlepool	United Kingdom	For J. Bowen.
24 April	Medora	Schooner	Messrs. Camper & Nicholson	Gosport	United Kingdom	For Peter Reid.
24 April	Rosa Mary	Steamship	Messrs. William Gray & Co.	West Hartlepool	United Kingdom	For Messrs. Coverdale, Merryweather & Todd.
24 April	St. Aubin	Steamship	Messrs. Schlesinger, Davis & Co	Wallsend	United Kingdom	For Messrs. Hacquell Bros.
April	Jullanar	Yawl	Mr. Bentall	Haybridge	United Kingdom	For Edward Bentall.
April	Lactura	Clipper		River Clyde	United Kingdom	For New Zealand Shipping Company.
April	Little Willie	Schooner	David Banks & Co.	Plymouth	United Kingdom	For William Couch.
	Lombardian	Barque	Austin & Hunter	Sunderland	United Kingdom	For Tweddell & Harrison.
April	Miner	Miner-class torpedo boat	Messrs. Dudgeon	Cubitt Town	United Kingdom	For Royal Navy.
April	Ohio	Steamship	John F. Squires	Huron, Ohio	United States	For C. W. Elphicke.
3 May	Ayacanova	Yacht	Messrs. Camper & Nicholson	Gosport	United Kingdom	For Earl of Gosford.
3 May	Leonor Froncoso	Barquentine	Messrs. William Hamilton & Co.	Port Glasgow	United Kingdom	For Messrs. A. Timinez & Sons.
3 May	Lilian	Yacht	Ebenezer Robertson	Ipswich	United Kingdom	For H. A. Leverett.
3 May	Marques del Duero	Fernando el Catolico-class aviso		La Seyne-sur-Mer	France	For Spanish Navy.
4 May	Braemar	Steamship	Messrs. Hall, Russell & Co.	Footdee	United Kingdom	For Messrs. J. & A. Davidson.
5 May	Aboyne	Steamship	Messrs. John Duthie, Sons, & Co.	Footdee	United Kingdom	For Messrs. Adam & Co.
5 May	Majestic	Sailing ship	Harland & Wolff	Belfast	United Kingdom	For T. & J. Brocklebank.
5 May	Rosa	Steamship	Engineering and Shipbuilding Company Limited	Goole	United Kingdom	For private owner.
5 May	Seiki	corvette	Yokosuka Naval Arsenal	Yokosuka	Japan	For Imperial Japanese Navy.
5 May	Thomas Fisher	Schooner	Paul Rodgers	Carrickfergus	United Kingdom	For private owner.
6 May	Ben-my-Chree	Paddle steamer	Barrow Ship Building Co. Ltd	Barrow-in-Furness	United Kingdom	For Isle of Man Steam Packet Company.
6 May	Dunara Castle	Steamship	Messrs. Blackwood & Gordon	Port Glasgow	United Kingdom	For William Lang.
6 May	Union	Steamship	Messrs. Lobnitz, Coulborn & Co.	Renfrew	United Kingdom	For North Jutland Steamship Co.
6 May	Viceroy	Steamship	Messrs. David & William Henderson & Co.	Partick	United Kingdom	For Mr. Williamson.
7 May	Freja	Steamship	Messrs. Aitken & Mansel	Kelvinhaugh	United Kingdom	For L. N Johansen.
7 May	Salamis	Clipper	Messrs. Walter Hood & Co.	Aberdeen	United Kingdom	For Messrs. George Thompson Jr. & Co.
8 May	Aprhodite	Yacht	John Samuel White	Cowes	United Kingdom	For Mr Snowdon-Henry.
8 May	Philomene	Merchantman	T. R. Oswald	Sunderland	United Kingdom	For H. Fernie & Sons.
8 May	Valparaíso	Almirante Cochrane-class ironclad	Earle's Shipbuilding Co.	Hull	United Kingdom	For Chilean Navy.
8 May	Zante	Steamship	Messrs. Bowdler, Chaffer & Co	Seacombe	United Kingdom	For Messrs. Glynn & Co.
17 May	Holly	Steamship	Messrs. David & William Henderson & Co.	Partick	United Kingdom	For Messrs. Alexander A. Laird & Co.
18 May	Cara	Steam lighter	Messrs. H. Murray & Co.	Port Glasgow	United Kingdom	For Messrs. William Denny & Bros.
20 May	Chazalie	Steam yacht	Messrs. Camper & Nicholson	Portsmouth	United Kingdom	For Mrs Gerard Leigh, wife of the late John Gerard Leigh, who ordered the vessel.
20 May	Dalecaria	Full-rigged ship	Barrow Ship Building Co. Ltd.	Barrow-in-Furness	United Kingdom	For E. P. Bates.
20 May	Earl of Carrick	Steamship	Messrs. Hanna, Donald & Wilson	Paisley	United Kingdom	For George Clark.
20 May	Umballa	Steamship	Messrs. Caird & Co.	Greenock	United Kingdom	For British India Steam Navigation Company.
21 May	Arbutus	Steamship	Messrs. A. & J. Inglis	Pointhouse	United Kingdom	For Londonderry Steam Packet Company.
21 May	Pau-tah	Steamship	Messrs. William Denny & Bros.	Dumbarton	United Kingdom	For China Merchants Steam Navigation Company.
22 May	Dundee	Paddle steamer	Messrs. William Simons & Co.	Renfrew	United Kingdom	For Dundee Harbour Trust.
22 May	Queen Margaret	Steamship	London and Glasgow Shipbuilding Company	Govan	United Kingdom	For Queen Steamship Co.
24 May	Dunbritton	Barque	Messrs. Archibald M'Millan & Sons	Dumbarton	United Kingdom	For Messrs. W. H. Tucker & Co.
24 May	Dunskeig	Merchantman	Messrs. John Reid & Co.	Port Glasgow	United Kingdom	For Messrs. M'Kinnon, Frew & Co.
24 May	Larry Bane	Steamship	Messrs. J. Fullarton & Co.	Merksworth	United Kingdom	For F. L. Herdman.
24 May	Queen	Humber Keel	George Brown	Wilmington	United Kingdom	For Messrs. Edward Thompson & Sons.
25 May	Hibernian	Steamship	Messrs. H. Murray & Co.	Port Glasgow	United Kingdom	For Messrs. Paul & M'Kenzie.
25 May	Killeena	Barque	Messrs. D. & W. Henderson & Co.	Partick	United Kingdom	For Messrs. Kerr, Newton & Co.
May	Gazelle	Steam launch	Mr. Quinton	Needham Market	United Kingdom	For Mr. Quinton.
2 June	Picton Castle	Barque	Messrs. Alexander Stephen & Sons	Linthouse	United Kingdom	For Messrs. Simpson Bros.
3 June	Claud Hamilton	Paddle steamer	John Elder & Co.	Fairfield	United Kingdom	For Great Eastern Railway.
5 June	Blythswood	Merchantman	Messrs. Robert Duncan & Co.	Port Glasgow	United Kingdom	For Messrs. Robert Cuthbert & Co.
5 June	Campana	Barque	Messrs. R. & J. Evans & Co.	Liverpool	United Kingdom	For Messrs. George Bell & Co.
5 June	Ellida	Steam yacht	Ratsey	Cowes	United Kingdom	For E. M. Langworthy.
5 June	Jessie	Barque	Messrs. W. Gray & Co.	West Hartlepool	United Kingdom	For T. Bowen.
5 June	Lake Megantic	Steamship	London and Glasgow Shipbuilding Co.	Govan	United Kingdom	For Canada Shipping Co.
5 June	Swift	Steamship	Messrs. M. Pearse & Co	Stockton-on-Tees	United Kingdom	For private owner.
7 June	Orestes	Steamship	Messrs. Scott & Co.	Cartsdyke	United Kingdom	For Alfred Holt.
7 June	Panmure	Clipper	Messrs. Alexander Stephen & Sons	Linthouse	United Kingdom	For David Bruce.
7 June	Rajah	Steamship	Messrs. Henry Murray & Co.	Port Glasgow	United Kingdom	For Bornea Co.
8 June	Arawata	Steamship	Messrs. Thomas Wingate & Co.	Whiteinch	United Kingdom	For Messrs. M'Meckan, Blackwood & Co.
10 June	Mohawk	Schooner	J. B. & J. D. Van Deusen	Williamsburg, New York	United States	For William T. Garner.
15 June	Paris	Paddle Steamer	Messrs. John Elder & Co.	Govan	United Kingdom	For London, Brighton and South Coast Railway.
16 June	Mauricio	Paddle Steamer	Messrs. Alexander Stephen & Sons	Linthouse	United Kingdom	For private owner.
18 June	Sea Flower	Steamship	Messrs. John Reid & Co.	Port Glasgow	United Kingdom	For British Seaweed Co.
19 June	Adventurer	Barque	Messrs. Dobie & Co.	Govan	United Kingdom	For Messrs. Doward, Dickson & Co.
19 June	Bermejo	Arrow-class gunvessel	Messrs. Rennie	Greenwich	United Kingdom	For Argentine Navy.
19 June	The Syra	Steamship	Messrs. Turball & Sons	Whitby	United Kingdom	For private owner.
19 June	Thyra	Cutter	Fyfe	Fairlie	United Kingdom	For R. K. Holmes Kerr.
22 June	Brodick Castle	Merchantman	Messrs. Thomas Wingate & Co.	Whiteinch	United Kingdom	For Messrs. Thomas Skinner & Co.
22 June	Mary Jamieson	Brigantine	Messrs. R. Redway & Son	Dartmouth	United Kingdom	For Aberdeen, Newcastle and Hull Steam Packet Co.
22 June	Pollie, or Polly	Yacht	Messrs. Buckley & Sherlock	Tranmere	United Kingdom	For G. S. Wood.
23 June	East Croft	Barque	Harland & Wolff	Belfast	United Kingdom	For W. J. Gambles.
June	A. S. Davis	Merchantman	Columbus Carter	Belfast, Maine	United States	For A. S. Davis and others
June	Comariach	Yawl	Fyfe	Fairlie	United Kingdom	For Lord Midleton.
June	Myrtle Holme	Full-rigged ship	Bartram, Haswell & Co.	Sunderland	United Kingdom	For Hine Bros.
2 July	Perle	Sailing vessel (Schooner)	Arsenal de Brest	Brest	France	For French Navy
3 July	Athenian	Steamship		Liverpool	United Kingdom	For private owner.
3 July	Cassiope	Merchantma	Whitehaven Shipbuilding Co.	Whitehaven	United Kingdom	For Messrs. Joseph Heap & Sons.
3 July	Cimara	East Indiaman	Messrs. Charles Connell & Co.	Scotstoun	United Kingdom	For J. D. Clink.
3 July	Commonwealth	Merchantman	Messrs. Russell & Co.	Port Glasgow	United Kingdom	For C. H. Stewart.
3 July	Rio Lima	Gunboat	Messrs. Laird Bros.	Birkenhead	United Kingdom	For Portuguese Navy.
3 July	Saxon	Yacht	William Fyfe	Fairlie	United Kingdom	For Edward Collins.
5 July	Coromandel	East Indiaman	London and Glasgow Shipbuilding Co.	Govan	United Kingdom	For John Fairlie.
5 July	County of Peebles	Full-rigged ship	Barclay, Curle & Co.	Glasgow	United Kingdom	For R. & J. Craig.
5 July	Drumhendry	Steamship	Abercorn Shipbuilding Co.	Paisley	United Kingdom	For Mr. Duthie.
5 July	Frederic Franck	Steamship	Messrs. Lobnitz, Coulborn & Co.	Renfrew	United Kingdom	For private owner.
5 July	Luis de Cuadra	Steamship	Robert Thompson Jr.	Sunderland	United Kingdom	For Stephenson, Clarke & Co.
6 July	Blanche	Sailing barge	Mr. Frost	Mistley	United Kingdom	For Steam Saw Mills, Manningtree.
6 July	Cross Hill	Full-rigged ship	Messrs. Bowdler, Chaffer & Co.	Seacombe	United Kingdom	For Messrs. Hayton & Simpson.
7 July	Gambia	Steamship	Messrs. John Elder & Co.	Fairfield	United Kingdom	For British and African Steam Navigation Co.
7 July	Hoonona	Steamship	Messrs. H. Murray & Co.	Port Glasgow	United Kingdom	For Baltic Mining Co.
7 July	Merkara	Steamship	Messrs. William Denny & Bros.	Dumbarton	United Kingdom	For British India Steam Navigation Company.
7 July	Pernambuco	Steamship	Messrs. J. & G. Thomson	Dalmuir	United Kingdom	For Brazilian Steam Navigation Co.
8 July	Heather Bell	Fishing boat	Alexander L. Forsyth	Footdee	United Kingdom	For John Walker.
13 July	Starlight	Steamship	Messrs. William Swan & Son	Kelvindock	United Kingdom	For Messrs. Ross & Marshall.
14 July	Amana	Merchantman	Messrs. Alexander Stephen & Sons	Linthouse	United Kingdom	For John Smith.
19 July	Standard	Steamship	Messrs. Gray & Co.	West Hartlepool	United Kingdom	For Messrs. W. H. Wise & Son.
20 July	Œnone	East Indiaman	Messrs. John Reid & Co.	Port Glasgow	United Kingdom	For Messrs. W. & C. Battersby & Co.
21 July	Duke of Connaught	Paddle steamer	Barrow Ship Building Co. Ltd.	Barrow-in-Furness	United Kingdom	For Lancashire and Yorkshire Railway and London and North Western Railway.
21 July	Minnie	Brigantine	J. Cox	Bideford	United Kingdom	For Mr. Walters.
23 July	City of Carlisle	Merchantman	Messrs. Dobie & Co.	Govan	United Kingdom	For Peter Iredale.
27 July	Isle of Erin	Merchantman	Messrs. David & William Henderson & Co.	Partick	United Kingdom	For Samuel Martin.
July	Beneleuch	East Indiaman	Messrs. R. Steele & Co.	location	United Kingdom	For Messrs. William Thompson & Co.
July	Gauntlet	Ketch	Philip Bellot	Gorey	(United Kingdom of Great Britain and Ireland) Jersey	For Thomas Cabot.
July	Lilian Morris	Barque	William Doxford & Sons	Sunderland	United Kingdom	For T. Benyonn & Co.
July	Unnamed	Steamship	Messrs. Dobie & Co.	Govan	United Kingdom	Sold to Messs. Thomas Law & Co in August; named Morayshire by them.
1 August	Pietro Micca	Torpedo cruiser			Italy	For Regia Marina.
3 August	Bay of Bengal	East Indiaman	Messrs. John Elder & Co.	Govan	United Kingdom	For Messrs. J. & G. Bulloch & Co.
3 August	Blair Athole	Steam lighter	Abercorn Shipbuilding Co.	Paisley	United Kingdom	For Messrs. James Gardner & Sons.
3 August	H. von Witt	Steamship	Messrs. Cunliffe & Dunlop	Port Glasgow	United Kingdom	For Neue Dampfschiff Aktien Gesellschaft.
4 August	Baron Colonsay	East Indiaman	James E. Scott	Cartsdyke	United Kingdom	For Baronial Line.
4 August	Loch Vennachar	Full-rigged ship	J. & G. Thomson	Dalmuir	United Kingdom	For Loch Line.
4 August	Mallard	Forester-class gunvessel	Earle's Shipbuilding Co.	Hull	United Kingdom	For Royal Navy.
4 August	Zeal	Steamship	Messrs. Bowdler, Chaffer & Co.	Seacombe	United Kingdom	For Messrs. John Glynn & Son.
5 August	Abbey Town	Merchantman	Messrs. William Hamilton & Co.	Port Glasgow	United Kingdom	For Messrs. John Hay & Co.
5 August	Industry	Steamship	W. Simons & Co.	Renfrew	United Kingdom	For Sir John Coode.
5 August	Swallow	Steamship	Messrs. M. Pearse & Co	Stockton-on-Tees	United Kingdom	For private owner.
6 August	Akola	Steamship	Messrs. Caird & Co.	Greenock	United Kingdom	For British Steam Navigation Company (Limited).
6 August	Formosa	Barque	Messrs. Archibald M'Millan & Son	Dumbarton	United Kingdom	For Henry Flinn.
11 August	Gertrude	Merchantman	F. Evan	Frampton-on-Severn	United Kingdom	For Uriah Godsell.
12 August	E. C. Knight	Schooner	C. & R. Poillon	Brooklyn, New York	United States	For Delaware River Pilots.
13 August	Katie	Steamboat	Harland & Wolff	Belfast	United Kingdom	For ". Gossage & Sons.
14 August	Pilcomaijo	Bonetta-class sloop	Messrs. Rennie	Greenwich	United Kingdom	For Argentine Navy.
17 August	Connaught Ranger	Sailing ship	Harland & Wolff	Belfast	United Kingdom	For J. G. McCormick.
17 August	Guillemot	Cutter	John M'Lean	Ardrishaig	United Kingdom	For John Wingfield Malcolm.
17 August	Taiaroa	Steamship	A. & J. Inglis	Glasgow	United Kingdom	For Albion Shipping Co.
18 August	Emma Lawson	Steamship	Messrs. Turnbull & Son	Whitby	United Kingdom	For private owner.
18 August	Guiding Star	Schooner	John Banks Jr.	Kilpin Pike	United Kingdom	For John Banks Jr. & Joseph Wetherall.
18 August	Stanley Main	Steamship	Goole Engineering and Shipbuilding Company	Goole	United Kingdom	For Yorkshire Coal and Steam Shipping Company.
19 August	Clarence	Steamship	Messrs. Thomas Wingate & Co.	Whiteinch	United Kingdom	For Clarence and New England Steam Navigation Company.
19 August	Eastward	Schooner	Messrs. Scott & Macgill	Bowling	United Kingdom	For Donald M'Arthur.
19 August	Fungshun	Steamship	Messrs. William Denny & Bros.	Dumbarton	United Kingdom	For China Merchant Steam Navigation Company.
20 August	Commeyne	Barque	Messrs. Roy & Mitchle	Alloa	United Kingdom	For Messrs. Adam Pearson & Co.
21 August	Corolla	Clipper	Messrs. W. H. Potter & Co	Liverpool	United Kingdom	For Messrs. John Bell & Co.
21 August	Western Monarch	Full-rigged ship	Barrow Ship Building Co. Ltd.	Barrow-in-Furness	United Kingdom	For J. Patton Jr. & Co.
26 August	Alava	Steamship	Messrs. Cunliffe & Dulop	Port Glasgow	United Kingdom	For Marquis of Álava.
26 August	Llewelyn	Barque	Messrs. Alexander Stephen & Sons	Linthouse	United Kingdom	For John Rosser.
26 August	Sylph	Steamship	Messrs. Swan & Co.	Kelvindock	United Kingdom	For Messrs. Mories, Munro & Co.
28 August	Arctic	Barque	Messrs. David & William Henderson & Co.	Partick	United Kingdom	For Bernard R. Hennesay.
28 August	Iilimani	Barque	Messrs. Dobie & Co	Govan	United Kingdom	For James E. Burgess.
28 August	Jura	Merchantman	Messrs. Charles Connell & Co.	Scotstoun	United Kingdom	For Messrs. Sandbach, Tinne & Co.
31 August	Sierra Madrona	Full-rigged ship	Messrs. Richardson, Duck & Co.	Stockton-on-Tees	United Kingdom	For Messrs. Thompson, Anderson & Co.
August	Genoa	Steamship	Messrs. Mitchell & Co.	Newcastle upon Tyne	United Kingdom	For Messrs. Nelson, Donkin & Co.
August	Mabel	Schooner	Allix	Jersey	(United Kingdom of Great Britain and Ireland) Jersey	For Henry Shapland.
August	Mildred	Schooner	David Banks & Co.	Plymouth	United Kingdom	For William C. Phillips.
1 September	Ardvar	Barque	Messrs. Robert Duncah & Co.	Port Glasgow	United Kingdom	For T. O. Hunter and others.
1 September	Lord Clive	Paddle steamer	Messrs. Bowdler, Chaffer & Co.	Seacombe	United Kingdom	For Shropshire Union Railways and Canal Company.
1 September	Mensa Kari Kari9	Despatch boat	E. J. Reed	Jacob's Pill	United Kingdom	For private owner.
1 September	Tay	Steamship	Messrs. Barclay, Curle & Co.	Whiteinch	United Kingdom	For Carron Company.
1 September	Tien-sing	Ironclad	Kiangnan Arsenal		China	For the Imperial Chinese Navy.
3 September	Experiment	Dredger	Messrs. Aitken & Mansel	Kelvinhaugh	United Kingdom	For Millwall Dock Co.
4 September	Serica	Barque	Messrs. A. M'Millan & Son	Dumbarton	United Kingdom	For Henry Flinn.
7 September	Pontianak	Steamship	Messrs. Lobnitz & Coulborn	Renfrew	United Kingdom	For private owner.
9 September	Anita	Barquentine	Messrs. William Hamilton & Co.	Port Glasgow	United Kingdom	For Messrs. Berge, Silva & Co.
9 September	Nellie Martin	Steamship	Messrs. Raylton, Dixon & Co.	Middlesbrough	United Kingdom	For Star-Ball Line.
10 September	Gerzog Edinburgski	General-Admiral-class cruiser	Baltic Works	Saint Petersburg	Russia	For Imperial Russian Navy.
13 September	Leipzig	Leipzig-class corvette	AG Vulcan	Stettin	Germany	For Kaiserliche Marine.
13 September	Moorhen	Forester-class gunboat	Messrs. R. Napier & Sons	Govan	United Kingdom	For Royal Navy.
14 September	Emily Chaplin	Merchantman	Austin & Hunter	Sunderland	United Kingdom	For Moran & Sanderson.
14 September	Lady Penrhyn	Barque	Messrs. A. Stephens & Sons	Govan	United Kingdom	For private owners.
15 September	Colbert	Colbert-class ironclad	Arsenal de Brest	Brest	France	For French Navy.
15 September	Revolving Light	Barque	Gaius S. Turner	Harvey Bank	Canada	For private owner.
16 September	Ardmore	Merchantman	Messrs. Barclay, Curle & Co.	Whiteinch	United Kingdom	For Messrs. William Kidston & Sons.
16 September	Bay of Biscay	Merchantman	Messrs. John Elder & Co.	Fairfield	United Kingdom	For Bay Line.
16 September	Bay of Naples	East Indiaman	Messrs. Alexander Hall & Co.	Aberdeen	United Kingdom	For Bay Line.
16 September	City of Valparaiso	Steamship	Messrs. M. Pearse & Co.	Stockton-on-Tees	United Kingdom	For Messrs. Henry Bath & Son.
16 September	Nellie Martin	Steamship	Messrs. Raylton, Dixon & Co.	Middlesbrough	United Kingdom	For Messrs. J. B. Walker & Co.
17 September	Cristoforo Colombo	Corvette	Venice Naval Yard	Venice	Italy	For Regia Marina.
17 September	Grosser Kurfürst	Preussen-class ironclad	Kaiserliche Werft	Wilhelmshaven	Germany	For Kaiserliche Marine.
18 September	Aberlady	Barque	Messrs. Stenhouse & Co.	Dumbarton	United Kingdom	For Messrs. Burgess, Shaddick & Boyd.
18 September	Aberqueque	Combined tug and dredger	Messrs. W. Simons & Co	Renfrew	United Kingdom	For Indian Government.
18 September	Caerhun	Yacht	Griffiths	Caerhun	United Kingdom	For private owner.
18 September	Gouverneur Generaal Loudon	Steamship	Caird & Company	Greenock	United Kingdom	For Nederlandsch Indische Stoomboot Maatschappij.
21 September	Fiji	Full-rigged ship	Harland & Wolff	Belfast	United Kingdom	For W. J. Myers.
21 September	Tambaroora	Steamship	Messrs. Alexander Stephen & Sons	Linthouse	United Kingdom	For private owner.
28 September	Quinnebaug	Corvette	Neafie & Levy	Philadelphia Navy Yard	United States	For United States Navy.
29 September	Zingara	Steam yacht	Messrs. Robert Steele & Co.	Greenock	United Kingdom	For W. S. Dixon.
30 September	Palermo	Steamship	Messrs. M. Pearse & Co.	Stockton-on-Tees	United Kingdom	For private owner.
September	Castle Holme	Full-rigged ship	Bartram, Haswell & Co.	Sunderland	United Kingdom	For Hine Bros.
September	Hurnuiu	Merchantman	Messrs. Palmer	Jarrow-on-Tyne	United Kingdom	For New Zealand Shipping Company.
1 October	Commilla	Steamship	Messrs. A. & J. Inglis	Pointhouse	United Kingdom	For British India Steam Navigation Company.
2 October	Amelia	Steamship	Messrs. H. Murray & Co.	Port Glasgow	United Kingdom	For Messrs. H. L. Seligman & Co.
2 October	Luso	Steamship	Bowdler, Chaffer & Co.	Seacombe	United Kingdom	For Empreza Insulana de Navegacão.
2 October	Malvina	Steamship	Messrs. A M'Millan & Sons	Dumbarton	United Kingdom	For London and Edinburgh Shipping Co.
2 October	Naiad	Steamship	Messrs. William Swan & Son	Kelvindock	United Kingdom	For Messrs. Mories, Munro & Co.
4 October	Dorunda	Steamship	Messrs. William Denny & Bros.	Dumbarton	United Kingdom	For British India Steam Navigation Company.
4 October	Firth of Forth	Barque	Messrs. M'Kellar, M'Millan & Co	Dumbarton	United Kingdom	For L. Macpherson.
7 October	Vitse-admiral Popov	Monitor	Nikolaev Admiralty Shipyard	Nikolaev	Russia	For the Imperial Russian Navy
12 October	Douglas	Steamship	Messrs. Murdoch & Murray	Port Glasgow	United Kingdom	For Messrs. Dunsmuir, Muir & Co.
16 October	Georgina	Steamship	Messrs. William Gray & Co.	West Hartlepool	United Kingdom	For J. Bowen.
16 October	Mindello	Corvette	Messrs. R. & H. Green	Blackwall	United Kingdom	For Portuguese Navy.
16 October	Mitredale	Clipper	Messrs. W. H. Potter & Co.	Liverpool	United Kingdom	For Messrs. J. D. Newton & Co.
16 October	Rainha de Portugal	Corvette	Messrs. R. & H. Green	Blackwall	United Kingdom	For Portuguese Navy.
18 October	Alfonso XII	Steamship	Messrs. William Denny & Bros.	Dumbarton	United Kingdom	For Messrs. A. Lopez & Co.
18 October	Zealandia	Steamship	Messrs. John Elder & Co.	Fairfield	United Kingdom	For private owner.
19 October	Boadicea	Bacchante-class corvette		Portsmouth Dockyard	United Kingdom	For Royal Navy.
25 October	Don Juan d'Austria	Kaiser Max class	Stabilimento Tecnico Triestino	Trieste	Austria-Hungary	For Austro-Hungarian Navy.
30 October	Malleable	Steamship	Messrs. M. Pearse & Co	Stockton-on-Tees	United Kingdom	For private owner.
28 October	Anchoria	Steamship	Barrow Ship Building Co. Ltd.	Barrow-in-Furness	United Kingdom	For Barrow Steam Ship Co. Ltd.
30 October	Rowland	Steamship	Bartram, Haswell & Co	Sunderland	United Kingdom	For R. Mawson Kendrick & Co.
30 October	Torrens	Full-rigged ship	James Laing	Sunderland	United Kingdom	For Henry Robert Angel and others.
30 October	Tourmaline	Emerald-class corvette	Raylton, Dixon & Co.	Middlesbrough	United Kingdom	For Royal Navy.
30 October	Zuleika	Merchantman	Messrs. Aitken & Mansel	Whiteinch	United Kingdom	For John A. Simpson.
October	Excelsior	Schooner	Charles W. Aubin	Jersey	(United Kingdom of Great Britain and Ireland) Jersey	For private owner.
October	First Lancashire	Barque	Osbourne, Graham & Co	Sunderland	United Kingdom	For William H. Oven.
2 November	Duart Bay	Clipper	Messrs. A. M'Millan & Son	Dumbarton	United Kingdom	For Bay Line.
2 November	Martha Fisher	Barque	Messrs. Alexander Stephen & Sons	Linthouse	United Kingdom	For Peter Iredale.
4 November	Princess Beatrice	Paddle Steamer	Harland & Wolff	Belfast	United Kingdom	For Larne & Stranraer Ferry Company.
9 November	Mary	Lighter	Messrs. William Swan & Son	Kelvindock	United Kingdom	For John White.
9 November	Yaralla	Steamship	Messrs. Lobnitz, Coulborn & Co.	Renfrew	United Kingdom	For Australasian Steam Navigation Co.
10 November	Blair Hoyle	Merchantman	Messrs. Charles Connell & Co.	Scotstoun	United Kingdom	For Messrs. Thompson & Gray.
11 November	Shannon	Cruiser		Pembroke Dockyard	United Kingdom	For Royal Navy.
13 November	Dunrobin Castle	Steamship	Messrs. Robert Napier & Sons	Govan	United Kingdom	For Castle Line.
13 November	Gliding Star	Brig	Redway	Exmouth	United Kingdom	For private owner.
13 November	Julia Percy	Steamship	Messrs. Thomas Wingate & Co.	Whiteinch	United Kingdom	For Messrs. Robinson & Lilly.
13 November	Quiolatta	Merchantman	Messrs. W. H. Potter & Co.	Liverpool	United Kingdom	For Messrs. S. Wakeham & Son.
13 November	Wairoa	Merchantman	Messrs. Palmers	Jarrow	United Kingdom	For New Zealand Shipping Company.
15 November	Australia	Steamship	Messrs. John Elder & Co.	Govan	United Kingdom	For private owner.
15 November	Branksome Hall	Steamship	London and Glasgow Shipbuilding Company (Limited)	Glasgow	United Kingdom	For Hall Line.
15 November	Tamega	Gunboat	Messrs. Laird Bros.	Birkenhead	United Kingdom	For Portuguese Navy.
16 November	Memdonhic	Ironclad	Thames Ironworks and Shipbuilding Company	Blackwall	United Kingdom	For Ottoman Navy.
16 November	Superb	Ironclad	Thames Ironworks and Shipbuilding Company	Leamouth	United Kingdom	For Royal Navy.
16 November	Trafalgar	Merchantman	James E. Scott	Cartsdyke	United Kingdom	For Messrs. Donaldson, Rose & Co.
17 November	Sin Nanzing	Steamship	Messrs. John Elder & Co.	Govan	United Kingdom	For Messrs. Matheson & Co.
18 November	Victorieuse	La Galissonnière-class ironclad		Toulon	United Kingdom	For French Navy.
27 November	Europa	Merchantman	Messrs. Dobie & Co.	Govan	United Kingdom	For J. Thesen & Co.
29 November	Roll Call	Steamship	J. Readhead & Co.	South Shields	United Kingdom	For Newcomb & Thompson.
30 November	Peruvian	Barque	Messrs. David & William Henderson & Co.	Partick	United Kingdom	For Messrs. Donaldson Bros.
30 November	Primera	Barque	Messrs. Alexander Stephen & Sons	Linthouse	United Kingdom	For William Sherwen.
30 November	Strathleven	Steamship	Messrs. Blackwood & Gordon	Port Glasgow	United Kingdom	For Messrs. Burrell & Son.
November	Ibis	Brigantine		Prince Edward Island	Canada	For private owner.
1 December	Vasco da Gama	Ironclad	Thames Ironworks and Shipbuilding Company	Blackwall	United Kingdom	For Portuguese Navy.
1 December	Wanlock	Barque	London and Glasgow Shipbuilding Co.	Glasgow	United Kingdom	For Robert Bramwell.
11 December	Langdale	Steamship	James Laing	Sunderland	United Kingdom	For W. H. Dixon.
13 December	Ascupart	Steamship	Messrs. M. Pearse & Co	Stockton-on-Tees	United Kingdom	For private owner.
15 December	Rose	Paddle steamer	Messrs. Laird Bros.	Birkenhead	United Kingdom	For London and North Western Railway.
28 December	Kaiser Max	Kaiser Max class	Stabilimento Tecnico Triestino	Trieste	Austria-Hungary	For Austro-Hungarian Navy.
28 December	Madeleine	Three-masted vessel of 400 tons	Chantiers de Granville	Granville	France	For: MM Beust père et fils
29 December	Northern Monarch	Clipper	Messrs. Archibald M'Millan & Son	Dumbarton	United Kingdom	For Royal Exchange Shipping Co.
30 December	Sado	Gunboat	Messrs. Laird Bros.	Birkenhead	United Kingdom	For Portuguese Navy.
December	Pizarro	Barque	Harland & Wolff	Belfast	United Kingdom	For W. J. Myers.
Unknown date	Aarhus	Barque		Hamburg	Germany	For private owner.
Unknown date	Abbey Cowper	Merchantman	William Doxford & Sons	Sunderland	United Kingdom	For J. Hay & Co.
Unknown date	Abercarne	Merchantman	Messrs. Richardson, Duck & Co	Stockton-on-Tees	United Kingdom	For private owner.
Unknown date	Ada K. Damon	Schooner	H. A. Burnham	Essex, Massachusetts	United States	For A. K. Brewster.
Unknown date	Adler	Barque			Germany	For private owner.
Unknown date	Agnes	Schooner	Edward Davis	Brisbane Water	New South Wales	For Alex Kethel.
Unknown date	Aikshaw	Barque	William Doxford & Sons	Sunderland	United Kingdom	For E. W. Dyson.
Unknown date	Ajeca	Merchantman	William Pickersgill	Sunderland	United Kingdom	For A. & A. Suter.
Unknown date	Alastor	Barque	Iliff & Monsey	Sunderland	United Kingdom	For R. H. Penney.
Unknown date	Albert Brown	Tug			United States	For private owner.
Unknown date	Aldborough	Merchantman	Messrs. Richardson, Duck & Co	Stockton-on-Tees	United Kingdom	For private owner.
Unknown date	Allendale	Merchantman	James Laing	Sunderland	United Kingdom	For W. H. Dixon and T. Wilso.
Unknown date	Alpheta	Barque	Mounsey & Foster	Sunderland	United Kingdom	For R. H. Penney.
Unknown date	Anne Leslie	Merchantman	J. Gardner	Sunderland	United Kingdom	For P. L. Smith.
Unknown date	Antares	Merchantman	Mounsey & Foster	Sunderland	United Kingdom	For R. H. Penney.
Unknown date	Antofagasta	Merchantman	William Doxford & Sons	Sunderland	United Kingdom	For Tomlinson, Hodgett & Co.
Unknown date	Assari-Nasret	Frigate		Golden Horn	Ottoman Empire	For Ottoman Navy.
Unknown date	Autocrat	Merchantman	William Doxford & Sons	Sunderland	United Kingdom	For T. Day.
Unknown date	Bann	Full-rigged ship	T. R. Oswald	Sunderland	United Kingdom	For James Nourse.
Unknown date	Baron Osy	Paddle steamer	Mitchell & Co.	Low Walker	United Kingdom	For private owner.
Unknown date	Baton Rouge	Survey ship	S. D. Bardmore	Louisville, Kentucky	United States	For United States Coast Survey.
Unknown date	Bayadère	Merchantman	N. Gibbon	Sunderland	United Kingdom	For A. Levive.
Unknown date	Beecroft	Full-rigged ship	T. R. Oswald	Sunderland	United Kingdom	For Hargrove, Ferguson & Jackson.
Unknown date	Belle of Benin	Merchantman	George S. Gulston	Sunderland	United Kingdom	For G. Eastee.
Unknown date	Bessemer	Paddle steamer	Earle's Shipbuilding Co.	Kingston upon Hull	United Kingdom	For Sir Henry Bessemer.
Unknown date	Bowden	Merchantman	T. R. Oswald	Sunderland	United Kingdom	For Hargrove, Ferguson & Jackson.
Unknown date	Britannia	Merchantman	Osbourne, Graham & Co	Sunderland	United Kingdom	For Hamilton Bros.
Unknown date	Camara	Merchantman	Alfred Simey & Co	Sunderland	United Kingdom	For Vinuesa & Co.
Unknown date	Campanero	Merchantman	N. Gibbon	Sunderland	United Kingdom	For Fould & Bourne.
Unknown date	Carbet Castle	Merchantman	Mounsey & Foster	Sunderland	United Kingdom	For L. H. MacIntyre & Co.
Unknown date	Cardiff	Steamship		Wallsend	United Kingdom	For private owner.
Unknown date	Carlotta	Merchantman	"W Richardson	Sunderland	United Kingdom	For R. Beckwith.
Unknown date	Catherine Griffith	Merchantman	William Pickersgill	Sunderland	United Kingdom	For G. Griffith.
Unknown date	Cecilia	Fishing trawler	Edwin Barter	Brixham	United Kingdom	For Edward P Dashwood and others.
Unknown date	Champion	Merchantman	T. R. Oswald	Sunderland	United Kingdom	For H. Fernie & Sons.
Unknown date	Clan Campbell	Merchantman	Bartram, Haswell & Co.	Sunderland	United Kingdom	For T. Dunlop & Sons.
Unknown date	Croft	Merchantman	Joseph L. Thompson	Sunderland	United Kingdom	For Dent, Hodgson & Co.
Unknown date	Delscey	Barque	William Doxford & Sons	Sunderland	United Kingdom	For Shalcross & Higham.
Unknown date	Deveronside	Full-rigged ship	Messrs. A. & J. Inglis	Pointhouse	United Kingdom	For private owner.
Unknown date	Devonshire	Merchantman	James Laing	Sunderland	United Kingdom	For W. Milnes.
Unknown date	Diomedea	Merchantman	James Laing	Sunderland	United Kingdom	For G. Porteous.
Unknown date	Ebenezer	Merchantman	Dunn	Sunderland	United Kingdom	For W. Harty & Co.
Unknown date	Eden Holme	Barque	Bartram, Haswell & Co.	Sunderland	United Kingdom	For Hine Bros.
Unknown date	Elizabeth	Fishing trawler	Edwin Barter	Brixham	United Kingdom	For Samuel W. Lewis.
Unknown date	Ellen Holt	Merchantman	W. Richardson	Sunderland	United Kingdom	For Lancashire Shipping Co. Ltd.
Unknown date	Erith	Schooner	Blumer & Co	Sunderland	United Kingdom	For W. H. Crooks & Co.
Unknown date	Eschol	Merchantman	James Laing	Sunderland	United Kingdom	For Middleton & Co.
Unknown date	Ethel	Merchantman	Robert Thompson Jr.	Sunderland	United Kingdom	For J. Russell.
Unknown date	Euphony	Barque	J. Crown	Sunderland	United Kingdom	For J. Ditchburn.
Unknown date	Folke	Hildur-class monitor	Motala Verkstad	Norrköping	Sweden	For Royal Swedish Navy.
Unknown date	Fylde	Merchantman	Richard Thompson	Sunderland	United Kingdom	For H. Hall & Co.
Unknown date	George Watson	Merchantman	N. Gibbon	Sunderland	United Kingdom	For G. Watson & Sons.
Unknown date	Gilroy	Merchantman	John Elder	Glasgow	United Kingdom	For Nourse Line.
Unknown date	Glannibata	Collier	Joseph L. Thompson	Sunderland	United Kingdom	For Bell & Symonds.
Unknown date	Glen Ville	Merchantman	N. Gibbon	Sunderland	United Kingdom	For A. Meek & Co.
Unknown date	Gloria	Merchantman	William Doxford & Sons	Sunderland	United Kingdom	For Olano, Larrinaga & Co.
Unknown date	Granville	Merchantman	N. Gibbon	Sunderland	United Kingdom	For J. Davies & Co.
Unknown date	Halley	Merchantman	Bartram, Haswell & Co.	Sunderland	United Kingdom	For Wilkie & Turnbull.
Unknown date	Haytian	Merchantman	James Laing	Sunderland	United Kingdom	For West India & Pacific Steam Navigation Co.
Unknown date	Helvetia	Paddle steamer		Lake Zurich	Switzerland	For Schweizerische Nordostbahn.
Unknown date	Hinemoa	Lighthouse tender	Robert Scott & Co.	Cartsdyke	United Kingdom	For New Zealand Government.
Unknown date	Hospodar	Full-rigged ship	T. R. Oswald	Sunderland	United Kingdom	For John Hargrove and others.
Unknown date	Huron	Alert-class gunboat	John Roach & Sons	Chester, Pennsylvania	United States	For United States Navy.
Unknown date	Ifafa	Barque	J. Crown	Sunderland	United Kingdom	For John Thomson Rennie.
Unknown date	Indiana	Merchantman	J. E. Scott	Cartsdyle	United Kingdom	For private owner.
Unknown date	Jamaica	Merchantman	William Doxford & Sons	Sunderland	United Kingdom	For R. Denniston & Co.
Unknown date	J. B. Eminson	Merchantman	Short Bros.	Sunderland	United Kingdom	For J. O. Clazey.
Unknown date	Karo	Merchantman	Mounsey & Foster	Sunderland	United Kingdom	For David G. Pinkney & Son.
Unknown date	Kezziah P.	Merchantman	N. Gibbon	Sunderland	United Kingdom	For private owner.
Unknown date	Kingdom of Sweden	Merchantman	Mounsey & Foster	Sunderland	United Kingdom	For Gosman & Smith.
Unknown date	Lady Aline	Merchantman	James Ling	Sunderland	United Kingdom	For Marquess of Londonderry.
Unknown date	Lady Eleanor	Steamship	George S. Gulston	Sunderland	United Kingdom	For Earl of Durham.
Unknown date	Lalla Rookh	Ketch		Bellinger River	New South Wales	For Aplin Brown & Company.
Unknown date	Lartington	Merchantman	Short Bros.	Sunderland	United Kingdom	For J. S. Barwick & Co.
Unknown date	Lily	Yacht	Messrs. Buckley & Sherlock	Tranmere	United Kingdom	For private owner.
Unknown date	Lucia A. Simpson	Schooner	Rand & Burger	Manitowoc, Wisconsin	United States	For Simpson & Co.
Unknown date	Maid of Aln	Merchantman	J. Gardner	Sunderland	United Kingdom	For W. Gardner & Co.
Unknown date	Marie	Paddle tug	George Butchard	Gravesend	United Kingdom	For G. Butchard.
Unknown date	Millie	Steamboat	Harland & Wolff	Belfast	United Kingdom	For W. Gossage & Sons.
Unknown date	Mountaineer	Merchantman	William Doxford & Sons	Sunderland	United Kingdom	For G. N. Gardner & Co.
Unknown date	Nelson	Paddle steamer	W. Allsup & Sons	Preston	United Kingdom	For South Blackpool Jetty Co. Ltd.
Unknown date	Orari	Steamship	Messrs. Palmer's	Jarrow	United Kingdom	For New Zealand Shipping Company.
Unknown date	Olaf	Steamship	Messrs. Lobnitz, Coulborn & Co.	Renfrew	United Kingdom	For private owner.
Unknown date	Oregon	Merchantman	Mounsey & Foster	Sunderland	United Kingdom	For Welch & Rollo.
Unknown date	Orient	Sternwheeler	John J. Holland	The Dalles, Oregon	United States	For Willamette River Transportation Co.
Unknown date	Ours	Merchantman	Robert Thompson Jr,.	Sunderland	United Kingdom	For Culliford & Clark.
Unknown date	Our Son	Schooner			United States	For private owner.
Unknown date	Paz	Steamship	Robert Thompson	Sunderland	United Kingdom	For E. Lund.
Unknown date	Parthinia	Merchantman	J. E. Scott	Cartsdyle	United Kingdom	For private owner.
Unknown date	Penshaw	Barque	J. Crown	Sunderland	United Kingdom	For J. Crown.
Unknown date	Plover	Merchantman	Mounsey & Foster	Sunderland	United Kingdom	For General Steam Navigation Company.
Unknown date	Ramon	Merchantman	Blumer & Co	Sunderland	United Kingdom	For U. de Undaza.
Unknown date	Rândunica	Torpedo boat	Yarrow and Company	Poplar	United Kingdom	For Romanian Navy.
Unknown date	Reliance	Steamship	W. Allsup & Sons	Preston	United Kingdom	For Laxey Steamship Co. Ltd.
Unknown date	Ringarooma	Steamship	Messrs. Thomas Wingate & Co.	Whiteinch	United Kingdom	For Messrs. M'Meeking, Blackwood & Co.
Unknown date	Rügenwalde	Merchantman	Short Bros.	Sunderland	United Kingdom	For Hemptenmacher & Co.
Unknown date	Ruth Topping	Merchantman	W. Richardson	Sunderland	United Kingdom	For Lancashire Shipping Co.
Unknown date	Sagunto	Steamship	John Readhead & Sons Ltd.	South Shields	United Kingdom	For private owner.
Unknown date	Salvadora	Merchantman	William Doxford & Sons	Sunderland	United Kingdom	For Cuculla & Co.
Unknown date	Scottish Chief	Barque	Blumer & Co.	Sunderland	United Kingdom	For D. Park.
Unknown date	Sierra Morena	Merchantman	T. R. Oswald	Sunderland	United Kingdom	For Thompson, Anderson & Co.
Unknown date	Sindbad	Merchantman	Robert Thompson Jr.	Sunderland	United Kingdom	For Swansea Shipping Co.
Unknown date	Solimões	Javary-class monitor	Société Nouvelle des Forges et Chantiers de la Méditerranée	La Seyne-sur-Mer	France	For Imperial Brazilian Navy.
Unknown date	Sölve	Hildur-class monitor	Ericsson-D'Ailly		Sweden	For Royal Swedish Navy.
Unknown date	Southella	Merchantman	Blumer & Co.	Sunderland	United Kingdom	For Jackson, Beaumont & Co.
Unknown date	State of Florida	Steamship		River Clyde	United Kingdom	For private owner.
Unknown date	Spinaway	Barque	Richard Thompson	Sunderland	United Kingdom	For private owner.
Unknown date	Swaledale	Merchantman	Short Bros.	Sunderland	United Kingdom	For Milburn Bros.
Unknown date	Syracuse	Merchantman	James Laing	Sunderland	United Kingdom	For R. T. Nicholson.
Unknown date	Tartessus	Merchantman	Alfred Simey & Co.	Sunderland	United Kingdom	For H. F. Wilcox.
Unknown date	Tay	Steam barge	Messrs. Richardson, Duck & Co	Stockton-on-Tees	United Kingdom	For private owner.
Unknown date	The Frederick	Merchantman	Osbourne, Graham & Co.	Sunderland	United Kingdom	For J. N. Ward & Co.
Unknown date	Thomas D. Harrison	Schooner	J. S. Ellis & Son	New York	United Kingdom	For New Jersey Pilots.
Unknown date	Thomas R. Gedney	Survey ship	C. H. Decameter	New York	United States	For United States Coast Survey.
Unknown date	Triumph	Paddle tug	George Butchard	Gravesend	United Kingdom	For J. Williams.
Unknown date	Vanda	Steam yacht	Bewley, Webb & Co.	Dublin	United Kingdom	For J. F. Bewley.
Unknown date	Victoria	Merchantman	William Doxford & Sons	Sunderland	United Kingdom	For Olano, Larrinaga & Co.
Unknown date	W. H. Watson	Merchantman	Short Bros.	Sunderland	United Kingdom	For W. H. Watson & Son.
Unknown date	William Frederick Havemeyer	Fireboat			United States	For City of New York authorities.
Unknown date	Woollahra	Barque	Osbourne, Graham & Co.	Sunderland	United Kingdom	For Cowlishaw Bros.
Unknown date	Yembo	Steamship	James Laing	Sunderland	United Kingdom	For David G. Pinkney and others.
Unknown date	Zulu Chief	Merchantman	Richard Thompson	Sunderland	United Kingdom	For J. Thomson & Co.
