= List of monitors of the Swedish Navy =

Ships of the
Swedish Navy
Capital ships
Coastal defence ships
Corvettes
Cruisers
Destroyers
Frigates
Mine warfare vessels
Monitors
Patrol vessels
Gunboats
Sloops of war
Submarines
Torpedo boats

This is a list of Swedish monitors from the ironclads era.

== Classes of Monitors ==
- John Ericsson class
  - HSwMS John Ericsson (1865) - sold in 1919
  - HSwMS Thordön (1865) - sold in 1922
  - HSwMS Tirfing (1866) - Sold for scrap in 1922
  - HSwMS Loke (1869) - scrapped in 1908
- HSwMS Garmer (1867) - sold for scrap in 1893
- HSwMS Sköld (1868) - sunk as a target in 1907
- HSwMS Fenris (1872) - retired in 1903
- Hildur class
  - HSwMS Hildur (1872) - sold in 1919
  - HSwMS Gerda (1872) - retired in 1919
  - HSwMS Ulf (1873) - sold in 1919
  - HSwMS Berserk (1874) - sold in 1919
  - HSwMS Björn (1874) - sold in 1919
  - HSwMS Sölve (1875) - sold in 1919
  - HSwMS Folke (1875) - decommissioned in 1919

== See also ==
- List of ironclads
