= Bojerud =

Bojerud is a surname. Notable people with the surname include:

- Fredrik Bojerud (born 1970), Swedish politician
- Stellan Bojerud (1944–2015), Swedish politician
