= HSwMS Fenris =

History

Sweden
- Name: Fenris
- Owner: Swedish Navy
- Builder: Motala Verkstad, Norrköping
- Laid down: 1871
- Launched: 1872
- In service: 1872–1903
- Out of service: 1903
- Fate: Sold

General characteristics
- Class & type: John Ericsson-class monitor
- Displacement: 260 t (260 long tons)
- Length: 31.1 m (102 ft 0 in)
- Beam: 6.1 m (20 ft 0 in)
- Draft: 2.31 m (7 ft 7 in)
- Installed power: 42 ihp (31 kW)
- Propulsion: 1x Bergsunds steam engine
- Speed: 6 knots (11 km/h; 6.9 mph)
- Crew: 25
- Armament: 1 x 15 in (380 mm) Dahlgren gun
- Armor: Belt: 2.5–5 in (63.5–127.0 mm); Gun turret: 4–10.2 in (101.6–259.1 mm); Deck: 7 in (17.8 cm); Conning tower: 8 in (20.3 cm)

HSwMS Fenris was a monitor that served with the Swedish Navy from 1872 to 1903. She was an experimental small coastal defense monitor and while not seen as a success, experience gained in her development was used in the later Sölve class of monitors. Despite being of the John Ericsson class, she was closest in design to HSwMS Garmer.

== Design ==
Fenris was 31.1 metres (102 ft) long by 6.1 metres (20 ft) at her widest point, she displaced 260 tons, and had a crew of 25. She had a coal capacity of nine tons and her propulsion system generated 44 indicated horsepower, with one propeller and one funnel. She was armed with a single 15-inch (381 mm) M/65 Dahlgren gun.

=== Armor ===
The thickness of the belt armor and the turret armor varied, from 6.4 to 12.7 centimetres (2.5 to 5 in) and 10.2 to 25.9 centimetres (4 to 10.2 in), respectively. However the armor of the conning tower and deck were consistently armored at 20.3 centimetres (8 in) and 17.8 centimetres (7 in), respectively.

== History ==
Construction of Fenris began in the Norrköping shipyard of engineering company Motala Verkstad in 1871 and she began her service the following year.

== Bibliography ==
- Campbell, N. J. M. (1979). "Sweden". In Chesneau, Roger & Kolesnik, Eugene M. (eds.). Conway's All the World's Fighting Ships 1860–1905. Greenwich: Conway Maritime Press. pp. 360–363. ISBN 0-8317-0302-4.
