= HSwMS Berserk =

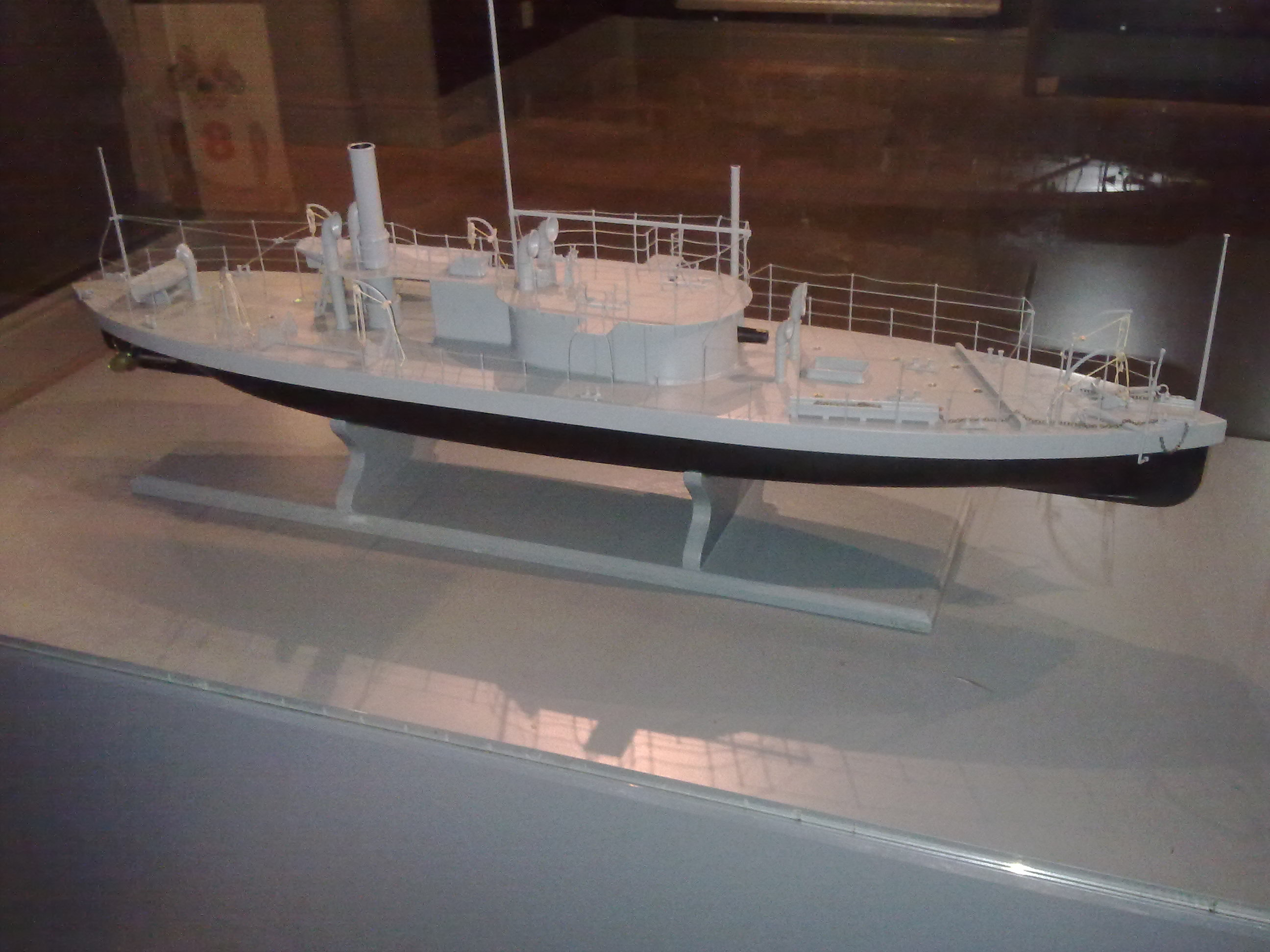
- Model of Hildur, the lead ship of the class

History

Sweden
- Name: Berserk
- Owner: Swedish Navy
- Builder: Motala Verkstad, Norrköping
- Launched: 1 January 1874
- Decommissioned: 1 January 1919
- In service: 1874–1919

General characteristics
- Class & type: Hildur-class monitor
- Displacement: 460 t (450 long tons) (deep load)
- Length: 39.78 m (130 ft 6 in)
- Beam: 8.72 m (28 ft 7 in)
- Draft: 2.7 m (8 ft 10 in)
- Installed power: 2 cylindrical boilers; 155 ihp (116 kW)
- Propulsion: 2 shafts, 2 horizontal-return connecting-rod steam engines
- Speed: 8 knots (15 km/h; 9.2 mph)
- Complement: 48
- Armament: 1 × 240 mm (9.4 in) gun
- Armor: Belt: 76 mm (3 in); Gun turret: 356–418 mm (14.0–16.5 in); Deck: 19 mm (0.7 in); Conning tower: 254 mm (10 in)

HSwMS Berserk was one of seven Hildur-class monitors monitors built for the Swedish Navy in the mid-1870s. The ship had an uneventful career and was sold in 1919 for conversion into a fuel oil barge.

== Design and description ==
The Hildur-class monitors were designed for the defense of Lake Mälaren and the Stockholm archipelago. The ships were 39.78 meters (130 ft 6 in) long overall and had a beam of 8.72 meters (28 ft 7 in). They had a draft of 2.7 meters (8 ft 10 in) and displaced 460 metric tons (450 long tons). Berserk's crew numbered 48 officers and men. The ship had rudders at bow and stern.

Berserk had a pair of two-cylinder horizontal-return connecting-rod steam engines, each driving a single propeller using steam from two cylindrical boilers. The engines produced a total of 155 indicated horsepower (116 kW) which gave the monitors a maximum speed of 8 knots (15 km/h; 9.2 mph). Hildurs carried 23–25 metric tons (23–25 long tons) of coal.

The monitors were equipped with one 240-millimeter (9.4 in) M/69 rifled breech loader, mounted in a long, fixed, oval-shaped gun turret. They were rearmed with a 120-millimeter (4.7 in) quick-firing gun as well as three 57-millimeter (2.2 in) quick-firing guns sometime in the 1890s or the early 1900s.

The Hildur class had a complete waterline armor belt of wrought iron that was 76 millimeters (3 in) thick with a 19-millimeter (0.7 in) deck. The face of the gun turret was protected by 418 millimeters (16.5 in) of armor, while its sides were 356 millimeters (14 in) thick. The conning tower protruded from the top of the turret and was protected by 254 millimeters (10 in) of armor.

== Construction and service ==
Berserk was launched in 1875 by Motala Verkstad at Norrköping. She was sold in 1919 and converted into an oil barge.

== Bibliography ==
- Bojerud, Stellan (1986). "Monitors and Armored Gunboats of the Royal Swedish Navy, Part 1". Warship International. XXIII (2). International Naval Records Organization: 167–180. ISSN 0043-0374.
- Campbell, N. J. M. (1979). "Sweden". In Chesneau, Roger & Kolesnik, Eugene M. (eds.). Conway's All the World's Fighting Ships 1860–1905. Greenwich: Conway Maritime Press. pp. 360–363. ISBN 0-8317-0302-4.
- Harris, Daniel G. (1994). "The Swedish Monitors". In Roberts, John (ed.). Warship 1994. Annapolis, Maryland: Naval Institute Press. pp. 22–34. ISBN 1-55750-903-4.
