= Revolving Light =

British barque

History

United Kingdom
- Name: Revolving Light
- Out of service: 19 December 1902
- Fate: wrecked at Texel, the Netherlands on 18 December 1902

General characteristics
- Type: Barque
- Tonnage: 1,338 ton
- Length: 196 ft (60 m)
- Crew: 17

Revolving Light sometimes written as Revolvinglight was a barque launched from the Turner Shipyard in Harvey Bank, New Brunswick on 15 September 1875. The ship was 196 feet (60 m) long and had a tonnage of 1,338 tons. The ship was the first ship of the Turner Shipyard of Gaius Samuel Turner.

She was a merchant ship and sailed for 27 years across the world.

== Fate ==
In December 1902 the ship with a cargo of bones was sailing with captain Helgesen, from Buenos Aires via IJmuiden, the Netherlands to Hamburg, Germany. On 18 December she was towed by “Gebr. Wrede” from IJmuiden through the tricky channels off the Dutch coastal islands. During an unexpected storm she floundered on a sandbar near Texel between De Koog and Eierland. Tugboat Gebr. Wrede arrived at Texel with 16 rescued crew members, one crew member was killed. The ship was in Dutch newspapers reported as a Norwegian ship.

== Aftermath and legacy ==
Various items from the ship washed ashore including: a sailor's chest, toys, cow horns, Koehorens sloop, paper from the ship's logbook and small wreckage. Later in month, on 27 December 1902 the ship was completely destroyed during a storm. In February 1903, found items were sold publicly.

=== 1952 exposure ===
Fifty years after the ship wrecked, after heavy winds in 1952, the wreckage was exposed again on the beach.

=== Farmhouses ===
In Texel farmhouses were built with beams of the ship. These kinds of farmhouses needed big timber beams creating a square of around 6.5 metres (21 ft) high, on which the full weight of the roof rested. Later research into these beams showed that they came indeed from the three-masted Revolving Light from the Turner Shipyard in Harvey Bank. As of 2002 farmhouses like these still exist.

=== Replica of the vessel ===
In the 2000s a replica of the ship was built for the restored wharf at New Brunswick in Canada.
