= Occident (sternwheeler) =

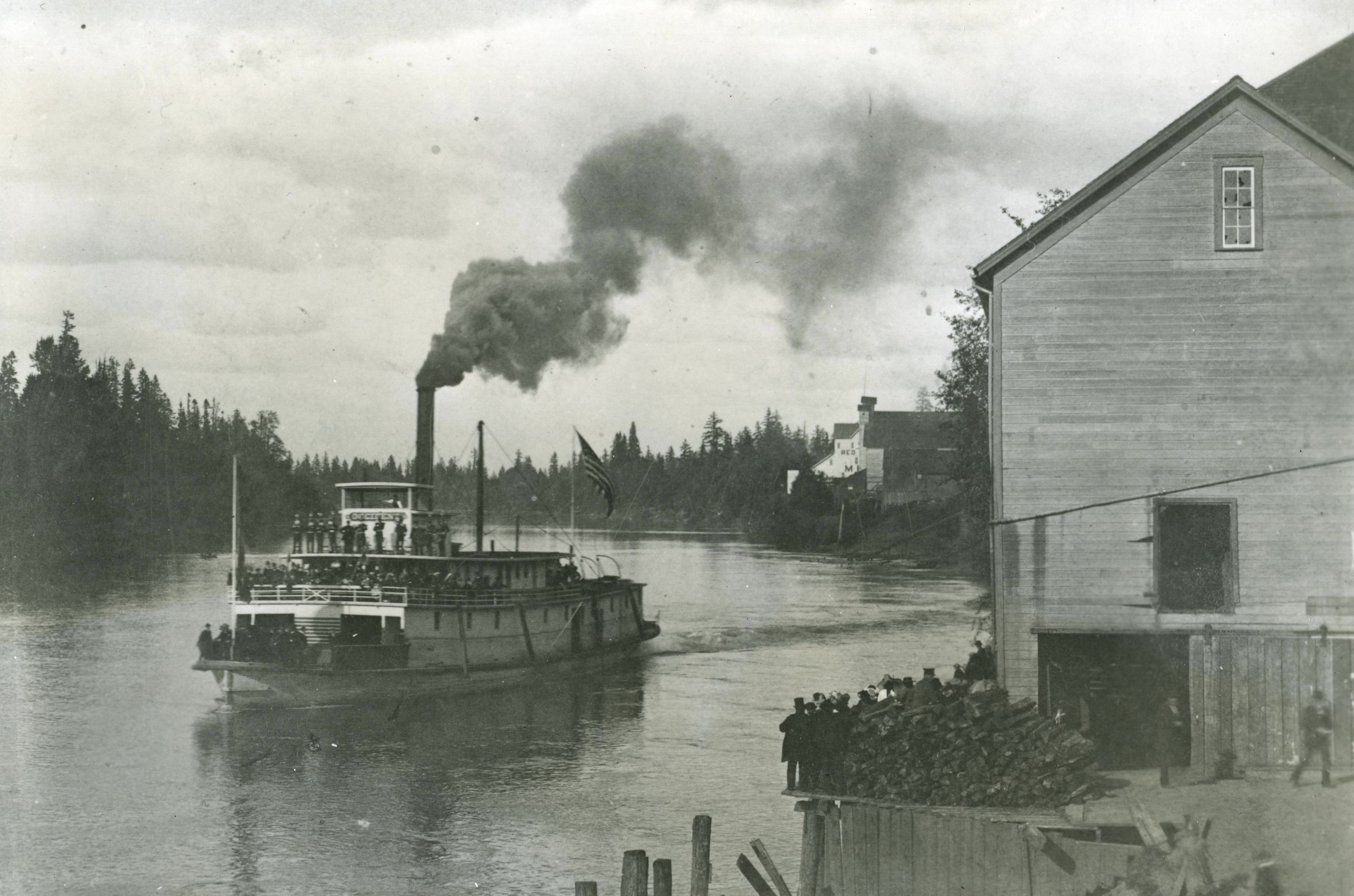
- Steamer Occident at Albany, Oregon, circa 1880, near Red Crown Mills (white building in right background). A brass band has assembled on the upper deck, indicating a special occasion.

History
- Name: Occident
- Owner: Willamette River Transportation Co.; Oregon Railway and Navigation Company
- Route: Willamette River
- Completed: 1875
- Identification: U.S. # 19448
- Fate: Dismantled 1881

General characteristics
- Class & type: riverine all-purpose
- Tonnage: 586.95 gross tons; 429.76 registered tons (1885).
- Length: 154.4 ft (47.1 m) over hull (exclusive of fantail)
- Beam: 35.8 ft (10.9 m) over hull (exclusive of guards
- Depth: 5 ft (1.5 m)
- Installed power: twin steam engines, horizontally mounted, each with bore of 16 in (406.4 mm) and stroke of 5 ft (1.52 m) or 5.5 ft (1.68 m)
- Propulsion: stern-wheel

Occident was a steamer that operated on the Willamette River and occasionally its tributary, the Santiam River from 1875 to about 1890. Occident was designed primarily for freight work, and did not have passenger accommodations. This Occident should not be confused with the smaller steam launch Occident, apparently propeller-driven, which operated out of Astoria, Oregon in the 1890s.

== Design and construction ==
Occident was considered a twin vessel to the sternwheeler Orient Occident was described as a freight steamer.

Occident was built at Portland, Oregon in 1875. In the fall of 1888, Occident had a draft of 22 inches.

Occident was given the official merchant vessel registry number 19448.

In 1885, Occident was 154.4 ft (47.1 m) exclusive of the extension of the main detail over the stern, called the “fantail” on which the stern-wheel was mounted. The beam (width) of the vessel was 35.8 ft (10.9 m) exclusive of the protective wooden timbers running along the top of the hull called the guards. The depth of hold was 5 ft (1.5 m).

The overall size of the vessel, in 1885, measured in tons, a unit of volume and not weight, was 586.95 gross tons and 429.76 net tons. In November 1879, Occident was described as having “tastefully furnished” staterooms and berths which were very wide.

== Engineering ==
Occident was driven by a stern-wheel, turned by twin steam engines, horizontally mounted, each with bore of 16 in (406.4 mm) and a piston stroke of 5 ft (1.52 m) or 5.5 ft (1.68 m) In 1879, Occident had two different stern-wheels which could be mounted on the steamer, one used for the seasonal low-water periods, and another for deeper water.

== Ownership ==
Occident was originally built for the Willamette River Transportation Company. However, Occident did not remain long under the original ownership.

In 1875, the Oregon Steam Navigation Company was planning to reenter the steamboat business on the Willamette River, which they had stayed away from since 1864, when an accommodation had been reached between O.S.N. and its then chief competitor on the Willamette, the People’s Transportation Company.

To effect this business plan, on December 29, 1875, O.S.N. set up a subsidiary corporation, the Willamette Transportation and Locks Company, with a capitalization of $1,000,000.

The officers of the new corporation were some of the most prominent businessmen in the state of Oregon: John C. Ainsworth, president; R.R. Thompson, vice-president; Theodore Wygant, Bernard “Barney” Goldsmith, and Frank T. Dodge, directors.

The Willamette River Transportation Company was dissolved, and all of its assets, including the steamer Occident, were transferred to the new corporation.

== Operations ==
=== Officers ===
Almost every prominent steamboat men on the Willamette served on Occident at one time or the other. In November 1879 the officers of Occident were: Miles Bell, captain; James Gist, pilot; W.N. Holmes, purser, Charles Jennings, engineer; George Goward, steward. At various times other officers included:

- Captain. Henry Carter, Nat H. Lane, Jr.; John Kelly, George Reynolds, Other captains of Occident included Sherman V. Short, J.D. Tackaberry (d.1900), and William R. Turnbull (1844-1877).
- Chief engineer: Charles E Gore, William Lewis, William J. Maher, and E. Vickers (1844-1893).
- Mate: George Benson, Alexander J. “A.J.” Spong.
- Purser: Frank W. Goodhue.
- First assistant engineer: Charles H. Jennings.

=== Work on the Santiam River ===
On the morning of Thursday, January 13, 1876, Occident arrived at Jefferson, Oregon, a small settlement in Marion County, Oregon on the Santiam River. Jefferson, at river mile 9.0 was considered the head of navigation on the Santiam.

No steamer had called at Jefferson since the Calliope, several years before. To reach Jefferson “was something of an accomplishment, since the Santiam, rapid and dashing, was practically unnavigable except during extreme high water and then only for a few days at a time.” The entire local population turned out to greet Occident. anvils were beaten as a welcome signal.

The steamer Champion also arrived at Jefferson at about the same time. Both vessels brought in merchandise to the city and took away, between them, several thousand bushells of wheat from the Granger warehouse.

=== Sinking of the Dayton ===
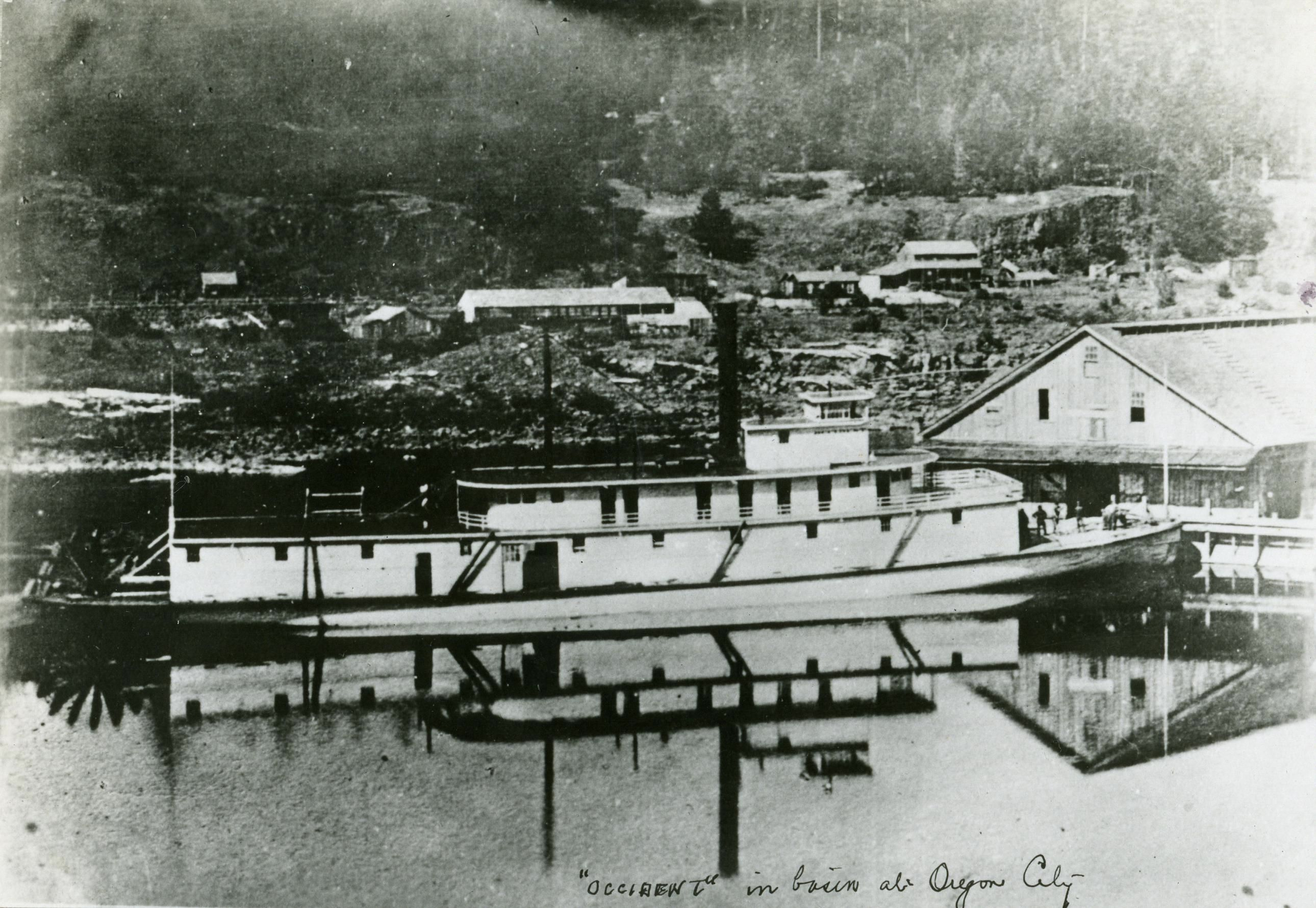
Occident at the boat basin in Oregon City, probably in the late 1870s.

On Saturday, May 13, 1876, the sternwheeler Dayton was moored at Oregon City, when Occident, then owned by the Willamette River Transportation and Locks Company came into the boat basin at full steam to unload a cargo of wheat for the Oregon City Mills. Dayton, at 203.4 gross tons, was much smaller than Occident.

While passing the boat yard, where Dayton was moored, Occident threw up a wake which pushed Dayton onto a snag, knocking a hole in the hull, and sinking Dayton almost immediately. The following Monday, May 15, three pumps were placed into Dayton, and worked from the sternwheeler Bonanza. After a full day of pumping, they were able to raise Dayton.

=== Low water service ===
On September 1, 1876, which was the start of the usual fall low water period on the Willamette, the steamer Bonanza was placed on a schedule of running three times a week between Salem and Corvallis, connecting with Occident at Salem.

=== Race with S.T. Church ===
At about 5:00 p.m. on October 31, 1878, Occident and another sternwheeler, S.T. Church arrived at Salem on their way upriver. Both of steamers had departed Portland simultaneously, and raced the whole way to Salem, with Church arriving about 3 minutes before Occident. Both boats then departed upriver to pick up freight, and about 7:00 a.m. on the next morning, November 1, they passed by Salem coming downriver.

=== Sale to Oregon Railway and Navigation Company ===
In 1879, the Oregon Steam Navigation Company, an extremely profitable company, dissolved and sold its entire fleet of steamers, including Occident, and all of its other assets, to a newly formed corporation, the Oregon Railway and Navigation Company, which was capitalized at $6,000,000. In this manner, the O.R.&N, as the new company was known, gained control of every significant steamer operating on the Columbia River system.

=== Rescue of a wood cutter ===
By November 11, 1876, Occident had switched over to its deep-water stern-wheel. On November 22, 1879, a newspaper, the Salem Daily Talk, reported that on the afternoon of the previous day, November 21, when Occident was coming downriver, just below Eola, Oregon, a man was seen clinging on to a snag in the river.

Captain Miles Bell was in command of Occident, and he ordered the steamer stopped, and a boat put out to rescue the man. It turned out the man, named Ross, had been cutting wood with another man, John Cline, and using a skiff, they were coming downriver to Salem, when the skiff overturned, throwing them into the water.

Ross grasped hold of the snag, but he had been in the water several hours was nearly exhausted by the time Occident came along. His partner Cline had been able to climb back onto the skiff and floated downstream, where he was rescued by a man on the Polk County, Oregon side of the Willamette, just upriver from Salem.

=== Fast running time ===
On Friday, January 31, 1880, Occident ran from Portland, Oregon to Corvallis in 14 hours and 30 minutes running time (probably exclusive of time transiting the Willamette Falls Locks), the fastest time yet between those two cities.

On Friday, June 4, 1880, at about 9:00 a.m., William R. Gillmore, a deckhand of the Occident, fell overboard and drowned. The incident occurred near the Boonville warehouse, about four miles upriver from Corvallis. Gilmore’s body could not be immediately recovered. The body was found floating in the river on June 26, 1880 about four miles south of Corvallis. Gilmore left a wife and two children in Salem.

On the Tuesday before February 3, 1882, Occident loaded 2,000 sacks of wheat at Corvallis.

As of May 29, 1885, Occident had been seized by the sheriff of Marion County, Oregon for $2,300 in unpaid taxes assessed against the “Narrow Gauge Road.” The steamer was tied up at Salem. Occident at the time was owned by the Oregon Railway and Navigation Company.

=== Record wheat harvest ===
In late October 1888, the fall rains were anticipated to soon raise the level of the Willamette River. There was then reported to have been “an enormous quantity of wheat stored along the river awaiting shipment.” This was said to be a greater amount of wheat, by at least 30%, than any other year in the history of the state.

Occident and three other steamers, Bonanza, Champion, and Orient were to transport the accumulated harvest.

All the steamers were reported to be “in excellent condition, having been thoroughly overhauled recently for the winter.” When the water has at its highest, all the steamers could easily proceed as far as Harrisburg, Oregon

The 1888 shipping season opened on October 29, when Occident came up to Salem from Portland in just 12 hours, including time waiting to transit the locks at Oregon City for two other boats to pass.

== Disposition ==
Occident was dismantled in Portland in 1891 or 1892. Another source reports that Occident was condemned by the government in 1889 and removed from service.
