= Hildur-class monitor =

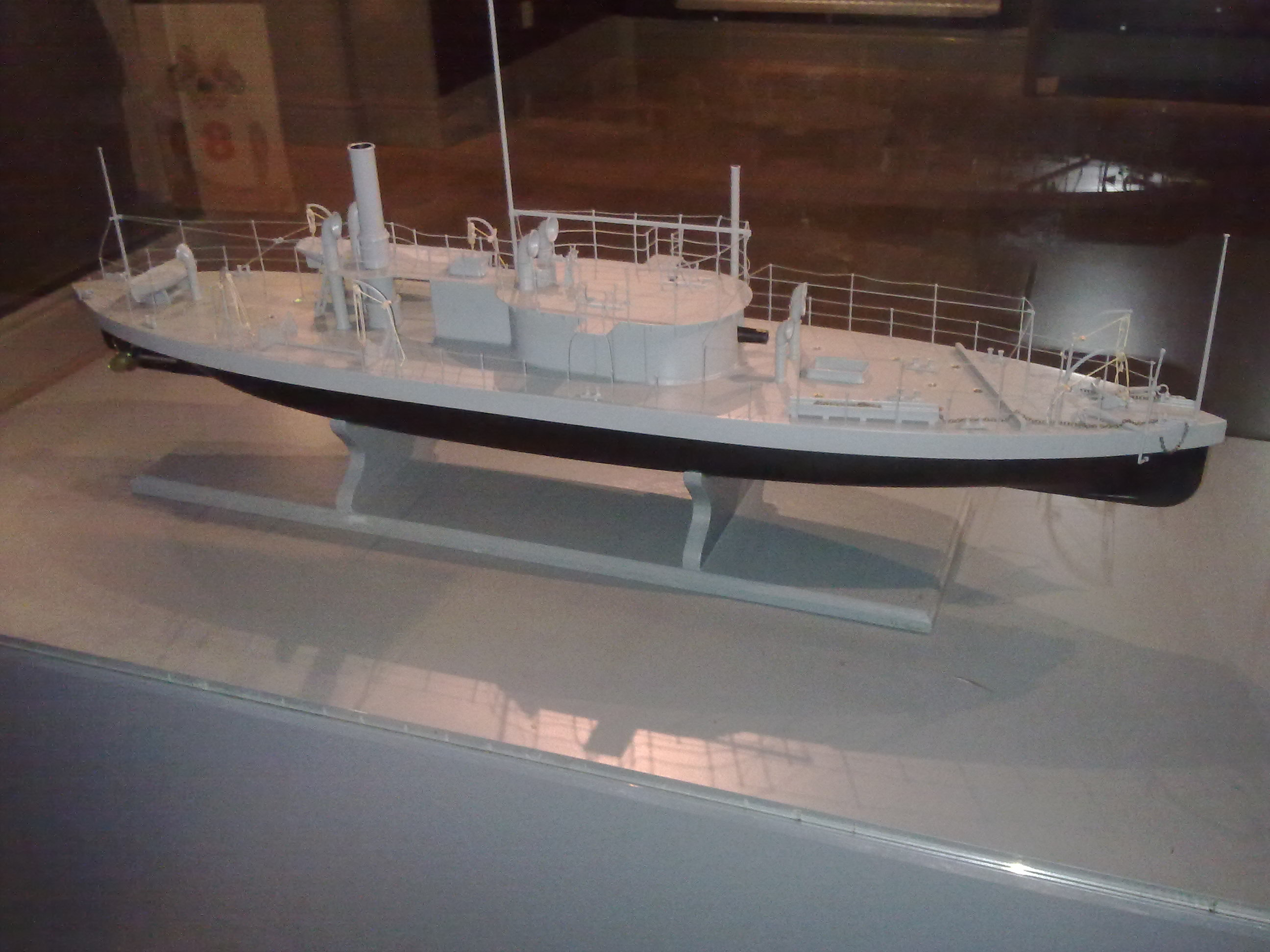
- Model of Hildur, the lead ship of the class

Class overview
- Operators: Swedish Navy
- Preceded by: John Ericsson class
- Succeeded by: None
- Built: 1870–1875?
- Completed: 7
- Scrapped: 6
- Preserved: 1

General characteristics (as built)
- Type: Monitor
- Displacement: 460 t (450 long tons) (deep load)
- Length: 39.78 m (130 ft 6 in)
- Beam: 8.72 m (28 ft 7 in)
- Draft: 2.7 m (8 ft 10 in)
- Installed power: 2 cylindrical boilers; 133 or 155 ihp (99 or 116 kW)
- Propulsion: 2 shafts, 2 horizontal-return connecting-rod steam engines
- Speed: 8 knots (15 km/h; 9.2 mph)
- Complement: 42 or 48
- Armament: 1 × 240 mm (9.4 in) gun
- Armor: Belt: 76 or 95 mm (3 or 4 in); Gun turret: 356–418 mm (14.0–16.5 in); Deck: 19 mm (0.7 in); Conning tower: 254 mm (10 in)

The Hildur-class monitors consisted of seven monitors built for the Swedish Navy in the 1870s. They were sold in 1919 and most were converted into fuel oil barges. One such ship, HSwMS Sölve, has been converted into a museum ship.

== Design and description ==
The Hildur-class monitors were designed by Lieutenant John Christian d'Ailly, from a proposal by John Ericsson, for the defense of Lake Mälaren and the Stockholm archipelago. The ships were 39.78 meters (130 ft 6 in) long overall and had a beam of 8.72 meters (28 ft 7 in). They had a draft of 2.7 meters (8 ft 10 in) and displaced 460 metric tons (450 long tons). The crew of the first two monitors, Hildur and Gerda, numbered 42 officers and men, the others had 48-man crews. Hildur and Gerda only had a stern rudder, the other had rudders at bow and stern. Bow rudders were fitted to the older ships when they were reconstructed.

The Hildurs had a pair of two-cylinder horizontal-return connecting-rod steam engines, each driving a single propeller using steam from two cylindrical boilers. The engines produced a total of 133 indicated horsepower (99 kW) in the first two ships and 155 ihp (116 kW) in the later ones which gave the monitors a maximum speed of 8 knots (15 km/h; 9.2 mph). The ships carried 23–25 metric tons (23–25 long tons) of coal.

The monitors were equipped with one 240-millimeter (9.4 in) M/69 rifled breech loader, mounted in a long, fixed, oval-shaped gun turret. The gun weighed 14,670 kilograms (32,340 lb) and fired projectiles at a muzzle velocity of 397 m/s (1,300 ft/s). At its maximum elevation of 7.5° it had a range of 3,500 meters (3,800 yd). The gun and its turret in Folke were oriented to the rear. Hildur and Gerda were rearmed with a 120-millimeter (4.7 in) quick-firing gun as well as three 57-millimeter (2.2 in) quick-firing guns 1890; the other were similarly rearmed later in the 1890s or the early 1900s.

Most of the ships of the Hildur class had a complete waterline armor belt of wrought iron that was 76 millimeters (3 in) thick with a 19-millimeter (0.7 in) deck. Bjorn and Ulf had a 95 mm (3.7 in) belt while Folke's belt ranged from 48 mm (1.9 in) forward to 76 mm aft. The face of the gun turret was protected by 418 millimeters (16.5 in) of armor, while its sides were 356 millimeters (14 in) thick. The conning tower protruded from the top of the turret and was protected by 254 millimeters (10 in) of armor.

== Construction ==
Ship	Builder	Laid down	Launched	Reconstructed	Fate
HSwMS Hildur	Bergsund and Lindbergs	late 1870	1872	1890 and 1907	Sold and converted into an oil barge, 1919
HSwMS Gerda	Bergsund and Lindbergs	late 1870	1872	1890 and 1907	Converted into a torpedo-monitoring station, 1919
HSwMS Ulf	Motala Verkstad, Norrköping	Unknown	1873	1890s–early 1900s	Sold and converted into oil barges, 1919
HSwMS Berserk	Motala Verkstad, Norrköping	Unknown	1874	1890s–early 1900s	Sold and converted into oil barges, 1919
HSwMS Björn	Motala Verkstad, Norrköping	Unknown	1874	1890s–early 1900s	Sold and converted into oil barges, 1919
HSwMS Sölve	Motala Verkstad, Norrköping	Unknown	1875	1890s–early 1900s	Sold and converted into oil barges, 1919
HSwMS Folke	Motala Verkstad, Norrköping	Unknown	1875	1890s–early 1900s	Discarded, 1919; converted into a heating plant for submarines before being sold in 1942

== Service ==
During Hildur's gunnery trials in 1872, her shells penetrated the walls of Vaxholm Fortress in three shots.

== See also ==
- List of ironclads

== Bibliography ==
- Bojerud, Stellan (1986). "Monitors and Armored Gunboats of the Royal Swedish Navy, Part 1". Warship International. XXIII (2): 167–180. ISSN 0043-0374.
- Campbell, N. J. M. (1979). "Sweden". In Chesneau, Roger & Kolesnik, Eugene M. (eds.). Conway's All the World's Fighting Ships 1860–1905. Greenwich: Conway Maritime Press. pp. 360–363. ISBN 0-8317-0302-4.
- Harris, Daniel G. (1994). "The Swedish Monitors". In Roberts, John (ed.). Warship 1994. Annapolis, Maryland: Naval Institute Press. pp. 22–34. ISBN 1-55750-903-4.
