= Our Son (schooner) =

Schooner wrecked in Lake Michigan

History

United States
- Name: Our Son
- Operator: Captain Fred Nelson
- Port of registry: US
- Launched: 1875
- Fate: Lost with all hands rescued, 26 September 1930

General characteristics
- Type: Schooner
- Crew: 7

Our Son was a commercial schooner, launched in 1875, that carried freight on the Upper Great Lakes. By 1930, she was one of the last sail-powered vessels in Great Lakes revenue freight service. In September 1930, while carrying pulpwood to the Central Paper Company mill in Muskegon, Michigan, she was made helpless by storm winds. Without working sails and filling up with water, the schooner drifted about in central Lake Michigan until sighted by the lake carrier William Nelson.

In a dramatic rescue operation in the open seas, and barely owning steerageway itself in the storm conditions, the William Nelson maneuvered adjacent to the sinking schooner's beam and rescued Captain Nelson and six crew members.

== See also ==
- List of shipwrecks in the Great Lakes
