= A. S. Davis =

American merchant ship (1875–1878)

- The wrecking of A. S. Davis off Cape Henry, Virginia, drawn to William Minton's account

History

United States
- Name: A. S. Davis
- Builder: Columbus Carter, Belfast, Maine
- Launched: June 1875
- Home port: Searsport, Maine
- Fate: Wrecked during the Gale of 1878

General characteristics
- Displacement: 1400 tons
- Length: 204.5 feet (62.3 m)
- Beam: 39 feet (12 m)
- Draft: 24 feet (7.3 m)

A. S. Davis was an American Down Easter launched in 1875. While on her second voyage, the Gale of 1878 caused her to run aground off Virginia on 23 October, killing all but one members of her crew.

== History ==
A. S. Davis, of Searsport, Maine, was built by Columbus Carter at Belfast, Maine, and launched in June 1875. She was 204.5 feet (62.3 m) long by 39 feet (12 m) wide, by 24 feet (7.3 m) deep and registered 1400 tons. She was named after Dr. A. S. Davis, who had a summer home near Searsport, Maine, and who owned an interest in the ship. Her master, Captain James W. Ford, was the largest individual owner and was also the ship’s manager.

The maiden voyage of the Davis was from St. John, New Brunswick, to Liverpool, and thence to Bombay and Le Havre. The second voyage was from New Orleans to Liverpool, Cardiff, Hong Kong, San Francisco, Callao, and Hampton Roads, but the last section was never completed. Her passage from Cardiff to Hong Kong was made in the good time of 104 days and the run of 44 days from China to San Francisco was also fast.

The Davis sailed from Callao, guano laden, on 23 July 1878, and on 22 October, when 91 days out and about three hours’ sail from Hampton Roads, she ran into a gale of wind and had to shorten down and heave to. Shortly after midnight a cast of the lead showed 814 fathoms (4,884 ft; 1,489 m) of water and at 2 am the ship struck the beach heavily, head on. The sea burst in the stern and filled the holds. The seas commenced making a clean breach fore and aft and all hands climbed into the main and mizzen rigging. After a few moments of confusion and uproar, the masts fell, the ship was a complete wreck and all the crew were in the water in the intense darkness. Seaman William H. Minton was washed ashore unconscious, but was revived. He was the only survivor. Of the 19 men lost, the bodies of 17 were recovered when the storm ceased. All were badly mangled. The survivor when found, was badly bruised and bleeding and stripped of all clothing.

According to the official report, the storm in which the Davis was lost was one of exceptional violence. At the time the ship struck the wind was blowing 84 miles per hour (135 km/h) an hour. The surf was terrible, tearing away the beach hills and nearly destroying several lifesaving stations. It was impossible for any one to either see or breathe for the flying sand and had an army of men been gathered, no help could have been rendered the stranded vessel or her crew.
