= PS Princess Beatrice =

19th-century paddle steamer ferry

History
- Name: Princess Beatrice (1875–1889); Munster (1889–1904)
- Namesake: Princess Beatrice; Munster
- Owner: Larne and Stranraer Ferry Company (1875–1889); British and Irish Steam Packet Company (1889–1904)
- Builder: Harland and Wolff, Belfast
- Yard number: 47194
- Launched: 4 November 1875
- Completed: 4 February 1876
- Out of service: 1903
- Fate: Scrapped 1904

General characteristics
- Type: Paddle steamer
- Tonnage: 556 GRT
- Length: 235 ft (72 m)
- Beam: 25 ft (7.6 m)
- Depth: 12 ft (3.7 m)
- Propulsion: 200 nhp DA (2 Cy)
- Speed: 14 knots (26 km/h; 16 mph)

PS Princess Beatrice (also known as the PS Munster) was a paddle steamer built by Harland & Wolff on 4 November 1875 for the Larne and Stranraer Ferry Company. She was named after Princess Beatrice, the youngest daughter of Queen Victoria and Prince Albert.

== History ==
The Princess Beatrice was constructed in 1874 by Harland & Wolff at Belfast, Northern Ireland. She was launched on 4 November 1875 and was completed on 4 February 1876. She was operated by the Larne and Stranraer Ferry Company as a ferry between Larne, Northern Ireland and Stranraer, Scotland.

She had a length of 200 feet (61 m), a beam of 25 feet (7.6 m), and a depth of 12 feet (3.7 m). She could carry a total of 500 passengers and could transport a total 50 metric tons (55 short tons) of cargo. She was powered by two compound steam engines that drove two paddle wheels, she also had a top speed of 14 knots (26 km/h; 16 mph).

She served on the Larne–Stranraer route until 1889, when she was sold to the British and Irish Steam Packet Company. She was renamed PS Munster and transferred to the Dublin–Holyhead service. She was later used on various routes around Ireland and the UK, including Cork, Belfast, Liverpool, and Glasgow. The vessel was retired in 1903 and was scrapped in Dumbarton in 1904.
