= Fredrik Bojerud =

Swedish politician (born 1970)

Fredrik Bojerud (born November 24, 1970, in Sundbyberg) is a Swedish politician. He is a member of the Centre Party. He is the son of Stellan Bojerud, a member of the Riksdag for the Sweden Democrats 2010-2011 and 2012-2014 and Anna Corshammar-Bojerud, former member of the Riksdag for the Centre Party.

Fredrik Bojerud got his Officers Commission in the Guards Cavalry. He is CO of 241st Readiness Company of the Home Guard/Territorial Army. In 2007-2008 he served as Press and Information Officer (Captain) with the Swedish UN peacekeepers in Afghanistan.
