= Orient (sternwheeler) =

Boat

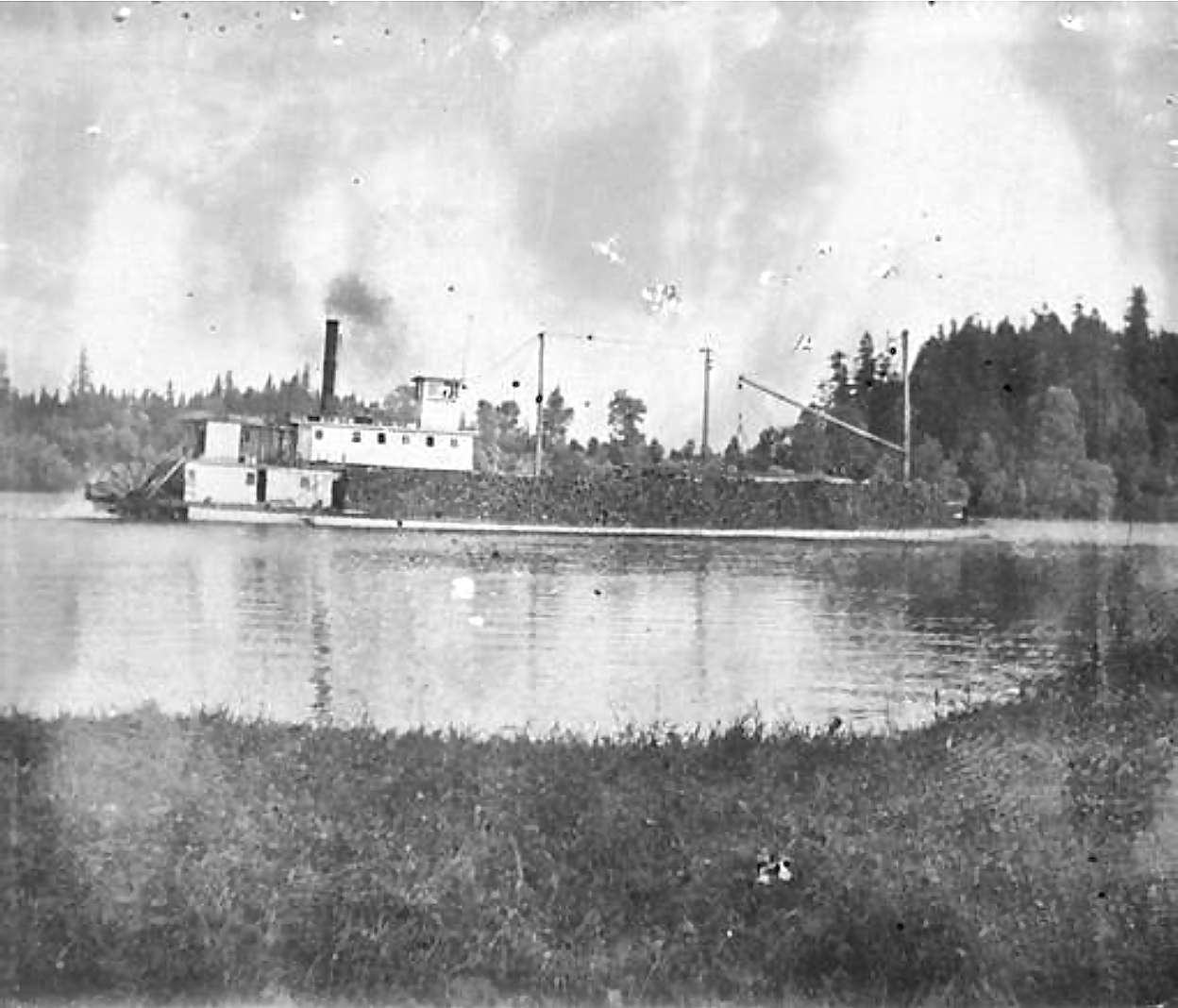
- Orient pushing a barge loaded with cordwood on the Lewis River, 1894 or earlier.

History
- Name: Orient
- Owner: Willamette Trans. & Locks Co.; Oregon Steam Nav. Co.; Oregon Railway & Nav. Co.; Thomas Callahan
- Route: Willamette, Yamhill, Lewis and Cowlitz rivers
- Maiden voyage: August 10, 1875
- Out of service: 1894
- Identification: U.S. 19449
- Fate: Burned on September 2, 1894 at Caitlin, WA on the Cowlitz River while awaiting repairs.

General characteristics
- Type: riverine all-purpose
- Tonnage: 586.95 gross tons (1878)
- Length: 154 ft (46.94 m) (exclusive of fantail)
- Beam: 22 ft (6.71 m) (exclusive of guard)
- Depth: 5.0 ft (1.52 m) depth of hold
- Installed power: twin horizontally-mounted single-cylinder steam engines, each with bore of 16 in (406 mm) and stroke of 6 ft (1.83 m)
- Propulsion: stern-wheel

Orient was a light-draft sternwheel-driven steamboat built in 1875 for the Willamette River Transportation Company, a concern owned by pioneer businessman Ben Holladay. Shortly after its completion, it was acquired by the Oregon Steam Navigation Company. Orient was a near-twin vessel of a steamer built at the same time, the Occident.

Orient served until 1892 on the Willamette and Yamhill rivers, after which it was sold for a small amount to a new owner who thought the steamer could be put to some use. Orient was operated until 1894, and had tendency to sink during its last years in service.

In April 1893, Orient sank after a collision with a bridge in Portland, Oregon in 1893, sank again on the Cowlitz River in March 1894, and then in September 1894 was completely destroyed by fire while efforts were being made to return Orient to service.

== Construction ==
Orient was designed to have a shallow draft so that it could operate during low water seasons on the upper Willamette River. Orient was built at the same time as the similar Occident.

Both vessels were built in 1875. John J. Holland, chief builder for O.S.N., supervised construction of Orient. Orient and Occident were known as the “Willamette Twins.”

They were considered first class western steamboats at the time they were built.

== Dimensions ==
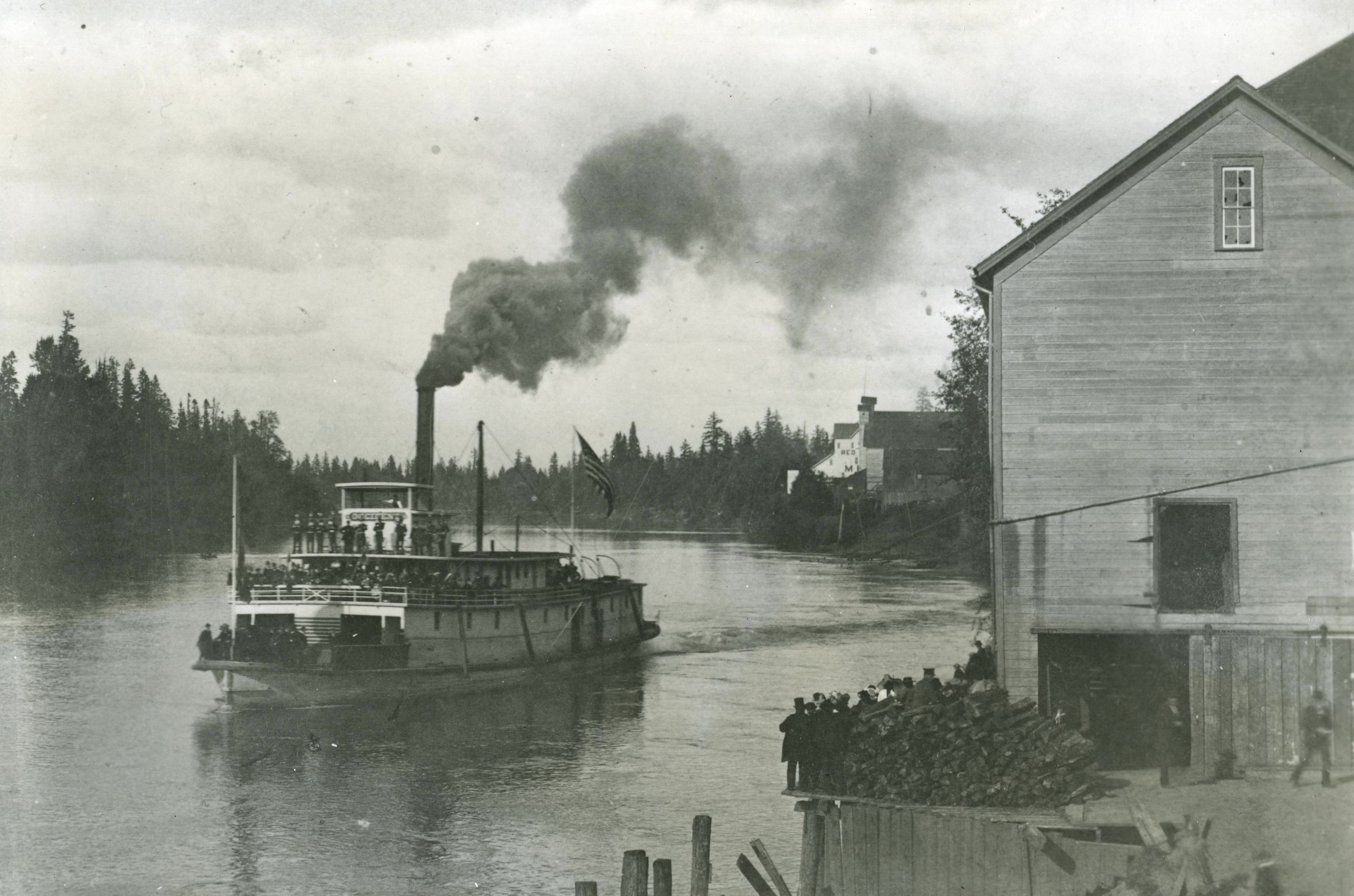
Steamer Occident, near twin of Orient, at Albany, Oregon circa 1880. Note the wide beam on the vessel and the stacked cordwood fuel on the dock.

Orient and Occident were both 154 ft (46.94 m) long measured over the hull, exclusive of the extension of the main deck over the stern, called the “fantail” on which the stern-wheel was mounted. Both vessels had a beam of 22 ft (6.71 m) exclusive of the long protective timbers along the upper portion of the hull called the guards, and a depth of hold of 5.0 ft (1.52 m).

Orient could carry about 600 tons of freight. According to a newspaper report from the time they were built, “their great length and breadth of beam will enable them to toat gobs of freight.”

Orient's gross tonnage (a measure of size and not weight) was 586.95 in 1878. The registered tonnage was 429.76 in 1889. The official merchant vessel registry number was 19449.

== Machinery ==
Orient was driven by a stern-wheel which was turned by two horizontally mounted single-cylinder steam engines, each with a bore of 16 in (406 mm) and stroke of 7 ft (2.13 m). The engines had come from the upper Columbia river steamer Spray, which had been built in 1862. The boilers were wood-fired, and it was necessary for the steamer to stop at wood depots along its route to “wood up”.

Wooding up could be dangerous, as the wood was split into large baulks and generally had to be carried up a narrow gangplank on to the steamer. Loss of life could occur if a crew man fell into the river while wooding up. In an accident in early October 1878, most of the crew of Orient were thrown into the water while wooding up when a wharf depot gave way. No one was drowned, but one crewman sustained injuries from being struck by a large piece of wood.

== Early career ==
Orient made its trial trip on August 10, 1875. In November 1875 Orient, under Captain Lucien E. Pratt, took the place of E.N. Cooke on the run between Portland and Oregon City. E.N. Cooke was then owned by the Oregon Steamship Company, in which pioneer businessman Ben Holladay held the controlling interest.

Cooke was to take Ben Holladay on a pleasure excursion to the Skipanon River in Clatsop County, after which the Cooke would be taken out of service for repairs. With no other boat to replace the Cooke, the Holladay concern requested that O.S.N. place the new steamer Orient on the route temporarily.

== New ownership ==
At the end of December 1875, Oregon Steam Navigation Co. set up a new corporate subsidiary, the Willamette River Transportation & Locks Company, and transferred substantial assets, including the Orient, to the new corporation.

Willamette Transportation & Locks Co. was incorporated in late December 1875 with a capital stock of $1,000,000 in shares of $100. The new company was organized to do business on the Willamette River and its tributaries and the lower Columbia River. The directors were all prominent business and steamboatmen: Capt. John C. Ainsworth, Robert R.Thompson, Capt. Theodore Wygant, Bernard “Barnie” Goldsmith and Capt. Frank T. Dodge.

Willamette Transportation & Locks Co.owned the Willamette Falls Locks, then recently completed, the farmer's warehouse at Astoria, Oregon, part of the Astoria waterfront, a number of barges, as well as the steamboats Willamette Chief, Gov. Grover, Champion, Beaver, Annie Stewart and Orient. According to the Albany Register, a critic of the new company:

By this consolidation competition on the Willamette and lower Columbia rivers is practically played out, notwithstanding the promises made by certain parties. The Canal & Locks Co. has thus consolidated with the O.S.N. Co., the oldest and most grinding monopoly in the state. Next.

Orient ran for Willamette Transportation & Locks Co. until 1879, when it came back into the direct control of Oregon Steam Navigation Co.

In September 1877, during low water, Orient was operating on the Yamhill River to Dayton, Oregon. A report of the time stated:

The Yamhill River, never offering ample breadth or depth of water for the purposes of commerce, is at this season extremely low, the banks on either side almost touching the boat, as, puffing, backing, steaming along the tortuous channel, she makes her slow way to Dayton, and, after tarrying a short time to discharge freight and passengers, steams a mile or two further up the river in order to find a place where she can turn round before taking on the wheat that awaits her.”

== Officers ==
Pioneer steamboat captain George Jerome was in charge of Orient for ten years, and when he died in November 1886, his place was taken by captains Sherman V. Short and John C. Gore. Jerome was a highly regarded man. Following his funeral at the First Congregational Church in Portland, his remains were carried on Orient (then under the ownership of the Oregon Railway and Navigation Company up the Willamette River to River View Cemetery.

== Transfer to Oregon Railway and Navigation Co. ==
In June 1879, the Oregon Steam Navigation Company, one of the most successful companies in the history of Oregon, voluntarily dissolved and sold all of its assets including Orient and a number of other steamboats, to the newly formed Oregon Railway and Navigation Company.

== Exploding cigar incident ==
On the Tuesday before May 13, 1880, someone gave Purser K. Phillips, of Orient, an exploding cigar and then asked the purser some questions about the boat. Some time later the purser lit the cigar, and in a few minutes it exploded as he held it in his left hand. The initial report was that the purser's hand was mangled and his left eye was put out. Had he been smoking the cigar he would have been killed.

The incident initially appeared to have been related to a criminal case in which the purser was an important witness. A later report stated that the purser's injuries were not as severe as initially reported, and that the incident was an example of a dangerous trick which had recently gained popularity of loading cigars with gunpowder.

== Later operations ==
In 1885 Orient was running on the Yamhill River and the upper Willamette, in competition with two other sternwheelers, the A.A. McCully, running under Captain Zebulon J. Hatch (1846–1913), and the Salem, owned by Captain Ernest W. Spencer (1852–1930).

In January 1890, Orient was forced to suspend operations on the Willamette River, being laid up in winter quarters at Evans, Oregon, about ten miles up river from Oregon City, near New Era, Oregon. All traffic on the Willamette was then idle. Ice had blocked the gorge just upriver from Oregon City for a few days.

By the Sunday morning before January 13, 1990, the ice had washed over Willamette Falls and the river was clear again. Orient was able to raise steam and reached the Ash Street dock in Portland a few hours later at 12:30 p.m. The sudden clearing of the ice was attributed to a heavy rainfall on the Saturday night before.

== Sale in 1892 ==
In 1892, Orient, worn out from work on the Willamette, was sold to Captain Thomas Callahan (b.1836) for $1,500. Callahan rebuilt Orient. Callahan put the steamer in general freight and jobbing work.

== Collision with Morrison Street Bridge ==
On April 12, 1893, Orient struck the draw of the Morrison Bridge in Portland, tore a hole in its hull, and sank.

The accident occurred at about 1:15 p.m. on April 12, when Orient, with Captain Callahan at the wheel, was bound downstream at full speed headed towards both the Madison Street and Morrison Street bridges. (The Madison Bridge has since replaced by the Hawthorne Bridge).

The steamer whistled to signal the bridge tenders to open the draws at the Madison Street Bridge and the downstream Morrison Bridge. Orient, carrying no passengers, was bound for the Lewis River to pick up a load of lumber for a barrel factory in Portland.

The Madison Street bridge tender opened the draw in time, but the pilot on Orient miscalculated the steamer's course, and the side of the boat hit the draw pier. This knocked the steamer off course, so when it came to the Morrison Bridge, it was not headed straight through the draw. As a result, the steamer hit the stone abutment on the east side of the draw span of the Morrison Bridge. This knocked a hole in the right side of the steamer about 25 feet back from the bow.

The force of the river's current swung the Orient’s bow across the river channel where it became jammed into the draw pier. The steamer stayed in this position for some time, but eventually drifted loose and floated downstream.

Hundreds of people watched, crowding onto docks and piers, as the Orient, with steam was still up in the boiler, but in a sinking condition, was able to across to the wharves along the west side of the river and tie it up. However the forward part of the boat became entangled with the cable for the Stark Street Ferry as the steamer sank to the bottom of the river. With difficulty Orient was raised.

== Final sinking and loss by fire ==
A few months later, in 1894, Orient sank again, this time in the Cowlitz River. According to one source, Orient had struck a rock at high water. As the water receded, Orient was left out on the river bank. According to another, more contemporaneous source, Orient struck a snag on the Cowlitz River on March 22, 1894, and sank. With no cargo on board the damage was reported to be $1,000.

Crews were sent to move the old steamer, but before the vessel could be hauled off the river bank, it was destroyed by fire. This is reported to have occurred at Caitlin, Washington, on September 8, 1894. Damage was reported to be $10,000.
