= HSwMS Folke =

Swedish Navy warship

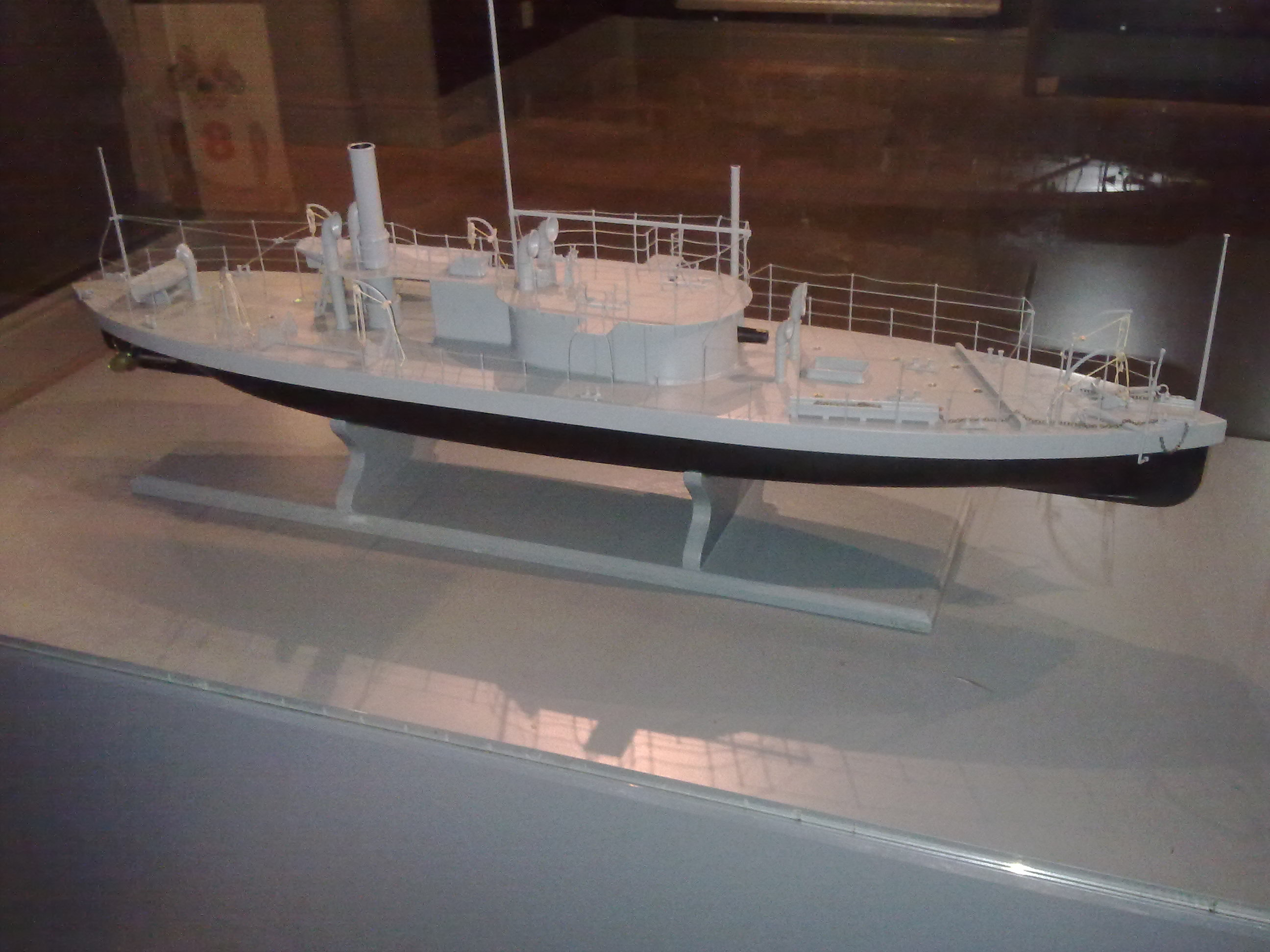
- Model of Hildur, the lead ship of the class

History

Sweden
- Name: HSwMS Folke
- Builder: Motala Verkstad, Norrköping
- Launched: 1875
- Completed: 1875?
- Decommissioned: 1919
- Fate: Sold, 1942

General characteristics
- Type: Hildur-class monitor
- Displacement: 460 t (450 long tons) (deep load)
- Length: 39.78 m (130 ft 6 in)
- Beam: 8.72 m (28 ft 7 in)
- Draft: 2.7 m (8 ft 10 in)
- Installed power: 2 cylindrical boilers; 155 ihp (116 kW)
- Propulsion: 2 shafts, 2 horizontal-return connecting-rod steam engines
- Speed: 8 knots (15 km/h; 9.2 mph)
- Complement: 48
- Armament: 1 × 240 mm (9.4 in) gun; 2 × 76 mm (3 in) guns
- Armor: Belt: 48–76 mm (1.9–3.0 in); Gun turret: 356–418 mm (14.0–16.5 in); Deck: 19 mm (0.7 in); Conning tower: 254 mm (10 in)

HSwMS Folke was the last of the seven Hildur-class monitors built for the Swedish Navy in the mid-1870s. Unlike her sisters, her gun turret was fixed to the rear. The ship was placed in reserve in 1919 and ultimately sold in 1942.

== Design and description ==
The Hildur-class monitors were designed by Lieutenant John Christian d'Ailly, from a proposal by John Ericsson, for the defense of Lake Mälaren and the Stockholm archipelago. They had fixed turrets mounting 240 mm (9.4 in) guns and someone on the defense staff realized that they could be destroyed while retreating because none of the ships could fire to their rear. Folke was designed to protect her sisters in that situation as her turret was fixed to the rear.

Folke was 39.78 meters (130 ft 6 in) long overall and had a beam of 8.72 meters (28 ft 7 in). She had a draft of 2.7 meters (8 ft 10 in) and displaced 460 metric tons (450 long tons). Her crew numbered 48 officers and men. The ship had a rudder at bow and stern.

The Hildur-class ships had two horizontal twin-cylinder steam engines, each driving a single propeller. Their engines were powered by two cylindrical boilers. The engines produced a total of 155 indicated horsepower (116 kW) which gave the monitors a maximum speed of 8 knots (15 km/h; 9.2 mph). The ships carried 23–25 metric tons (23–25 long tons) of coal.

=== Armament ===
Folke was equipped with one 240-millimeter (9.4 in) M/69 rifled breech loader, mounted in a long, fixed, oval-shaped turret that faced to the rear. The gun weighed 14,670 kilograms (32,340 lb) and fired projectiles at a muzzle velocity of 397 m/s (1,300 ft/s). At its maximum elevation of 7.5° it had a range of 3,500 meters (3,800 yd). The ship also mounted two 75-millimeter (3 in) guns.

Folke was rearmed with a 120-millimeter (4.7 in) quick-firing gun as well as three 57-millimeter (2.2 in) quick-firing guns sometime in the 1890s or the early 1900s.

=== Armor ===
Folke had a complete waterline armor belt of wrought iron that ranged 38 to 76 millimeters (1.5 to 3.0 in) thick from front to rear. The deck was 19 millimeters (0.7 in) thick. The face of the gun turret was protected by 418 millimeters (16.5 in) of armor, while its sides were 356 millimeters (14 in) thick. The conning tower protruded from the top of the turret and was protected by 254 millimeters (10 in) of armor.

== Construction and service ==
Folke was launched in 1875 by Motala Verkstad at Norrköping. She was decommissioned in 1919 and was eventually converted into a heating plant for mothballed submarines. The ship was sold in 1942 for conversion to a barge.
