= Daniel Gibson Harris =

British and Canadian naval officer, and naval historian (1915–2007)

Daniel Gibson Harris (1915–2007) was an accountant, a British naval attaché during World War II and a writer on Swedish naval history.

The son (with three sisters and one brother) of James Gibson Harris (1874-1952) and Elisabeth "Bessie" Miles (1882-1960), he was born in Great Missenden, Buckinghamshire, England, and, after attending Sherborne School, trained as a chartered accountant. He joined the Royal Naval Supplementary Volunteer Reserve but, having learned Swedish, was sent in 1940 to the British embassy in Stockholm as Assistant Naval Attache, and remained there for the rest of the war. During Operation Rheinübung, together with his superior, Captain Henry Denham, he obtained details of the current position of the Bismarck - this information then led to its chase and eventual sinking by the British Navy. In 1943, he met and married Marianne Syk in Sweden. Their marriage continued until his death. Towards the end of his life, he wrote and published a memoir, Observed Secretly: Northern Window about his experiences during the War.

After the war, Harris remained in Stockholm for a while as an employee of the English Steel Corporation, and then moved first to New York City and then to Alberta, Canada. In 1950, he transferred to the Royal Canadian Naval Reserve, then in 1960, he joined the National Energy Board and in 1963, moved to Ottawa where he helped found the Canadian Nordic Society and became its first president from 1963 to 1967.

After he retired in the early 1980s, Harris took a BA in history at Carleton University and started seriously pursuing his interest in Swedish naval history. In 1989, he published his first book F H Chapman: The First Naval Architect and his work. He also published a number of papers and articles on Swedish naval history, continuing to do so until his final years.

Harris died on 19 November 2007 at Bells Corners, Ottawa, Ontario, Canada.

== Awards ==
- Prince Bertil, Duke of Halland, on behalf of the King of Sweden, created him Knight First Class of the Order of the North Star in recognition of his services in promoting Sweden in Canada.
- In November 1989, the Royal Swedish Society of Naval Sciences elected him a Corresponding Member, then in 2002, awarded him its Silver Medal.
- Harris received the Canadian Forces' Decoration and was authorized to use the post-nominal CD for his long service in the Naval reserve.

== Published Works ==
Books

- Harris, Daniel (1989). F. H. Chapman: The First Naval Architect and his Work. Conway Maritime Press. ISBN 0-87021-052-1.
- Chaplin, Philip; Daniel G Harris (2006). Observed Secretly - Northern Window. Ottawa: Helmsman Publications. p. 195. ISBN 0-9737444-0-5.

Articles

- Daniel G. Harris. "ADMIRAL FREDERIC AF CHAPMAN'S AUXILIARY VESSELS FOR THE SWEDISH INSHORE FLEET," The Mariner's Mirror, vol. 75, no 3 (1989), pp. 211-229.
- Daniel G. Harris, "CANADIAN WARSHIP CONSTRUCTION 1917–19: THE GREAT LAKES AND UPPER ST LAWRENCE RIVER AREAS," The Mariner's Mirror, vol. 75, no, 2 (1989), pp. 149-158.
- Daniel G. Harris, "The Svierge Class Coastal Defense Ships". In Gardiner, Robert (ed.). Warship 1992. London: Naval Institute Press. pp. 80–98. ISBN 0-85177-603-5.
- Harris, Daniel G. (1994). "The Swedish Monitors". In Roberts, John (ed.). Warship 1994. Annapolis, Maryland: Naval Institute Press. pp. 22–34. ISBN 1-55750-903-4.
- Daniel G. Harris, "The Swedish Armoured Coastal Defence Ships". Warship vol. XX (1996). pp. 9–24.
- Daniel G.Harris, CD, BA "CHARLES SHELDON AND THE BALTIC'S FIRST DRY DOCK," The Mariner's Mirror, vol. 85, no. 4 (1999), pp. 396-404.
- Daniel Harris, "Swedish Steam Torpedo Boats". In Preston, Antony (ed.). Warship 2000–2001. Conway Maritime Press. pp. 97–124. ISBN 0-85177-791-0.

== Archival Sources ==
- National Defence Headquarters Directorate of History and Heritage, Ottawa. Fonds 92/155 - Daniel G. Harris fonds.
