= HSwMS Garmer =

1868 Swedish river monitor

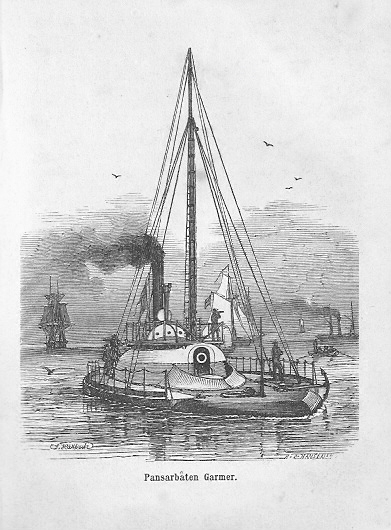

History

Sweden
- Name: Garmer
- Namesake: Garmr
- Builder: Motala Verkstad, Norrköping
- Launched: 1867
- Completed: 1868
- Fate: Sold for scrap, 1893

General characteristics
- Type: River monitor
- Displacement: 271 t (267 long tons) (deep load)
- Length: 28.5 m (93 ft 6 in)
- Beam: 6.98 m (22 ft 11 in)
- Draft: 2.29 m (7 ft 6 in)
- Installed power: 1 boiler; 90 ihp (67 kW)
- Propulsion: 1 shaft, 1 Vibrating-lever steam engine
- Speed: 5.5 knots (10.2 km/h; 6.3 mph)
- Complement: 20
- Armament: 1 × 267 mm (10.5 in) smoothbore gun
- Armor: Belt: 39 mm (1.5 in); Gun turret: 149 mm (5.9 in); Deck: 20 mm (0.8 in); Conning tower: 208 mm (8.2 in)

HSwMS Garmer was a small river monitor built for the Swedish Royal Skerry Artillery in the mid-1860s. She was designed to operate on the Swedish canals and lakes as well as in the shallow waters of the coast. The ship's captain had to steer the ship as well as aim and fire her gun. Garmer was sold for scrap in 1893.

== Design and description ==
In 1865 the Navy Minister, Baltzar von Platen, persuaded the Riksdag of the Estates to establish the Royal Skerry Artillery as part of the Swedish Army to defend the inner Swedish waters and protect the flanks of Swedish fortresses. This force was to be equipped with ten small monitors to operate in shallow waters that could navigate the Göta Canal system that linked Gothenburg (Swedish: Göteborg) on the west coast to Söderköping on the Baltic Sea.

HSwMS Garmer, named after the dog Garmr from Norse mythology, was the first of these monitors. She was designed by the inventor John Ericsson and Lieutenant John Christian d'Ailly. Garmer was intended to support Karlsborg Fortress on Lake Vättern. A report to the Parliament of Sweden described her as lacking a keel, flat-bottomed amidships and had a sharp bow and stern. The ship measured 28.5 meters (93 ft 6 in) long overall and had a beam of 6.98 meters (22 ft 11 in). She had a draft of 2.29 meters (7 ft 6 in) and displaced 271 metric tons (267 long tons). Her crew numbered 20 officers and men.

Garmer had a single 90-indicated-horsepower (67 kW) steam engine imported from New York that was powered by a single fire-tube boiler. The monitor had a maximum speed of 5.5 knots (10.2 km/h; 6.3 mph), half a knot less than her designed speed of 6 knots (11 km/h; 6.9 mph). She was armed with a single muzzle-loading 267-millimeter (10.5 in) M/66 smoothbore gun mounted in a long, fixed, oval-shaped turret. In 1877 Garmer received a 10-barreled 12.17-millimeter (0.479 in) M/75 machine gun designed by Helge Palmcrantz. The machine gun weighed 115 kilograms (254 lb) and had a rate of fire of 500 rounds per minute. Its projectiles had a muzzle velocity of 386 m/s (1,270 ft/s) and a maximum range of 900 meters (980 yd).

Garmer had a complete waterline armor belt of wrought iron that was 39 millimeters (1.5 in) thick. The deck was 20 millimeters (0.8 in) thick. The gun turret's armor was 149 millimeters (5.9 in) on its face. The conning tower protruded from the top of the turret and was protected by 208 millimeters (8.2 in) of armor. Garmer's commander was rather overtasked as this excerpt explains: "The Commander is stationed inside a cupola and stands by the steering gear where he must control the vessel's movements at the same time as filling the touch hole and firing the gun. Sometimes there are difficulties with the engine. Since the gun is fixed, training is by the movement of the vessel."

== Service ==
Garmer was launched in 1867 by Motala Verkstad at Norrköping and delivered the following year. When the Royal Skerry Artillery was dissolved in 1875 she was incorporated into the Swedish Navy. Garmer was sold for scrap in 1893.
