= Gaius S. Turner =

Canadian politician

Gaius Samuel Turner (August 12, 1838 – April 25, 1892) was a businessman and political figure in New Brunswick, Canada. He represented Albert County in the Legislative Assembly of New Brunswick from 1879 to 1892 as a Liberal-Conservative.

He was born and educated in Albert County, New Brunswick, the son of Isaac Turner and Elizabeth Colpitts. In 1876, he married Lucy E. Stiles. He was a justice of the peace. Turner was a ship builder in Harvey, New Brunswick, and also was a director for the Albert Railway. He was named to the province's Executive Council in 1883 but resigned later that year. He died in office at Fredericton at the age of 53 after a long illness.
