= Stellan Bojerud =

Swedish politician (1944–2015)

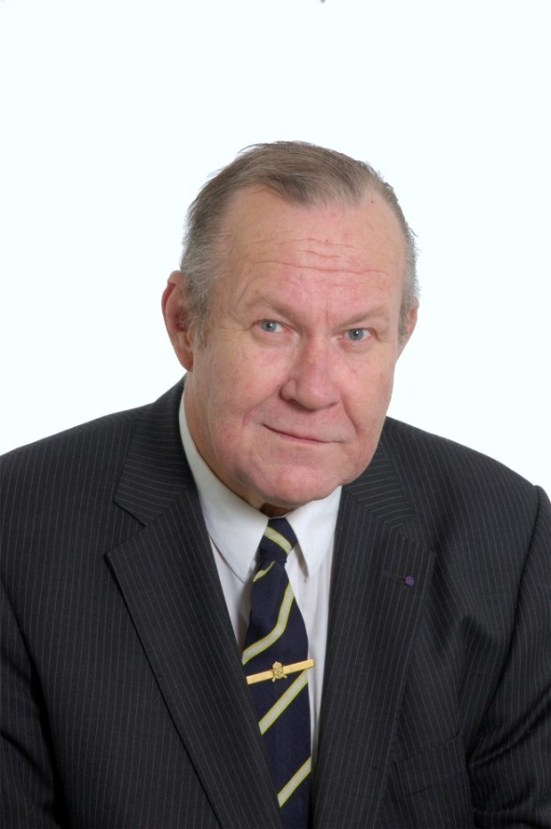
- Bojerud in 2010

Member of the Riksdag for Dalarna County
- In office 2012–2014

Personal details
- Born: Rolf Stellan Arno Bojerud; 5 August 1944 Danderyd, Sweden
- Died: 19 July 2015 (aged 70)
- Party: Sweden Democrats (2009–2015)
- Other political affiliations: Moderate Party (until 2009); Centre Party
- Spouse: Manora Kjellin-Bojerud
- Children: Fredrik Bojerud

Military service
- Allegiance: Sweden
- Branch/service: Swedish Army
- Years of service: 1966–2003
- Rank: Lieutenant colonel

Rolf Stellan Arno Bojerud (5 August 1944 – 19 July 2015) was a Swedish military historian and politician, representing the Sweden Democrats (SD) in the Riksdag.

== Biography ==
Bojerud joined the Swedish Army in the 1960s as a signal trooper. In 1990, he was promoted to lieutenant colonel and in 1993 he became head of the territorial defense section at the Stockholm defense area. From 1999 to 2002, he was the principal instructor of military history and head of the Military History Department at the Swedish Defence University until his retirement in 2003 and was involved in the university's teachings on Nazism and extremism.

From 2002 to 2003, Bojerud—who spoke fluent Dutch—was tasked with investigating the transition of the Netherlands from conscription to volunteer recruitment as well as the adaptation to network-based defence. As a military historian, he wrote work on the Spanish Civil War and Swedish naval history. He was one of the authors behind the pseudonym Harry Winter and the books Operation Garbo I–III, Narva and Poltava, which depict a fictional Soviet invasion of Sweden. He was also a columnist on military affairs for Svenska Dagbladet newspaper.

Bojerud had previously been a member of the Moderate Party and the Centre Party. and was a member of the municipal council of Sundbyberg for twenty years. In 2009, he joined the Sweden Democrats in opposition to the appointment of Sten Tolgfors as Swedish defense minister. Bojerud was the 22nd candidate on the list of SD in the 2010 parliamentary election. From 2010 to 2011 he was serving as an MP replacing Julia Kronlid during her absence for having a child. Following the death of William Petzäll in 2012 (who had been elected to parliament on the SD list), Bojerud became a member of parliament.

He died at the age of 70 in 2015. His son, Fredrik Bojerud, is also a politician.
