= HSwMS Sölve =

Swedish monitor warship

Coordinates: 57°42′33″N 11°57′36″E

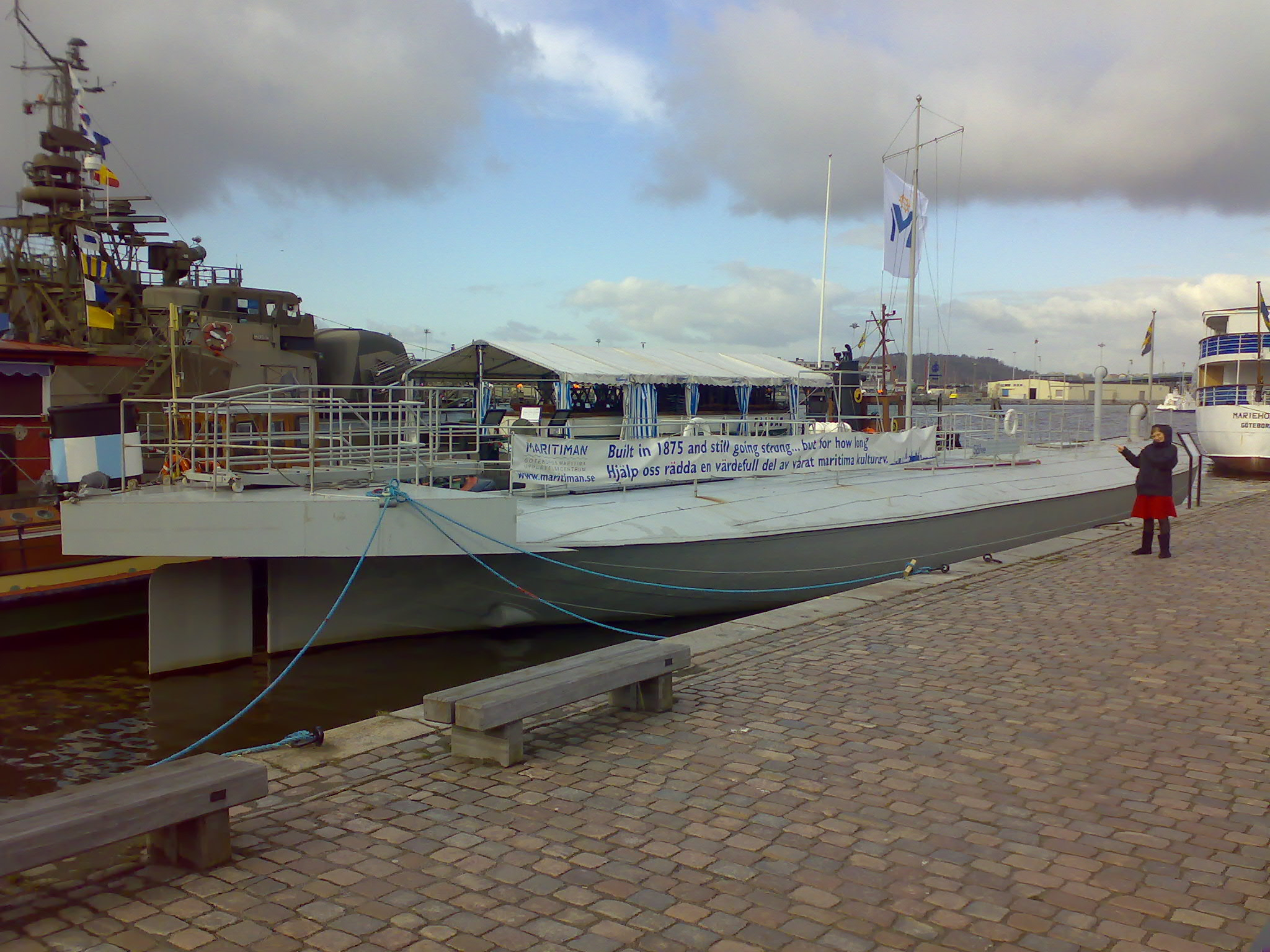
- Sölve as a museum ship

History

Sweden
- Name: Sölve
- Namesake: Sölve
- Builder: Ericsson-D'Ailly
- Launched: 1875
- Out of service: 1919
- Reclassified: Converted into an oil barge, 1919?
- Fate: Sold, 1919; Museum ship, Gothenburg, Sweden, 1992

General characteristics
- Type: Hildur-class monitor
- Displacement: 460 t (450 long tons) (deep load)
- Length: 39.78 m (130 ft 6 in)
- Beam: 8.72 m (28 ft 7 in)
- Draft: 2.7 m (8 ft 10 in)
- Installed power: 2 cylindrical boilers; 155 ihp (116 kW)
- Propulsion: 2 shafts, 2 horizontal-return connecting-rod steam engines
- Speed: 8 knots (15 km/h; 9.2 mph)
- Complement: 48
- Armament: 1 × 240 mm (9.4 in) M/69 gun; 2 × 76 mm (3 in) guns
- Armor: Belt: 76 mm (3 in); Gun turret: 356–418 mm (14.0–16.5 in); Deck: 19 mm (0.7 in); Conning tower: 254 mm (10 in)

HSwMS Sölve is one of seven Hildur-class monitors built for the Swedish Navy in the mid-1870s. The ship had an uneventful career and was sold in 1919 for conversion into a barge. She became a museum ship in Gothenburg, Sweden, in 1992.

== Design and description ==
The Hildur-class monitors were designed by Lieutenant John Christian d'Ailly, from a proposal by John Ericsson, for the defense of Lake Mälaren and the Stockholm archipelago. The ships were 39.78 meters (130 ft 6 in) long overall and had a beam of 8.72 meters (28 ft 7 in). They had a draft of 2.7 meters (8 ft 10 in) and displaced 460 metric tons (450 long tons). Her crew numbered 48 officers and men. The ship had rudders at bow and stern.

The Hildurs had a pair of two-cylinder horizontal-return connecting-rod steam engines, each driving a single propeller using steam from two cylindrical boilers. The engines produced a total of 155 indicated horsepower (116 kW) which gave the monitors a maximum speed of 8 knots (15 km/h; 9.2 mph). The ships carried 23–25 metric tons (23–25 long tons) of coal.

The monitors were equipped with one 240-millimeter (9.4 in) M/69 rifled breech loader, mounted in a long, fixed, oval-shaped gun turret. The gun weighed 14,670 kilograms (32,340 lb) and fired projectiles at a muzzle velocity of 397 m/s (1,300 ft/s). At its maximum elevation of 7.5° it had a range of 3,500 meters (3,800 yd). The Hildurs also mounted two 75-millimeter (3 in) guns. They were rearmed with a 120-millimeter (4.7 in) quick-firing gun as well as three 57-millimeter (2.2 in) quick-firing guns sometime in the 1890s or the early 1900s.

The Hildur class had a complete waterline armor belt of wrought iron that was 76 millimeters (3.0 in) thick with a 19-millimeter (0.7 in) deck. The face of the gun turret was protected by 418 millimeters (16.5 in) of armor, while its sides were 356 millimeters (14 in) thick. The conning tower protruded from the top of the turret and was protected by 254 millimeters (10 in) of armor.

== Construction and service ==
Sölve, named after Sölve, a semi-legendary King of Sweden, was launched in 1875 by Motala Verkstad at Norrköping. She was decommissioned in 1919 and was converted into an oil barge after she was sold. The ship was acquired by the Gothenburg Maritima Centrum from Mobiloil in 1992. It has been partially restored and is currently moored at the Maritiman marine museum in Gothenburg.
