= List of monitors of the Netherlands =

This is a list of monitors of the Netherlands navy.

- Buffel class
  - HNLMS Buffel (1868)
  - HNLMS Guinea (1868)
- Schorpioen class
  - HNLMS Schorpioen (1868)
  - HNLMS Stier (1870)
- Heiligerlee class
  - Krokodil (1867)
  - Heiligerlee (1868)
  - Tijger (1868)
- Bloedhond class
  - Bloedhond (1869)
  - Cerberus (1869)
- Adder class
  - Hyena (1870)
  - Panter (1870)
  - Adder (1871)
  - Haai (1871)
  - Wesp (1871)
  - Luipaard (1876)
- Draak (1877)
- Matador (1878)
- Reinier Claeszen (1891)

== See also ==
- List of cruisers of the Netherlands
- List of battleships of the Netherlands
- List of ships of the Royal Netherlands Navy

== Bibliography ==
- van Dijk, Anthonie (1988). "The Mysterious Floating Batteries of the Royal Netherlands Navy". Warship International. XXV (3): 229–238. ISSN 0043-0374.
