= List of ironclads =

The list of ironclads includes all steam-propelled warship (supplemented with sails in various cases) and protected by iron or steel armor plates that were built in the early part of the second half of the 19th century, between 1859 and the early 1890s. The list is arranged alphabetically by country. The initial dates of the boats correspond to the launch time, followed by a separation that indicates their retirement or final date.

The list includes ironclads of two different categories or roles, oceanic and coastal (the latter may be floating batteries, monitors and coastal defence ships). The various ironclads design such as the ram, broadside, central battery (or casemate), turret and barbette will be mentioned. (Note: These designs are for oceanic ironclads, although there were also coastal ironclads that used ram, casemate, turret and barbette.) Some of these ocean ironclads can be classified as armored frigates, armored corvettes, or others based on their displacement. Wooden hull ships that have been subsequently armored will also be considered in this list.

Although the introduction of the ironclad is clear-cut, the boundary between 'ironclad' and the later 'pre-dreadnought battleship' is less obvious, as the characteristics of the pre-dreadnought evolved from 1875 to 1895. For the sake of this article, a line is drawn around 1890, differing from country to country.

== Americas ==
=== Argentina ===
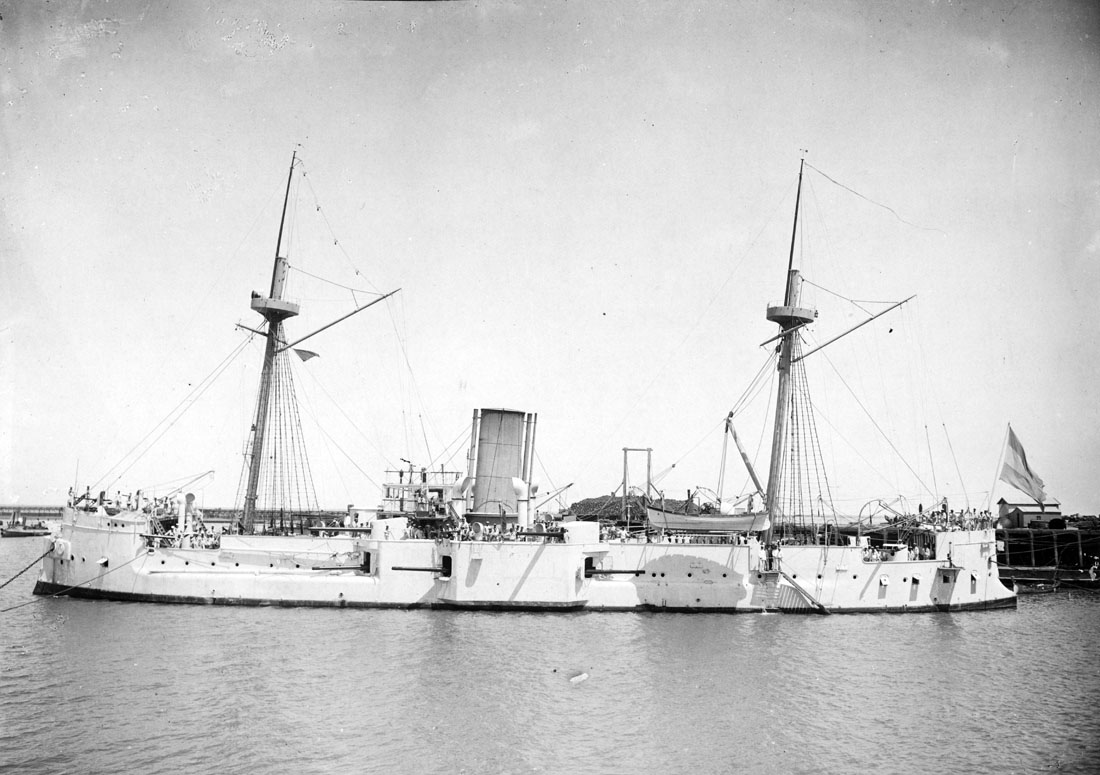
The Argentine Almirante Brown (1880) was the first ironclad built entirely of steel (until then it was made of iron).

Monitors

- El Plata class
  - El Plata (1874) - retired in 1927
  - Los Andes (1875) - retired in 1928

Central battery ironclad

- Almirante Brown (1880) - retired in 1932

Coastal defence ships

- Independencia class
  - Independencia (1891) - retired in 1946
  - Libertad (1892) - retired in 1946

=== Brazil ===
Central battery ironclads (or casemate)

- Brasil (1864) - retired in 1879
- Tamandaré (1865) - retired in 1879
- Barroso (1865) - retired in 1882
- Rio de Janeiro (1866) - sunk by floating mines ('torpedoes') in the River Paraguay in 1866, during Paraguayan War
- Mariz e Barros class
  - Mariz e Barros (1865) - stricken in 1897
  - Herval (1865) - stricken in 1885
- Cabral class
  - Cabral (1866) - stricken in 1885
  - Colombo (1866) - stricken in 1885
- Sete de Setembro (1874) - sunk after fire, during Fleet Revolt of 1893–94

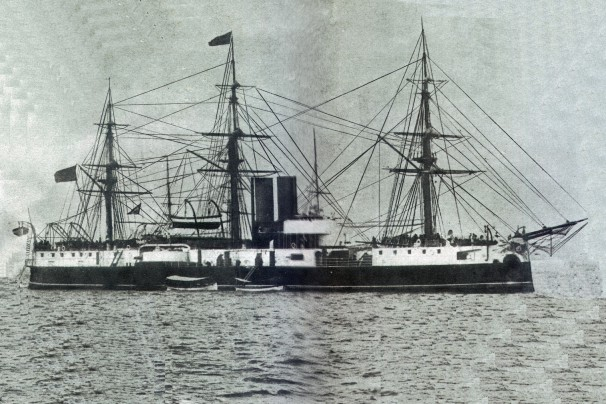
The Brazilian Riachuelo (1883).

Monitors

- Bahia (1865) - struck in 1894
- Pará class
  - Pará (1867) - discarded in 1884
  - Rio Grande (1867) - scrapped in 1907
  - Alagoas (1867) - scrapped in 1900
  - Piauí (1868) - scrapped in 1893
  - Ceará (1868) - scrapped in 1884
  - Santa Catharina (1868) - sank in 1882 at her moorings due to the poor condition of her hull
- Javary class
  - Javary (1874) - sunk in Battle on 22 November 1893, during Fleet Revolt of 1893–94
  - Solimões (1875) - it was wrecked in 1892 near the Cabo Polonio lighthouse in Uruguay

Ironclads turret ship

- Lima Barros (1865) - struck in 1894
- Silvado (1865) - struck in 1880
- Riachuelo (1883) - retired in 1910
- Aquidabã (1885) - sank after an explosion during a routine cruise in 1906

=== Chile ===
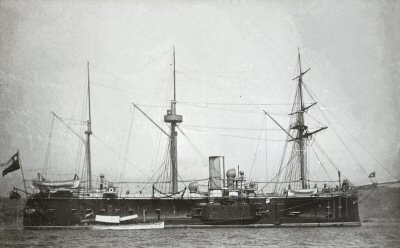
The Chilean Blanco Encalada (1875) was the first ironclad warship sunk by a self-propelled torpedo in 1891.

Central battery armored frigates

- Almirante Cochrane class
  - Almirante Cochrane (1874) - alienated in 1933
  - Blanco Encalada (1875) - sunk in 1891 in the Battle of Caldera Bay, during Chilean Civil War of 1891

Ironclad turret ship

- Huáscar* (1865, ex Peruvian ship) - captured in the Battle of Angamos in 1879 during War of the Pacific, retired in 1896 and turned into a historical relic in 1934

=== Haiti ===
Casemate ironclad

- Triumph (1861, ex British merchant Fingal and then USS Atlanta) - lost at sea in 1869 shortly after the purchase

=== Peru ===
Monitors

- Victoria (1864) - unknown ending
- Canonicus class
  - Atahualpa (1864, ex USS Catawba) - acquired in 1868 and sunk in the Blockade of Callao in 1881, during War of the Pacific
  - Manco Cápac (1864, ex USS Oneota) - acquired in 1868 and sunk in the Battle of Arica in 1880, during War of the Pacific

Broadside armored frigate

- Independencia (1865) - ran aground in the Battle of Punta Gruesa in 1879, during War of the Pacific

Ironclad turret ship

- Huáscar* (1865) - captured by the Chileans at the Battle of Angamos in 1879, during War of the Pacific

Casemate ironclad

- Loa (1854/1865) (Note: Built in 1854 as a wooden steamship and converted to a casemate ironclad in 1865.) - sunk in the Blockade of Callao in 1881, during War of the Pacific

=== United States ===
- Stevens Battery - ordered in 1841, but never completed.
- USS Essex (1861) - Steamship ferry New Era refitted as an ironclad in late 1861.
- USS Galena (1862)
- USS Benton (1862)
- USRC Naugatuck (1862) - operated by the United States Revenue-Marine during the American Civil War.
- USS New Ironsides (1862)
- USS Chillicothe (1862)
- USS Indianola (1862)
- USS Choctaw (1863)

City-class ironclads

- USS Carondelet (1862)
- USS Louisville (1862)
- USS Cincinnati (1862)
- USS Mound City (1862)
- USS Cairo (1862)
- USS Pittsburgh (1862)
- USS Baron DeKalb (1862)

== Asia ==
=== China ===
Coastal defence ships

- Tien-sing (after 1875) - unknown
- Pingyuan (1890) - captured by the Japanese in 1895 after Battle of Weihaiwei, during First Sino-Japanese War

Ironclads turret ship

- Dingyuan class
  - Dingyuan (1881) - sunk in 1895 in the Battle of Weihaiwei, during First Sino-Japanese War
  - Zhenyuan (1882) - captured by the Japanese in 1895 after the Battle of Weihaiwei, during First Sino-Japanese War

=== Japan ===
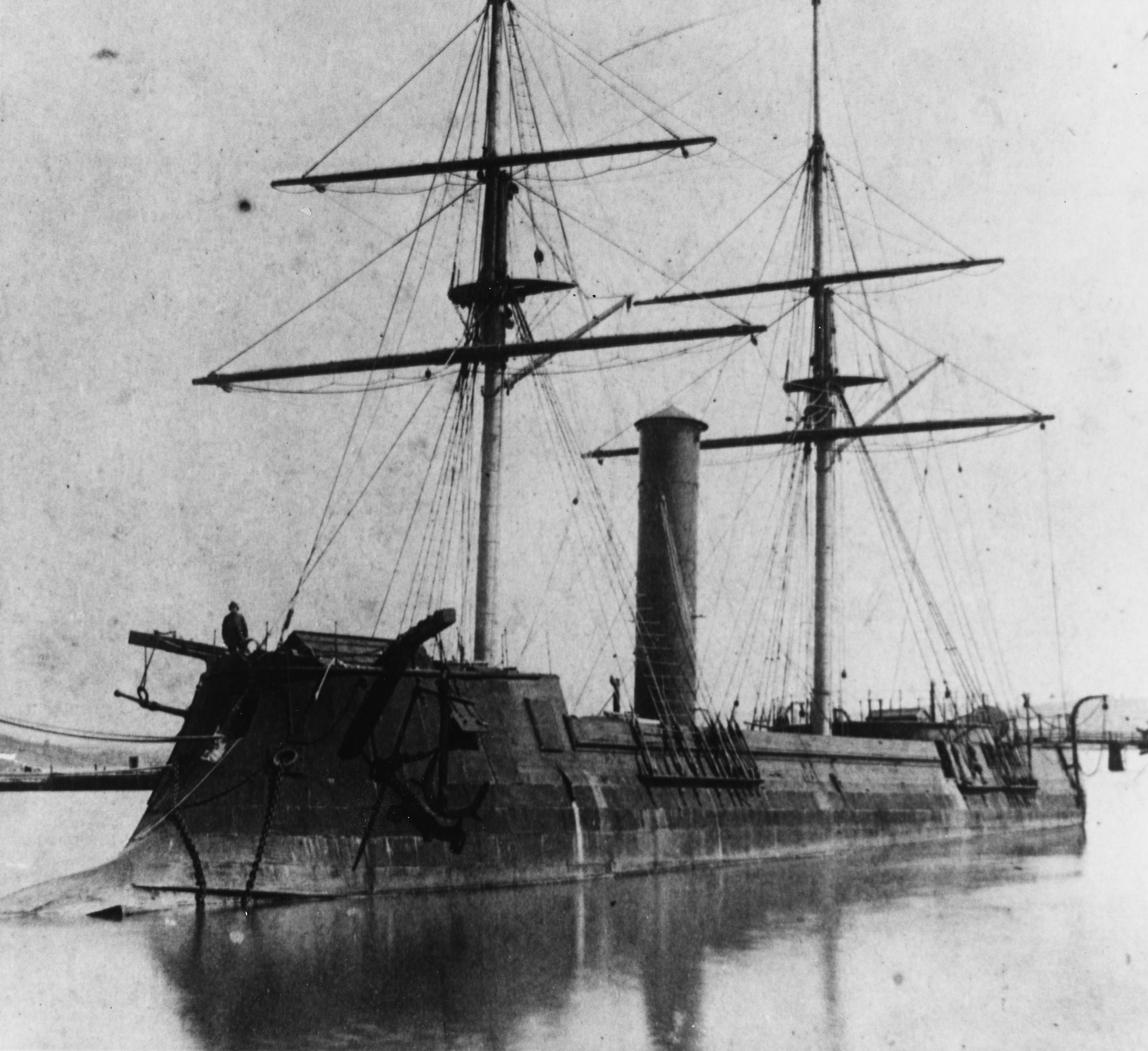
The Japanese Kōtetsu (1869) was an ironclad that played a decisive role in the Battle of Hakodate, during Boshin War.

Ironclad ram

- Kōtetsu* (1864, as CSS Stonewall) - acquired from the United States in 1869 and retired in 1888

Armoured corvettes

- Ryūjō (1869) - retired in 1906
- Kongō class
  - Kongō (1877) - retired in 1909
  - Hiei (1877) - retired in 1911

Central battery ironclad

- Fusō (1877) - sold for scrap in 1909

Ironclad turret ship

- Chin'en (1882, ex Chinese ship Zhenyuan) - captured in 1895 during First Sino-Japanese War and retired in 1911

Coastal defence ship

- Heien (1890, ex Chinese ship Pingyuan) - captured in 1895 during First Sino-Japanese War and sunk by adverse weather causes during Russo-Japanese War

=== Siam ===
Floating battery

- Siam Mongkut (1870) - probably discarded 1912

== Europe ==
=== Denmark ===
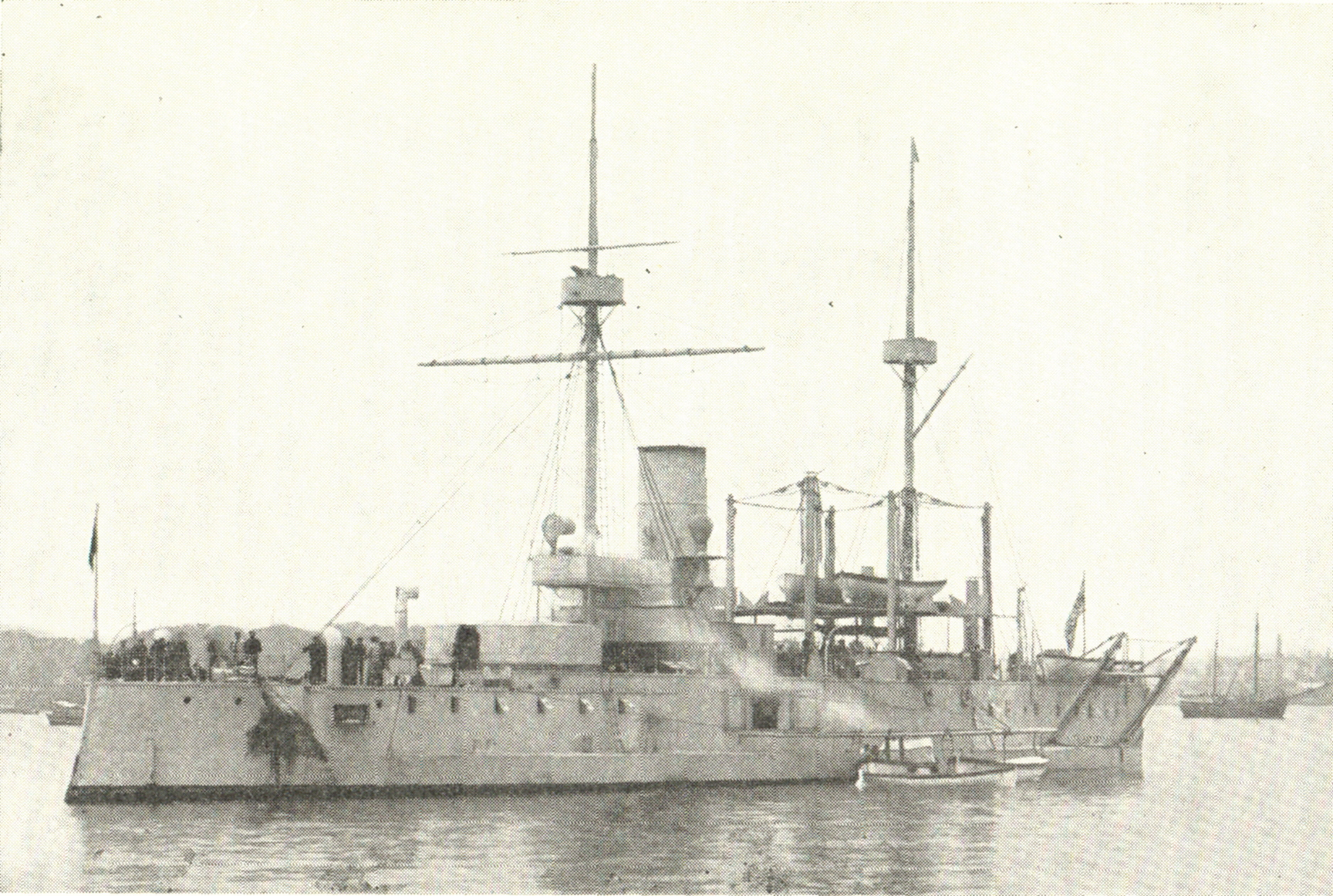
The Danish Helgoland (1878).

Broadside armored frigates

- Danmark (1864) - scrapped 1907
- Dannebrog (1850/1864) (Note: Originally it was a 70-gun ship that became an armored frigate between 1862 and 1864.) - retired in 1897
- Peder Skram (1864) - scrapped 1897

Ironclad turret ship

- Rolf Krake (1863) - scrapped 1907

Ironclad ram

- Stærkodder (1864, as CSS Stonewall) - the Danish purchase in 1864 of this ship failed and ended up being sold to Japan in 1867 and renamed Kōtetsu*

Monitors

- Lindormen (1868) - retired in 1907
- Gorm (1870) - retired in 1912

Casemate ironclad

- Odin (1872) - retired in 1912

Barbette ironclads

- Helgoland (1878) - retired in 1907
- Tordenskjold (1880) - retired in 1908
- Iver Hvitfeldt (1886) - retired in 1919

=== Greece ===
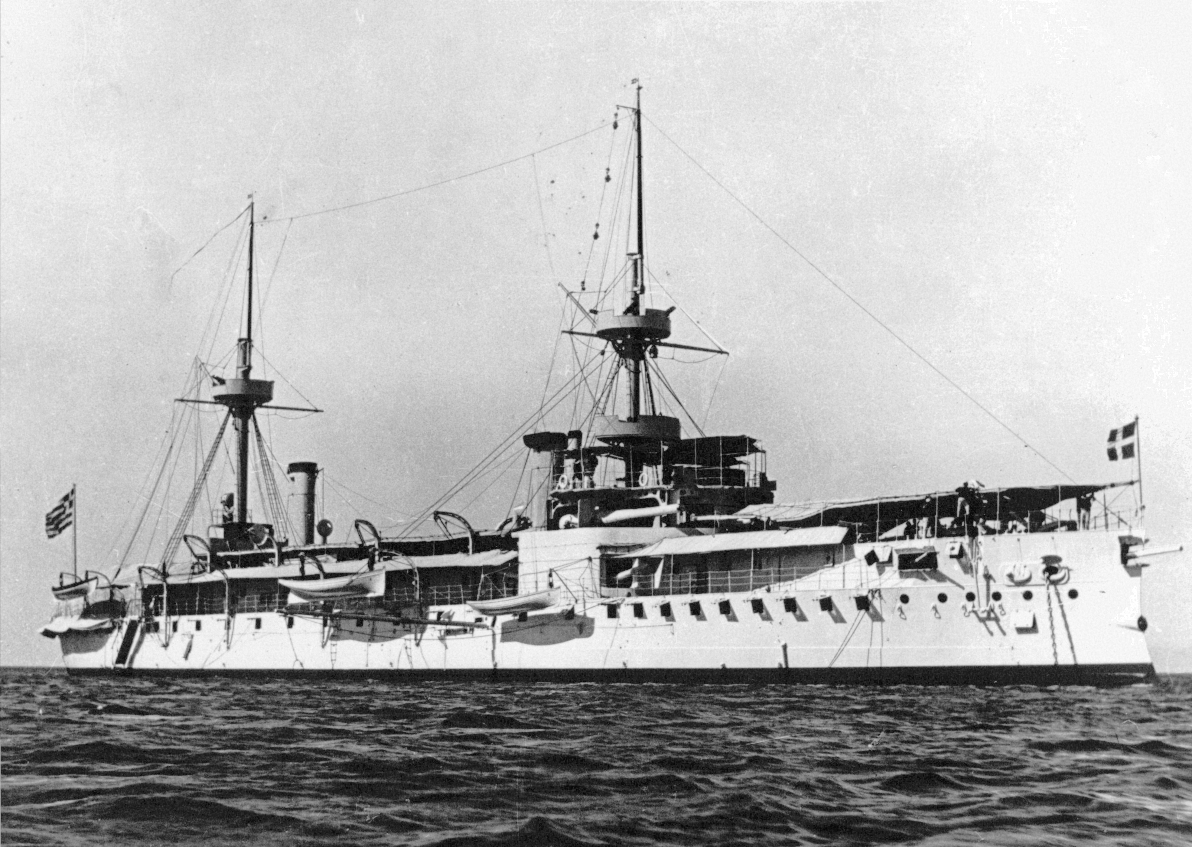
The Greek Hydra (1889).

Central battery armored corvette

- Vasilefs Georgios (1867) - scrapped in 1915

Broadside armored corvette

- Vasilissa Olga (1869) - scrapped in 1925

Barbette ironclads

- Hydra class
  - Hydra (1889) - retired in 1919
  - Spetsai (1889) - retired in 1929
  - Psara (1890) - sold for scrap in 1932

=== Netherlands ===
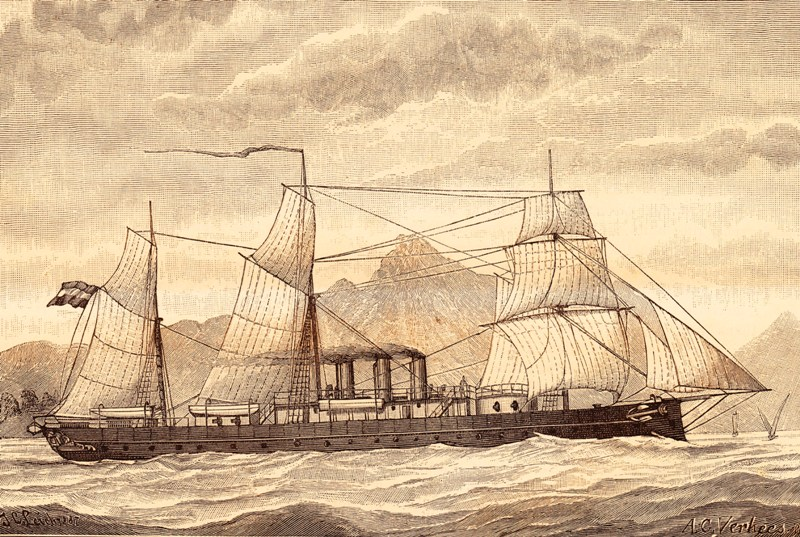
The Dutch Koning der Nederlanden (1874) was the largest ship that served in the Dutch Navy during the 19th century.

Casemate ironclad

- De Ruyter (1853/1863) (Note: It was converted into a casemate ironclad between 1961 and 1863.) - unknown

Ironclads turret ship

- Prins Hendrik der Nederlanden (1866) - scrapped after 1905
- Koning der Nederlanden (1874) - scuttled in 1942, during World War II

Monitors

- Buffel class
  - Buffel (1868) - retired in 1973 and converted into a museum ship in 1974
  - Guinea (1870) - sold for scrap in 1897
- Schorpioen class
  - Schorpioen (1868) - converted into a museum ship in 1982
  - Stier (1868) - struck in 1908
- Heiligerlee class
  - Heiligerlee (1868) - sold for scrapping in 1910
  - Krokodil (1868) - unknown
  - Tijger (1868) - unknown
- Bloedhond class
  - Bloedhond (1869) - unknown
  - Cerberus (1869) - unknown
- Adder class
  - Hyena (1870) - unknown
  - Panter (1870) - unknown
  - Adder (1871) - unknown
  - Haai (1871) - unknown
  - Wesp (1871) - unknown
  - Luipaard (1876) - unknown
- Draak (1877) - unknown
- Matador (1878) - unknown
- Reinier Claeszen (1891) - unknown

=== Norway ===
Monitors

- Skorpionen class
  - Skorpionen (1866) - scrapped in 1908
  - Thrudvang (1869) - scrapped in 1918
- John Ericsson class
  - Mjølner (1868) - scrapped in 1909
- Thor (1872) - wrecked in 1919

=== Portugal ===
Central battery ironclad

- Vasco da Gama (1876) - broken up in 1935 (in Portugal was considered a battleship)

=== Spain ===
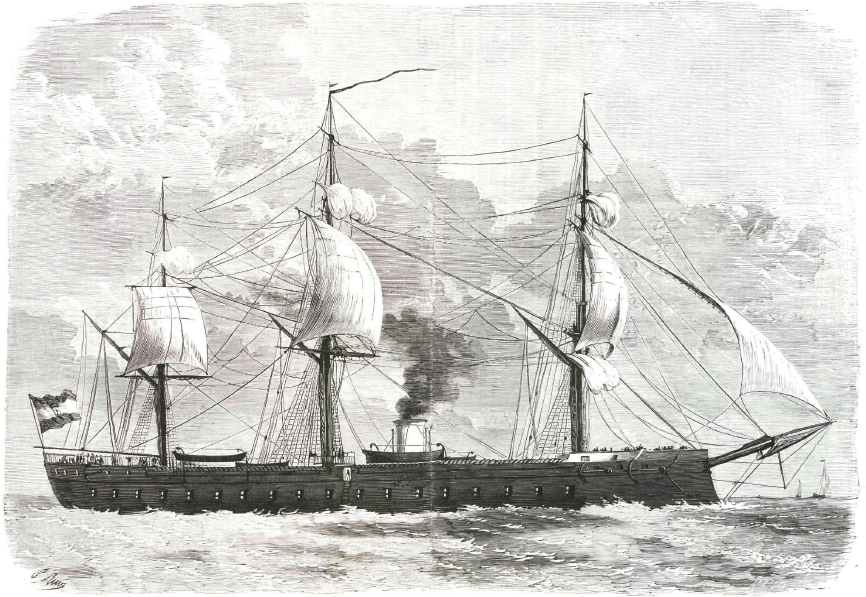
The Spanish Numancia (1863) was the first ironclad to circumnavigate the world, between 1865 and 1867.

Broadside armored frigates

- Tetuán (1863) - sunk by accident or sabotage in the siege of Cartagena in 1873, during Cantonal rebellion
- Numancia (1863) - retired in 1912
- Arapiles (1864) - scrapped in 1883
- Vitoria (1865) - retired in 1911

Central battery armored frigates

- Zaragoza (1867) - stricken in 1896
- Sagunto (1869) - retired in 1896
- Méndez Núñez (1861/1870) (Note: It was a steam frigate called Resolución that in 1870 ended up being converted into an armored frigate of the central battery, adopting the new name of Méndez Núñez.) - scrapped in 1896

Floating battery

- Duque de Tetuán (1874) - retired in 1900

Monitor

- Puigcerdá (1874) - retired in 1900

Barbette ironclad

- Pelayo (1887) - scrapped in 1925

=== Sweden ===
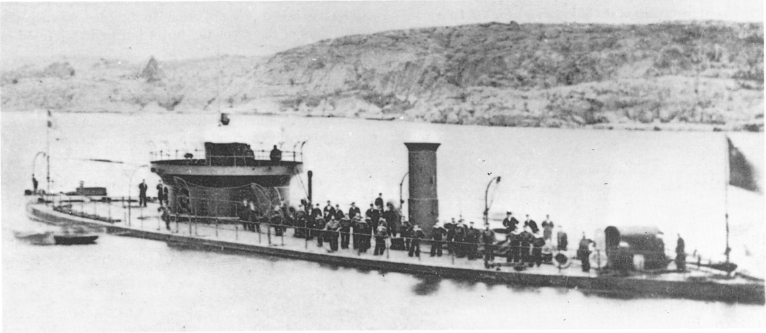
The Swedish John Ericsson (1865), part of a class of five monitors, was designed under the supervision of the Swedish-born inventor, John Ericsson, and built in Sweden.

Monitors

- John Ericsson class
  - HSwMS John Ericsson (1865) - sold in 1919
  - HSwMS Thordön (1865) - sold in 1922
  - HSwMS Tirfing (1866) - sold for scrap in 1922
  - HSwMS Loke (1869) - scrapped in 1908
- HSwMS Garmer (1867) - sold for scrap in 1893
- HSwMS Sköld (1868) - sunk as a target in 1907
- HSwMS Fenris (1872) - retired in 1903
- Hildur class
  - HSwMS Hildur (1872) - sold in 1919
  - HSwMS Gerda (1872) - retired in 1919
  - HSwMS Ulf (1873) - sold in 1919
  - HSwMS Berserk (1874) - sold in 1919
  - HSwMS Björn (1874) - sold in 1919
  - HSwMS Sölve (1875) - sold in 1919
  - HSwMS Folke (1875) - decommissioned in 1919

Coastal defence ships

- Svea class
  - Svea (1885) - retired in 1941
  - Göta (1889) - retired in 1923
  - Thule (1893) - retired in 1923

== See also ==
- List of battleships
- List of cruisers
- List of battlecruisers

== Bibliography ==
- Gardiner, Robert, ed. (1979). Conway's All the World's Fighting Ships 1860–1905. London, UK: Conway Maritime Press. ISBN 0-85177-133-5.
