= Adder-class monitor =

Group of Royal Netherlands Navy ships

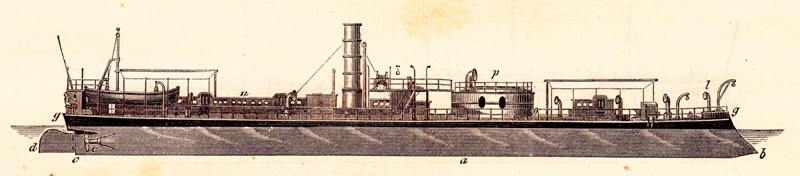

Class overview
- Name: Adder class
- Operators: Royal Netherlands Navy
- Preceded by: Heiligerlee class
- Succeeded by: Draak
- Completed: 6
- Lost: 1
- Scrapped: 5

General characteristics (as completed)
- Class & type: Adder-class monitor
- Displacement: 1,555–1,585 long tons (1,580–1,610 t)
- Length: 192.25–195.4 ft (58.6–59.6 m) (o/a)
- Beam: 44 ft (13.4 m)
- Draft: 9 ft 9 in (3.0 m)
- Installed power: 560–740 ihp (420–550 kW)
- Speed: 7–8 knots (13–15 km/h; 8.1–9.2 mph)
- Complement: 117
- Armament: 1 × twin 23 cm Armstrong RML or; 1 × 28 cm A No. 1 (initially Luipaard only)
- Armor: Belt: 5.5 in (140 mm); Gun turrets: 8–11 in (203–279 mm)

The Adder-class monitors were a group of six ironclad monitors built for the Royal Netherlands Navy in the 1870s.

== Context ==
The Adder class monitors very much resembled the preceding Heiligerlee class. There were some small differences, but the main difference was that the Adder class got a ram, which was very popular after the Battle of Lissa.

Haai would become the first monitor to be built by a private Dutch shipyard.

== Armament ==
Just like the preceding Heiligerlee class, the Adders were armed with two 23 cm Armstrong rifled muzzle loaders. Luipaard differed by having only a single Krupp 28 cm breechloader, known as 28 cm A No. 1.

Later all ships of the class were re-armed with the 28 cm A No. 1, except Adder, which sank beforehand.

== Ships ==
| Ship | Builder | Laid down | Launched | Completed |
|---|---|---|---|---|
| HNLMS Panter | Rijkswerf, Amsterdam | 25 Nov. 1869 | 19 Oct. 1870 | |
| HNLMS Hyena | Rijkswerf, Amsterdam | 25 Nov. 1869 | 22 Dec. 1870 | |
| HNLMS Haai | Fijenoord, Rotterdam | May 1870 | 20 May 1871 | |
| HNLMS Adder | Rijkswerf, Amsterdam | | 28 Sep. 1871 | |
| HNLMS Wesp | Rijkswerf, Amsterdam | | 28 December 1871 | |
| HNLMS Luipaard | Fijenoord, Rotterdam | 14 September 1875 | 14 September 1876 | Sold, 6 June 1907 |

== See also ==
- List of ironclads
