= Heiligerlee-class monitor =

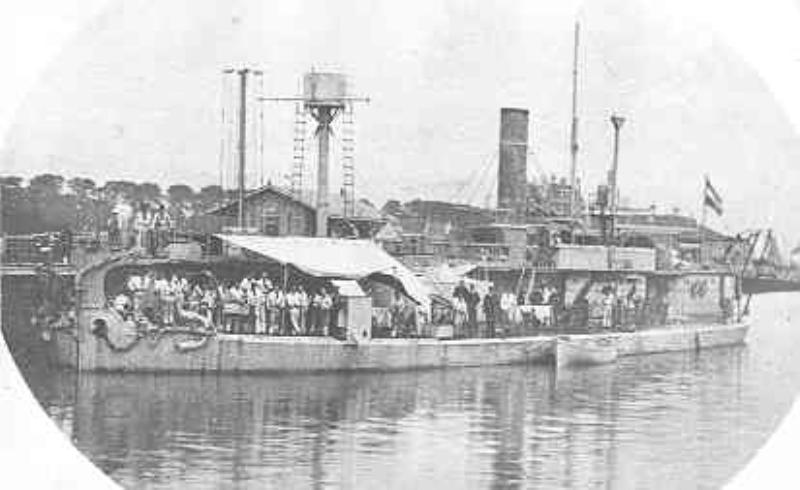
- Heiligerlee

Class overview
- Name: Heiligerlee class
- Builders: United Kingdom; Laird Brothers (2); Robert Napier & Sons (1); Netherlands; State Shipyard (Amsterdam) (2)
- Operators: Royal Netherlands Navy
- Succeeded by: Adder class
- Completed: 5

General characteristics (as completed)
- Class & type: Heiligerlee-class monitor
- Displacement: 1,555–1,585 long tons (1,580–1,610 t)
- Length: 192.25–195.4 ft (58.6–59.6 m) (o/a)
- Beam: 44 ft (13.4 m)
- Draft: 9 ft 9 in (3.0 m)
- Installed power: 560–740 ihp (420–550 kW)
- Speed: 7–8 knots (13–15 km/h; 8.1–9.2 mph)
- Complement: 117
- Armament: 1 × twin 23 cm Armstrong RML; Later replaced by single 28 cm A No. 1 breechloader
- Armor: Belt: 5.5 in (140 mm); Gun turrets: 8–11 in (203–279 mm)

The Heiligerlee-class monitors were a group of five ironclad monitors built for the Royal Netherlands Navy in the late 1860s.

== Context ==
=== Turret ship and Monitor ===
The 1850s and 60's showed that wooden ships could easily be destroyed by Paixhans guns, which fired explosive shells. The ironclad (the first armored ship) was developed to counter these explosive shells. In effect, ships like the French Gloire and the English Warrior were almost immune to any artillery of traditional size. They could only be destroyed by guns much heavier than those that were in use at the time they were launched.

Therefore, the introduction of the ironclad led to an escalation in the size of artillery pieces. As a consequence, the traditional broadside arrangement, that could not be used effectively for very heavy guns, was abandoned for designs that mounted only a few very heavy guns in turrets. It led to the development of ironclads that mounted their guns in turrets. It came in two types: The Turret ship and the Monitor.

The Turret ship type was seaworthy and normally had one or two turrets with two very heavy guns each. The Monitor type had one comparable turret with such guns and had comparable armor. Its draft was shallower and made it necessary to lower the free-board, thereby presenting a smaller target. The downside of the monitor type was a very limited seaworthiness.

=== Dutch Awareness of technological developments ===
One might wonder whether the Dutch were aware of the technological innovations of the time. The 'Omwenteling in het Zeewezen' published in 1864, shows that the Dutch were quite aware of international developments. The proof that the government and representative bodies understood these developments is in the dramatic (temporary) increase of the Dutch naval budget in the late 1860s.

=== A commission proposes to build many monitors ===
The quick defeat of the Danes in the Second Schleswig War made a big impression on the Dutch public. Therefore, the Dutch government appointed a commission to review the coastal defense (Commissie tot het herzien der kustverdediging) on 3 June 1864. It was a commission that investigated all aspects of defending against a sea-side attack. It even assumed a simultaneous attack from land and sea. It would not investigate the requirements for fighting on the high seas. Lieutenant-Captain Jansen was one of its members. After only months, it sent its report on 22 oct 1864.

The report demanded that all ships meant for coastal defense would not have a draught deeper than 3.3m. This would allow combinations of high speed and heavy armor, or heavy armor and heavy artillery. These ships could operate on any river, and would still be able to operate in deeper waters, and on the coast if weather permitted. The report then specified two kinds of ships for coastal defense: the Steam Ram type, and the Monitor type. The monitor's draught would be even more limited at 2.4m, so it could enter all kinds of small harbors. With regard to speed the report thought that 10 knots would be enough. The commission also mentioned that the already existing floating batteries should be kept in service and two more steam batteries should be built. The new steam batteries should have a draught of no more than 5.8m.

With regard to artillery for coastal defense, the commission wanted to ensure that new artillery would actually be able to sink armored ships. It stated that experiments in France had shown that in order to penetrate an armored ship, a projectile of 80 kg was needed. Furthermore, that experiments in England had shown that the smooth-bore 68-pounder and the rifled Armstrong 110-pounder (50 kg), could not inflict significant damage to an armored ship. For ships, the commission demanded that they should mount guns of the highest caliber they could bear. Via the reference it made to the work of Jansen, one could assert that it thought 9inch (229mm) guns were the minimum.

As regards numbers, the commission called for 3 steam rams, 8 monitors and 3 steam batteries in the north of the Netherlands. In the south 4 steam rams, 6 monitors and 2 floating batteries were necessary.

=== Approval for buying the monitors ===
The report was made during the ministry of Willem Huyssen van Kattendijke, that lasted from 14 March 1861 until 6 February 1866. In January 1865 the Dutch parliament asked to see the report of the commission. It was October 1865 when the report was finally sent to the 'Tweede Kamer', in the printed version some content was omitted. An obvious explanation for keeping the report 'secret' for over a year was that in late September 1864 the secretary for the navy had been granted the first term for: 'a floating battery, also usable as ram, necessary for coast and river defense'. After it had been ordered, the design for this ship was changed in order to make it seaworthy. The resulting Prins Hendrik went 60% over the budget of 1,000,000 guilders, had little to do with coastal defense, and would soon be sent to the Dutch East Indies. Huyssen van Kattendijke had spent money on a goal different from that for which it had been granted, and had grossly overspent. He survived the debate, but had to promise not to build any more ships like the Prins Hendrik without explicit consent.

On 1 June 1866 G.C.C. Pels Rijcken became the new secretary for the navy, keeping that office till 4 June 1868. Pels Rijcken was more sensitive to the concerns of parliament. In September 1866 he launched a program to acquire the ships proposed by the commission for coastal defense. He raised the naval budget for 1867 by 2,162,697 to 11,205,743 guilders. It would by used to order a steam ram and two monitors in England, as well as for the final payments on the Hendrik. In early 1867 the government enlarged this plan to three monitors instead of two, and three (seaworthy) Ram Turret ships (of 1,100,000 guilders each) instead of 1 steam ram, raising the budget by 3,450,000 guilders.

The acceptance of such a sudden and dramatic increase in expenditure can only be explained by the rising international tensions of the Luxembourg Crisis. These made that the Dutch government left its strategy to order only a few examples abroad and build the other ships in the Netherlands, giving more work to Dutch industry. Now three Ram Turrets were built abroad, and three monitors were built in the United Kingdom. Later on two monitors were built in the Netherlands.

== Design ==
By late 1866 the Dutch were still busy developing their ability to manufacture armored ships, but were not yet able to do this independently. The positive reactions to the Prins Hendrik probably made that the Dutch government asked Laird Brothers to make a design based upon the specifications of the committee. That is a ship of 2.4m draught, decent armor and armed with two 229mm guns. The final design had a larger draft of 3m, in all probability as a result of trying to make the ship meet the requirements for arms and armor.

=== Armament ===
There were some solid reasons for the initial armament of the Heiligerlee class with two 229mm muzzle-loaders. The 229mm caliber was thought to be the minimum that was required to sink an armored ship. With the requirements for maximum draft, it was also thought unwise to exceed this minimum. Further reasons were that the 229 mm guns were already in use on Prins Hendrik, and were in wide use in the English fleet. The choice for a muzzle-loader over a breech-loader had to do with all kinds of problems with contemporary breech-loaders.

In the 1880s many of the Heilgerlee class ships were re-armed. The two 23 cm muzzle-loading armstrong guns were replaced by a single 28 cm L/22 breech loading Krupp gun, known in Holland as 28 cm A No. 1. This gun was 22 calibers long. The '28 cm A. No 2', on board the later protected cruiser Koninging Wilhelmina was 30 calibers long. The standard designation for the new guns of the Heiligerlee class was Krupp 28 cm RKL/22 C/74. It was noted that one 28 cm gun with carriage weighed 32,300 kg, i.e. 1,748 kg more than two Armstrong guns with carriage.

In spite of later criticism, this choice for the 28 cm/L22 was probably a good choice at the time the Dutch government decided to rearm the class. The contemporary Colossus class battleships had the first English breech loader, the 12 inch naval gun Mk I, and with a length of 25 calibers this was not much longer. However, developments in artillery were proceeding at high speed. By the time the Heiligerlee and Tijger were re-armed in 1886, the Dutch were equipping some gunboats with the superior '28 cm A. No 2'. This gun fired an AP shell of 345 kg instead of 255 kg, with a reach of 8,775 m instead of 6.600 m. One can suppose that the appearance of these longer guns and the circumstance that they probably did not fit on the monitors put an end to the re-armament program.

Some of the ships of the class, like Cerberus, also got new tower armor. It meant that the pure iron armor on the tower was replaced by compound armor, consisting of iron with a steel plate on the outside.

== Ships ==
=== Heiligerlee (ex. Panter) ===
The Heiligerlee has its own page.

=== Krokodil ===
When the Krokodil received its name in August 1867, it was already under construction in Birkenhead.

=== Tijger ===
When the Tijger received its name in August 1867, it was already under construction in Glasgow.

=== Cerberus ===
The Cerberus has its own page.

| Ship | Builder | Laid down | Launched | In service | Rearmed | End |
|---|---|---|---|---|---|---|
| HNLMS Heiligerlee, (ex. Panter) | Laird Brs., Birkenhead | 1867 | 14 Jan. 1868 | 26 May 1868 | | Sold 21 April 1910 |
| HNLMS Krokodil | Laird Brs., Birkenhead | 1867 | 13 Feb 1868 | 21 July 1870 | | Sold, 19 June 1906 |
| HNLMS Tijger | Napier, Glasgow | | 22 Feb. 1868 | 16 June 1869 | | For auction Dec. 1895 |
| HNLMS Cerberus | Rijkswerf, Amsterdam | 30 Nov. 1867 | 14 Jan. 1869 | 21 July 1870 | 1882-1883 | Sold 23 May 1906 |
| HNLMS Bloedhond | Rijkswerf, Amsterdam | 16 Dec. 1867 | 15 Sep. 1869 | | | Sold, 6 June 1907 |

== See also ==
- List of ironclads
