= List of shipwrecks in July 1882 =

The list of shipwrecks in July 1882 includes ships sunk, foundered, grounded, or otherwise lost during July 1882.

== 4 July ==
List of shipwrecks: 4 July 1882
Ship	State	Description
Rose	Germany	The schooner collided with the barque Shakespeare (United Kingdom) and was abandoned. Her crew were rescued by Shakespeare. Rose was on a voyage from Gallipoli to Antwerp, Belgium. She was subsequently towed in to Ferrol, Spain by the steamship Vicenta (Spain).
Scioto	United States	The steamship was sunk in a collision with the steamship John Lomas (United States) off Mingo Junction, Ohio in the Ohio River, sinking partially submerged in 16 feet (4.9 m) of water. Raised, repaired and returned to service under the name Regular. Death estimates range from 58 to more than 75.

== 5 July ==
List of shipwrecks: 5 July 1882
Ship	State	Description
HNLMS Adder	Royal Netherlands Navy	The Adder-class monitor sank with the loss of 65 lives.
Norwood	United Kingdom	The barque was wrecked on the Proparis Shoal, 63 nautical miles (117 km) off Diamond Island, Burma. Her crew were rescued.
Unnamed	(Ottoman Empire) Egypt	The lighter was run into by the steamship Laleham (United Kingdom) and sank a Port Said.

== 6 July ==
List of shipwrecks: 6 July 1882
Ship	State	Description
New York City	United States	The ship ran aground on the Swash, in the Bristol Channel off the coast of Somerset, United Kingdom. She was on a voyage from Bristol, Gloucestershire, United Kingdom to New York. She was later refloated and resumed her voyage.

== 7 July ==
List of shipwrecks: 7 July 1882
Ship	State	Description
Blenheim, and Kairos	United Kingdom	The steamships collided at Penarth, Glamorgan and were both severely damaged. Both vessels were beached.
Toward	United Kingdom	The steamship collided with the steamship Tenasserim (United Kingdom) in the Clyde and was severely damaged with the loss of a crew member. Toward was on a voyage from Glasgow, Renfrewshire to Cork. She put back to Glasgow.

== 8 July ==
List of shipwrecks: 8 July 1882
Ship	State	Description
North Star	United States	The barque-rigged steamship was crushed by ice in the Arctic Ocean 2.5 nautical miles (4.6 km; 2.9 mi) off Point Barrow, Department of Alaska. Her crew survived.

== 9 July ==
List of shipwrecks: 9 July 1882
Ship	State	Description
Fleurs Castle	United Kingdom	The steamship was wrecked at Cape Guardafui, Majeerteen Sultanate with the loss of 33 of the 49 people on board. She was on a voyage from Hankou, China to London.
Moskwa	Russia	The steamship was wrecked at Ras Hafun, Majeerteen Sultanate. All 120 passengers and crew survived. She was on a voyage from Hankow to Odesa.

== 10 July ==
List of shipwrecks: 10 July 1882
Ship	State	Description
Emma, and Erin	United Kingdom	The ships collided near New Brighton, Cheshire and were both severely damaged.

== 12 July ==
List of shipwrecks: 12 July 1882
Ship	State	Description
Foam	United Kingdom	The schooner was wrecked near Port Isaac, Cornwall. She was on a voyage from Cowes, Isle of Wight to Bristol, Gloucestershire.

== 13 July ==
List of shipwrecks: 13 July 1882
Ship	State	Description
Glenlyon	United Kingdom	The steamship ran aground in the Suez Canal. She was on a voyage from Fuzhou, China to London.
Vindobala	United Kingdom	The steamship ran aground in the Suez Canal. She was on a voyage from Bombay, India to South Shields, County Durham.

== 15 July ==
List of shipwrecks: 15 July 1882
Ship	State	Description
Oscar	United Kingdom	The steamship collided with the steamship Breeze (United Kingdom) and sank in the North Sea off Flamborough Head, Yorkshire. Oscar was on a voyage from London to Middlesbrough, Yorkshire.

== 16 July ==
List of shipwrecks: 16 July 1882
Ship	State	Description
John Wilson	United States	The steamship struck a snag and sank in the Atchafalaya River. Lost with 3 passengers and 12 hands.

== 18 July ==
List of shipwrecks: 18 July 1882
Ship	State	Description
City of Amsterdam	United Kingdom	The steamship ran aground at Porto, Portugal. She was on a voyage from London to Porto. She was refloated and beached, being leaky.

== 19 July ==
List of shipwrecks: 19 July 1882
Ship	State	Description
Annie Gertrude	United Kingdom	The Thames barge collided with the paddle steamer Invicta (United Kingdom) and sank in the River Thames at Tilbury, Essex. Her crew were rescued.
HMS Assistance	Royal Navy	The troopship ran aground on the Boulder Bank, in the English Channel off the coast of Sussex due to the Owers Lightship ( Trinity House) being out of position. She was on a voyage from Chatham, Kent to Portsmouth, Hampshire. She was refloated and completed her voyage.
Brothers	United Kingdom	The schooner collided with the steamship Ardeer (United Kingdom) and sank at Barrow-in-Furness, Lancashire.

== 21 July ==
List of shipwrecks: 21 July 1882
Ship	State	Description
Helios	Germany	The schooner was wrecked in the Rio Grande. Her crew were rescued.
Zaritza	Norway	The steamship ran aground at "Stubben", Denmark. She was on a voyage from Danzig, Germany to Ipswich, Suffolk, United Kingdom. She was refloated and taken in to Copenhagen, Denmark.

== 22 July ==
List of shipwrecks: 22 July 1882
Ship	State	Description
Mayfly	United Kingdom	The schooner was run into by the steamship Valhalla (Flag unknown) and sank off Dungeness. Kent. Her captain and three crew drowned, six crew and four passengers survived.
Sparkling Wave	United Kingdom	The ship sprung a leak and foundered 200 miles (320 km) north of the Isla de Mona, Puerto Rico while bound for Hamburg with guano. Her crew were rescued by the brigantine Familieus (Denmark).

== 23 July ==
List of shipwrecks: 23 July 1882
Ship	State	Description
Sparkling Wave	United Kingdom	The schooner was abandoned in the Atlantic Ocean (68°30′N 20°30′W). Her crew were rescued by the brigantine Familiens Haab (Denmark). Sparkling Wave is on a voyage from "Oruba" to Hamburg, Germany.

== 24 July ==
List of shipwrecks: 24 July 1882
Ship	State	Description
Surprise	United States	The sealer and whaler, a schooner, was wrecked on "Basket Island", Chile. Her crew were rescued.

== 25 July ==
List of shipwrecks: 25 July 1882
Ship	State	Description
Hildegarde	United Kingdom	The ship was sighted whilst on a voyage from San Francisco, California, United States to Queenstown, County Cork. No further trace, reported missing.

== 26 July ==
List of shipwrecks: 26 July 1882
Ship	State	Description
Albert	United Kingdom	The dandy was driven ashore at Newhaven, Sussex.

== 28 July ==
List of shipwrecks: 28 July 1882
Ship	State	Description
Svelto	Italy	The brig was wrecked on Flores Island, Azores. Her crew were rescued. She was on a voyage from Rio de Janeiro, Brazil to Falmouth, Cornwall, United Kingdom.

== 29 July ==
List of shipwrecks: 29 July 1882
Ship	State	Description
Persey	United Kingdom	The ship sank off Hale Head.

== 30 July ==
List of shipwrecks: 30 July 1882
Ship	State	Description
Cats	Netherlands	The steamship was sighted off Helsingør, Denmark whilst on a voyage from Riga, Russia to Rotterdam, South Holland. No further trace, reported missing.
Colchester	United Kingdom	The full-rigged ship ran aground in the Weser. She was on a voyage from New York, United States to Bremerhaven, Germany.
Daybreak	United Kingdom	The ship struck a sunken rock in the White Sea 10 nautical miles (19 km) off Cross Island, Russia. She put in to Arkhangelsk, Russia in a waterlogged condition.
Saint Malo	United Kingdom	The steamship was driven ashore near Yarmouth, Isle of Wight. She was on a voyage from Southampton to Jersey, Channel Islands. She was refloated and resumed her voyage.

== Unknown date ==
List of shipwrecks: Unknown date in July 1882
Ship	State	Description
Algiers	United Kingdom	The ship was driven ashore on Green Island. She was on a voyage from Quebec City, Canada to Leith, Lothian. She was condemned.
Dora Tully	United Kingdom	The steamship ran aground on the Hiver Rocks, off Cape Takli, Russia before 28 July.
Framnaes	Norway	The barque collided with an iceberg and sank. Her crew were rescued by Lindo (Flag unknown). Framnaes was on a voyage from Gothenburg, Sweden to Philadelphia, Pennsylvania, United States.
Mary Ann	United Kingdom	The schooner was wrecked on Neuwerk, Germany. Her crew survived. She was on a voyage from Fraserburgh, Aberdeenshire to Hamburg, Germany.
Pandora	Germany	The brig was towed in to Cuxhaven in a waterlogged condition. She was on a voyage from Riga, Russia to Chatham, Kent, United Kingdom.
Peruvian Congress	Canada	The ship foundered in the Indian Ocean 100 nautical miles (190 km) off Diamond Island, Burma with the loss of her captain. She was on a voyage from Calcutta, India to Boston, Massachusetts, United States.
San Jacinto	Spain	The steamship ran aground on the Bueno Esperanza Bank, 24 nautical miles (44 km) off Cape Cruz, Cuba.
Seadrift	United Kingdom	The cutter yacht was run into by the steamship Carisbrooke (United Kingdom) and sank at Cowes, Isle of Wight. She was refloated and anchored in the River Medina in a severely damaged condition.
Sea Queen	United Kingdom	The ship arrived at Calingapatnam, India on fire. The fire was extinguished.
Tai Lee	Germany	The schooner was lost before 10 July.
Yorkshire	United Kingdom	The full-rigged ship was wrecked on Cape Sable Island, Nova Scotia, Canada. At least some of her crew survived. She was on a voyage from Barbados to Montreal, Quebec, Canada.
