= HNLMS Cerberus (1869) =

1869 warship of the Netherlands

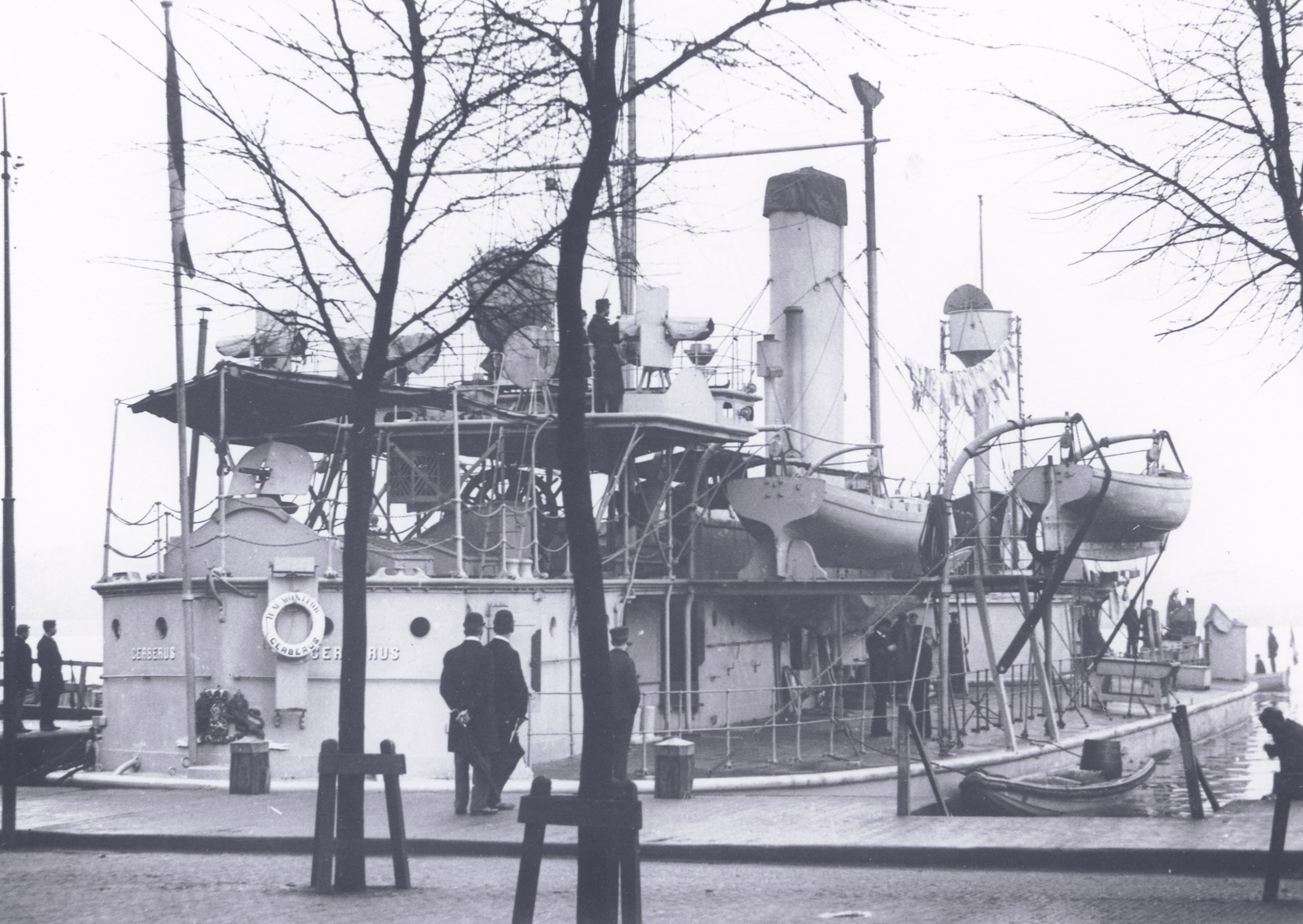
- Stern view of the Cerberus

History

Netherlands
- Name: Cerberus
- Namesake: Cerberus
- Ordered: 1867
- Builder: Rijkswerf (Amsterdam)
- Laid down: 30 November 1867
- Launched: 14 January 1869
- Commissioned: 21 July 1870
- Fate: Sold 1906 and broken up

General characteristics (as completed)
- Class & type: Heiligerlee-class monitor
- Displacement: 1,555–1,585 long tons (1,580–1,610 t)
- Length: 192.25–195.4 ft (58.6–59.6 m) (o/a)
- Beam: 44 ft (13.4 m)
- Draft: 9 ft 9 in (3.0 m)
- Installed power: 560–740 ihp (420–550 kW)
- Speed: 7–8 knots (13–15 km/h; 8.1–9.2 mph)
- Complement: 117
- Armament: 1 × twin 23 cm Armstrong RML, later; 1 x single 28 cm A No. 1 breechloader
- Armour: Belt: 5.5 in (140 mm); Gun turrets: 8–11 in (203–279 mm)

HNLMS Cerberus, was a Heiligerlee-class monitor built in Amsterdam for the Royal Netherlands Navy in the 1860s. Cerberus was a true monitor: a ship with shallow draught, only a few (heavy) guns and decent armor. These characteristics made her very suitable to operate way inland in the Dutch delta.

== The first ironclad built in the Netherlands ==
Cerberus was laid down at the Rijkswerf on 30 November 1867. This was shortly before the Ram Turret Guinea was laid down. It made Cerberus the first purpose-built ironclad that was laid down in the Netherlands. The machinery and boilers for Cerberus were made by the Nederlandsche Stoombootmaatschappij in Feyenoord (Rotterdam).

Construction suffered from the relative backwardness of the Dutch shipbuilding industry. The relatively long construction time was consistent with this. On 14 January 1869 Cerberus was finally launched. In mid-July 1870 Cerberus was tested on the IJ (Amsterdam). The reviews were very positive, but with the industrial interests involved they should not be taken too seriously.

=== Hastily put into service ===
Right after the sea trials Cerberus was taken into service on 21 July 1870. This was during the tensions caused by the Franco-Prussian War, that could easily spill over into the Netherlands. The first captain of Cerberus was Lieutenant 1st class H.A. Ridder van Rappard. Up till then, Van Rappard had been commander of the Heiligerlee. This appointment probably had to do with a desire to make Cerberus effective as soon as possible. Near the end of the season, Cerberus was decommissioned on 31 October 1870. After sailing for only one season, Cerberus would be 'in preservation' for 10 years in Willemsoord.

== Construction Faults ==
Generic criticism about the ships of the navy was quite common in the Netherlands. The criticism about Cerberus was more specific and rather serious: All armored ships built abroad were said to have been carefully and well constructed. To the contrary Cerberus was said not to suffice at all: Not one of the tower's armor plates fitted well, and in many places, 2–3 cm of cement had been applied to stop the gaps. The tower rotated only with much effort, while on the foreign ships this went very well. The openings to load coal were made in the same place as on the Heiligerlee, but on Cerberus the higher boilers were under these openings, instead of the coal bunkers. The ship was furthermore rather leaky. In contrast to such rather blunt statements in the Dutch East Indies press, a Dutch newspaper limited itself to noting that the fault in Cerberus had been repaired. Still later there was another not very specific message about 'Cerberus and its many faults'. By noting that 'the art of armoring had to be learned' it kind of confirmed the notes about its armor. An engineer downplayed the defects of all the monitors, but noted that one could not expect a shipyard that was used to work in wood to deliver the 'same neatness in ironwork' as a company that had 25 years of experience.

== Cerberus in service again 1880 ==
=== Back into service after 10 years ===
In 1880 Cerberus was commissioned again in Willemsoord. On board, the conscripts stationed nearby would exercise the handling of heavy artillery. In early November 1880 Cerberus was under the command of Lieutenant 1st class D.G. Brand. From Nieuwediep she was towed to the Rijkswerf, where she arrived on 6 November. On 16 May 1881 Cerberus went back to Willemsoord, again she was towed. Her commander was Lieutenant von Schmidt auf Altenstadt, and in Willemsoord she would be manned with conscripts, who would be trained in naval affairs. In November von Schmidt auf Altenstadt and a (new?) crew were on board the Ram Turret Guinea. On 2 November the Guinea left the Rijkswerf to be towed to Nieuwediep along the Noordhollandsch Kanaal. There this crew would transfer to Cerberus, and bring her back to the Rijkswerf.

=== Cerberus is modernized 1882-1884 ===
In 1882 Cerberus was mentioned in the naval budget as destined for the defense of the Zuiderzee together with Draak, Matador, Wesp and Bloedhond. Also in 1882, the Rijkswerf started to modernize Cerberus. The two muzzle-loaders were replaced by one 28 cm/L22 Krupp gun, the 28 cm A No. 1. The iron turret armor was replaced by compound armor, and the boilers were replaced. The compound armor for Cerberus was delivered by Cammell & Co in Sheffield.

Even while the ship was 10 years old, the decision to renew the tower and replace the boilers of Cerberus was peculiar, because they had only been used for one season.

=== Part of a squadron 1885 ===
On 26 June 1885 Cerberus would be put into service again at Amsterdam under Lieutenant P.G. Bruch. She would be part of a squadron together with Stier and Buffel and the gunboats Ulfr, Hefring, Bulgia and Das. In July and August Cerberus made some trips on the Zuiderzee. In mid-August, she finally arrived in Nieuwediep to be part of the squadron. In the second week of September, she took part in the planned joint exercises with the army near Den Helder. While entering Nieuwediep again on 27 August, she hit the frigate Evertsen, with both suffering some damage On 24 October Cerberus would be decommissioned again, and therefore she left Nieuwediep on 18 October.

== In service for a prolonged period 1889-1894 ==
=== In service again 1889 ===
In January 1889 the naval department ordered electrical lighting for Cerberus at the company Smit & Co in Slikkerveer. Cerberus was to be put into service again on 21 June 1889 under Captain-lt H.J. de Wal Cerberus would be part of a squadron under Captain Mac Leod, consisting of Buffel, Stier, Matador, Cerberus, and 4 gunboats. In late June Cerberus steamed to the Zuiderzee with the gunboats Bulgia and Geep. They sailed to Hoorn. After staying there for some days, they left for Willemsoord. In mid July the designed squadron was formed, and on 20 August it left Nieuwediep. The operation was delayed because Cerberus got a rope in its keel. After the exercises ended on 1 November something new happened with Cerberus. It had been decided that it would go back to Amsterdam, but would stay in service during the winter.

=== Exercises 1890 ===
While Cerberus was in Amsterdam Captain-Lt de Wal became harbor-master of Den Helder on 1 January 1890. That same day he was replaced by Captain-lt J.R. Eck as commander of the Cerberus. The main plan for 1890 was that Cerberus would join the big exercises near Willemstad. In early April Cerberus left the dock in order to be inspected. On 17 April Cerberus was at anchor before Harlingen. On 21 April she was at Terschelling, from whence she left for Nieuwediep on 24 April, and arrived there the same day. After some shooting exercises near Texel Cerberus left Nieuwediep for the Zuiderzee on 6 May. It went to Amsterdam, from whence she left for the Zuiderzee on 28 May. On 6 June she was in Amsterdam. On 17 June she left Amsterdam again.

In late June 1890 Cerberus, Bloedhond and Panter and 5 gunboats left Amsterdam for the Zuiderzee. They went to Nieuwediep. While there, they were joined by the Ram Turret Stier, and on 5 August they left for the Zuiderzee. On 24 August the exercises on the Zuiderzee ended, and Cerberus returned to Amsterdam. On 11 September Cerberus arrived in Nieuwediep. On 8 October Cerberus was in the Oosterdok in Amsterdam. In October it became known that Cerberus would be kept in service for yet another season in Amsterdam. In mid-December Cerberus was tasked with helping to keep the North Sea Canal ice-free. This might have been a good idea, but the monitor's bow was too blunt to break the ice. The final rather sad result was that the warship hindered the commercial traffic.

=== Exercises in the South 1891 ===
On 29 March 1891 Cerberus was inspected by vice-admiral W.F.H. Cramer. On 1 April she left for Willemsoord. After arriving there on the 3rd, she was inspected in the dry dock. On 15 April she left Willemsoord for the Zuiderzee. It had been ordered that by 1 May 1891 J.R. Eck would become commander of the 'Wachtship' in Amsterdam. He would be succeeded on Cerberus by A.G. Ellis Cerberus sailed back to Amsterdam, and to all appearances, this change of command took place in Amsterdam near 1 May. On 4 May it left Amsterdam under its new commander to exercise on the Zuiderzee. At the end of May 1891, it returned to Amsterdam in order to resupply. On 4 June Cerberus arrived in Nieuwediep. On 16 June Cerberus arrived in Terschelling, from whence it left for Nieuwediep on the 18th. On 23 June she left Nieuwediep for exercises on the Zuiderzee. In late June Cerberus and Panter arrived in Amsterdam, where they would be part of the squadron welcoming the German emperor in Amsterdam.

In July 1891 a squadron was formed, consisting of Guinea and Buffel, the monitors Draak, Panter and Cerberus, the gunboats Heimdal, Balder, Bulgia, Hydra and Idjen, and some torpedo boats. Under the command of the captain of Guinea, it would exercise in the south. On 14 July the ram turrets, monitors and torpedo boat Idjen arrived in Hellevoetsluis from IJmuiden. On 18 July Heimdal, Balder and Braga arrived in Hellevoetsluis from IJmuiden. The other torpedo boats returned to Willemstad. On 31 July the Buffel, Panter, Cerberus, Heimdall, Braga and Balder arrived in Schiedam. They were to exchange their conscripts, and to return to Hellevoetsluis immediately. On 15 August Cerberus arrived in Rotterdam together with the Draak, and three smaller ships. On 2 September 1891 the large naval and army exercises near the entrance to the Haringvliet started. During the exercise Cerberus got stuck and was therefore presumed to have been deleted by a torpedo attack, a rather likely consequence of getting stuck. After the exercise had ended, Cerberus left for the north on 1 October.

On 3 October 1891 Cerberus arrived in IJmuiden. She continued to Amsterdam, but after docking in Amsterdam she left for Willemsoord. On 13 October she arrived in Nieuwediep. On 15 October she left Nieuwediep for the Zuiderzee. She was destined to reach Stavoren on 18 October. On 21 October she was back in Nieuwediep. On 31 October she reached Amsterdam by way of the Noordhollandsch Kanaal. While in Amsterdam Cerberus would get new boilers made by 'De Schelde' in Flushing. By 1 January 1892 Commander Ellis would be replaced by Captain-Lt C. Hoffman.

=== Modernized again ===
On 1 January Captain-lt C. Hoffman indeed took command of Cerberus while it was in the Oosterdok in Amsterdam. In early April she left Amsterdam for the Zuiderzee, and on 14 April she returned. Meanwhile, the secretary for the navy announced again that she would get new boilers. On 19 April she left Amsterdam for Nieuwediep in order to visit the dry dock there. She arrived on the 20th, and after nothing serious was found she left again for the Zuiderzee on 27 April. On 13 May she arrived in Harlingen, from whence she left on 16 May. On 18 May she arrived in Nieuwediep, from whence she left for the Zuiderzee on 23 May. On 28 May she returned to Amsterdam after 'exercises near the Frisian Isles'. On 13 June Cerberus arrived in Terschelling.

On 13 June Cerberus arrived in Amsterdam to be laid up On 14 June she was decommissioned and the Tijger put into service, with Hoffman becoming the commander of the latter. In the end the NSBM in Rotterdam got the order to repair the steam engines and to replace the boilers of Cerberus. Therefore Cerberus would be brought to Rotterdam. On 5 October Cerberus left IJmuiden for Rotterdam in company of the tugboat Zuid-Holland. In March 1893 Cerberus got an electrical night-signal machine type Conz. On 5 May Cerberus and the accompanying tugboat Zuid-Holland arrived back in IJmuiden from Rotterdam. On 6 May she arrived in Amsterdam.

=== Engine damage near Urk ===
On 10 June Cerberus was put into service again under Captain-lt W.A. Buitendijk. Four days later she was inspected by VA Mac Leod. On 16 June Cerberus left Amsterdam for the Zuiderzee. She suffered major engine damage near Urk on 23 June. She managed to return to Amsterdam after temporary repairs, but had to be towed into the harbor by two tugboats. By 2 July she was repaired, and on 12 July she left Amsterdam again for the Zuiderzee. On 1 August she arrived in Willemsoord to enter the dry dock. After that a busy schedule of voyages followed. On 3 August she anchored before Vlieland. On 6 August Cerberus left Harlingen. On 21 August she was back in Amsterdam. On 18 September she left Harlingen again. On 19 September she arrived in Nieuwediep. On 25 September she left again, and on the 26th she arrived in Terschelling. On 13 October she arrived in Nieuwediep, and left again on the 16th. On 1 November 1893 Cerberus was decommissioned in Amsterdam

=== More trips 1894 ===
In early April 1894 Cerberus entered the dry dock in Amsterdam. She was to be put into service again on 9 June under Captain-Lt G.A. van der Mieden. On 14 June she was inspected by VA Mac-Leod. She arrived in Terschelling on 25 June, and then sailed to Vlieland, from whence she left on 26 June. On 12 July Cerberus got stuck near Pampus, and on 15 July this was still the case. On 25 July she arrived in Vlieland. The next day she arrived in Nieuwediep. By 21 August Van der Mieden would be replaced by Captain-Lt by P. Heyning. On 30 July the Cerberus left Nieuwediep, and the next day she passed Vlieland, and sailed to Harlingen. A few days later she arrived in Hoorn. Near 10 August she was loading coal in Hembrug.

== Bibliography ==
- Campbell, N. J. M. (1979). "The Netherlands". In Gardiner, Robert (ed.). Conway's All the World's Fighting Ships 1860–1905. Greenwich: Conway Maritime Press. pp. 371–377. ISBN 978-0-8317-0302-8.
