= HNLMS Matador =

Dutch warship built in the 1870s

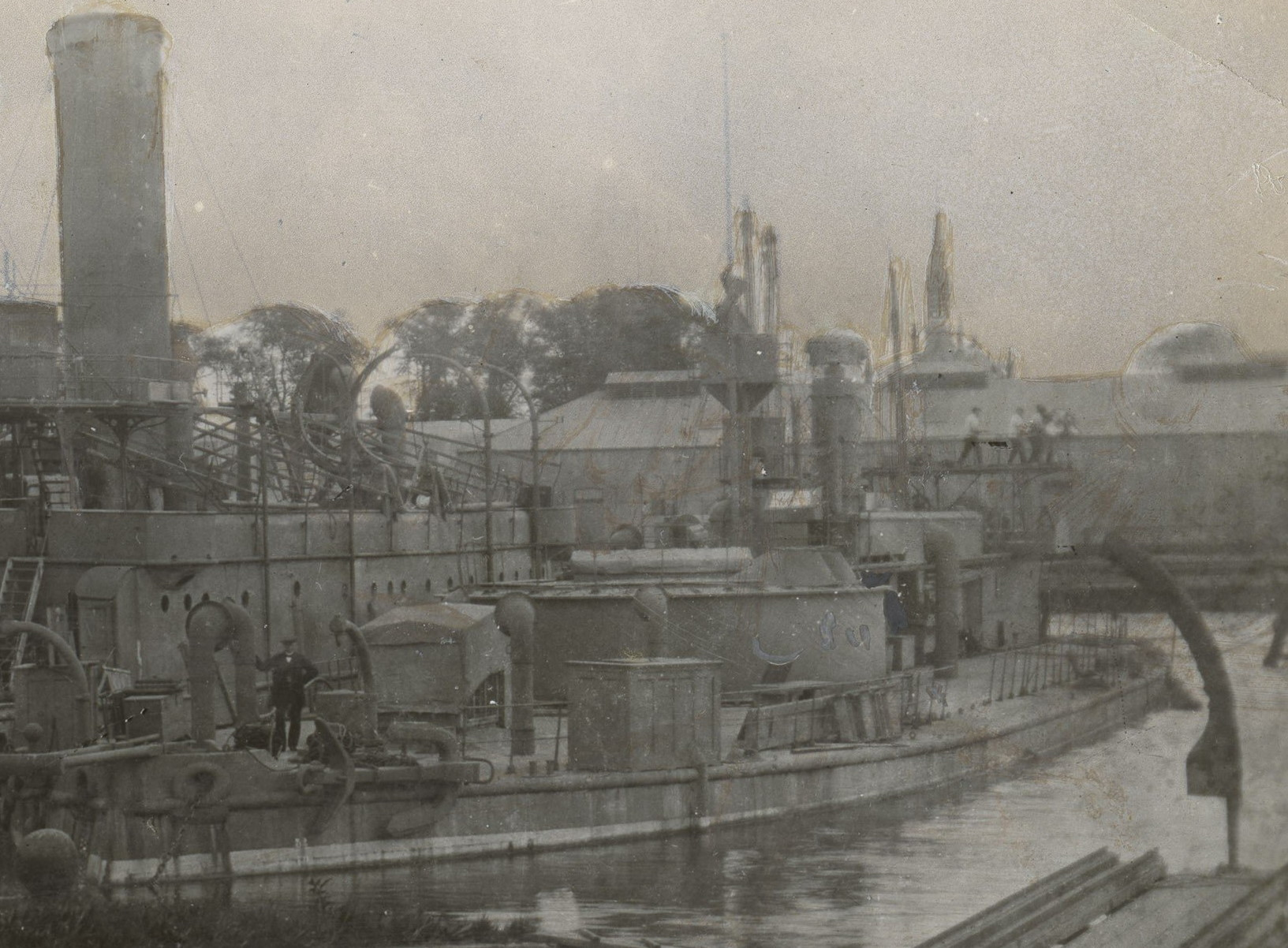
- Matador in Hellevoetsluis

History

Netherlands
- Name: Matador
- Namesake: Bullfighter
- Builder: Fijenoord, Rotterdam
- Laid down: 19 January 1877
- Launched: 16 March 1878
- Fate: Sold to be broken 26 June 1914

General characteristics
- Type: Ram Monitor
- Displacement: 1,935 metric tons (1,904 long tons)
- Length: 61.10 m (p/p)
- Beam: 14.42 m
- Draught: 2.90 m (114.2 in)
- Depth of hold: 3.40 m
- Installed power: 140 hp (100 kW); 680 ihp (510 kW)
- Speed: 8 knots (15 km/h; 9.2 mph)
- Complement: 113
- Armament: 2 × 28 cm A No. 1
- Armour: Belt: 140 mm (6 in); Gun turrets: 229–305 mm (9–12 in)

HNLMS Matador was a monitor (Dutch: rammonitor 1e klasse) built in the late 1870s.

== Design and description ==
=== Types of monitors ===
By the early 1870s the Dutch navy had 10 monitors. The first 5 were the deckhouse monitors of the Heiligerlee class. Next came 5 ram monitors. These did not have any deckhouses, but were then found to be somewhat less practical and less seaworthy. A few years later, the next type of monitor was planned. It would have a deckhouse aft, but no obstacles in front of the gun tower. The first of this third type of monitor would be HNLMS Luipaard. It was planned to have the same twin 23 cm rifled muzzle loaders, that the other monitors had.

=== Dimensions ===
During the construction of Luipaard, some further insights led the Dutch navy to abandon the 23 cm RML, and so Luipaard would get the new Krupp 28 cm A No. 1 breechloader. However, the weight of one of these Krupp guns was double that of the 23 cm RML, and it was considerably longer. By then it was too late to change the overall dimensions of the ship, and so Luipaard got only one 28 cm gun.

The next monitors which were planned would therefore be built according to a new design, which would allow mounting of two 28 cm guns. The first of these was HNLMS Draak. Matador came next. With a displacement of 2,156t for Draak and 1,935t for Matador, these monitors were about 33% bigger than the monitors of the preceding classes. Matador would get a somewhat shallower draught than Draak.

=== Propulsion ===
The machinery for Matador was the same as that of HNLMS Tijger.

=== Armament ===
The main armament of Matador consisted of two 28 cm A No. 1 breech-loaders made by Krupp.

=== Armor ===
The armor of Matador was much like that of Luipaard. The 140 mm belt was also the same as that of the first 10 monitors. The tower of Matador differed by having 229–305 mm armor. (Draak would also get a heavier belt)

== Service ==
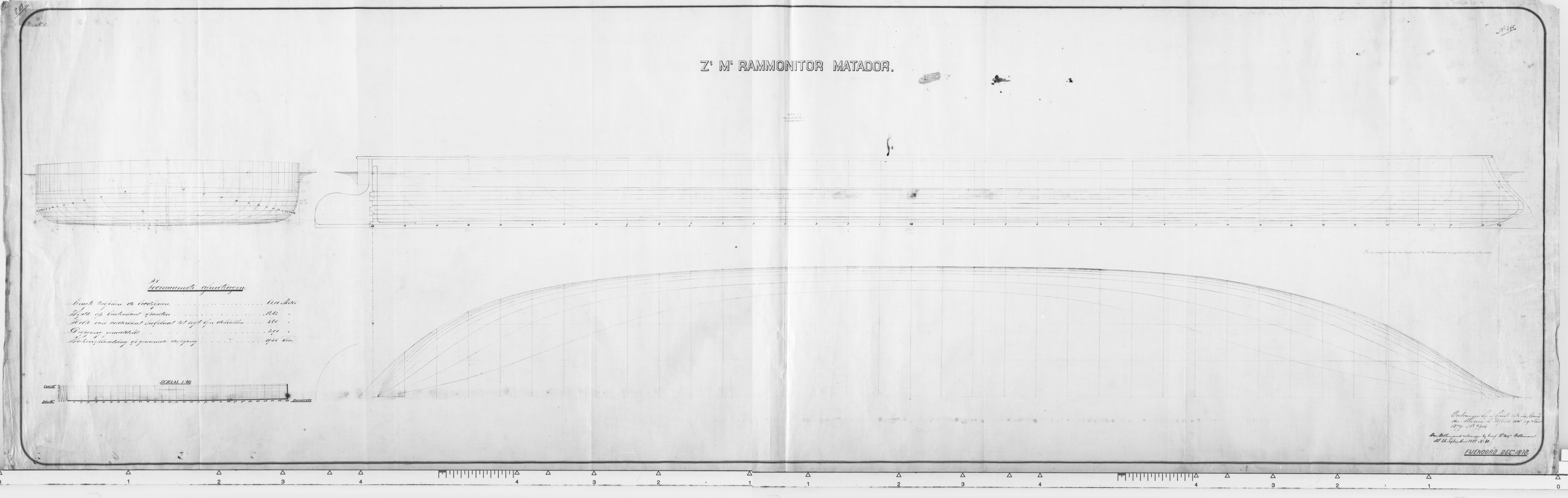
Design drawing of Dutch monitor Matador (1877-1914).

=== Construction and launch ===
Matador was laid down on 19 January 1877. At that time it was already known that she would carry twin 28 breechloaders. She was launched on 16 March 1878. At that moment she weighed only 800 tonnes of the 1,930 tons she would displace. Next she was in conservation at the shipyard for some time. Matador arrived in Hellevoetsluis on 24 April 1879. She was to hold make her trials on the Haringvliet, and then to return to Fijenoord for the last work.

=== A precursor of the Adder disaster ===
In August 1879 Matador was to sail from Rotterdam to Willemsoord via the Nieuwe Waterweg. Her commander was Lieutenant 1st class M.J.C. Lucardie. On 7 August 1879 Matador anchored at Maassluis. On 9 August she left Maassluis, and entered the North Sea en route to Willemsoord in very foul weather. When she failed to arrive in time, Stier was sent to investigate, because 'she was not meant for the high sea'. When Stier found her, the worst of the weather was already over. Both arrived in Willemsoord at 7:30 PM. Later a story surfaced, that while Stier found Matador, she was so out of control that Stier had to remain at a distance. It was said that if something had happened, only some people on the bridge might have been saved, because nobody could stand on the deck without getting washed over.

=== In Ordinary (1879-1885) ===
In Willemsoord Matador was taken in ordinary. In 1880 she got a wooden central keel and a steam powered rudder. On 26 August 1880 she then made a short trip to test these. In late 1882 the navy mentioned Matador as being designated for the defense of the Zuiderzee. Other ships with this task were: Draak, Wesp, Cerberus and Bloedhond. In practice this meant that Matador remained in ordinary. This was obviously part of a broader policy to first use up the older ships and guns. It drew criticism because it meant that sailors were trained in the use of the 23 cm RML, which was obsolete, instead of practicing with the 28 cm breechloader of Draak, Matador, Luipaard and two Wodan-class gunboats.

In September 1884 Matador was planned to be towed to Hellevoetsluis by tugboat Hercules. Captain-lt I.F.M. Lange would be in command, and the voyage would take place in good weather. On 18 September the convoy left Nieuwediep to the sound of the national anthem. Both then returned to the roadstead the same day, because of dense fog. The next day the convoy left again, and passed IJmuiden. In the early morning of 20 September the convoy arrived in Hellevoetsluis. In Hellevoetsluis Matador was again 'taken in conservation'.

=== Commissioned (1885) ===
In 1885 Matador would finally be commissioned for regular service. On 26 June she would be commissioned under commander Lieutenant 1st class H. Schotborgh. In early July Matador left Hellevoetsluis together with Buffel to exercise. These first exercises were probably only small trips that took place only on the Haringvliet, because they returned quickly. In mid July they left again, and again returned quickly. When Buffel had to undergo some repairs, Matador then exercised alone. In mid-August Matador and Buffel again returned to Hellevoetsluis.

In late August 1885 there were some longer and larger scale exercises near Hellevoetsluis. These represented an attack on the island Voorne, where Hellevoetsluis is located. Buffel was among the attackers, and Matador represented the defenders. The exercises went on into the night and involved aspects like landings and coastal artillery. Some recent developments like torpedo boats and searchlights were also present. After some smaller exercises Matador was then decommissioned on 24 October. One of the last activities was firing 6 shots from the main guns with the heaviest charge. The idea was to test the effects on the ship.

=== In Ordinary (1886) ===
Incredibly, Matador was then again in ordinary in 1886. In 1888 she would be commissioned again, but in the end her only activity was a test of the anchor winch and electrical light.

=== Commissioned (1889-1890) ===
On 21 June 1889 Matador was commissioned again under Captain-lt A. van Hengel. On 25 June Matador then left Hellevoetsluis for practice on the Haringvliet. On 2 July Van Hengel was replaced by Captain-Lt F.J. Beckman. On 8 July Matador and Buffel were to leave Hellevoetsluis for the North Sea and Nieuwediep, if the weather permitted. On 9 July they arrived there. Next came large scale exercises centering on the fortress of Den Helder, lasting from 16 to 30 August. After these exercises Matador remained in commission, and was back in Hellevoetsluis by early October. In early November other exercises were finished, and Matador took her place in the Koopvaardijhaven. On 28 November she then left for Dordrecht, where she arrived the same day. On 1 February 1890 Matador arrived in Rotterdam. By 28 March 1890 she had arrived in Hellevoetsluis from Rotterdam. Next came the usual exercises. On 16 April 1690 Captain-Lt J.A. Vening replaced Beckman. On 1 July 1890 Matador was decommissioned again. In July 1891 Matador was in Hellevoetsluis Dry Dock.

=== Commissioned (1893-1897) ===
On 1 April 1893 Matador was commissioned under Captain-Lt Z.J. Cambier. In the first half of 1893 she only made a trip to Dordrecht and back again via Rotterdam. Later, she did some gunnery exercises, and visited Terneuzen and Zierikzee. On 1 November 1893 Captain-Lt J. Van Scheers became the next commander. By 1 December she would again stay in Dordrecht, and in February 1894 in Rotterdam, where she would lie at the Parkkade. In mid March she returned to Hellevoetsluis. Next came the usual exercises on the Haringvliet and a trip to Dordrecht. From there she again returned to Dordrecht via the Nieuwe Waterweg. In August she sailed to IJmuiden and Nieuwediep. In September 1894 she returned to Hellevoetsluis via the Nieuwe Waterweg and Dordrecht. In late September 1894 there was a Cholera outbreak on board, with at least one fatality. In October 1894 Matador was to steam to Dordrecht, but instead she entered the dry dock in Hellevoetsluis for important repairs.

On 6 April 1895 Captain-Lt J. Cardinaal became the next commander of Matador. By then she was said to have been in repair for a long time. These repairs probably entailed the replacement of the pipes of the boilers, which was done between October 1894 and October 1895. On 29 May Matador left Brouwershaven for Wemeldinge. On 19 June she was in Maassluis. On 24 June 1895 she left Rotterdam to sail to Hellevoetsluis via the North Sea, but when she the sea to be too rough, she turned about and took her rout via Dordrecht.

On 16 January 1896 Commander Cardinaal was replaced by Captain-Lt A. Seret. In April she went from Maassluis to Amsterdam. Matador then wanted to steam the Noordhollandsch Kanaal to Nieuwediep. In Purmerend she entered the lock, but it soon proved that with the Matador in the lock chamber, the lock doors could not be closed. So Matador had to get out of the lock again. The captain then wanted to turn her about, but in the canal, this also proved impossible. She finally had to steam backwards with the help of a tugboat. Matador next went to Nieuwediep via the Zuiderzee. Here there were many exercises on the Zuiderzee. After these were over, Matador left Nieuwediep for Hellevoetsluis via Dordrecht on 9 July.

=== In Ordinary (1897-1907) ===
On 2 February 1897 Matador was decommissioned. To all appearances Matador then stayed in Hellevoetsluis for 10 years.

=== Commissioned (1907) ===
On 21 August 1907 the old Matador was commissioned again. Her commander was to be Lieutenant 1st class H.W.A. Brans. In September 1907 she was to go to Rotterdam to check the unrest in the harbor. On the quay Parkkade, a shelter was built for 70 sailors that did not fit on Matador. There were also temporary barracks for the cavalry in the harbor. Matador was then reinforced by Heiligerlee. On 16 October Brans was replaced by Captain-Lt E. de Haan. On 26 November Matador was still in Rotterdam. On 3 December 1907 Matador finally left for Hellevoetsluis.

In mid 1908 Matador was in Dordrecht, when serious labor unrest took place. By then E. de Haan was still in command. On 16 October 1908 E. de Haan was replaced by Captain-Lt M.H.E. Sachse. On 1 December 1908 Matador was then decommissioned, with Sachse taking command of Reinier Claeszen.

=== The final years (1909-1914) ===
When Matador was decommissioned on 1 December 1908, she was 30 years old. The concept of its design was even older. Nevertheless, many Dutch politicians thought that the remaining monitors could still serve a purpose, by re-arming them to stop light enemy ships. Others thought this a waste of money. In September 1912 the Department of the Navy concluded that the last monitors should be broken up. The last monitors would be replaced by the Brinio-class gunboats, known as armored boats. In 1913 these were not yet ready. In April 1914 Reinier Claeszen, Draak and Matador were stricken. On 26 June 1914 she was sold to the ship breakers Scheepssloperij Holland in Hendrik-Ido-Ambacht for 42,046.36 guilders.
