= HNLMS Prins Hendrik der Nederlanden =

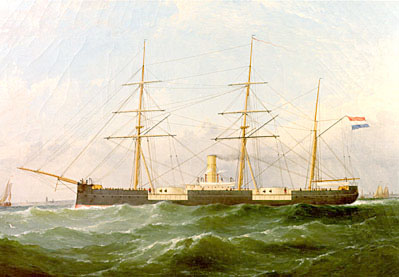
- Painting of Prins Hendrik der Nederlanden with her bulwarks down to show the gun turrets

History

Netherlands
- Name: Prins Hendrik der Nederlanden
- Namesake: Prince Henry of the Netherlands
- Builder: Laird & Sons, Birkenhead
- Laid down: August 1865
- Launched: 9 October 1866
- Completed: March 1867
- Decommissioned: 5 May 1899
- Fate: Scrapped after 1905

General characteristics
- Type: Ironclad turret ship
- Displacement: 3,375 metric tons (3,322 long tons)
- Length: 230 ft (70.1 m) (p/p)
- Beam: 44 ft (13.4 m)
- Draught: 18 ft 8 in (5.7 m)
- Installed power: 2,426 ihp (1,809 kW)
- Propulsion: 2 shafts, 2 Horizontal return connecting rod compound steam engines; 4 square boilers
- Sail plan: Barque-rigged
- Speed: 12 knots (22 km/h; 14 mph)
- Complement: 230
- Armament: 2 × 2 - 9-inch Armstrong RML; 4 × 1 - 12 cm K.A. breech-loading guns
- Armour: Belt: 4.5 in (114 mm); Gun turrets: 5.5–11 in (140–279 mm); Bulkheads: 4.5 in (114 mm)

HNLMS Prins Hendrik der Nederlanden (Note: "HNLMS" stands for "His Netherlands Majesty's Ship" but the Royal Netherlands Navy uses "Zr. Ms." (Dutch: Zijner Majesteits schip) instead of the international HNLMS.) was an ironclad ramtorenschip (turret ram ship) built in Great Britain for the Royal Netherlands Navy in the mid-1860s. She was transferred to the Dutch East Indies in 1876 and participated in the Dutch intervention in Lombok and Karangasem in 1894. The ship was hulked in 1899 and scrapped in 1925.

== Design and description ==
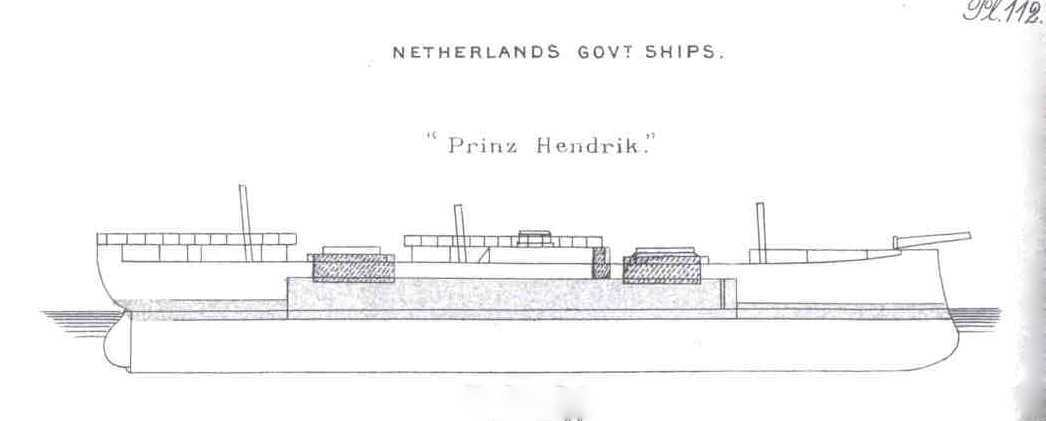
Right elevation drawing, the shaded areas illustrate her armor scheme

HNLMS Prins Hendrik der Nederlanden was ordered from Laird & Son Co. by the Royal Netherlands Navy as an enlarged version of the Scorpion-class ironclad turret ships originally ordered by the Confederate States Navy. The gun turrets was normally rotated by two men via a system of gears; 20 seconds were required for a full 360° rotation if a full crew of 19 men was used. The ship's bow was reinforced to act as a ram and a hurricane deck connected the forecastle and poop decks. For sea passages the ship's freeboard could be increased to 14 feet (4.3 m) by use of hinged bulwarks 5 feet (1.5 m) high.

The ship had a length between perpendiculars of 230 feet (70.1 m), a beam of 44 feet (13.4 m), and a draught of 18 feet 8 inches (5.69 m). She displaced 3,375 tonnes (3,322 long tons). The iron hull was divided by five watertight bulkheads and the ship had a double bottom beneath the engine and boiler rooms. Her crew consisted of 230 officers and men.

=== Propulsion ===
Prins Hendrik der Nederlanden had two horizontal return connecting rod compound steam engines, built by Lairds, each driving a single 15-foot-6-inch (4.7 m) propeller. The engines were powered by four square boilers. The engines produced a total of 2,426 indicated horsepower (1,809 kW) which gave the ship a maximum speed of 12.09 knots (22.39 km/h; 13.91 mph) during her sea trials. She carried 380 long tons (390 t) of coal and was barque-rigged with three masts. Her fore and mainmasts were supported by tripods to reduce interference with the firing arcs of the gun turrets by the ship's rigging. Prins Hendrik der Nederlanden had a total sail area of 1,554 square meters (16,730 sq ft).

=== Armament ===
The ship mounted a pair of Armstrong 9-inch (229 mm) rifled muzzle-loading guns in each gun turret. Each gun weighed 12.5 long tons (12.7 t). Two Krupp produced 12 cm K.A. breech-loading guns were fitted in the forecastle and another pair in the poop as chase guns. Six 37-millimeter (1.5 in) Hotchkiss 5-barrel revolving guns were added shortly after completion. They fired a shell weighing about 1.1 lb (0.50 kg) at a muzzle velocity of about 2,000 ft/s (610 m/s) to a range about 3,500 yards (3,200 m). They had a rate of fire of about 30 rounds per minute

=== Armor ===
Prins Hendrik der Nederlanden had a complete waterline belt of wrought iron that was 4.5 inches (114 mm) thick. Amidships, for a length of 120 feet (36.6 m), the armor belt had a height of 12 feet (3.7 m) of which 3 feet (0.9 m) below the waterline. At the bow and stern the belt was only 2.5 feet (0.8 m) high above the waterline. 4.5-inch transverse bulkheads were provided to protect the bases of the turrets and the machinery spaces from raking fire. Each turret was protected by 5.5-inch (140 mm) armor plates, although the total thickness around the gun ports was 11 inches (279 mm). The deck was unarmored. http://resolver.kb.nl/resolve?urn=sgd:18741875:0001253:pdf

== Service ==
Prins Hendrik der Nederlanden was laid down by Laird & Son Co. at Birkenhead in August 1865. She was launched on 9 October 1866 and completed in March 1867. Before being sent to the Dutch East Indies she was tasked with the defence of the Dutch Navy main harbour at Den Helder. The ship was transferred to the Dutch East Indies in 1876 and served in the Auxiliary squadron.

She was absent from Java from 25 November 1879 until 24 February 1880 for repairs to her boilers that were leaking at Singapore.

In late June 1881 she temporally replaced Zeeland as guard ship at Batavia. On 25 January 1882 she entered Onrust Dock of 5,000 tons at Onrust Island. On 1 February 1882 she was sent to Cirebon but due to the outbreak of cholera the ship was recalled after a few days and send to Riau for practice from which she returned on 20 March that year in Batavia. From 16 to 25 May 1882 she practised at Tanjung Priok and made a visit to the Thousand Islands. In June that year she left for Surabaya where she received new boilers.

After practicing in August 1883 she protect shipping in the Sunda Strait and made a trip to the shores of Banten and Lampung after the eruption of the volcano Krakatoa. 13 November 1883 until 24 January 1884 she served as guard ship at Batavia.

She was fitted with a Spar torpedo system in 1885. In April 1887 she practised in the Java Sea for several days and was later that month sent to Makassar for a three-month practice together with Koning der Nederlanden. Later that year she was repaired at Surabaya and after that again sent to Makassar for practice.

From 24 January 1890 until 2 December 1891 she was attached to the naval force stationed on the north coast of Aceh. In 1893 she was attached to the naval force east of Java and Borneo. This lasted until early August 1896.

The 37-millimeter guns were replaced by two quick-firing, 75-millimeter (3.0 in) guns and four 37-millimeter quick-firers by 1890. Prins Hendrik der Nederlanden transported troops during the Dutch intervention in Lombok and Karangasem in July 1894. She transported the lord of Lombok and his family in late 1894 to Batavia after they were taken prisoner. In August 1897 she participated in an expedition to Segli.

The ship decommissioned on 5 May 1899 and became an ammunition hulk in Surabaya. She was transferred to the Department of Colonies between 1901 and 1905, but returned to the Navy in 1905. Prins Hendrik der Nederlanden was scrapped in 1925.
