= 28 cm A No. 1 gun =

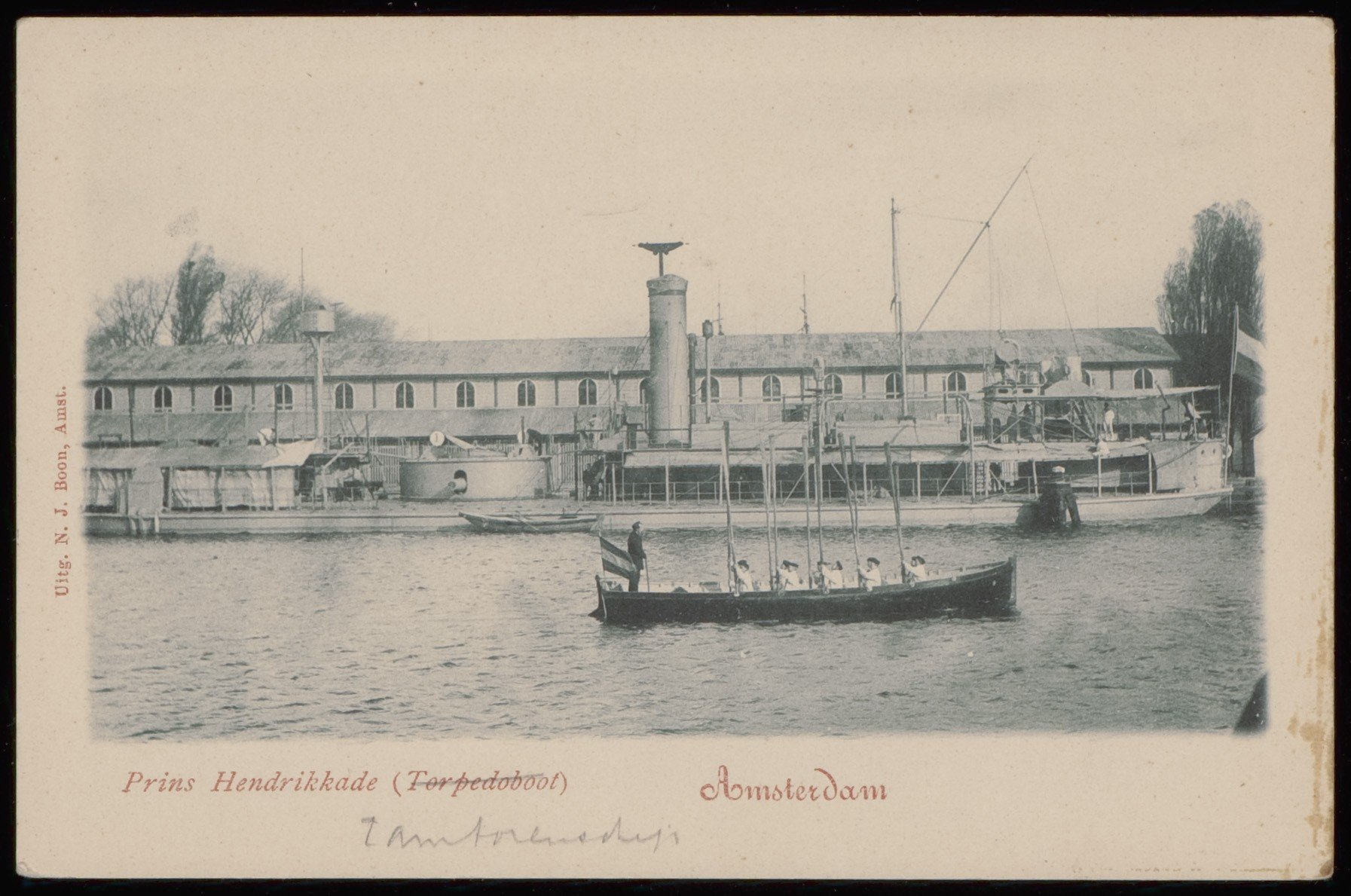
- Heiligerlee class monitor with 28 cm A No. 1 gun
- Type: Naval gun
- Place of origin: Germany

Service history
- In service: 1876 -
- Used by: Netherlands
- Wars: First World War

Production history
- Manufacturer: Krupp

Specifications
- Mass: 27,650 kg (60,960 lb)
- Length: 6.10 metres (20 ft 0 in) (22 caliber)
- Caliber: 279 mm (11.0 in)
- Maximum firing range: 0 m (0 yd)

The Dutch naval gun 28 cm A No. 1, or 28 cm L/22, was the first of a few 28 cm Breechloader Krupp guns used by the Dutch navy. The 'A' stands for Achterlader, the Dutch word for Breechloader.

== Context ==
From the mid 1860s to the early 1870s the Dutch navy rushed to complete an armored fleet for coastal defense. It followed the British Royal Navy in equipping this fleet with Rifled Muzzle loading guns, especially the 23 cm RML 9-inch Armstrong Gun. When the Royal Navy finally judged that breechloader guns were superior, the Dutch followed suit.

This time they chose a Krupp gun, introduced in 1876. The reason might have been as simple as the Krupp gun and carriage costing 67,500 guilders, while the Armstrong gun and carriage cost 75,000 guilders.

== Usage ==
The first 28 cm breechloading gun used by the Dutch navy was described by Tideman as being the single gun mounted on HNLMS Luipaard, followed by the double tower of HNLMS Draak (two guns). The later monitor HNLMS Matador would also get two 28 cm guns. Later, a rearmament program was started to replace the double 23 cm Armstrong RML's on the Ram Ironclads, Ram Monitors and Monitors. In July 1877 four 28 cm Krupp breechloaders arrived in Amsterdam by train. From the Nieuw Vaart these were brought to the Rijkswerf Amsterdam by boat. The guns were 6.1 m long and weighed about 27,500 kg. They were meant to arm the monitors first class, and the steam-powered gunboats. In October 1877 '10 more guns' arrived in Amsterdam from Essen on special rail carriages.

HNLMS Stier and HNLMS Cerberus were two of the first ships that got their double 23 cm Armstrong RML's replaced with single 28 cm No. 1's. On the occasion it was noted that 1 28 cm No. 1 with carriage weighed 32,300 kg, or 1,785 more than two 23 cm RML's with carriages. Indeed the gun weight of 27,650 kg and the 4,650 kg carriage for 28 cm No. 1 add up to 32,300, which confirms that the 28 cm No. 1 was the gun used on Stier and Cerberus. By 1 July 1889 the 28 cm No. 1 had replaced the 23 cm Amrstrong RML on all ram ironclads, ram monitors, and regular monitors.

Of the ram ironclads, Stier was first to get the gun. Schorpioen got the 28 cm gun during a refit in 1886. In 1888 Buffel got the 28 cm No. 1. Guinea probably got the gun in 1889. In 1894 a young lieutenant was standing next to the 28 cm gun on Guinea, when it suddenly fired. The blast shattered his eardrums, and he was subsequently retired.

Of the Adder class ram monitors, Luipaard had the 28 cm gun from the start. HNLMS Adder sank before she could be rearmed. By 1887 Wesp also had the 28 cm gun. By 1 July 1888, Haai was the last monitor that still had the 23 cm Armstrong muzzle loaders.

Of the Heiligerlee class monitors Cerberus and Bloedhond had the 28 cm gun by January 1884. By August 1887 HNLMS Krokodil and HNLMS Heiligerlee also had the 28 cm No. 1.

== Characteristics ==
=== Gun Weight ===
The weight given by Tideman for the first 28 cm (11 in) guns was 27,650 kg (60,960 lb).

=== Carriage ===
For this type of the guns, the carriage was not for moving the gun around. Instead it was used to mount the gun on the ship, and to receive the recoil. Here, a 'sliding' carriage (schuifaffuit) means that it moved forwards and backwards with the recoil. The Dutch had multiple carriages for the 28 cm breechloader. There was a sliding carriage of 4,650 kg (10,250 lb), and a special sliding carriage of 4,700 kg (10,400 lb) for the gunboats.

The part below the carriage was called sled (slede). For some lighter guns there were turntable sleds (draaislede), which could be used to aim the gun to the left or right. For the 28 cm breechloader there was a tower sled of 10,350 kg (22,820 lb). For use on the gunboats there was a fixed sled of 5,800 kg (12,800 lb).

=== The Grenade ===
The 28 cm No. 1 basically fired two grenades. The normal grenade of 216 kg (476 lb), and the armor piercing grenade of 254 kg (560 lb). The grenades had a diameter of 278 mm and were 784 mm long. Maximum charge was 55 kg of brown powder.

=== Effectiveness ===
The gun was claimed to be strong enough to penetrate the armor of stronger opponents in normal fighting circumstances. Example opponents were the German ironclads of the Preussen class and Kaiser class, as well as the British ironclads Hercules and Glatton.
