= HNLMS Tijger =

Heiligerlee-class monitor of the Royal Netherlands Navy

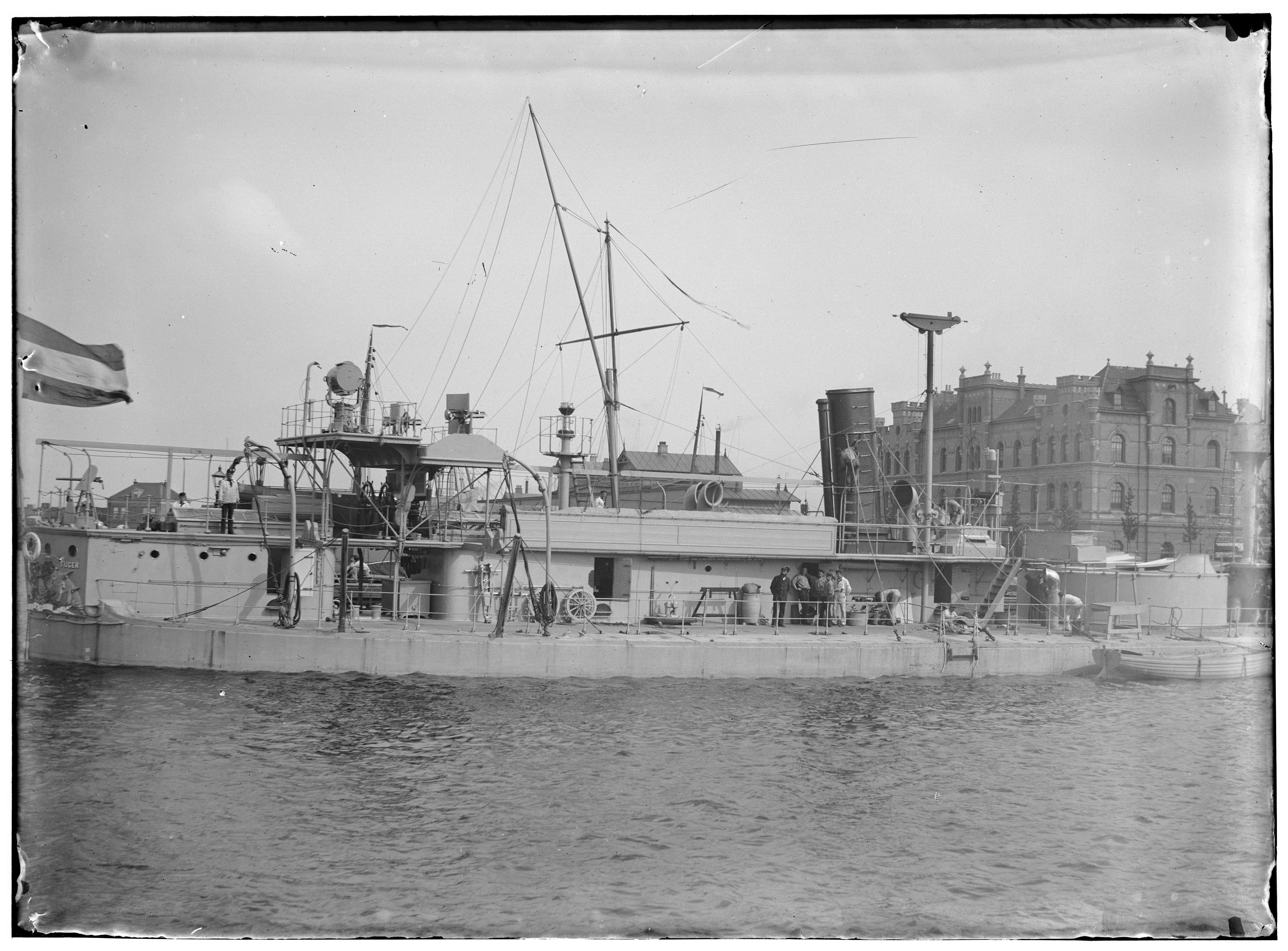
- Tijger

HMNLS Tijger was a Heiligerlee-class monitor built in England for the Royal Netherlands Navy in the 1860s.

== Bibliography ==
- Campbell, N. J. M. (1979). "The Netherlands". In Gardiner, Robert (ed.). Conway's All the World's Fighting Ships 1860–1905. Greenwich: Conway Maritime Press. pp. 371–377. ISBN 978-0-8317-0302-8.
