= HNLMS Heiligerlee =

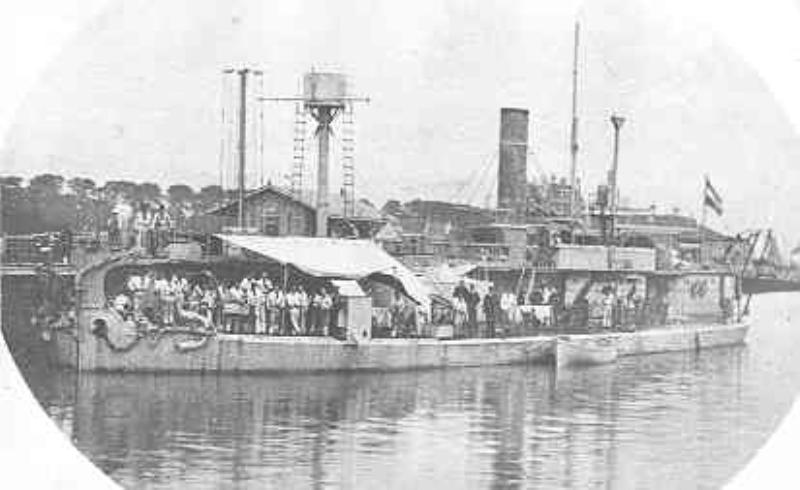
- Heiligerlee c. 1870

History

Netherlands
- Name: Heiligerlee
- Namesake: Battle of Heiligerlee
- Ordered: 1867
- Builder: Laird Brs., Birkenhead England
- Laid down: August 1867
- Launched: 14 January 1868
- Commissioned: 26 May 1868
- Fate: Sold, 21 April 1910

General characteristics (as completed)
- Class & type: Heiligerlee-class monitor
- Displacement: 1,530 long tons (1,550 t)
- Length: 54.80 m (179.8 ft) (o/a)
- Beam: 13.33 m (43.7 ft)
- Draft: 2.95 m (9.7 ft)
- Installed power: 630 ihp (470 kW)
- Speed: 7–8 knots (13–15 km/h; 8.1–9.2 mph)
- Complement: 117
- Armament: 1 × twin 9-inch (229 mm) muzzle-loading rifle, replaced by: 1 x single 28 cm A No. 1 breechloader
- Armour: Belt: 5.5 in (140 mm); Gun turrets: 8–11 in (203–279 mm)

HNLMS Heiligerlee, formerly known as Panter, was a Heiligerlee-class monitor built in England for the Royal Netherlands Navy in the 1860s. Among the new ships built for the Dutch navy Heiligerlee was the first true monitor: a ship with shallow draught, only a few (heavy) guns and decent armor. These characteristics made her very suitable to operate way inland in the Dutch delta.

== Construction and handover ==
Heiligerlee was originally named Panter. She was ordered from Laird Brothers in May 1867, and was to be delivered in 9 months. On 14 January 1868 Panter was launched. On account of the 300th anniversary of the Battle of Heiligerlee she was renamed for the 1568 Battle of Heiligerlee. This renaming was published on 23 May, the actual anniversary of the battle.

On 20 May 1868 Paddle steamer HNLMS Valk commanded by Captain-lt J.F. Koopman had already left the Netherlands to transport the prospective crew of Heiligerlee to Birkenhead, where Heiligerlee would be taken into service. In the evening of 24 May the Valk arrived in Liverpool. Heiligerlee was taken into service on 26 May 1868, when the yard handed over control to Lieutenant 1st class H.A. Ridder van Rappard.

By 10 June 1868 the English press mentioned that Heiligerlee had completed her trial cruise. During this cruise she had on board her guns and ammunition, 75 officers and men, their luggage, six weeks of stores and 5 days of coal. Her quarters were described as very spacious and well ventilated. In the afternoon of the 10th Heiligerlee left Birkenhead for the Netherlands.

== Service record: 1st Term 1868–1877 ==
=== Initial voyages in the Netherlands ===
In the early afternoon of the 15 June 1868 Heiligerlee arrived in the Nieuwe Diep near Den Helder. On 5 July the Secretary for the Navy arrived to see the new ship. With some ceremony he made a short trip on the monitor on the 6th, sailing on the Marsdiep.

On 8 September Admiral Prince Hendrik arrived in Den Helder. He also made a trip to the Marsdiep on Heiligerlee. On 10 September Heiligerlee left Texel to sail to Delfzijl. On the 11th Heiligerlee arrived in the harbor of Delfzijl. While there, the ship was visited by the Secretary for War, the governor of Groningen province, and a lot of local dignitaries and civilians. On 19 September Heiligerlee was back in Den Helder.

=== Heiligerlee is based in the south ===
On 11 October Heiligerlee left the Den Helder dockyard Willemsoord. She steamed along the coast and reached Hellevoetsluis in the morning of the 12th. Some subsequent trips show that the Heilgerlee could indeed penetrate way inland: From Hellevoetsluis she would steam on the 'Kanaal door Voorne' to reach its new base at Rotterdam. On 21 October the royal yacht 'Leeuw' with the Queen and Prince Alexander on board made a small detour to view Heiligerlee while she was stationed across the park on the Meuse. On 27 October Heiligerlee was back in Hellevoetsluis. From there she left for Brouwershaven on the 31st, and returned to Hellevoetsluis on 2 November. On 6 November she left for Dordrecht. From there she left for Rotterdam on the 11th, got stuck for some time and had to be pulled loose by tugboats.

On 16 March 1869 Heiligerlee arrived in Hellevoetsluis from Rotterdam. She would enter Hellevoetsluis Dry Dock to be checked and cleaned. While in Hellevoetsluis, she was inspected together with the Schorpioen on 21 April. On 5 June the Heilgerlee left for Rotterdam. She sailed upstream as far as Gorinchem and left there on 21 June. By sailing to Gorinchem, Heiligerlee demonstrated that monitors could play a role in defending the new Water Line. Heiligerlee next went to Hellevoetsluis and from there to Brouwershaven. In August Heiligerlee and Ram Turret ship Schorpioen exercised on the Haringvliet. Later Heiligerlee steamed to Rotterdam, and from there to Dordrecht, where she got stuck again. In October she went into the dry dock to clean and paint the hull.

=== During the Franco-Prussian War ===
On 30 April 1870 Commander Ridder van Rappard abandoned the command of Heiligerlee, and was replaced by Lieutenant 1st class J.A.E. Dinaux. This might have to do with the navy opting to have a commander experienced with monitors to command the new Cerberus. In effect, the drastic increase in Dutch defense spending was vindicated when the Franco-Prussian war started. It created the severe risk that it would provide one of the parties with a pretext to invade the Netherlands if it could easily do so. To prevent this the garrison of Hellevoetsluis was reinforced and Heiligerlee and Tijger were posted before the harbor.

=== Maneuvers in a squadron ===
In May 1871 Heiligerlee steamed from Rotterdam to Dordrecht and hit one of the bridges over the Meuse. Later she made a trip from Werkendam to Willemsdorp on the Nieuwe Merwede. In August 1871 it sailed to Zierikzee with the Tijger and the Krokodil. On 16 August the same ships left Hellevoetsluis again, and sailed to Vlissingen The Heilgerlee was part of the Squadron under Rear Admiral J.J. Wichers consisting of the Ram Turrets Buffel and Schorpioen, the monitors Heiligerlee, Krokodil and Tijger, and Peddle Steamer Valk. The squadron arrived in Antwerp on 18 August 1871 to repatriate the bodies of soldiers killed in the 1832 Siege of the Citadel of Antwerp. After visiting the Moerdijk the squadron reached Hellevoetsluis, where it was disbanded.

In March 1872 Lieutenant 1st class W.F. Meijen became commander of Heiligerlee. After an uneventful year the monitor wintered in Rotterdam. In August 1873 Heiligerlee was near Tiengemeten with the Krokodil and the Tijger. The squadron was to test a barrier of ropes that would bar the 'Hitsertsche Gat' north of the island. The test was successful: The Tijger got stuck in the ropes and had to be pulled back to Hellevoetsluis, where divers removed the ropes.

J.A. Roëll was appointed to replace Meijen by 31 March 1874. In August 1875 the monitor Adder collided with Heiligerlee. The ram of Adder hit Heiligerlee on the port side between the first mast and the turret, and made a big hole below the waterline / armor. The double bottom and compartmentalization made that Heiligerlee stayed afloat and reached Hellevoetsluis under its own power. The damage was fixed in a few days in the dry dock.

On 15 October 1875 Heiligerlee was taken out of service, and Roëll relieved of his command., a measure probably meant to economize on the fleet. On 16 May 1876 Heiligerlee would be taken into service again under Lieutenant 1st class K.W.E. von Leschen. After being taken out of service again later in the year, Heiligerlee went to Feyenoord, where she got new boilers and other repairs.

== Heiligerlee is laid up: 1877–1887 ==
In April 1877 Heiligerlee went to Hellevoetsluis to be laid up. On 15 September 1884 Heiligerlee arrived in Amsterdam under tow.

=== Re-armament ===
In 1886 the Heilgerlee was re-armed at the Rijkswerf in Amsterdam. The two 23 cm muzzle-loading armstrong guns were replaced by a single 28 cm breech loading Krupp gun, known in Holland as 28 cm A No. 1, 22 calibers long.

== Service record: 2nd Term 1887–1895 ==
To all appearances Heilgerlee had not been in service for 10 years when she was taken into service on 21 June 1887, under lieutenant 1st class A.J. Krabbe. One of its first actions was to experiment with an electrical light of 25,000 candles. The ship then went to Ijmuiden from where she left for Hellevoetsluis on 8 July. From there she participated in maneuvers near Willemstad in August. In late August she steamed from Hellevoetsluis to Rotterdam. While there in the evening of 27 August, the demonstration of its electrical search light made a huge impression on the locals. In October 1887 the Heilgerlee was decommissioned in Amsterdam 'in the usual way'

On 1 May 1892 Heiligerlee was commissioned again. Captain O.C.A.J. Moreau would command Heiligerlee, three other monitors and 4 gunboats. In early May the Heilgerlee, the Cerberus and the gunboats Wodan, Thor and Brak left Amsterdam for Terschelling, where they exercised. After returning to Amsterdam Heiligerlee made several cruises on the Zuiderzee. While sailing on the Zuiderzee and exercising with the turret, a leg of one of its sailors got stuck and was crushed. Heiligerlee next visited Harlingen, where one of its sailors saved a 4-year-old from drowning. On 21 July 1892 Moreau's squadron, consisting of Heiligerlee, Panter, Tijger, Krokodil and gunboats Wodan, Thor and Hadda, arrived in Nieuwe Diep from the Zuiderzee.

In September 1892 Vice-Admiral Mac Leod organized exercises near Enkhuizen. Due to the use of electrical light these were viewed by hundreds of spectators. Heiligerlee was planned to decommission in October 1892. In 1893 Heiligerlee seems to have remained in dock.

=== An embarrassing incident near Urk ===
In March 1894 Heiligerlee went into dry dock. It was August when she was put into service again under Captain-Lt W.G. van Nes. On 1 September she arrived in Nieuwediep. She later sailed to Terschelling for some shooting exercises. On 11 October 1894 the Heilgerlee lost its course on the Zuiderzee. Meeting the Urk fisherman UK-152, the fisher demanded 10 guilders to point out the direction to Urk. After some haggling this was brought down to 5 guilders, and so the fisherman led the way to Urk. On 16 November Heiligerlee was again decommissioned.

== Heiligerlee is laid up again 1896–1905 ==
In April 1896 Heiligerlee went into dry dock in Amsterdam. She would not sail again for 10 years.

== Service Record: 3rd term 1905–1909 ==
=== Some uneventful cruises ===
On 1 January 1905 the Heilgerlee was again brought into service under Captain-lt P.C. Swaan. By 18 March 1905 Swaan was replaced by G. Witsen Elias. On 8 July Elias was in turn temporarily replaced by Lieutenant P.H. Cool. On 24 July Captain-Lt J.A.A.C. Ridder van Rappard became the new commander of the Heilgerlee. By 3 July 1906 Captain-lt J.W. Termijtelen became commander of Heiligerlee. He made some uneventful cruises.

=== A strike in Rotterdam ===
On 16 January 1907 Captain-Lt H.M. van Straaten became the new commander of Heiligerlee. On 4 June 1907 she got stuck near Urk. Later that year she sailed to Harlingen and Nieuwediep.

In September 1907 Heiligerlee sailed to Rotterdam together with the Piet Hein. She was ordered to assist the authorities and the monitor Matador in keeping order during a large strike by the dock workers. During the conflict Heiligerlee was in the Spuikanaal and guarded a ship housing workers from Germany, who had been hired to break the strike. While the Heilgerlee was in the Spoorhaven, a rowboat tried to reach the ship with the foreign workers in the evening of 26 October. The Marines guarding the harbor noticed this, and some shots were exchanged. According to the socialist news the rowboat was sunk by the guard stationed at Heiligerlee. After the authorities were convinced that the conflict had been resolved, Heiligerlee left Rotterdam for Hook of Holland on 25 November 1907. On 29 November Heiligerlee arrived in IJmuiden.

=== Towards the end of her service ===
On 16 January 1908 Captain-lt K.J. Karseboom became the new commander of Heiligerlee Heiligerlee made its usual trips, including a visit to Harlingen. It seemed that Heiligerlee was on her way to even more uneventful years of service, when in late November 1908 the Algemeen Handelsblad started an influential serie of articles called 'the battle-worthiness of our fleet'. The series ended with a recommendation to decommission the Heilgerlee and Renier Claeszen. The specific complaint about Heiligerlee was that 111 men were employed to operate one outdated gun.

=== Decommissioned and broken up ===
On 8 December 1908 the government decided to decommission Heiligerlee on 6 January 1909. This news did not imply that the Heilgerlee would be decommissioned, but this was soon thought.

In late 1909 the proposed budget for 1910 stated that Heiligerlee would be sold. This was planned for 21 April 1910 The auction was won by the Ship breakers Company R. Bos Pzn. from Dordrecht for 42,000 guilders. The Heilgerlee was then towed from IJmuiden to Dordrecht by the tugboat Gouwzee from L. Smit & Co
