= HNLMS Draak =

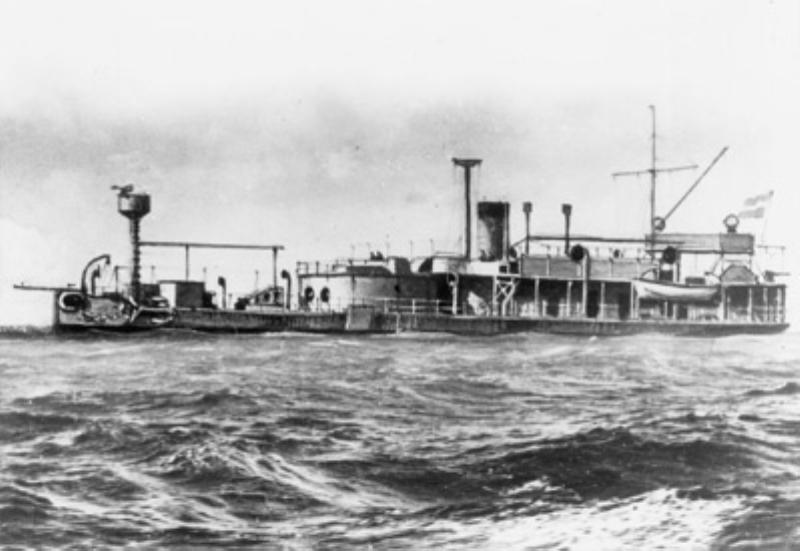
- Draak

History

Netherlands
- Name: Draak
- Namesake: Dragon
- Builder: Rijkswerf, Amsterdam
- Cost: ? florins
- Laid down: 15 November 1875
- Launched: 22 August 1877
- Fate: Sold 1914 and broken up

General characteristics
- Type: Ram Monitor
- Displacement: 2,155 metric tons (2,121 long tons)
- Length: 213 ft 6 in (65.1 m) (p/p)
- Beam: 49 ft 21 in (15.5 m)
- Draught: 10 ft 8 in (3.3 m)
- Installed power: 807 ihp (602 kW)
- Speed: 8.4 knots (15.6 km/h; 9.7 mph)
- Complement: ?
- Armament: 2 × 28 cm A No. 1; 1 - 120 mm (5 in) mortar; 1 - 70-millimetre (2.8 in) rifled gun; 1 - 50-millimetre (2.0 in) rifled gun
- Armour: Belt: 140–204 mm (6–8 in); Gun turrets: 229–305 mm (9–12 in)

HNLMS Draak (Dutch: Draak) was a monitor (Dutch: rammonitor 1e klasse), built by the Rijkswerf at Amsterdam for the Royal Netherlands Navy in the late 1870s.

== Design and description ==
In early 1875, the Dutch Navy in the home waters consisted of 4 ram turret ships, 10 monitors and 16 gunboats. All but two of these were armed with 23 cm muzzle loading guns. This is probably why the Dutch preferred to stick with the 23 cm gun. When England finally admitted the superiority of breech-loading guns over muzzle-loading guns, the Dutch government followed suit.

The switch from 23 cm muzzle-loaders to 28 cm breech-loaders would have strong effects on the design of Dutch monitors. The contract for the preceding monitor Luipaard, ordered in July 1875, only called for a change to breech-loaders, not to an overall redesign. The result was a monitor nearly identical to the previous ten monitors, but armed with 1 breech-loading 28 cm gun instead of two 23 cm muzzle-loaders.

Draak was designed from the start to balance hull and armament. She was to have two 28 cm breech-loaders. This necessitated a 33% increase in size compared to the preceding Luipaard. The 33% increase in size and equivalent increase in cost, led to double the amount of firepower.

With a displacement of 2156t Draak was about the same size as the Ram turret ships of the Buffel class and the Schorpioen class. The specific task of Draak was the defense of the Texel roadstead and the Zuiderzee. Therefore she had a draught of only 3.30 meters (10 ft 10 in), so she could sail these shallow waters. This shallow draught was compensated by a beam of 15.0 meters (49 ft 3 in).

=== Propulsion ===
The machinery for Draak was made by the Koninklijke Fabriek van Stoom- en andere Werktuigen in Amsterdam. The two machines had a nominal power of 160 hp each. They had diagonally placed cylinders that could make 120 moves per minute by 65 English pounds of steam pressure in the boilers.

=== Armament ===
The main armament of Draak consisted of two 28 cm A No. 1 breech-loaders made by Krupp. At the time of her construction these were also referred to as 600 pounders.

=== Armor ===
Draak had a belt of wrought iron that ranged from 204 millimeters (8.0 in) thick, to 140 millimeters (5.5 in). The gun turret, was protected by 230-millimeter (9.1 in) armor plates.

== Service ==
On 28 June 1879 Draak left the port of IJmuiden and reached Texel. In July 1879 she was on sea trials in the Texel roadsted. The results were not good. Several parts of the main machinery overheated, and attaining full speed was not possible. In a new attempt on 14 August she was more successful. She attained the designed speed and other expectations.
