= RML 9-inch Armstrong Gun =

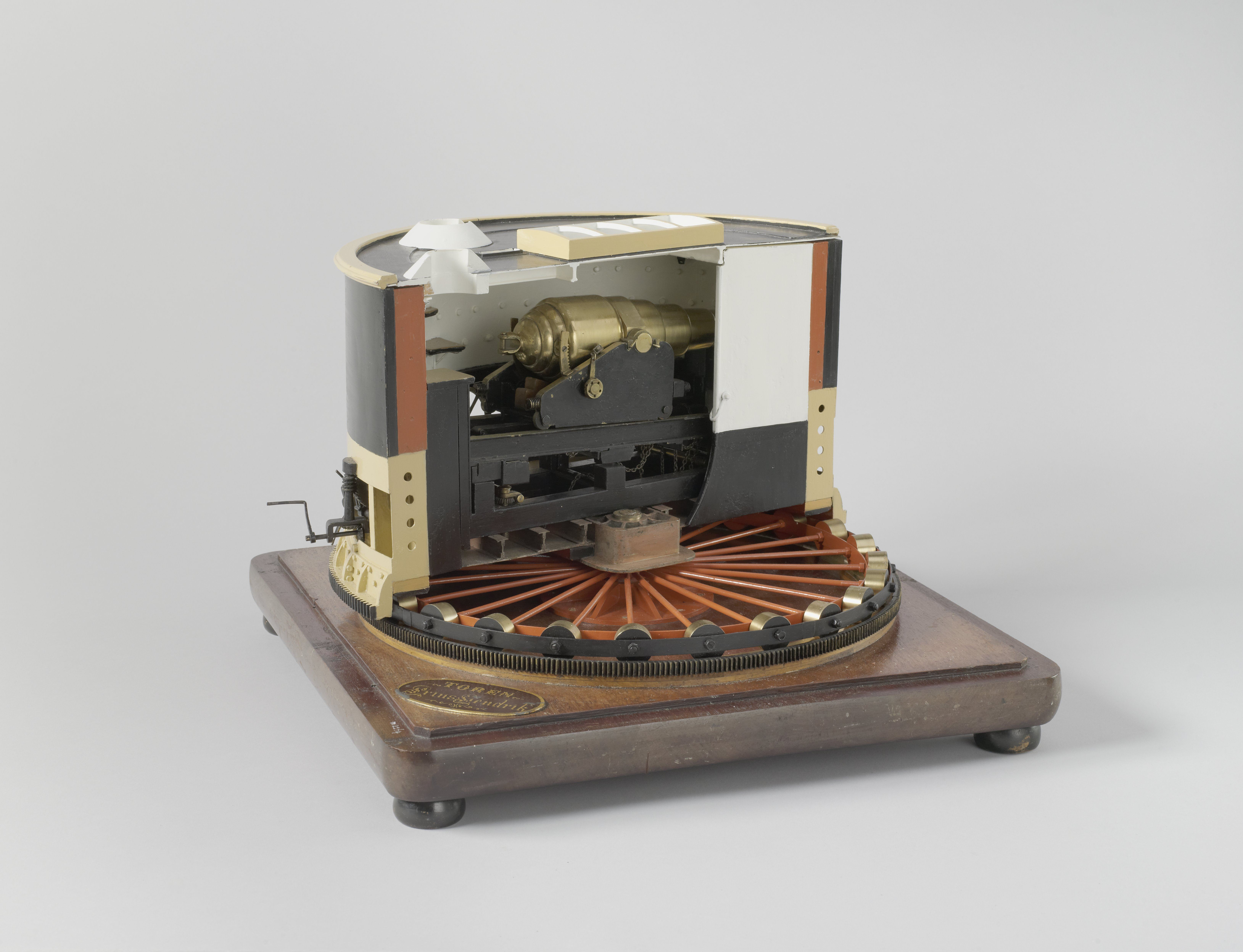
- Big model of gun turret on HNLMS Prins Hendrik, showing RML 9-inch Armstrong Gun.
- Type: Naval gun Coast defence gun
- Place of origin: United Kingdom

Service history
- In service: 1867
- Used by: Royal Netherlands Navy; Spanish Navy (Armada Española)

Production history
- Manufacturer: Elswick Ordnance Company

Specifications
- Mass: 12,300 kg
- Length: 3.962 m
- Calibre: 9-inch (229 mm)
- Muzzle velocity: 1,476 feet per second (450 m/s)

The RML 9-inch Armstrong Gun was a rifled muzzle loading gun, used in substantial numbers by the Dutch navy, the Spanish Navy, and other navies. It should not be confused with the RML 9-inch 12-ton gun, used in the British Royal Navy.

== Context ==
=== The rifled breechloader ===
The United Kingdom would adhere to smooth bore guns for a rather long time. In 1850 it held trials with existing foreign rifled breechloading guns designed by Wahrendorff and Cavalli. The outcome was that the government thought that the practical advantage of using these on board ships was limited. Therefore, the United Kingdom primarily adhered to grenade guns and 68 and 32-pounder smooth bore guns. When France started to rifle and reinforce her old cannon, Britain ordered a similar conversion of 300 of its old cannon. This conversion totally failed during the first trials.

=== The Armstrong gun ===
Meanwhile William Armstrong, 1st Baron Armstrong, inventor and owner of a large machine factory, had developed another rifled breechloading gun (RBL), the Armstrong gun. In January 1859 a very successful trial of his 18-pounder version took place. Armstrong then became engineer of rifled ordnance, a new post with a very high salary. The Armstrong guns would be produced at the Royal Works at Woolwich as well as at the new Elswick Ordnance Company founded in Newcastle on 1 January 1859. The latter was founded with government support. It was to guarantee the separation of Armstrong's interests as a civil servant and his interests as a machine builder.

For the navy, the Armstrong breechloaders came in 40-pounder, 70-pounder and 110-pounder caliber. In combat and trials, the guns up to and including 40-pounder (4.75 inch) caliber, proved to be very successful after some modifications had been made. In the 1863 Bombardment of Kagoshima the eight 110-pounder (7 inch) guns involved were also very successful. They were a bit liable to disturbances, but the problem with the wedge breech was solved to satisfaction.

In 1864 a comparative test of three types of 70-pounder guns took place. In this test, the Armstrong breechloader could not stand up against newer Rifled Muzzle Loaders (RML) designed by himself and Whitworth. The system of rifling employed in the breechloaders was deemed inferior to the system used in newer muzzle loaders, and was more expensive. A more fundamental problem was that the breechloading mechanism could not withstand the explosive force required to give heavy projectiles the speed needed to pierce armor. Armstrong would indeed withdraw his breechloader from the competition when it came to armor penetration tests.

=== The Woolwich gun ===
The Royal Navy next returned to muzzle-loading rifled guns. These became known as Woolwich guns. Armstrong had improved the Royal Artillery works at Woolwich to produce his breechloaders, but left office in 1863. The Woolwich Works then started to manufacture RML guns. These used Armstrong's method of manufacturing the gun barrel, and the first attempts to produce a RML also used his shunt principle for rifling. This is why one could carelessly refer to these guns as Armstrong guns, but they were not manufactured by Armstrong's company, which would then be known as Elswick Ordnance Company, part of Armstrong's. In 1865 Woolwich introduced RML's of 7, 8 and 9-inch. These used a new rifling system called the Woolwich system, and the guns were thus named Woolwich guns.

=== The Armstrong RML ===
While the Royal Navy made its own guns at Woolwich, Armstrong's Elswick Ordnance Company in Newcastle was merged back into the Armstrong company. Elswick also continued to produce heavy guns, but now only for export. One of these was a 9-inch RML, referred to by the Dutch and others as a 23 cm Armstrong gun. Therefore, the Dutch and others referred to an Armstrong gun, meaning that it was manufactured by Armstrong at Elswick. The British could not afford to refer to the gun by the manufacturer's name without using the qualifier 'Muzzle Loading', because in England, an 'Armstrong gun' referred to the Armstrong gun, which denotes a type of gun, not the manufacturer of the gun.

== Characteristics ==
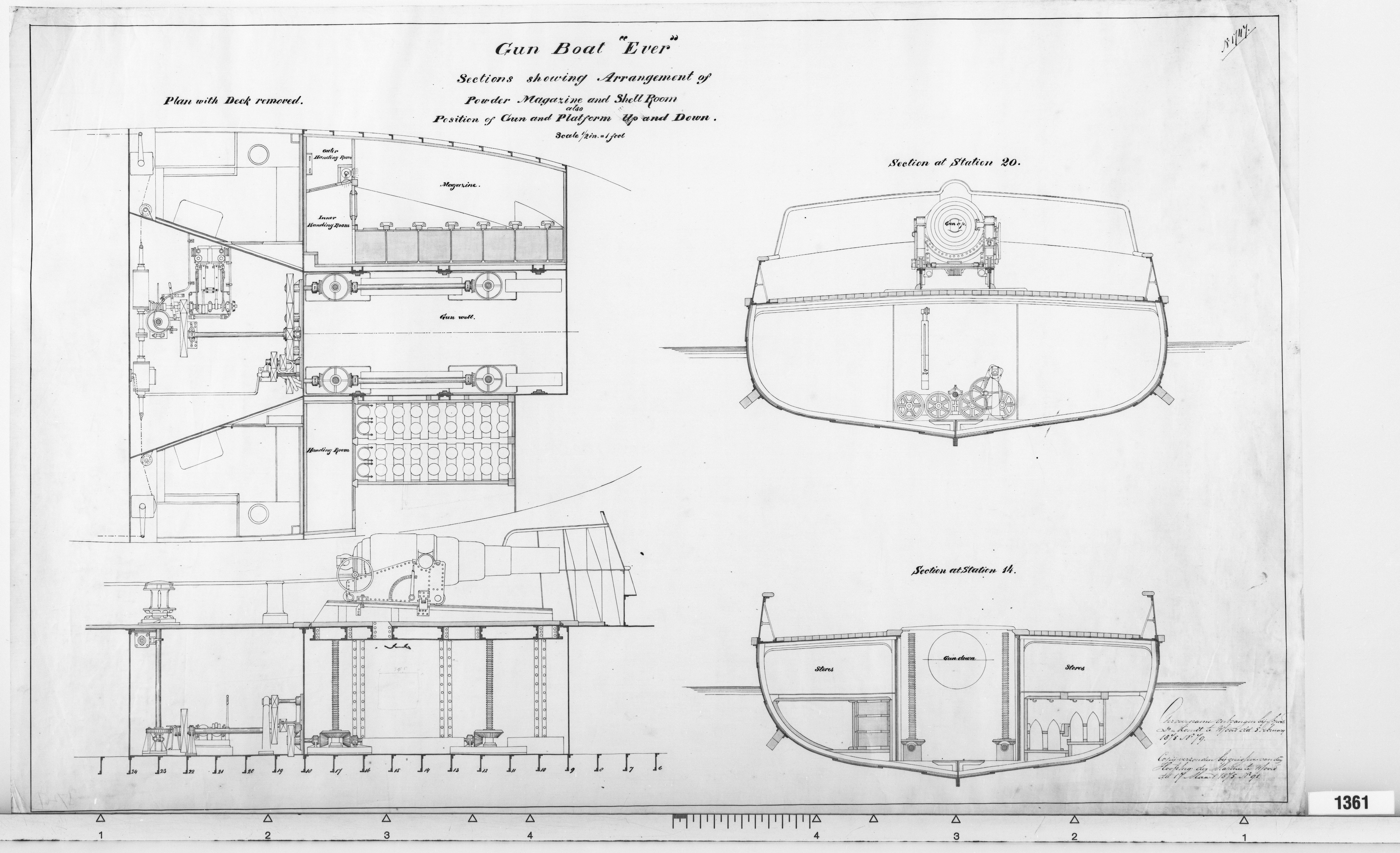
23 cm Armstrong RML on Ever

The general characteristics of the 23 cm Armstrong RML, like length and caliber were the same as those of the 9-inch Woolwich gun.

=== Number of coils ===
A marked difference between the Armstrong gun and the Woolwich guns was in the number of coils. The Armstrong method of producing the gun, consisted of making a steel barrel, and reinforcing it with wrought iron coils, so it would not burst from the explosive force inside. Of course the area nearest to the explosion needed most reinforcement, and the area near the mouth of the gun the least.

The Armstrong gun retained the original larger number of smaller coils, which was more expensive to make. On pictures these coils show as humps as the gun gets smaller while it protrudes to the front. See the picture of a 23 cm Armstrong RML on HNLMS Ever. Cf. the picture of the four principal models (marks) of the 9-inch Woolwich gun. Mark I of the Woolwich gun has one coil less than the Armstrong gun. Later models have even less coils, with the number of humps decreasing as the marks get simpler.

=== Models ===
In the Dutch Navy, the first four guns differed from later models. These first guns had steel barrels which were 'open' at the rear. These were closed by a separate steel closing piece with a copper backing sheet, which was pressed on to the rear by the large screw breech. All later Dutch models had a steel barrels out of one piece.

== Usage ==
=== Dutch Navy ===
HNLMS Prins Hendrik der Nederlanden was the first significant armored ship of the Dutch Navy, and received the first four guns. There is a huge number of references to the ship having Armstrong guns. The reference that says it had guns "made in Newcastle", shows that these refer to the RML 9-inch Armstrong Gun. Four smaller ironclads and 10 monitors would also get twin 9-inch Armstrong guns in a single tower. 14 gunboats of the Ever class would get single 9-inch Armstrong guns. The first two of these boats were built by Armstrong Whitworth.

=== Spanish Navy ===
In Spain the ironclad Méndez Núñez had four 9-inch Armstrong guns in a central battery, as did the central battery ironclad Zaragoza. The central battery ironclad Sagunto had eight, as did the broadside ironclad Vitoria.

== Ammunition ==
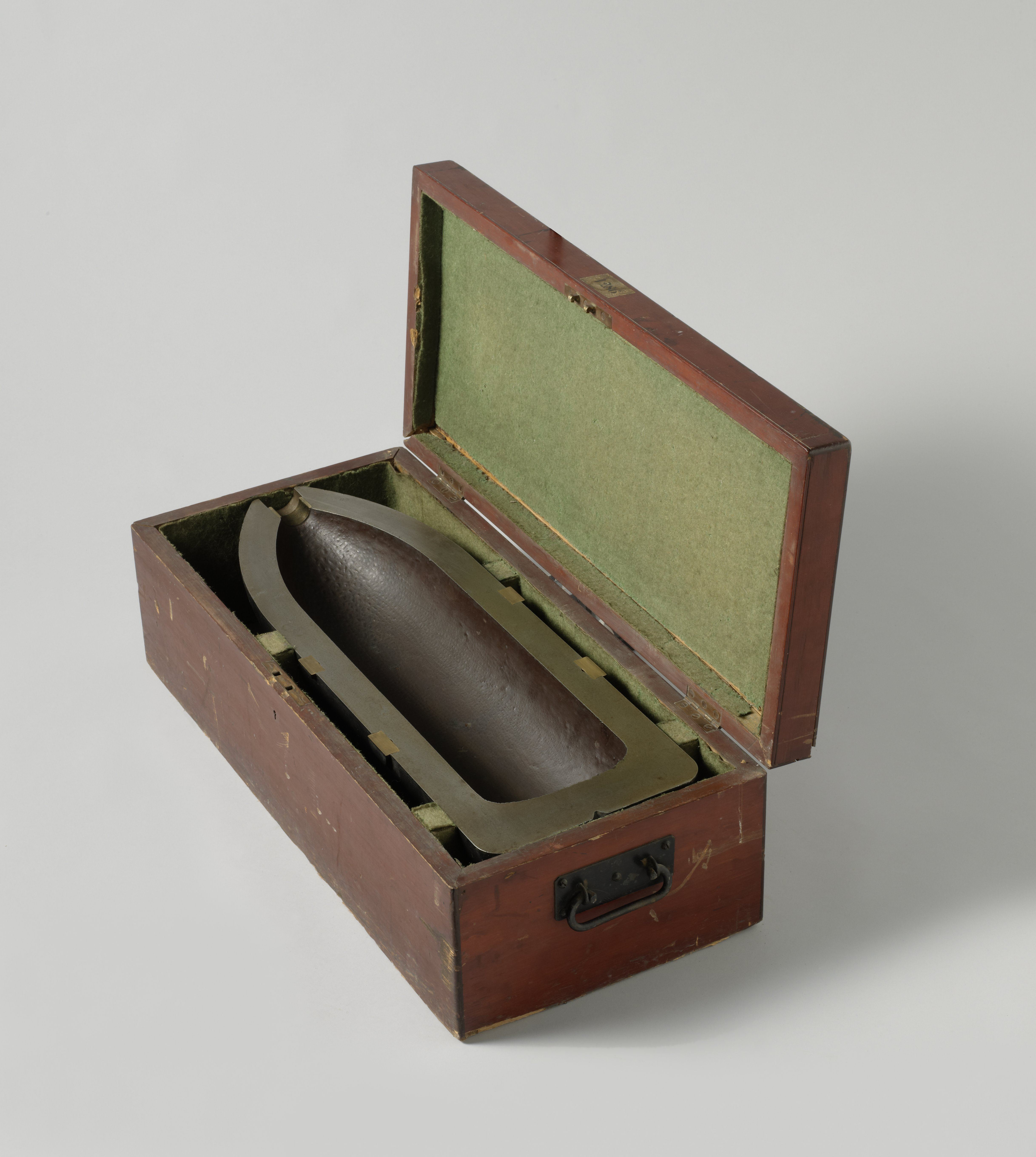
23 cm Armstrong grenade

=== Dutch ammunition ===
The Dutch used three kinds of pointed projectiles with the 9-inch Armstrong gun: a normal iron projectile of 68 centimetres (27 in) and 105 kilograms (231 lb), a hardened projectile of 52 centimetres (20 in) and 112 kilograms (247 lb), and a steel projectile of 51 centimetres (20 in) and 109 kilograms (240 lb). There was also a massive "pointed bullet" (puntkogel) 46 centimetres (18 in) (sic!) long and weighing 113 kilograms (249 lb), which was of course also shaped like a cylinder. Finally, there were three kinds of shrapnel shell of 68.5 kilograms (151 lb).
