= Slipway =

Shore ramp from which boats or ships can be lowered into or raised out of the water

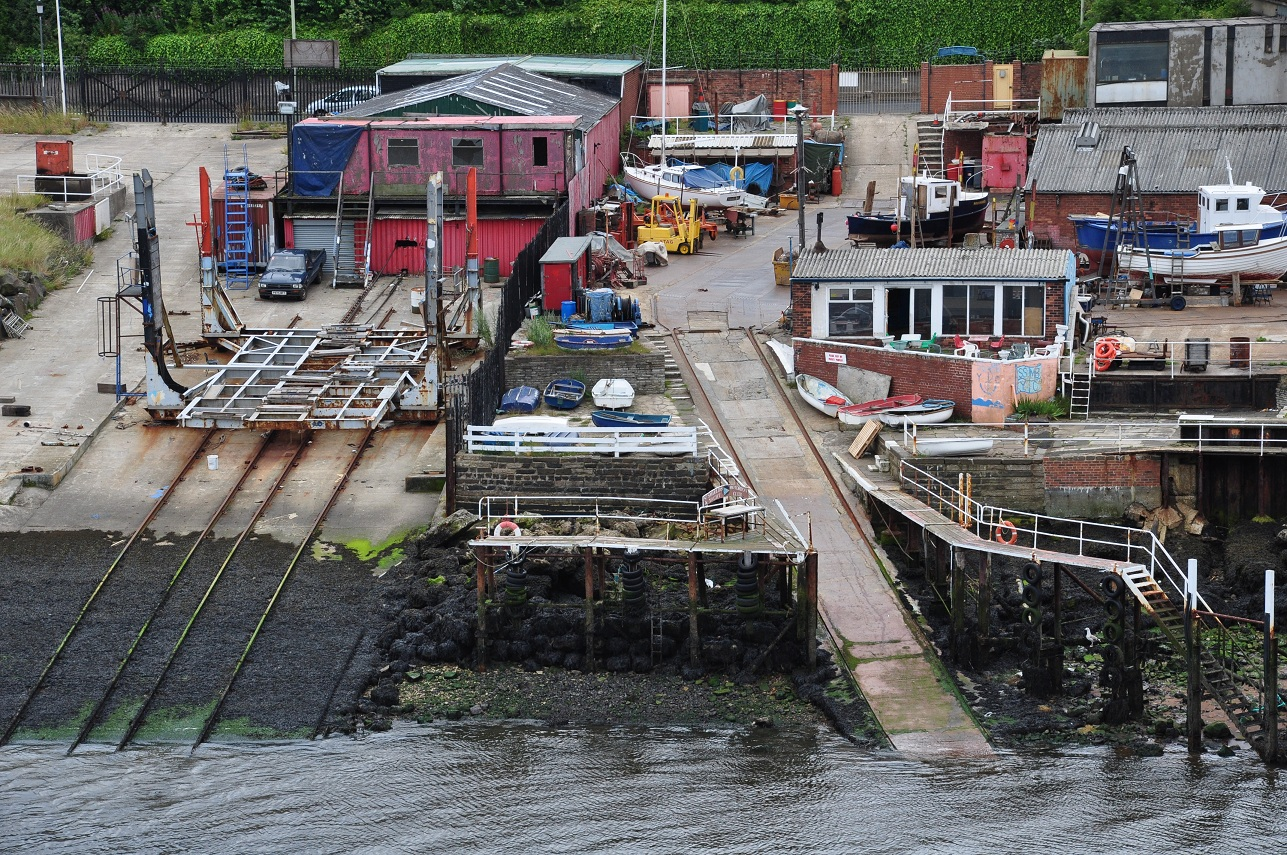
Slipways in the harbour of South Shields, Tyne and Wear, England

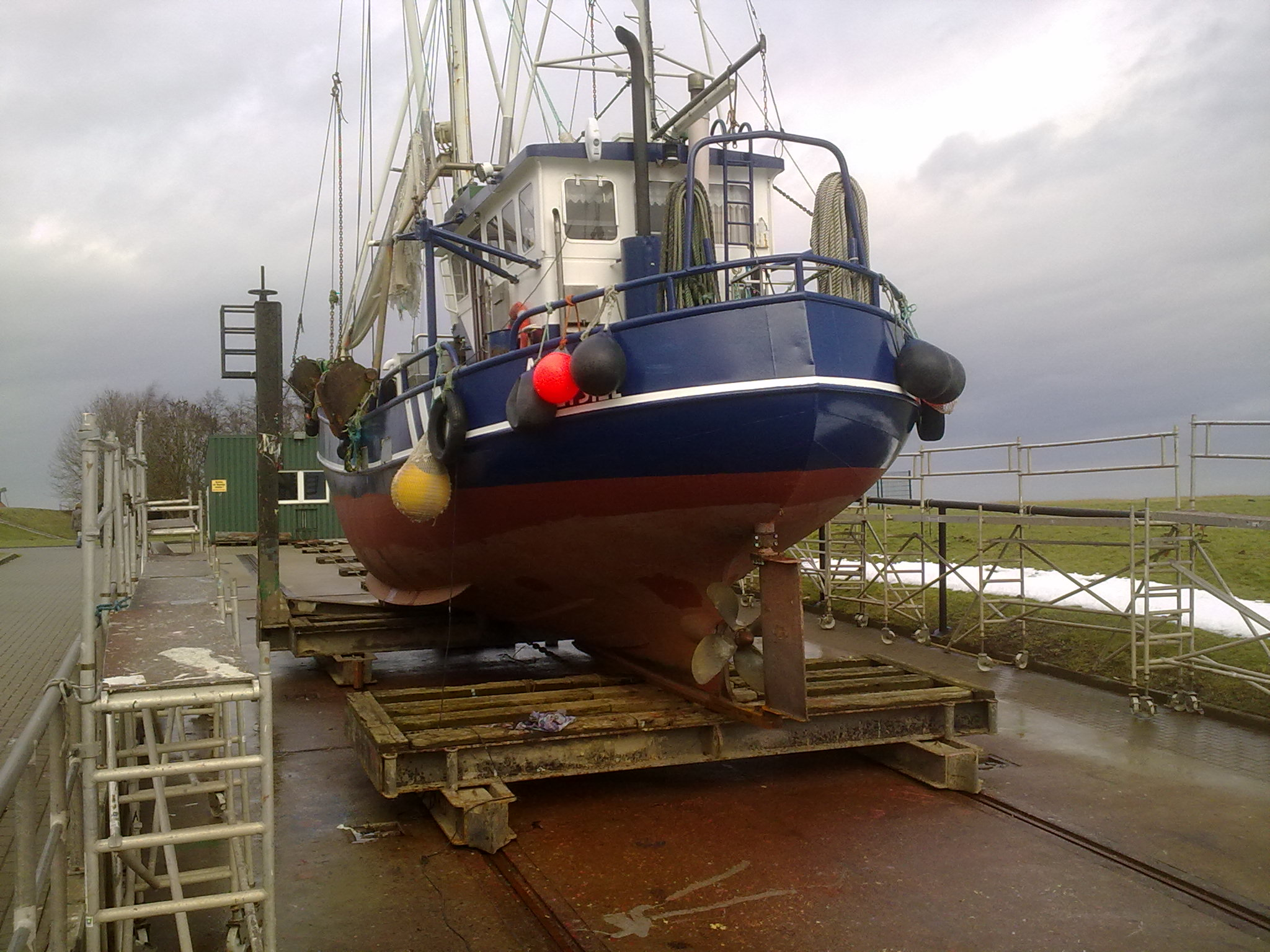
Small slipway in Greetsiel, Germany, 2011

A slipway is a ramp on the shore by which ships and other vessels can be moved to and from the water. They are used for repairing and sometimes building ships and boats.

As the word "slip" implies, the ships or large boats slide over the ramp. Prior to the move the vessel's keel is coated with grease, which then allows the ship or boat to "slip" off the ramp and progress safely into the water. Slipways are used to launch (newly built) large ships, but can only dry-dock or repair smaller ships.

Pulling large ships against the greased ramp would require too much force. Therefore, for dry-docking large ships, one must use carriages supported by wheels or by roller-pallets. These types of dry-docking installations are called "marine railways". Nevertheless the words "slip" and "slipway" are also used for all dry-docking installations that use a ramp.

== Maintaining and repairing the hull of a ship ==
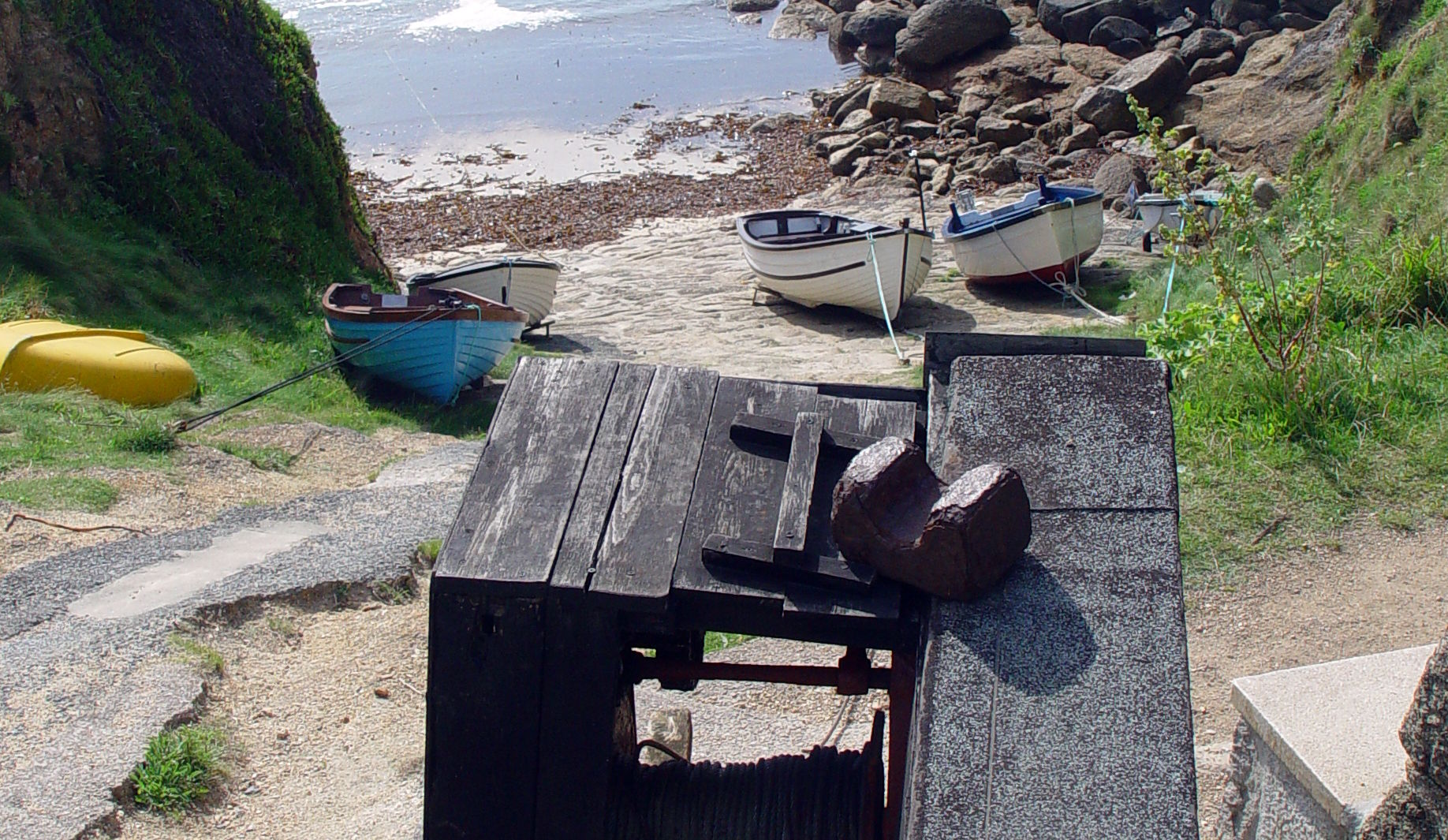
Beach capstan, Porthgwarra

The traditional method to gain access to the lower hull of a ship is called careening. In its most primitive form, this was done by beaching a ship, putting it dry at low tide. It is assumed that the ancient Egyptians already practised this.

One of the many problems related to careening was that it was primarily suitable for maintaining and small repairs. Major repairs were difficult and some repairs simply could not be done while the ship was on its side. In 1806, a Dutch newspaper noted that multiple Dutch ships of the line had been broken up, because some minor defects to the keels could not be solved by careening. By taking its first Dry Dock into use, the Dutch Navy solved this problem.

== Early slipways ==
The first artificial means for beaching were found at Carthage. Here, war galleys were drawn up a sloping shore on timber ways or slips. This was probably also done because the tidal range in the Mediterranean Sea is very small. Whatever the exact reason, it would have allowed the Carthaginians to effect all kinds of repairs.

For small vessels several practices were used. In early 19th century Britain, it was not uncommon to use capstans to pull vessels of up to and slightly over 200 tons up on the beach. Another practice involved towing a vessel up on rollers. These did not have an axle and therefore had to be placed in front of the vessel and then be replaced as the vessel moved up.

The word 'slipway' can be found in the English language from at least the mid-1830s. Appearing as two words, it was used to refer to two patent slips (see below) in 1834. In an 1832 instance it was used to refer to the 'ways' of a building slip that was used to drag a ship up on a slip in the traditional way, i.e. before the patent slip was invented.

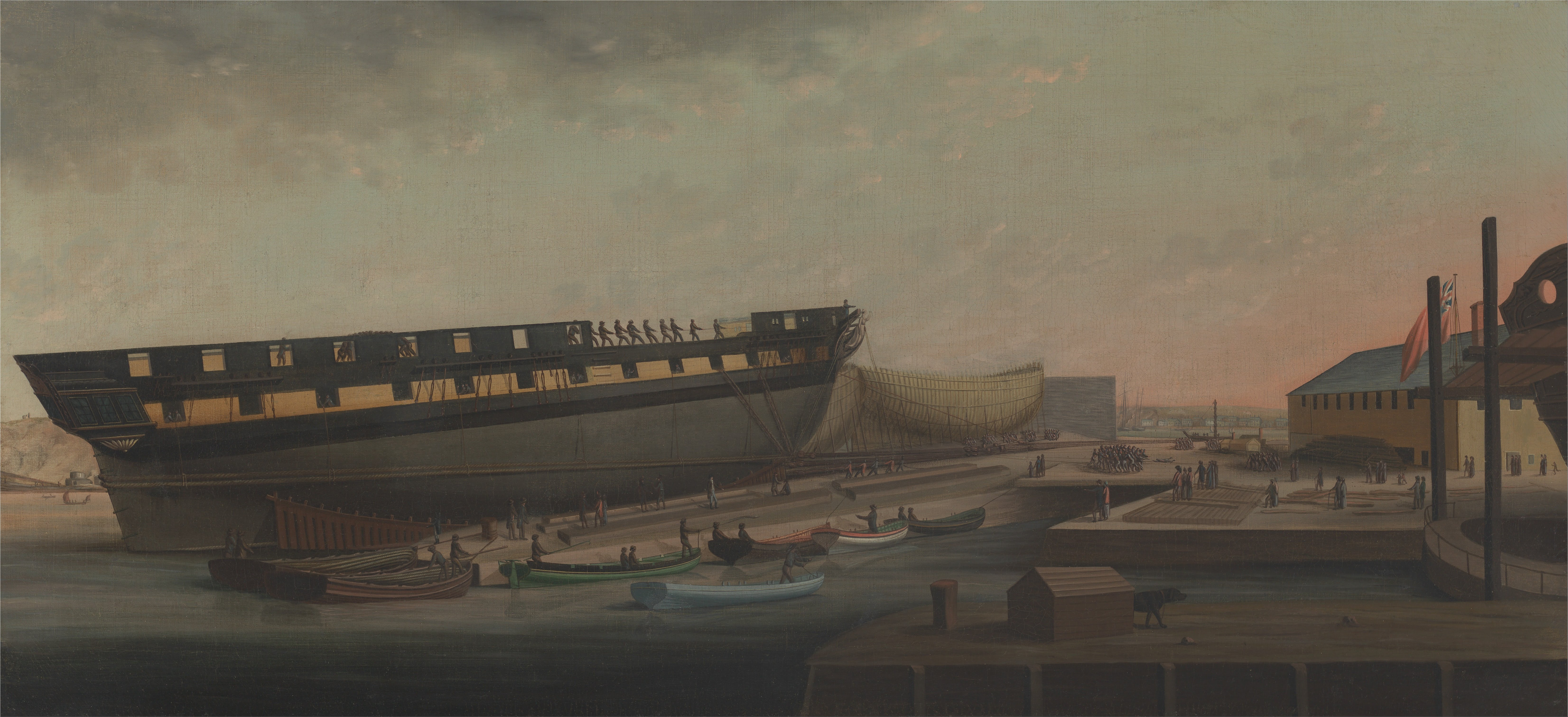
HMS Diana hauled up near Plymouth, 1813

In 1832, George Graham, a shipbuilder from Harwich described the traditional way of hauling a ship up on a slip. It involved capstans, laying ways, and use of a temporary cradle without wheels or rollers. It was a costly operation with high risk of damaging a vessel. Most of the cost arose from the fact that a ship had to be prepared in every way as though it were to be launched.

Mr. Graham dragged up ships of up to 1,000 tons. In 1817, the Royal Navy had gone further and had hauled up the ship of the line Kent of over 1,800 ton on to a 'regular' building slip. Therefore, it seemed that by 1817, every ship could be hauled up on a regular building slip.

If one considers the details of how Kent was hauled up, it becomes clear that many costly changes were made to the building slip in order to haul up Kent. This implies that already before the invention of the patent slip, there was a distinction between slips (i.e. building slips) and slipways (slips used to repair ships). In theory, both could be used for building and repairing, but it was more economical to configure a 'slip' for one primary purpose.

=== Early slipways in the Netherlands ===
The Dutch equivalent for slipway is sleephelling, in German this is schlepphelling. In the Netherlands, the distinction between slips meant for shipbuilding and slipways was therefore much clearer. In a 1699 announcement, the sale of a shipyard in The Hague was announced. It had two careening places and a 'sleephelling to tow up ships'. Many of these early Dutch slipways only catered to small vessels. However, some slipways were bigger. In 1796, the shipyard of the Admiralty of Rotterdam had three slips (hellingen) suitable to build ships of the line. It also had a single slipway (sleephelling). This was also suitable to build a frigate of 24 guns. This shows that this slipway was not able to haul up a ship of the line.

== Modern slipways ==
=== The patent slip ===
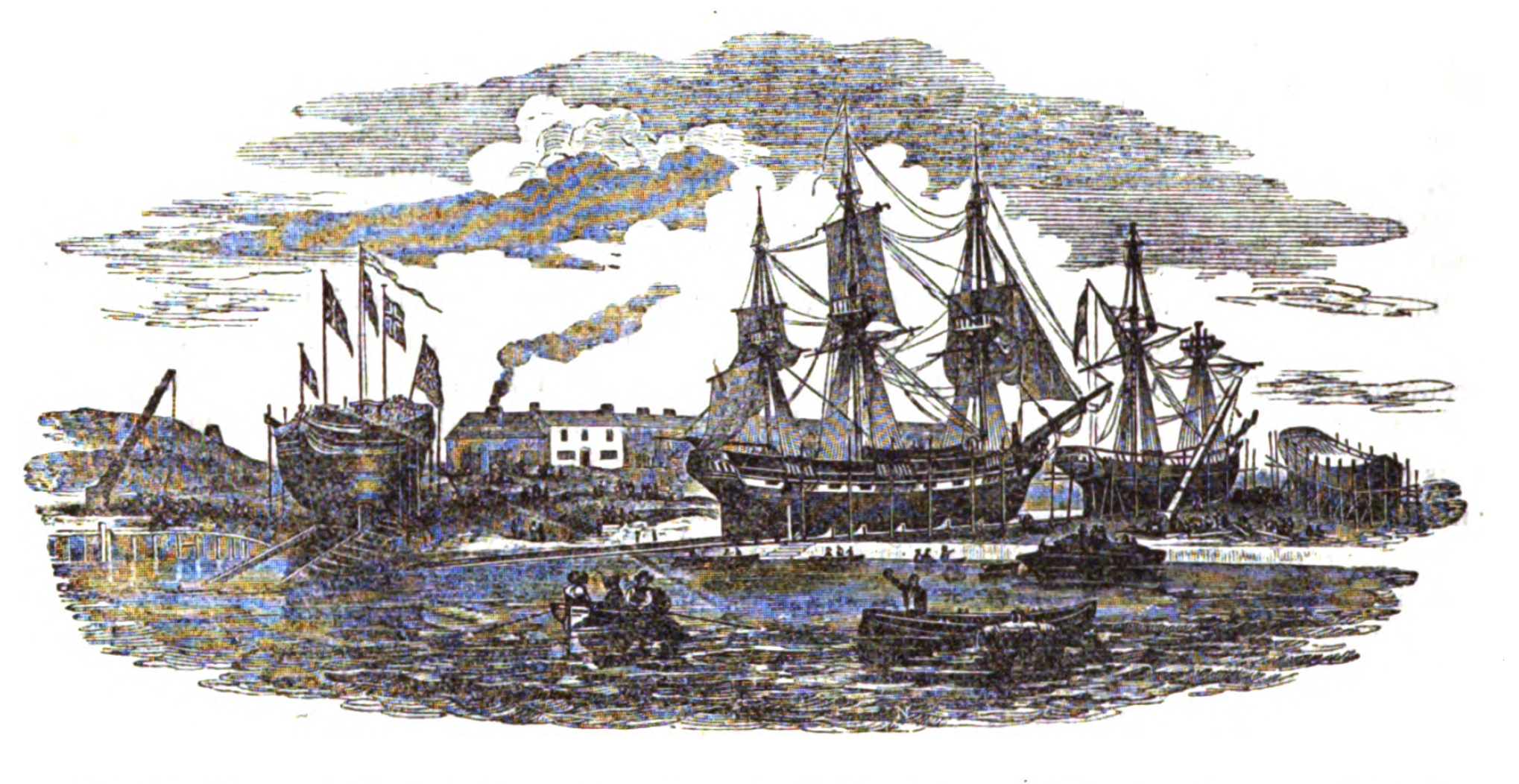
A slip and slipway in 1834

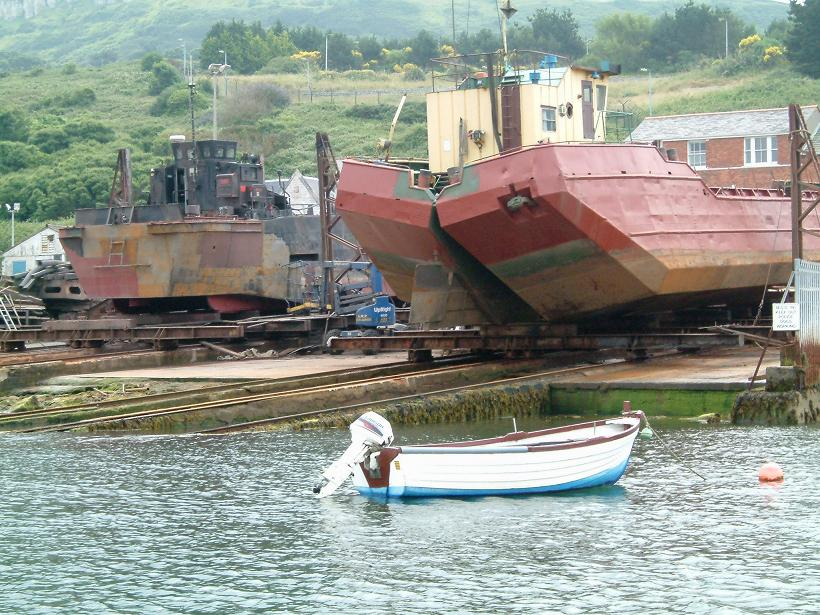
Two slipways at Portland Harbour – one holding a landing craft and the other a split dump barge (on right)

In 1817, the total cost of dragging up Kent was £1,436. The cost of bringing a first rate into a dry dock was only £35. However, building a dry dock cost about twenty times as much as constructing a regular (building) slip. No wonder that people sought for cheaper ways to put a ship dry for large repairs.

In 1819, Thomas Morton of Leith, Scotland introduced the first modern slipway. As it was an invention, he applied for a patent in the United Kingdom and its dependencies and obtained it. The patent led to the name patent slip. In a very extensive 1832 parliamentary discussion about a possible renewal (prolongation) of the patent, it was never called a 'slipway'. It was named 'patent slip', or simply 'slip'. About fifty years later, the patent slip was seen as the first slipway.

In many respects, the way that a patent slip got a vessel out of the water resembled the traditional method used on a building slip. Therefore, some people dared to say it was only an adaption of other inventions. After its inquiry, the House of Commons — which decided on these matters — clearly established that it was an invention.

A patent slip could be built upon an existing slip. It required relatively heavy piling directly below the keel of a vessel and somewhat lighter piling where its sides would be supported. If there was little or no tide, the slip had to be extended below the water level. Upon the slip itself, three lines of 'ways' were fixed. These ways carried three cast iron rails that formed a railway.

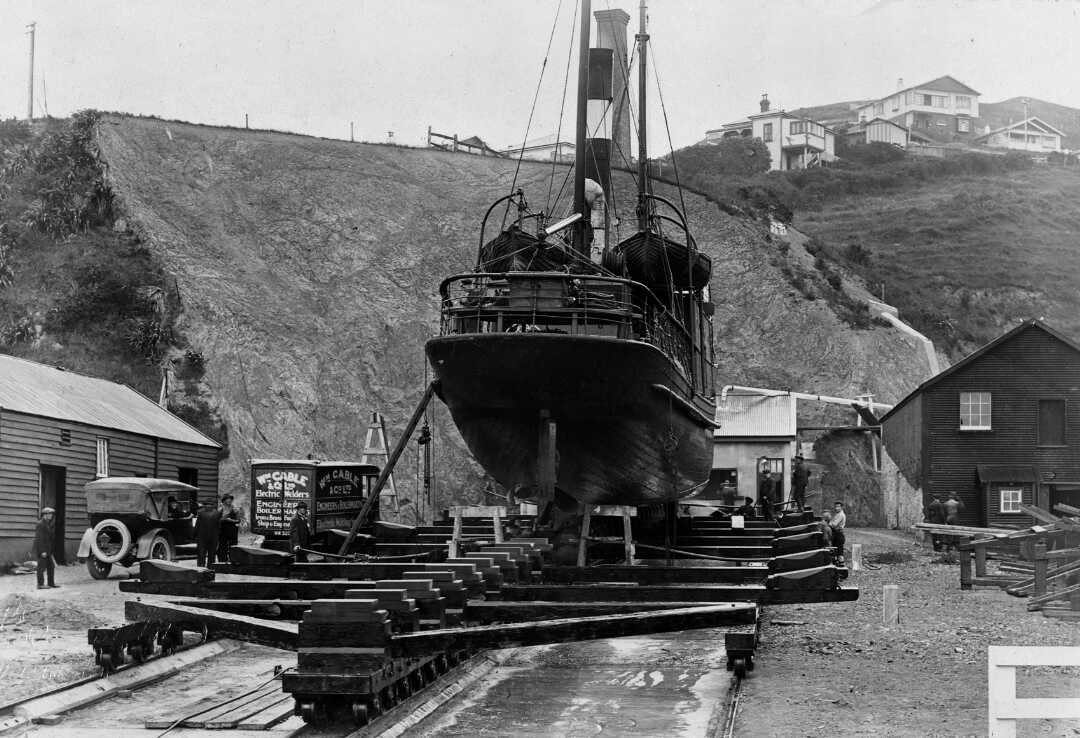
Ship cradle used near Wellington, NZ c. 1927

A ship cradle moved over the slip's railway. At high tide it was placed below a vessel. As it settled upon the cradle, the blocks were drawn under the ship when it was still two-thirds water-born. Cradle and ship were then towed up. Using a cradle on wheels was a decided change from simply placing rollers under a vessel.

The patent slip's ship cradle consisted of a long beam which supported the keel of a docking vessel, just like it was done in shipbuilding. On this beam were placed keel blocks to match the form of the keel. As soon as the keel rested on the keel blocks, other blocks were drawn in to fix the vessel in an upright position. The latter did not bear a substantial part of the weight.

At the tip of Morton's cradle was a purchase tackle by which the cradle was pulled up by a chain. A big advantage was that there was no pull on the ship. There was a security mechanism that kept the cradle from slipping down in case the chain broke. At first, pulling was done by hand, later steam power was used.

A patent slip required substantially more investment than a building slip. In 1832, Mr. George Graham, a shipbuilder of Harwich declared that he had spent £3,040 to change his simple (building) slip to a patent slip. £200 of this was for the Morton's patent, i.e. the license. Graham also stated that it would cost about £2,000 to establish a slip similar to the one he had before he changed it. It was therefore not economical to use a slipway as a building slip. In spite of this, it was probably done at times.

=== The slipway after 1832 ===
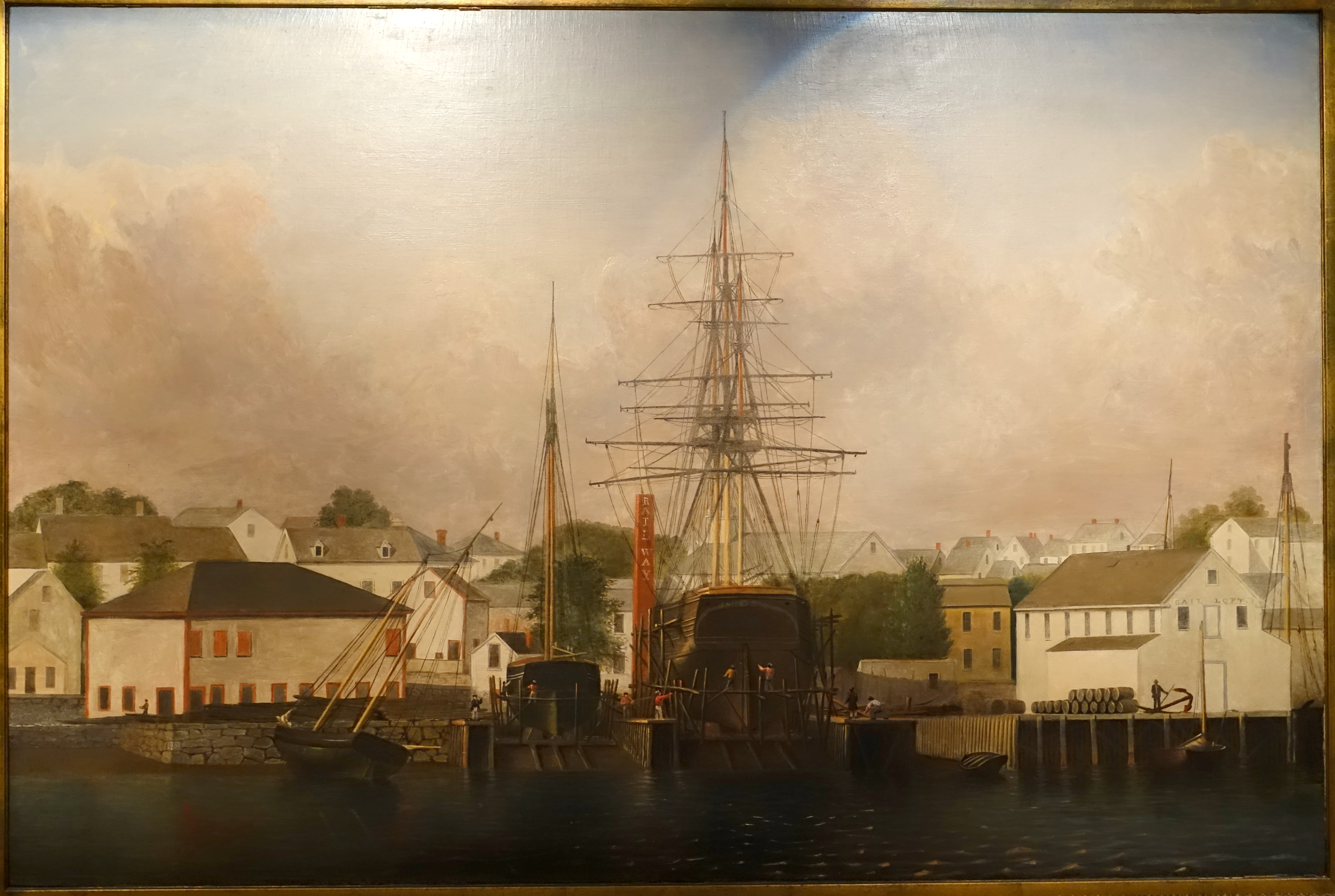
Gloucester Ma., the red banner reads: 'railway', 1857

Thomas Morton acquired his patent for Scotland on 18 August 1818. It would last for a period of 14 years. Somewhat later, he acquired the same patent for England, Ireland, and the colonies. In 1832, it was still quite clear that the term 'patent slip' referred to Thomas Morton's slipway.

By August 1832, the meaning of the term 'patent slip' would have become confusing. The patent had expired, but it would still be practical to make a distinction between slips configured for shipbuilding and those configured for repairs. It is probable that writers tried to solve this by re-using existing terminology. Two new terms were used: slipway and slipdock.

The word 'slipway' as in 'patent slip-way' was used to refer to two patent slips in 1834. This is obviously related to the shipbuilding practice of laying down the keel on a series of blocks. The way on which these blocks were laid could be called ground way or slip way. The upper part of the standing or ground ways from which a ship was launched was also referred to as the slipways (plural!).

The term 'slip dock' or 'patent slip dock' can also be traced back to at least 1834. This was repeated in 1837 and the term would remain about as popular as slipway. The logic of this term is in how a slipway was used. A dock was basically a facility where a ship could moor or attach without any preparations. A typical characteristic of the patent slip was that a vessel could be hauled up with its full load and rigging.

In the United States of America, the term 'Marine Railway' can be traced back to at least 1840. The term was generally accepted. In e.g. Maine alone, three companies with the words 'Marine Railway Company' in their name were incorporated in the 1840s. In British English, the term Marine Railway had earlier been applied to plans to transport ships across the Panama Isthmus by loading them onto railway cars. In Canada, this idea led to the Big Chute Marine Railway.

=== Improvements ===
An improvement to the cradle of some slipways was to make it telescopic. This meant that it was short while it was at the lower, shallow, end of the slipway and became longer as a vessel was hauled up. Some other slipways were provided with gates which shut at ebb. This meant that the slipway could be made shorter.

== Related concepts ==
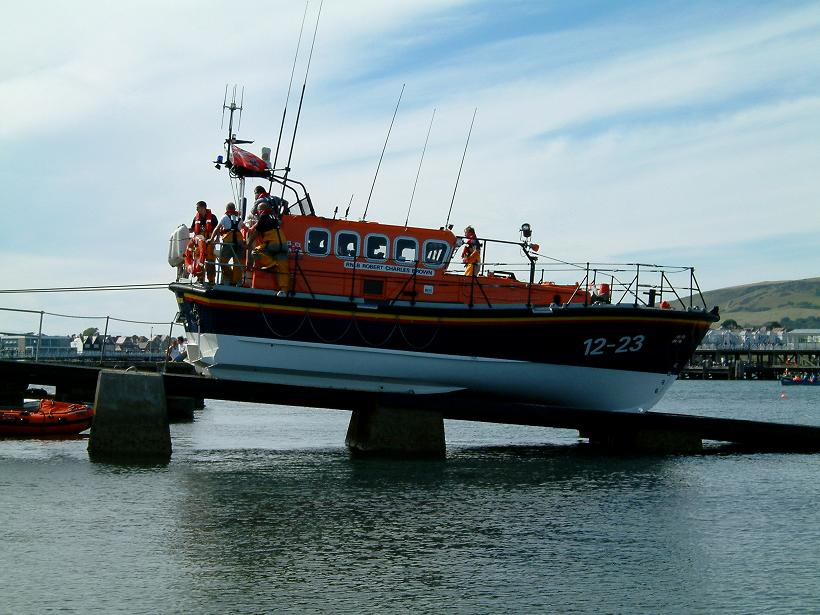
Lifeboat being winched back up its slipway after a launch

For launching and retrieving small boats, a boat ramp or boat launch may be used. A boat trailer is moved into the water. Traditionally, the boat then slides over the trailer by using a winch. Newer solutions let the boat drive off/on by its own power, or have it float off/on.

From 1925 onwards, modern whaling factory ships have usually been equipped by their designers with a slipway at the stern to haul harpooned whales on deck to be processed by flensers.

To achieve a safe launch of some types of land-based lifeboats in bad weather and difficult sea conditions, the lifeboat and slipway are designed so that the lifeboat slides down a relatively steep steel slip under gravity.

== Slipways in ship construction ==
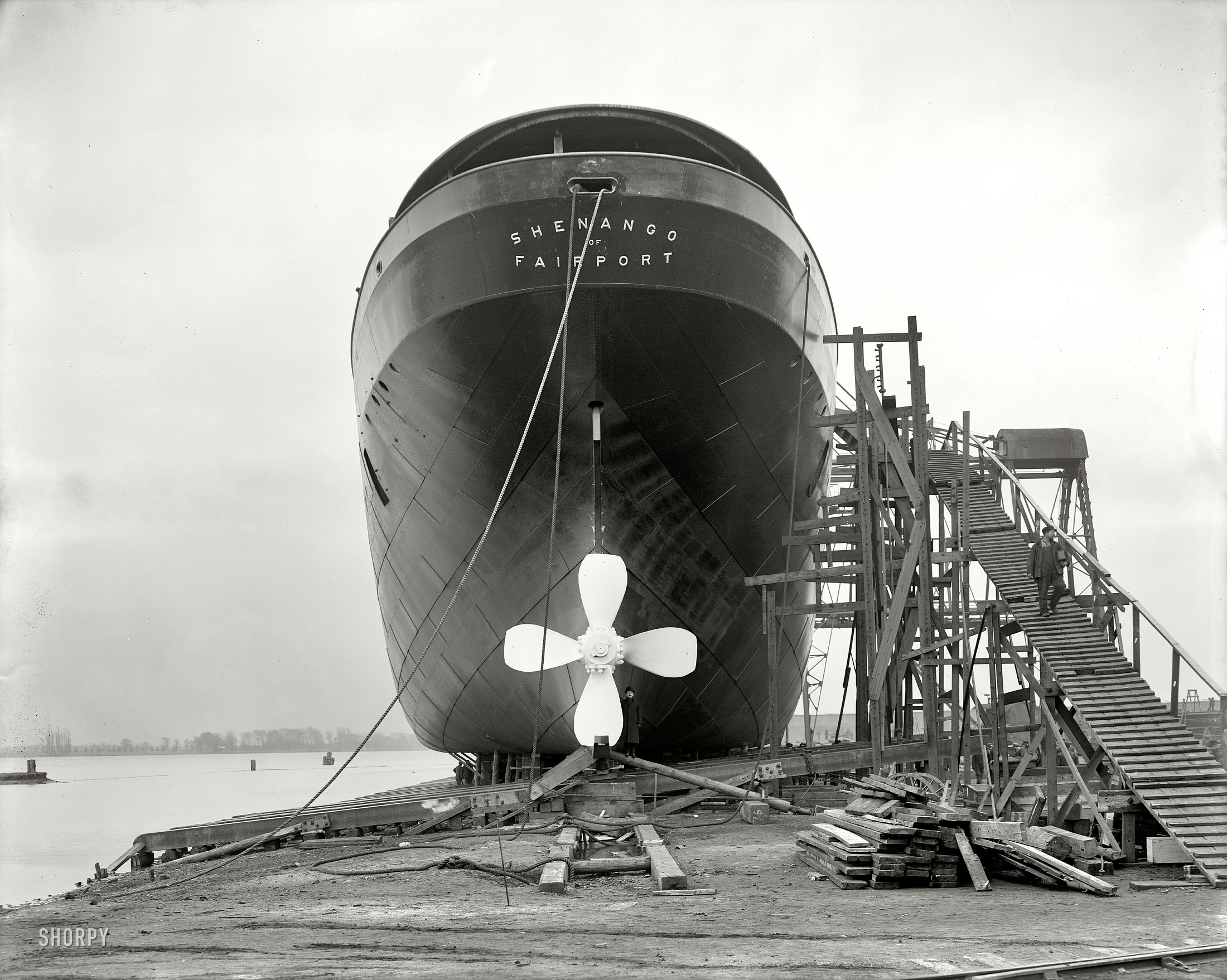
Lake freighter Shenango in a parallel slipway in 1909

For large ships, slipways are only used in construction of the vessel. They may be arranged parallel or perpendicular to the shore line (or as nearly so as the water and maximum length of vessel allows). On launching, the vessel slides down the slipway on the ways until it floats by itself. The process of transferring the vessel to the water is known as launching and is normally a ceremonial and celebratory occasion. It is the point where the vessel is formally named. At this point the hull is complete and the propellers and associated shafting are in place, but dependent on the depth of water, stability and weight the engines might have not been fitted or the superstructure may not be completed.

In a perpendicular slipway, the ship is normally built with its stern facing the water. Modern slipways take the form of a reinforced concrete mat of sufficient strength to support the vessel, with two "barricades" that extend to well below the water level taking into account tidal variations. The barricades support the two launch ways. The vessel is built upon temporary cribbing that is arranged to give access to the hull's outer bottom, and to allow the launchways to be erected under the complete hull. When it is time to prepare for launching a pair of standing ways are erected under the hull and out onto the barricades. The surface of these ways are greased (Tallow and whale oil were used as grease in sailing ship days). A pair of sliding ways is placed on top, under the hull, and a launch cradle with bow and stern poppets is erected on these sliding ways. The weight of the hull is then transferred from the build cribbing onto the launch cradle. Provision is made to hold the vessel in place and then release it at the appropriate moment in the launching ceremony, these are either a weak link designed to be cut at a signal or a mechanical trigger controlled by a switch from the ceremonial platform.

Some slipways are built so that the vessel is side on to the water and is launched sideways. This is done where the limitations of the water channel would not allow lengthwise launching, but occupies a much greater length of shore. The Great Eastern built by Brunel was built this way as were many landing craft during World War II. This method requires many more sets of ways to support the weight of the ship.

In both cases heavy chains are attached to the ship and the drag effect is used to slow the vessel once afloat until tugboats can move the hull to a jetty for fitting out.

The practice of building on a slipway is dying out with the increasing size of vessels from about the 1970s. Part of the reason is the space requirement for slowing and maneuvering the vessel immediately after it has left the slipway, but the sheer size of the vessel causes design problems, since the hull is basically supported only at its end points during the launch process and this imposes stresses not met during normal operation.

== See also ==
- Boat lift
- Canoe launch
- Dry dock
- Ferry slip
- Harbor
- Hoverport
- Patent slip (marine railway)
- Seaport
- Ship cradle
- Shiplift
- Travel lift
