= Buffel (disambiguation) =

Buffel might refer to:

- Buffel, a mine-resistant vehicle developed in South Africa
- HNLMS Buffel, early ironclad warship of the Royal Netherlands Navy
- NS Class 3400 or Buffel class locomotives
- Cenchrus ciliaris or Buffel grass
- Thomas Buffel, Belgian footballer
- Tine Buffel, sociologist and social gerontologist
- Büffel, German armoured recovery vehicle
