= HNLMS Guinea =

Dutch warship (1870)

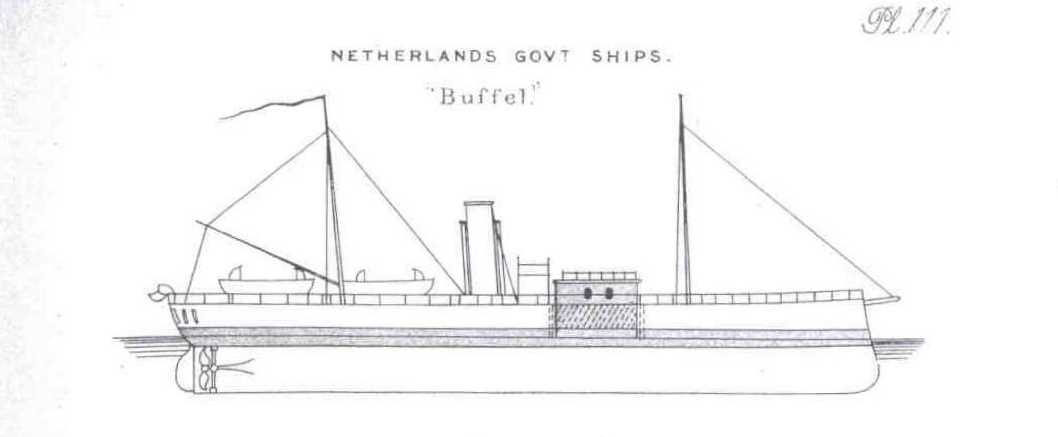
- Line drawing from Brassey's Naval Annual 1888

History

Netherlands
- Name: Guinea
- Namesake: Guinea
- Builder: Rijkswerf, Amsterdam
- Laid down: 1867
- Launched: 5 May 1870
- Completed: 16 October 1873
- Stricken: 1897
- Fate: Sold for scrap, 1897

General characteristics (as completed)
- Class & type: Buffel-class monitor
- Displacement: 2,198 metric tons (2,163 long tons)
- Length: 62.68 m (205 ft 8 in) (o/a)
- Beam: 12.25 m (40 ft 2 in)
- Draught: 4.75 m (15 ft 7 in)
- Installed power: 2,000 ihp (1,500 kW); 4 boilers
- Propulsion: 2 shafts, 2 compound-expansion steam engines
- Speed: 12 knots (22 km/h; 14 mph)
- Complement: 117–159
- Armament: 2 × Armstrong 9-inch (229 mm) rifled muzzle-loading guns; 4 × 30-pounder 4.7 in (120 mm) smoothbore guns
- Armour: Belt: 76–152 mm (3–6 in); Gun turrets: 203–280 mm (8–11 in); Conning tower: 144 mm (5.7 in); Deck: 19–25 mm (0.7–1.0 in)

HNLMS Guinea was an Buffel-class monitor built for the Royal Netherlands Navy in the early 1870s. Rearmed in 1887 with more modern ordnance, she was sold for scrap in 1897.

== Description ==
Guinea was 62.68 meters (205 ft 8 in) long overall with a beam of 12.25 meters (40 ft 2 in). The ship had a draft of 4.75 meters (15 ft 7 in). She displaced 2,198 metric tons (2,163 long tons). Her crew initially consisted of 117 officers and enlisted men, but later increased to 159 crewmen.

The Buffel-class monitors had two 2-cylinder compound-expansion steam engines, each driving a single propeller shaft. Steam for the engines was provided by four boilers and the engines were rated at a total of 2,000 indicated horsepower (1,500 kW) for a designed speed of 12.4 knots (23.0 km/h; 14.3 mph). The ships carried up to 150 metric tons (150 long tons; 170 short tons) of coal, but their range and endurance are unknown.

The Buffel class was initially armed with two Armstrong 9-inch (229 mm) rifled muzzle-loading guns mounted in a single turret and four 30-pounder 4.7-inch (120 mm) smoothbore guns on the deck. In 1887 her armament was modernized. The 9-inch guns were replaced by a single 280-millimeter (11 in) Krupp breech-loading gun and the 30-pounders were superseded by a pair of 75-millimeter (3 in), four quick-firing (QF) 37-millimeter (1.5 in) Hotchkiss guns and two QF 37-millimeter Hotchkiss 5-barrel revolving guns.

The ship had a complete waterline armored belt that ranged in thickness from 152 millimeters (6 in) amidships to 76 millimeters at the ends. The deck armor was 19 to 25 millimeters (0.7 to 1.0 in) thick. The armor of the turret and its supporting structure was generally 203 millimeters (8.0 in) thick, except around the gun ports where it increased to 280 millimeters. The conning tower was protected by 144 millimeters (5.7 in) of armor.

== Construction and career ==
Unlike her sister ship, Buffel, Guinea was built in the Netherlands. She was ordered in 1867 from the Rijkswerf in Amsterdam and was laid down that same year with the name of Matador. Renamed Guinea, after the African colony of Guinea, while under construction, she was launched on 5 May 1870 and completed on 16 October 1873. Guinea was broken up and scrapped at Bolnes in 1897.
