= HNLMS Stier =

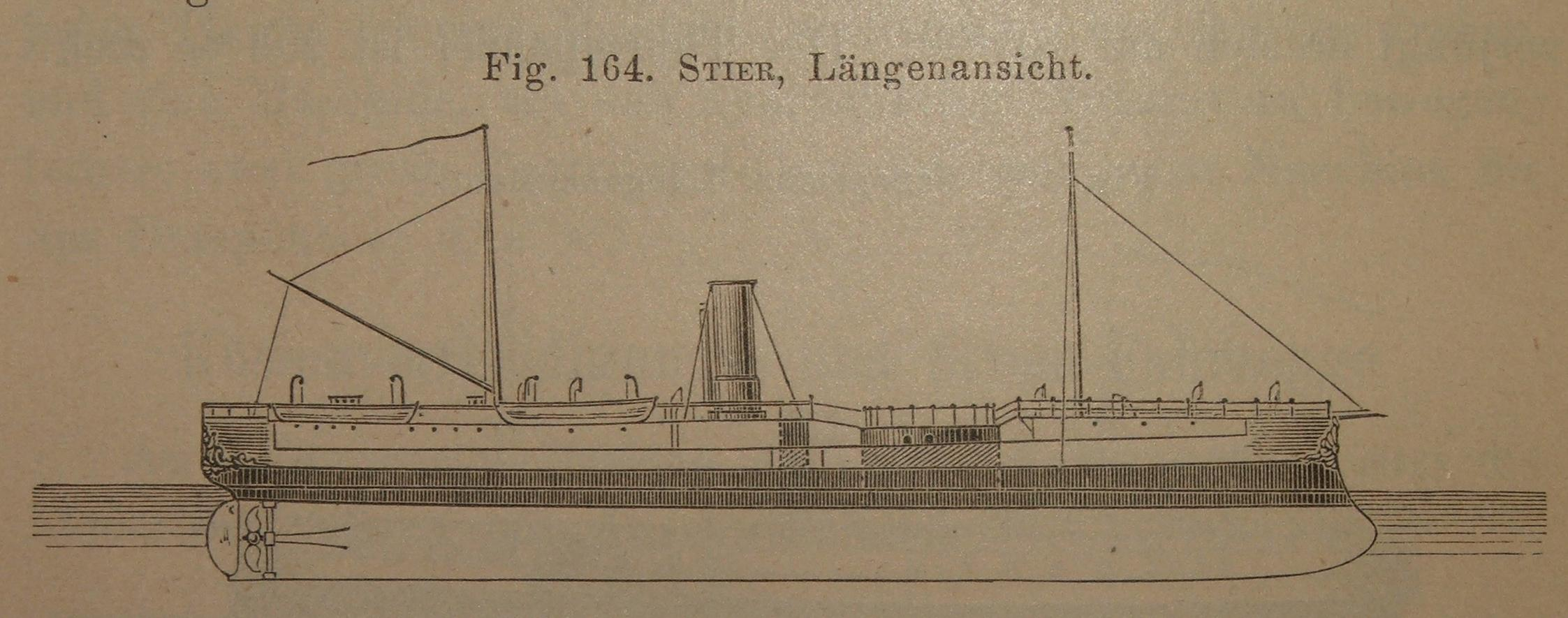
- Stier

History

Netherlands
- Name: Stier
- Namesake: Bull
- Builder: John Laird, Son & Company, Birkenhead, England
- Launched: 5 April 1868
- Recommissioned: 1 April 1909
- Decommissioned: 1982
- In service: 1868
- Out of service: 1906
- Stricken: 1908
- Fate: Scrapped, 1930

General characteristics (as completed)
- Class & type: Schorpioen-class monitor
- Displacement: 2,087 metric tons (2,054 long tons)
- Length: 195.7 ft (59.65 m) (p/p)
- Beam: 39 ft (11.9 m)
- Draught: 16 ft 9 in (5.1 m)
- Installed power: 2,225 ihp (1,659 kW); 4 boilers
- Propulsion: 2 shafts, 2 steam engines
- Speed: 12 knots (22 km/h; 14 mph)
- Range: 1,030 nmi (1,910 km; 1,190 mi) at 10 knots (19 km/h; 12 mph)
- Complement: 136
- Armament: 2 × 1 − Armstrong 9-inch (229 mm) muzzle-loading rifles
- Armour: Belt: 3–6 in (76–152 mm); Gun turrets: 8–11 in (203–279 mm); Deck: .75–1 in (19–25 mm); Conning tower: 5.7 in (144 mm)

HNLMS Stier was a Schorpioen-class monitor built in England for the Royal Netherlands Navy in the 1860s.

== Design and description ==
The Schorpioen-class ships were designed to the same specification, but varied somewhat in details. The dimensions here are for Schorpioen, with her British-built sister ship, Stier, being marginally smaller. They were 205 feet (62.5 m) long overall, had a beam of 38 feet (11.6 m) and a draft of 16 feet 2 inches (4.9 m). They displaced 2,069–2,175 long tons (2,102–2,210 t) and was fitted with a ram bow. Their crew consisted of 110–136 officers and enlisted men.

Stier was powered by a pair of horizontal trunk steam engines, each driving a propeller shaft using steam from four square boilers. The engines produced 2,225–2,250 indicated horsepower (1,659–1,678 kW) and gave the ship a speed of 12 knots (22 km/h; 14 mph). The Schorpioen-class ships carried a maximum of 200 long tons (203 t) of coal that gave them a range of 1,030 nautical miles (1,910 km; 1,190 mi) at a speed of 10 knots (19 km/h; 12 mph). They were also equipped with two pole masts.

The Schorpioens were armed with a pair of Armstrong 9-inch (229 mm) rifled, muzzle-loading guns mounted in the gun turret. The ships had a complete waterline belt of wrought iron that ranged in thickness from 6 inches (152 mm) amidships to 3 inches (76 mm) at the ends of the ships. The gun turret was protected by 8 inches (203 mm) inches of armor and the armor thickness increased to 11 inches (279 mm) around the gun ports. The base of the turret was also protected by 8 inches of armor and the walls of the conning tower were 5.7 inches (144 mm) thick. The deck armor ranged in thickness from 0.75 to 1 inch (19 to 25 mm).
