= Schorpioen-class monitor =

Pair of Dutch Naval ironclad monitors

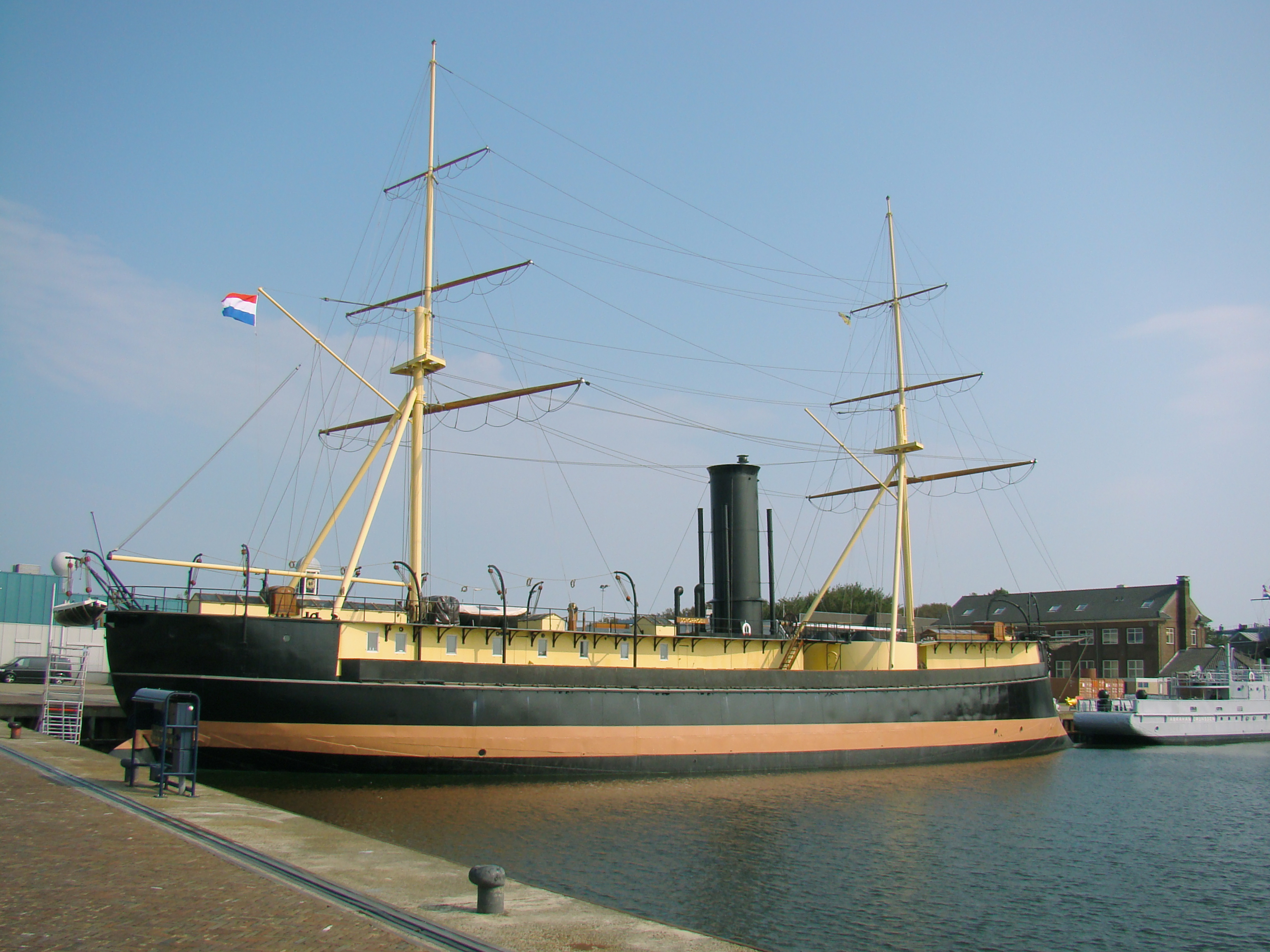
- Schorpioen in Den Helder, Netherlands

Class overview
- Name: Schorpioen class
- Operators: Royal Netherlands Navy
- Preceded by: HNLMS Prins Hendrik der Nederlanden
- Succeeded by: Buffel class
- Built: 1867–1868
- In service: 1867–1908
- In commission: 1868–1982
- Completed: 2
- Scrapped: 1
- Preserved: 1

General characteristics (Schorpioen as completed)
- Class & type: Schorpioen-class monitor
- Displacement: 2,175 long tons (2,210 t)
- Length: 205 ft (62.5 m) (o/a)
- Beam: 38 ft (11.6 m)
- Draught: 16 ft 2 in (4.9 m)
- Installed power: 2,225 ihp (1,659 kW); 4 boilers
- Propulsion: 2 shafts, 2 compound-expansion steam engines
- Speed: 12 knots (22 km/h; 14 mph)
- Range: 1,030 nmi (1,910 km; 1,190 mi) at 10 knots (19 km/h; 12 mph)
- Complement: 136
- Armament: 1 × twin 23 cm Armstrong RML, replaced by: 1 x single 28 cm A No. 1 breechloader
- Armour: Belt: 3–6 in (76–152 mm); Gun turrets: 8–11 in (203–279 mm); Deck: .75–1 in (19–25 mm); Conning tower: 5.7 in (144 mm)

The Schorpioen-class monitors were a pair of ironclad monitors built abroad for the Royal Netherlands Navy in the 1860s. They had uneventful careers and were stricken from the Navy List in the first decade of the 20th century. Stier became a target ship and was sunk in 1925. Schorpioen was converted into an accommodation ship in 1909. She was captured by the Germans during World War 2, but survived the war. She remained in service until 1982 and then became a museum ship.

== Design and description ==
The Schorpioen-class ships were designed to the same specification, but varied somewhat in details. The dimensions here are for Schorpioen, with her British-built sister, Stier, being marginally smaller. The ships were 205 feet (62.5 m) long overall, had a beam of 38 feet (11.6 m) and a draft of 16 feet 2 inches (4.9 m). They displaced 2,069–2,175 long tons (2,102–2,210 t) and was fitted with a ram bow. Their crew consisted of 110–136 officers and enlisted men.

The Schorpioen class were twin-engined ships, with each engine driving one 12.6-foot (3.84 m) propeller. Stier was equipped with horizontal trunk steam engines that used steam from four square boilers. Schorpioen had a pair of two-cylinder compound-expansion steam engines powered by four boilers. Their engines produced 2,225–2,250 indicated horsepower (1,659–1,678 kW) and gave the ships a speed of 12 knots (22 km/h; 14 mph). They carried a maximum of 200 long tons (203 t) of coal that gave them a range of 1,030 nautical miles (1,910 km; 1,190 mi) at a speed of 10 knots (19 km/h; 12 mph). The ships had two pole masts.

The Schorpioens were armed with a pair of Armstrong 9-inch (229 mm) rifled, muzzle-loading guns mounted in the Coles-type gun turret. The ships had a complete waterline belt of wrought iron that ranged in thickness from 6 inches (152 mm) amidships to 3 inches (76 mm) at the ends of the ships. The gun turret was protected by 8 inches (203 mm) inches of armor and the armor thickness increased to 11 inches (279 mm) around the gun ports. The base of the turret was also protected by 8 inches of armor and the walls of the conning tower were 5.7 inches (144 mm) thick. The deck armor ranged in thickness from 0.75 to 1 inch (19 to 25 mm).

== Ships ==
Ship	Builder	Laid down	Launched	Completed
HNLMS Schorpioen	Forges et Chantiers de la Méditerranée, La Seyne-sur-Mer, France	August 1867	18 January 1868	1 October 1868
HNLMS Stier	Laird & Son, Birkenhead, England	7 June 1867	9 April 1868	

== Service ==
The ships had uneventful careers since the Netherlands was at peace during their careers. Stier was stricken in 1908 and later sunk as a target for aircraft in 1925. Schorpioen was sunk at dock when she was accidentally rammed by another ship in 1886. The monitor was refloated and stricken in 1906. She was hulked and converted into an accommodation ship in 1909. The ship was captured by the Germans during World War 2, but survived the war. Schorpioen remained in service until 1982 when she was purchased by a private foundation for restoration as a museum ship in Rotterdam. She was repurchased by the Dutch Navy in 1995 and moved to the Dutch Navy Museum in Den Helder.

== See also ==
- List of ironclads
