= Hellevoetsluis Dry Dock =

Historic dry dock in the Netherlands

- Droogdok Jan Blanken (Dutch)
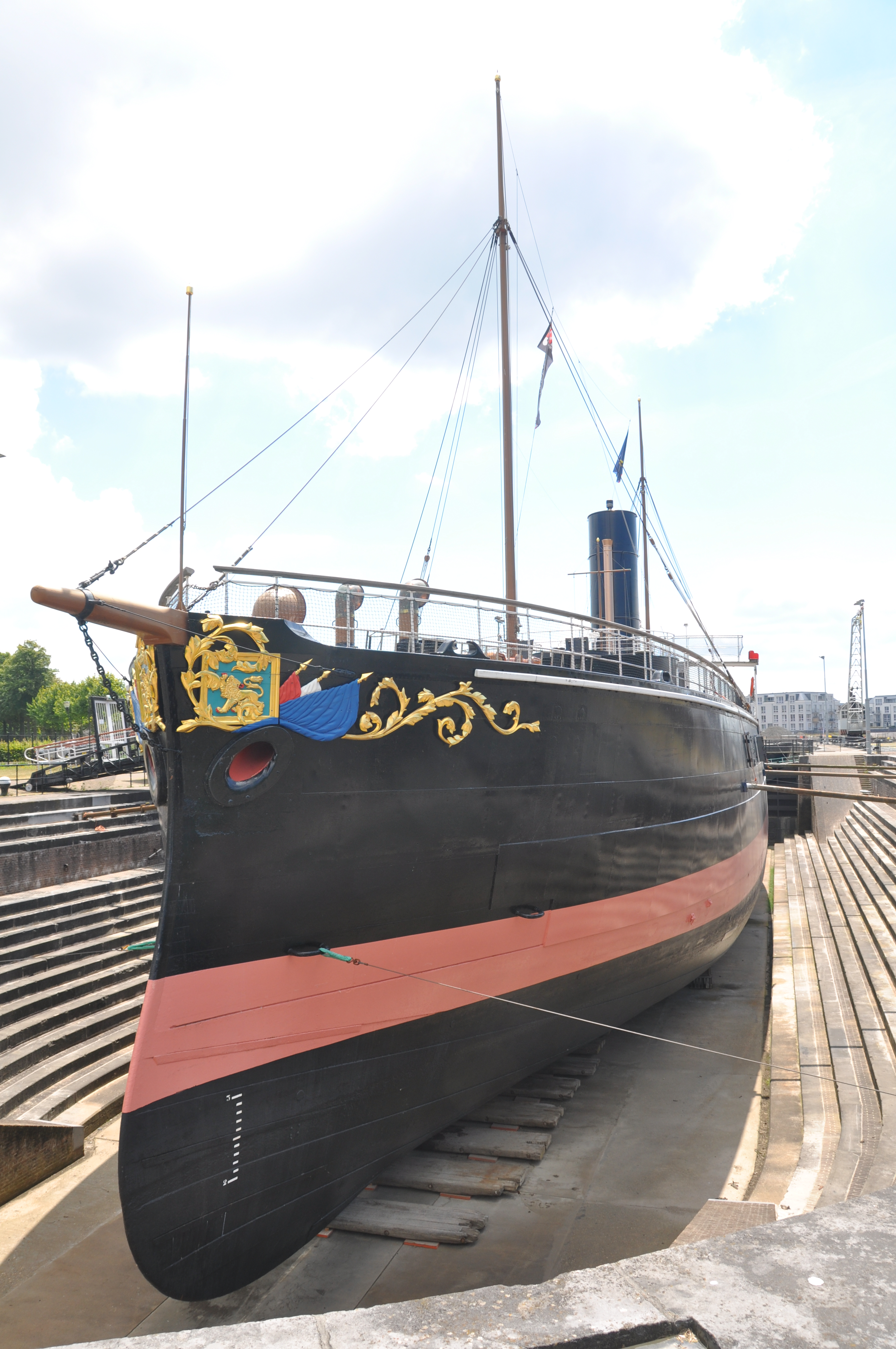
- HNLMS Buffel in the construction dock in 2014
- Interactive map of the Hellevoetsluis Dry Dock area

General information
- Location: Dokweg 5 3221 AE 1, Hellevoetsluis, Netherlands
- Coordinates: 51.828393°N 4.129120°E
- Construction started: 1802 (dry dock); 18?? (construction dock)
- Completed: 1806 (dry dock); 18?? (construction dock)
- Client: Dutch Navy

Design and construction
- Architect: Jan Blanken

Hellevoetsluis Dry Dock is a historic double dry dock in Hellevoetsluis, Netherlands. It was constructed between 1798 and 1822 under the direction of Jan Blanken, and was part of the former Rijkswerf Hellevoetsluis. The dock is one of the rare surviving double dry docks. It is a national monument, and is in operation as part of the maritime attraction 'Dry Dock Jan Blanken', (Droogdok Jan Blanken).

== History ==
=== Hellevoetsluis and the need for a dry dock ===
For a long time, Hellevoetsluis was a naval base for the Admiralty of Rotterdam. When the admiralties were disbanded in 1795, Hellevoetsluis became a base of the Dutch Navy. By that time the fortified town was essentially a large wet dock, a harbor where the tide was kept out by a lock door. This was very beneficial for the preservation of ships. However, from about 1700, ships had become significantly larger. In the late eighteenth century the Dutch had also been unable to ascertain a steady supply of good Scandinavian oak for ships. Both circumstances made that by 1795, the traditional method of maintaining warships by careening them, was no longer effective. What was needed was a dry dock, where warships could be cleaned regularly and easily without damaging them. At the time, the Dutch had Vlissingen Navy Drydock, but since 1746 this had been out of order due to technical problems.

=== Jan Blanken's plan ===
Jan Blanken had proposed a plan for Hellevoetsluis in about 1790. Multiple problems had to be fixed at Hellevoetsluis. One of them was the sea lock, which had become too narrow. That the nearby lands were drained through the dock, was also problematic. After the Batavian Republic was founded, funds became available to restore the navy. In 1796, Jan Blanken published a work about the construction of dry docks in Holland, and especially in Hellevoetsluis. He proposed that steam engines could be used in a dry dock. As an alternative, he proposed that a lock could be used to lift even the heaviest ships to the ebb level, and to construct the dry dock at that height.

=== Construction History ===
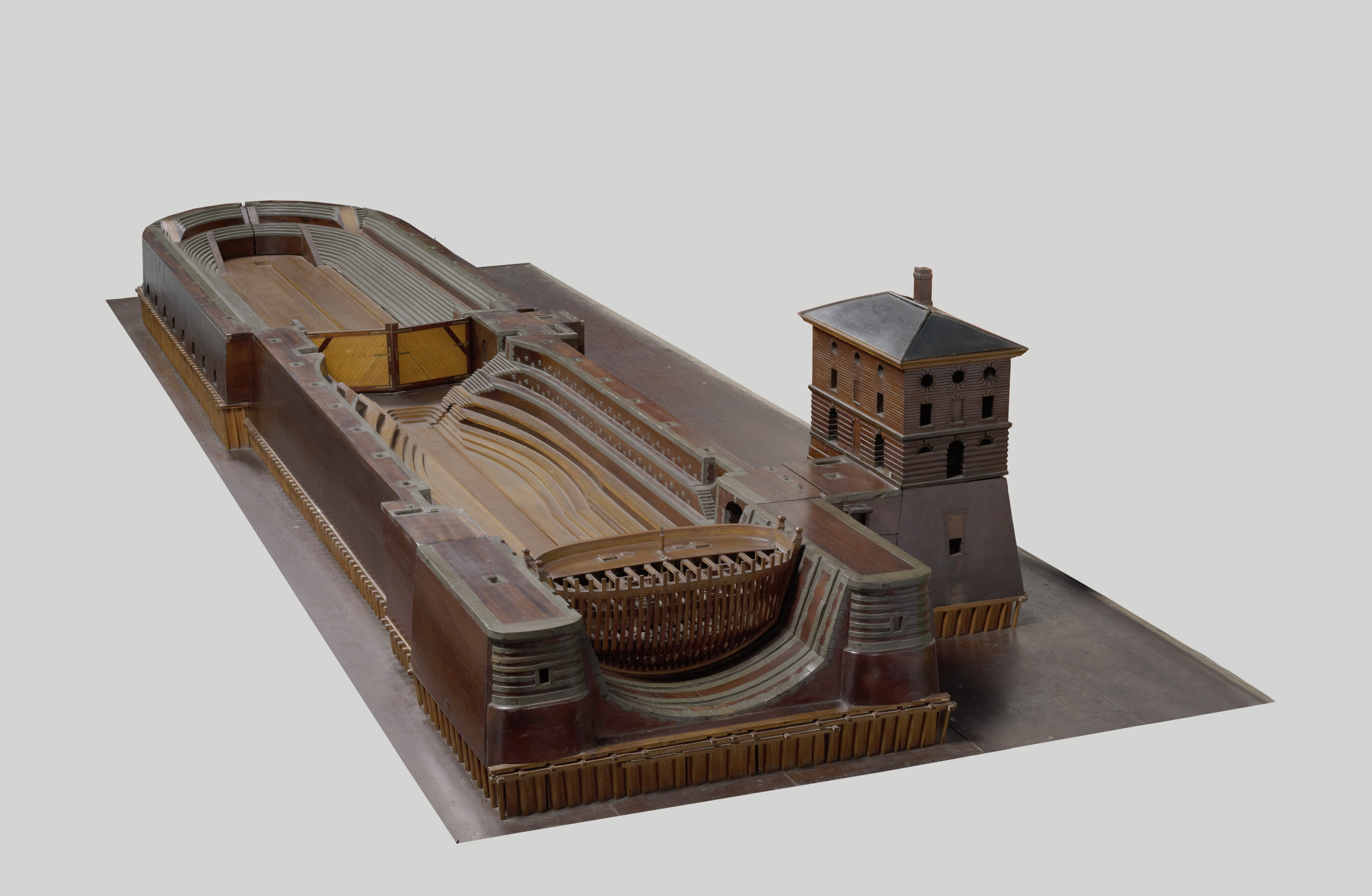
3.16 m long model of the double dry dock

In 1797 construction of a new drainage canal for the polders started, so these no longer had to be drained through the dock. In 1798–1799, the sea lock was widened from 50 to 54 feet, so the latest heavy ships were again able to enter the wet dock.

On 13 July 1799 there was a large tender for building materials for the dry dock. In March 1802 the steam engine of the dry dock was put in use. Its first job was to make the dock of Hellevoetsluis dry. This was done in 3.5 days. In 1725 this had taken 2–3 months and 50 horses. One can assume that making the dock dry was done to build the entrance of the dry dock, which would hold the caisson door.

By fall 1802 the foundations of the dock were ready. On 29 September 1802 a marble stone with inscription was put in place as first stone of the dock. On 17 April 1806 the dry dock was closed by placing the caisson door. On 13 September 1806 the dock was opened by bringing in the frigate Euridice.

In August 1812 there was a tender for the final completion of the construction dock inrigting van aanbouw. After the liberation this probably lost priority. By 1821 the floor of the construction dock was to be tendered in September 1821. By 1823 the dry dock had been completed.

== Dock characteristics ==
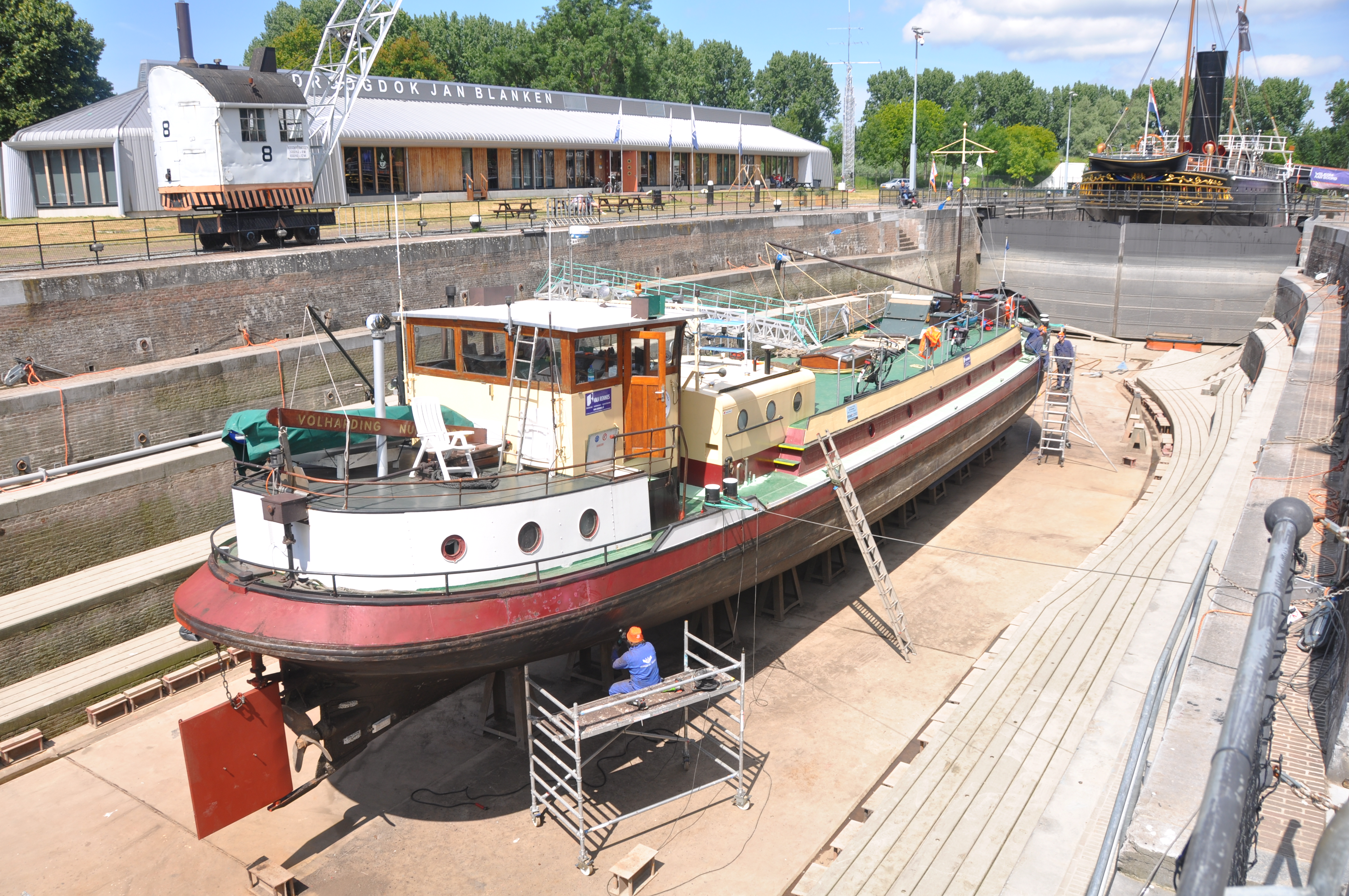
A ship in the dry dock with Buffel in the construction dock

=== Foundation ===
For the foundation of the dock, hundreds of piles were driven into the ground to create a deep foundation. This foundation needs to support the ships when they are in dock, and when it's empty it needs to keep the ground floor in place against groundwater, that pushes the floor upwards.

=== Dry dock and Construction dock ===
Hellevoetsluis Dry dock consists of two parts. The part closest to the wet dock, and separated from it by a caisson door, is the deepest. It was meant to be a real dry dock, i.e. ships were to use it for only a limited amount of time. E.g. for inspections, or cleaning, which did not take more than a couple of days. As such it provided an alternative to careening.

The construction dock is behind the 'proper' dry dock, and separated from it by lock doors. It is shallower, and therefore more expensive to operate. Bigger ships have to be lifted above the flood level in order to use it. (The dry dock then operates as a lock) Its operation also requires it to wait for the dry dock proper not to hamper it. Therefore, the construction dock was used for more extensive (lengthier) repairs, or building new ships. In such circumstances the higher operation cost were less relevant. In spite of its name, the construction dock is also a regular dry dock.

=== Dimensions ===
In about 1880, the dimensions of the dry dock were given as 71 m long, with an entrance at Amsterdam Ordnance Datum water level of 15.90 m wide. The blocks were 0.75 m high. If water was 0.1 m above AOD, the caisson door could be opened, and a ship with a draft of 4.45 m could enter the dock. This was not counting the tide. The fact that the dry dock nowadays serves ships of 3.75 m draft at +0 m AOD, suggest that the block height of 75 cm still had to be deducted from the 4.45 m, leading to a possible draft for docking ships of 3.70 m without tide in 1880.

The construction dock was given as 70.4 m long. At AOD + 0.1 m a ship with a draft of 2.65 m fore and 2.95 m aft could dock. The floor of the construction dock is almost 1 m above the floor of the dry dock, making it easy to keep the construction dock dry. These docking depths also did not take the tide into account, nor the dry dock operating as a lock. (This is how HNLMS Buffel was put in the construction dock)

In 1880, the high tide water level was 0.75 m higher than AOD, and at spring tide the water level was again 1–2 m higher. Therefore, about 0.7 m would have to be added again to the 3.7 m to get a regular draft of 4.4 m for ships willing to enter the dry dock at high tide. Nowadays the Haringvlietdam blocks most of the tide from reaching Hellevoetsluis.

=== The Caisson Door ===
A caisson door was used to close the dry dock. Such a ship caisson or bateau-porte was a French invention. It had been used for the first time in the Netherlands in the dock of Medemblik. On 17 April 1806 a like ship door was launched in Hellevoetsluis, and placed to close the dry dock. The first Hellevoetsluis caisson door was made of wood. In the 1880s it was replaced by one made of riveted iron. This was tendered on 30 July 1884. It is still in use.

=== Pump House ===
A steam engine was bought to provide the power for emptying the dry dock. It was secretly bought from Boulton and Watt in Birmingham for 15,000 guilders. It arrived in 1801 and was placed in a pump house. The pump house was demolished in 1968, but was rebuilt according to the original design in 2001.

== Service ==
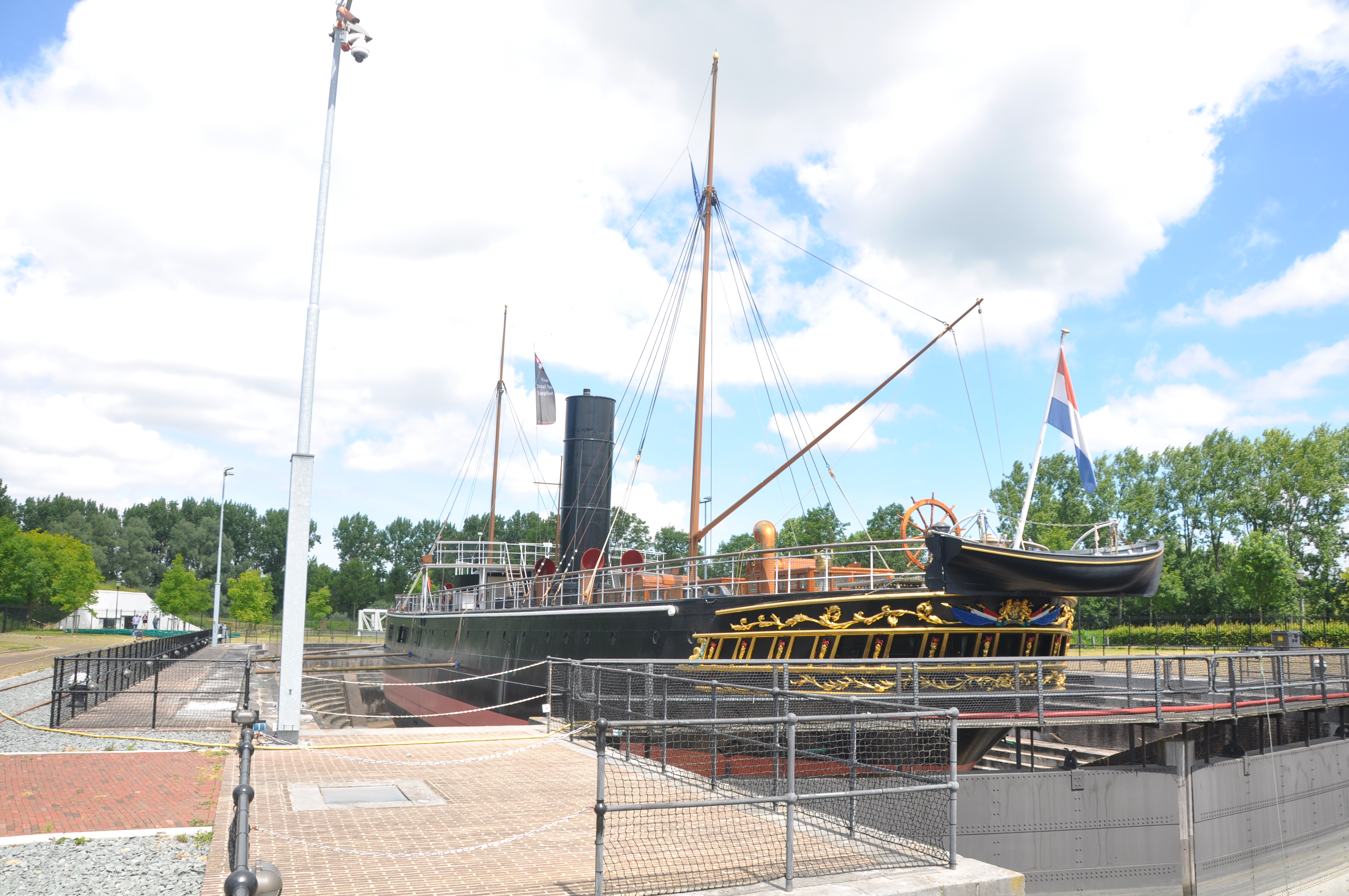
Buffel in the construction dock

=== Ships using the dry dock ===
The sailing frigate Euridice of 36 guns commanded by Captain Buyskens, was the first ship to be docked in the dry dock on 13 September 1806. The docking was delayed for a day by trouble with the steam engine, but by early morning on 16 September she was out again.

According to De Jonge, the second ship to use the dry dock was Koninklijke Hollander of 90 guns. The third ship to use the dry dock was the ship of the line Chatham of 90 guns. This proved that the dock could also handle the largest ships of the time. The Dutch Navy was enthusiastic about the dry dock at Hellevoetsluis. It was claimed that by not having to careen these three ships, 25,000-30,000 guilders had been saved, not counting the damage that careening would have done to these ships.

On 4 October 1811 Napoleon brought a surprise visit to the dock. Later in 1811 Jan Blanken got the assignment to build a large naval base near Nieuwediep, Den Helder, later called Willemsoord It would include another dry dock. This dry dock that was later called Willemsoord Dry Dock I was constructed between 1812 and 1822. However, it would suffer much more trouble than the Hellevoetsluis dry dock.

=== Dry dock for smaller ships ===
For about 50 years after it was opened, Hellevoetsluis Dry Dock could meet almost any demand of the Dutch navy. By the 1850s, this changed. The new steam frigates could not be docked in Hellevoetsluis. In general, all ships with a draft of more than 5.2-5.3 m had trouble using the dry dock. This prompted people bent on economizing, to propose the closure of Hellevoetsluis Dry Dock (and the whole naval base), as soon the second dry dock in Willemsoord would be finished.

In May 1867 Willemsoord Dry Dock II was finally finished, but at horrendous cost. By then, the Dutch government had decided to close Vlissingen Naval Base. The fact that the old dry dock in Vlissingen had by then also become too small for the latest ships might have played its part.

=== Commercial use ===
After the navy left Hellevoetsluis, the dry dock was exploited by a private industry. It served as such till the 1970s.

=== Current status ===
In 1972 the dry dock became a national monument. In 2005 it was restored to its former glory. A foundation maintains it, and uses it for servicing small ships. Most of the time these are small historic ships that contribute to the experience of tourists visiting Hellevoetsluis. The docking of the ironclad HNLMS Buffel in the construction dock was of course most scenic.

Visitors can follow a tour through the upper tunnels around the dock. These were used to empty the dock, but are no longer used as such. The tunnels around the lower level are still in use.

== Gallery ==
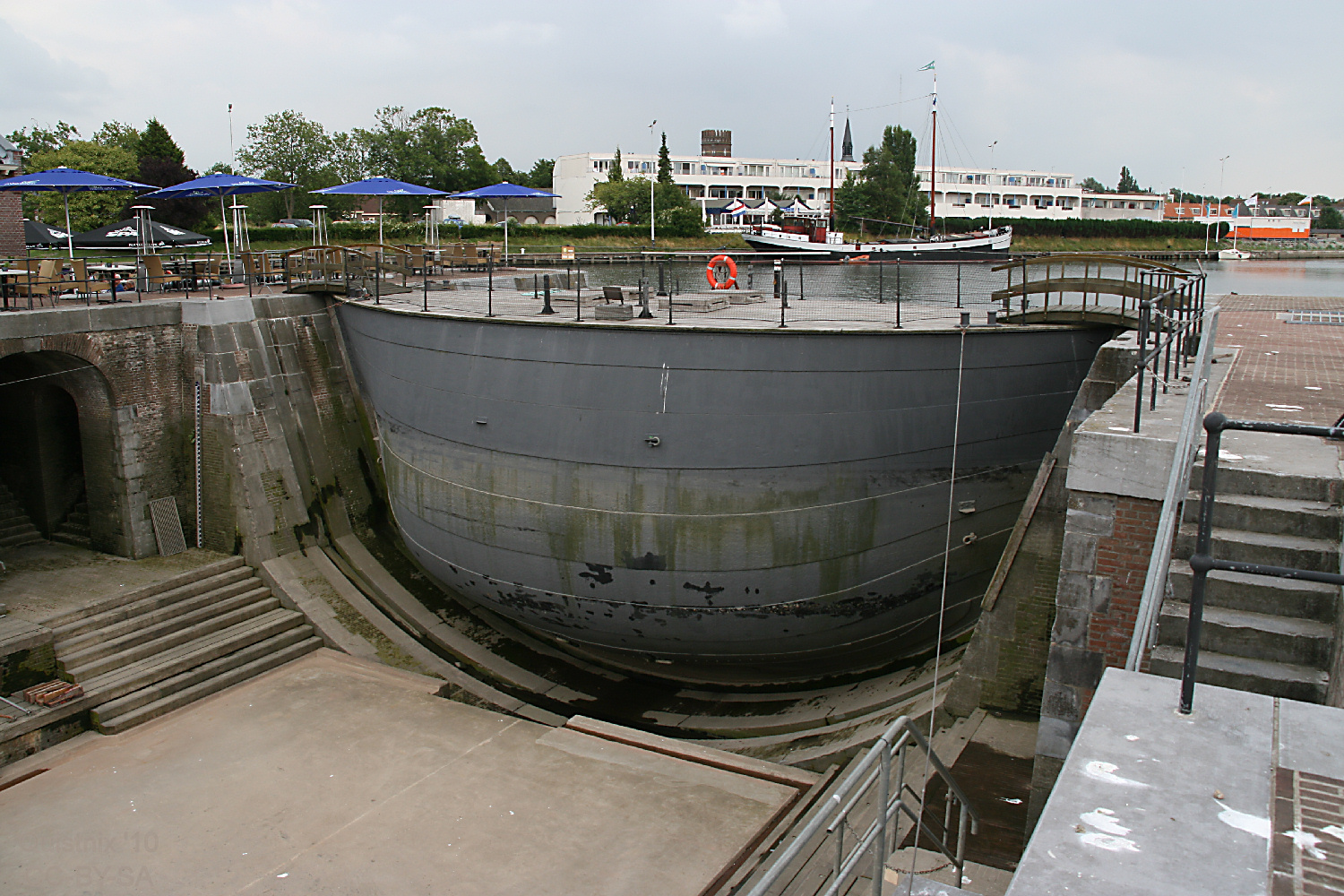
Schip caisson

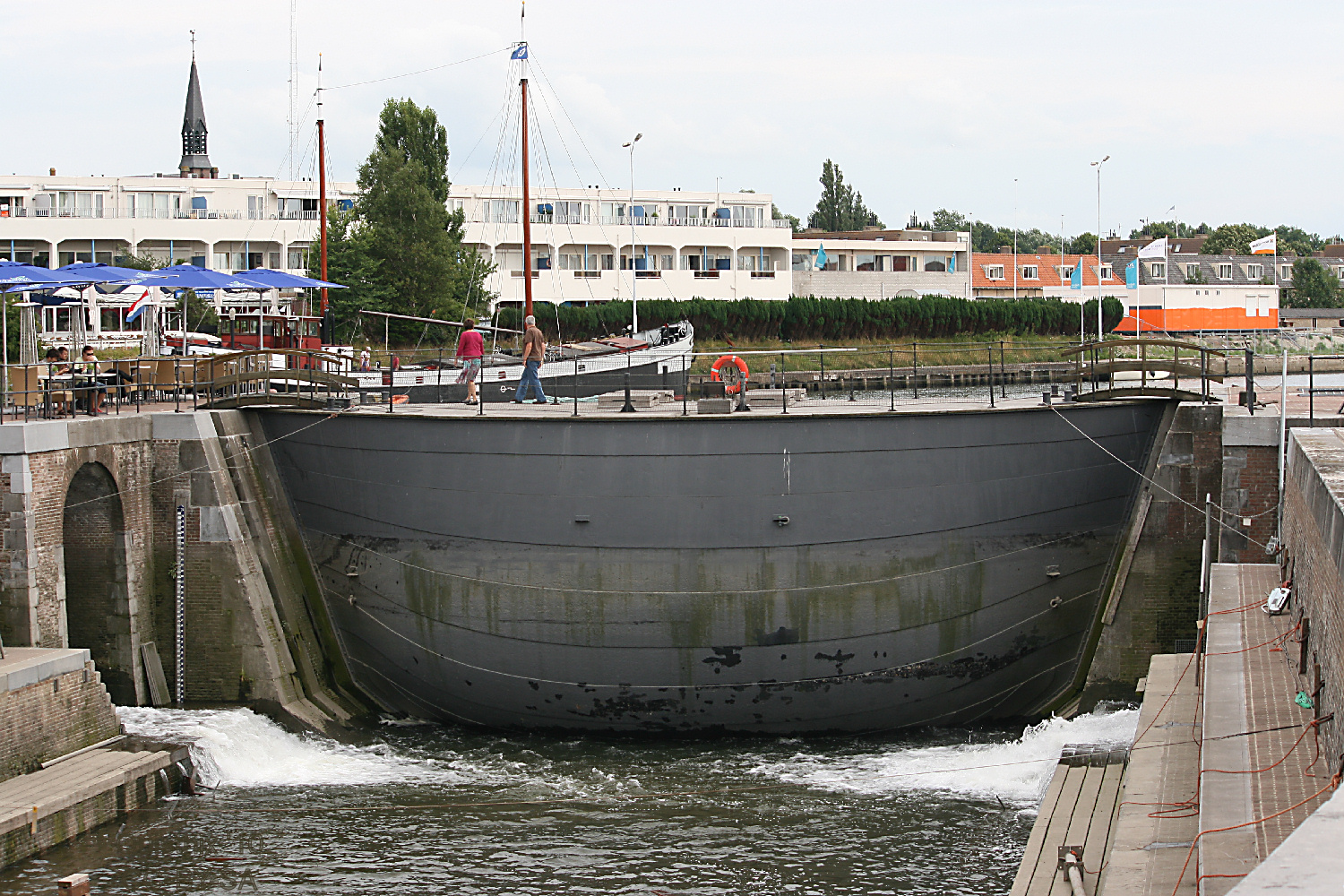
Water enters the dry dock

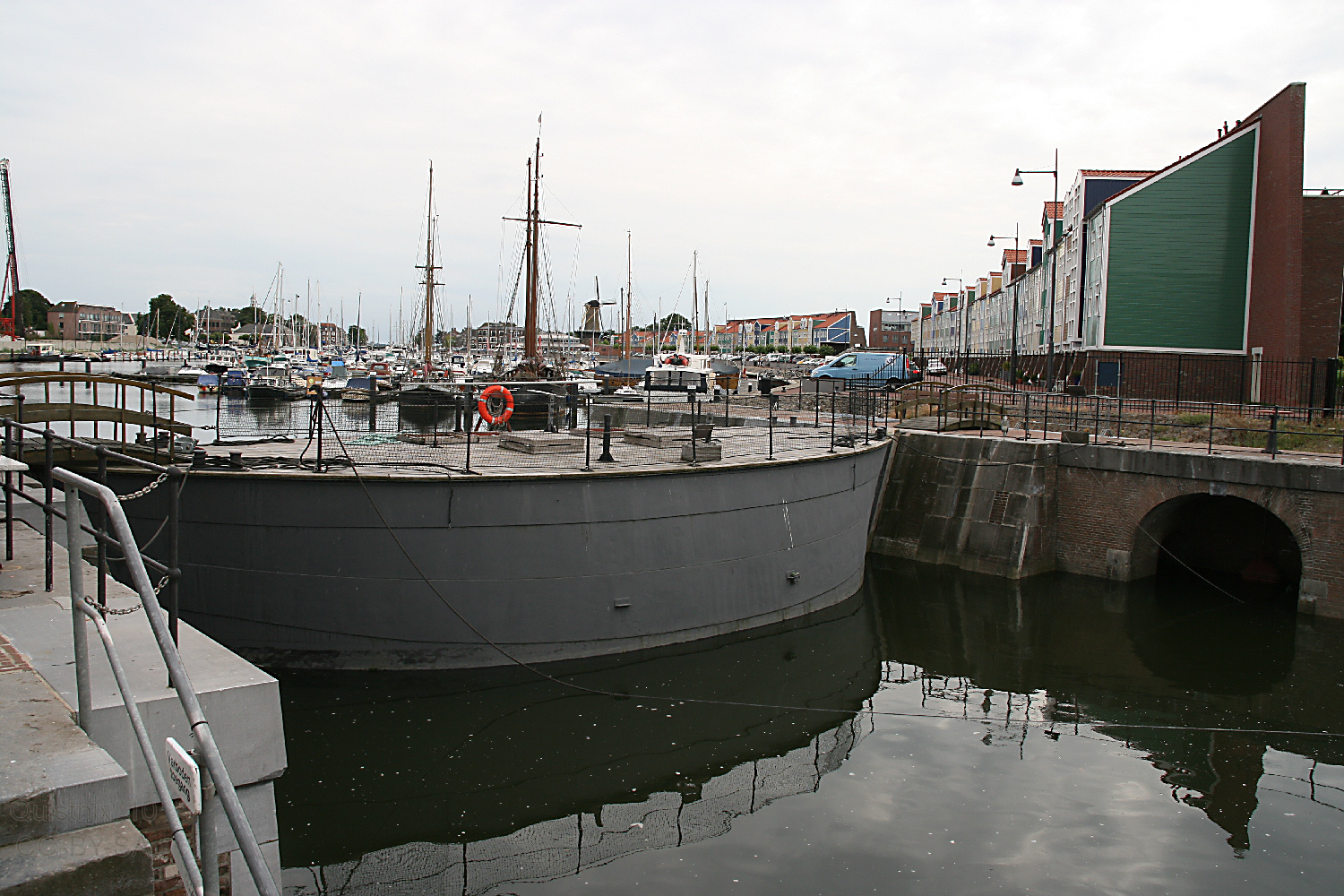
The dry dock has been filled up

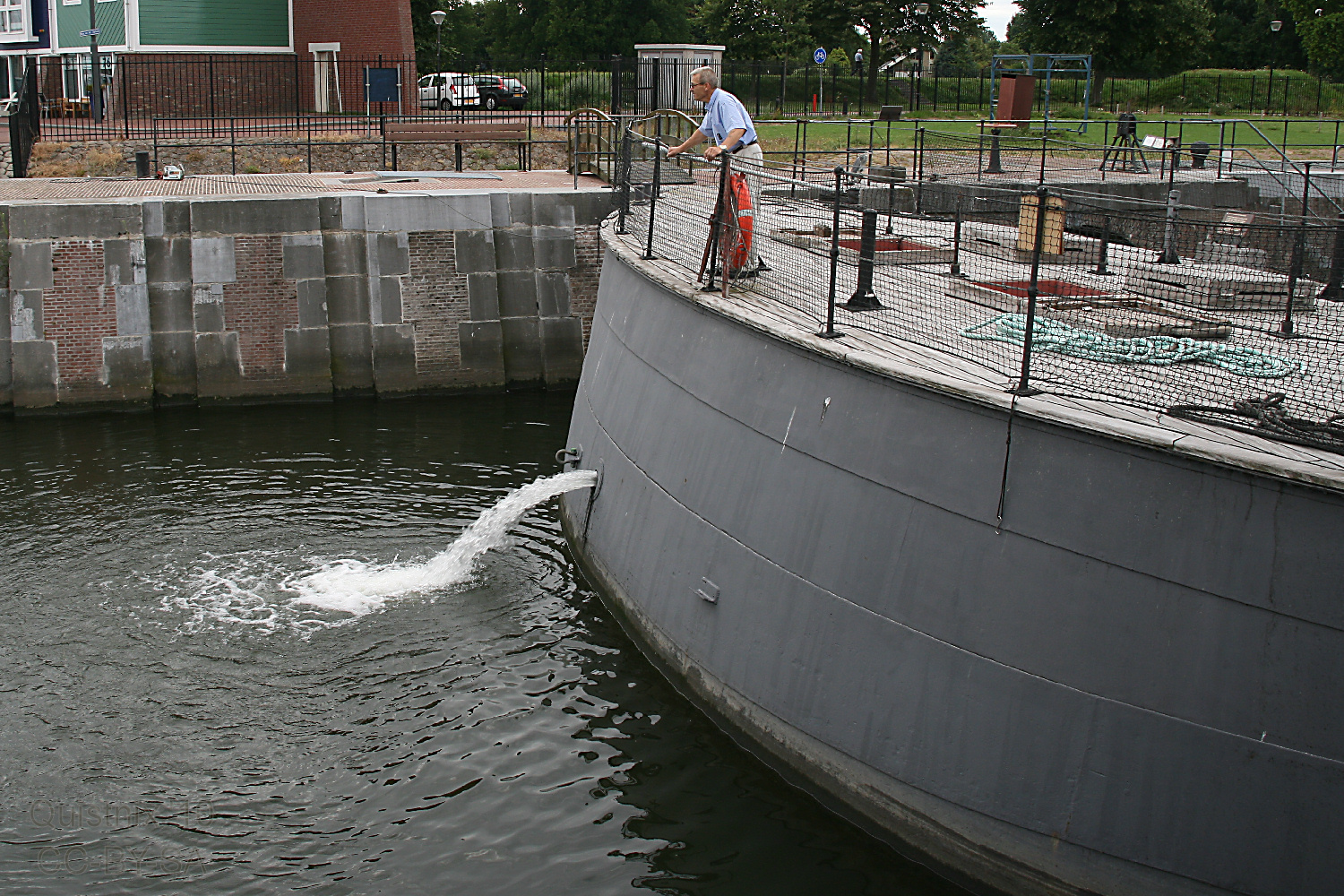
Emptying the ship caisson

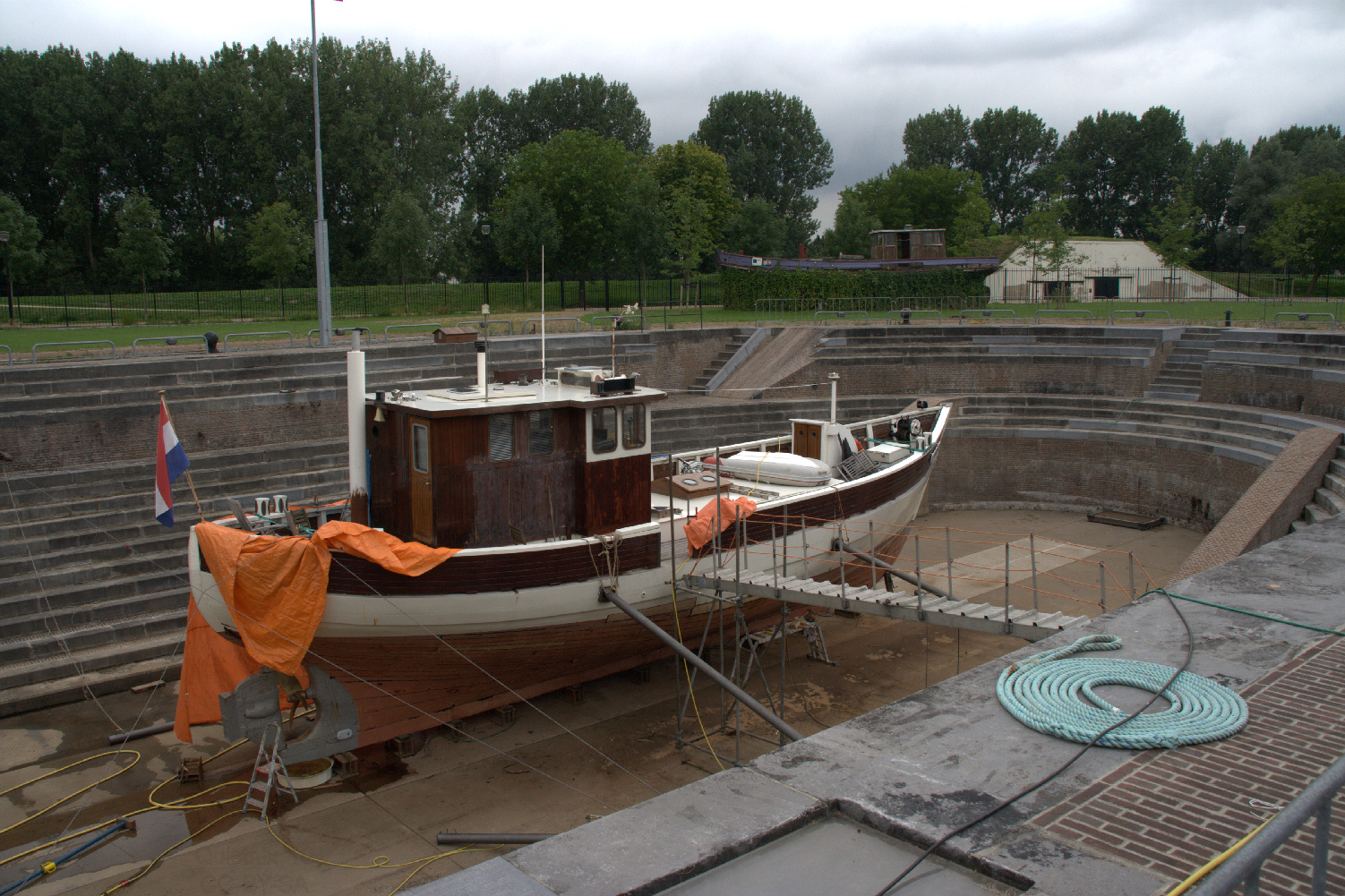
Ship in the emptied dock
