= Buffel-class monitor =

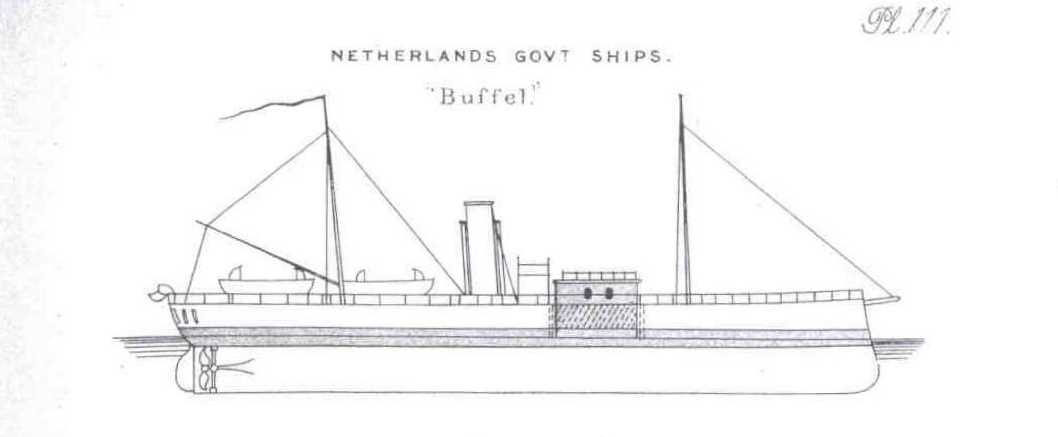
- Right elevation line drawing of the Buffel class

Class overview
- Name: Buffel class
- Operators: Royal Netherlands Navy
- Preceded by: Schorpioen class
- Succeeded by: Heiligerlee class
- Built: 1867–1870
- In service: 1869–1908
- Completed: 2
- Scrapped: 1
- Preserved: 1

General characteristics (as completed)
- Type: Monitor
- Displacement: 2,198 long tons (2,233 t)
- Length: 205 ft 8 in (62.7 m) (o/a)
- Beam: 40 ft 4 in (12.3 m)
- Draught: 15 ft 9 in (4.8 m)
- Installed power: 2,000 ihp (1,500 kW); 4 boilers
- Propulsion: 2 shafts, 2 compound-expansion steam engines
- Speed: 11 knots (20 km/h; 13 mph)
- Complement: 117, later 159
- Armament: 1 × twin 23 cm Armstrong RML, replaced by: 1 x single 28 cm A No. 1 breechloader; 4 × single 30-pdr smoothbore guns
- Armour: Belt: 3–6 in (76–152 mm); Gun turrets: 8–11 in (203–279 mm); Deck: 0.75–1 in (19–25 mm); Conning tower: 5.7 in (144 mm)

The Buffel-class monitors were a pair of ironclad monitors built for the Royal Netherlands Navy in the 1860s. They had uneventful careers and were stricken from the Navy List in the late 1890s. Guinea was scrapped in 1897, but Buffel was hulked and converted into an accommodation ship in 1896. She was captured by the Germans during World War II, but survived the war. She became a museum ship in 1979.

== Design and description ==
The Buffel-class ships were designed to the same specification as the Schorpioen class. The ships were 205 feet 8 inches (62.7 m) long overall, had a beam of 40 feet 4 inches (12.3 m) and a draft of 15 feet 9 inches (4.8 m). They displaced 2,198 long tons (2,233 t) and was fitted with a ram bow. Their crew initially consisted of 117 officers and enlisted men and then later increased to 159.

The ships had a pair of two-cylinder compound-expansion steam engines, each driving one 12.0-foot (3.66 m) propeller, using steam from four boilers. The engines were designed to produce a total of 2,000 indicated horsepower (1,500 kW) and give the ships a speed of 12.4 knots (23.0 km/h; 14.3 mph). They could only reach 11.2 knots (20.7 km/h; 12.9 mph), however. The Buffels carried a maximum of 150 long tons (152 t) of coal and had two pole masts.

The Buffel-class monitors were armed with a pair of Armstrong 9-inch (229 mm) rifled, muzzle-loading guns mounted in the Coles-type gun turret. They were also equipped with four 30-pounder smoothbore guns. The ships had a complete waterline belt of wrought iron that ranged in thickness from 6 inches (152 mm) amidships to 3 inches (76 mm) at the ends of the ships. The gun turret was protected by 8 inches (203 mm) inches of armor and the armor thickness increased to 11 inches (279 mm) around the gun ports. The base of the turret was also protected by 8 inches of armor and the walls of the conning tower were 5.7 inches (144 mm) thick. The deck armor ranged in thickness from 0.75 to 1 inch (19 to 25 mm).

== Ships ==
| Ship | Builder | Laid down | Launched | Completed |
|---|---|---|---|---|
| HNLMS Buffel | Robert Napier and Sons, Glasgow, Scotland | 10 June 1867 | 10 March 1868 | 22 July 1869 |
| HNLMS Guinea | Rijkswerf, Amsterdam | 1867 | 5 May 1870 | 16 October 1873 |

== Service ==
The Dutch bought a license for the design of Buffel from Napier and built one sister ship in their own dockyard in Amsterdam. The ships had uneventful careers since the Netherlands was at peace during their active periods. Buffel was stricken in 1896 and became an accommodation ship on 11 June of that year. She was captured by the Germans during World War II, but survived the war. She became a museum ship in 1979 in the Maritime Museum Rotterdam. Guinea was stricken and sold for scrap in 1897.

== See also ==
- List of ironclads
