= Tine Buffel =

Sociologist and social gerontologist

Tine Buffel is a sociologist and social gerontologist at the University of Manchester, where she is Professor of Sociology and Social Gerontology and founding director of the Manchester Urban Ageing Research Group (MUARG). Her research focuses on urban ageing, age-friendly cities and communities, inequalities in later life, and participatory research with older people. She was elected a Fellow of the Academy of Social Sciences in 2024.

== Education and career ==
Buffel received a master's degree in Adult Educational Sciences from Vrije Universiteit Brussel (VUB) in 2006, completing a thesis on the educational function of socio-cultural adult work. She subsequently worked at VUB as a doctoral researcher, research associate, and lecturer in Educational Sciences before joining the University of Manchester in 2012. She is also a guest professor in Educational Sciences at VUB.

Buffel is a member of the World Health Organization Technical Advisory Group for Measurement, Monitoring and Evaluation of the UN Decade of Healthy Ageing.

== Research ==
Buffel's research has focused on the relationship between ageing and urban change. In a 2012 article with Chris Phillipson and Thomas Scharf, she examined the age-friendly city model in the context of competing commercial, political, and social interests. Buffel and Phillipson later considered the effects of globalisation, urban regeneration, and austerity on age-friendly policies. Her work has addressed inequalities within age-friendly programmes, including differences between affluent and disadvantaged urban communities.

Buffel has also used participatory methods in which older residents take part as co-researchers. In 2018, she published research from a Manchester project in which 18 older residents were trained as co-researchers and interviewed people experiencing social isolation. Older residents were involved in the design, implementation, and analysis of the research, and some continued to campaign on neighbourhood issues, including the restoration of a local bus service. MUARG has continued to use co-research methods and to work with local and regional policymakers in Manchester.

Buffel co-edited Age-Friendly Cities and Communities: A Global Perspective with Sophie Handler and Phillipson in 2018. The volume brought together research on age-friendly policies and projects in Europe, Asia, and Australia, including the involvement of older people in developing age-friendly communities.

With Phillipson, Buffel wrote Ageing in Place in Urban Environments: Critical Perspectives, published in 2023, which examined ageing in place in relation to urbanisation, gentrification, housing, and inequality. In 2024, Buffel, Patty Doran, and Sophie Yarker edited Reimagining Age-Friendly Communities: Urban Ageing and Spatial Justice, which focused on urban inequality, co-production, and spatial justice in age-friendly communities.

In 2025, Buffel and Phillipson examined community-based approaches to ageing in place, including village organisations, naturally occurring retirement communities, cohousing, and compassionate communities. Their research considered the infrastructure, local services, and community support needed to enable older people to remain in their homes and neighbourhoods, particularly in disadvantaged areas.

== Public engagement ==
In March 2025, Buffel gave a plenary address at the Age-Friendly Futures Summit in Manchester on inequalities affecting older people living in areas of multiple deprivation. The summit was co-hosted by the University of Manchester and Manchester Metropolitan University in partnership with the World Health Organization, the Greater Manchester Combined Authority, and the Centre for Ageing Better.

== Recognition ==
The Researching Age-friendly Neighbourhoods project, on which Buffel was a researcher, received the National Co-ordinating Centre for Public Engagement's Engage Award in the Working in Partnership category in 2016. Buffel was elected a Fellow of the Academy of Social Sciences in 2024. In 2026, MUARG received the Team Achievement Award at the Vivensa Academy Excellence Awards.

== Selected works ==
- Buffel, Tine; Phillipson, Chris; Scharf, Thomas (2012). "Ageing in urban environments: Developing 'age-friendly' cities". Critical Social Policy. 32 (4): 597–617. doi:10.1177/0261018311430457.
- Buffel, Tine; Phillipson, Chris (2016). "Can global cities be 'age-friendly cities'? Urban development and ageing populations". Cities. 55: 94–100. doi:10.1016/j.cities.2016.03.016.
- Buffel, Tine (2018). "Social research and co-production with older people: Developing age-friendly communities". Journal of Aging Studies. 44: 52–60. doi:10.1016/j.jaging.2018.01.012.
- Buffel, Tine; Handler, Sophie; Phillipson, Chris, eds. (2018). Age-Friendly Cities and Communities: A Global Perspective. Bristol: Policy Press.
- Buffel, Tine; Phillipson, Chris (2023). Ageing in Place in Urban Environments: Critical Perspectives. Abingdon: Routledge.
- Buffel, Tine; Doran, Patty; Yarker, Sophie, eds. (2024). Reimagining Age-Friendly Communities: Urban Ageing and Spatial Justice. Bristol: Policy Press.
- Buffel, Tine; Phillipson, Chris (2025). "Ageing in place in urban environments: Building collaborative organisations for later life". European Journal of Ageing. 22: 47. doi:10.1007/s10433-025-00875-9. PMC 12440835.
