= Ship cradle =

Rig to hold a ship upright on dry land

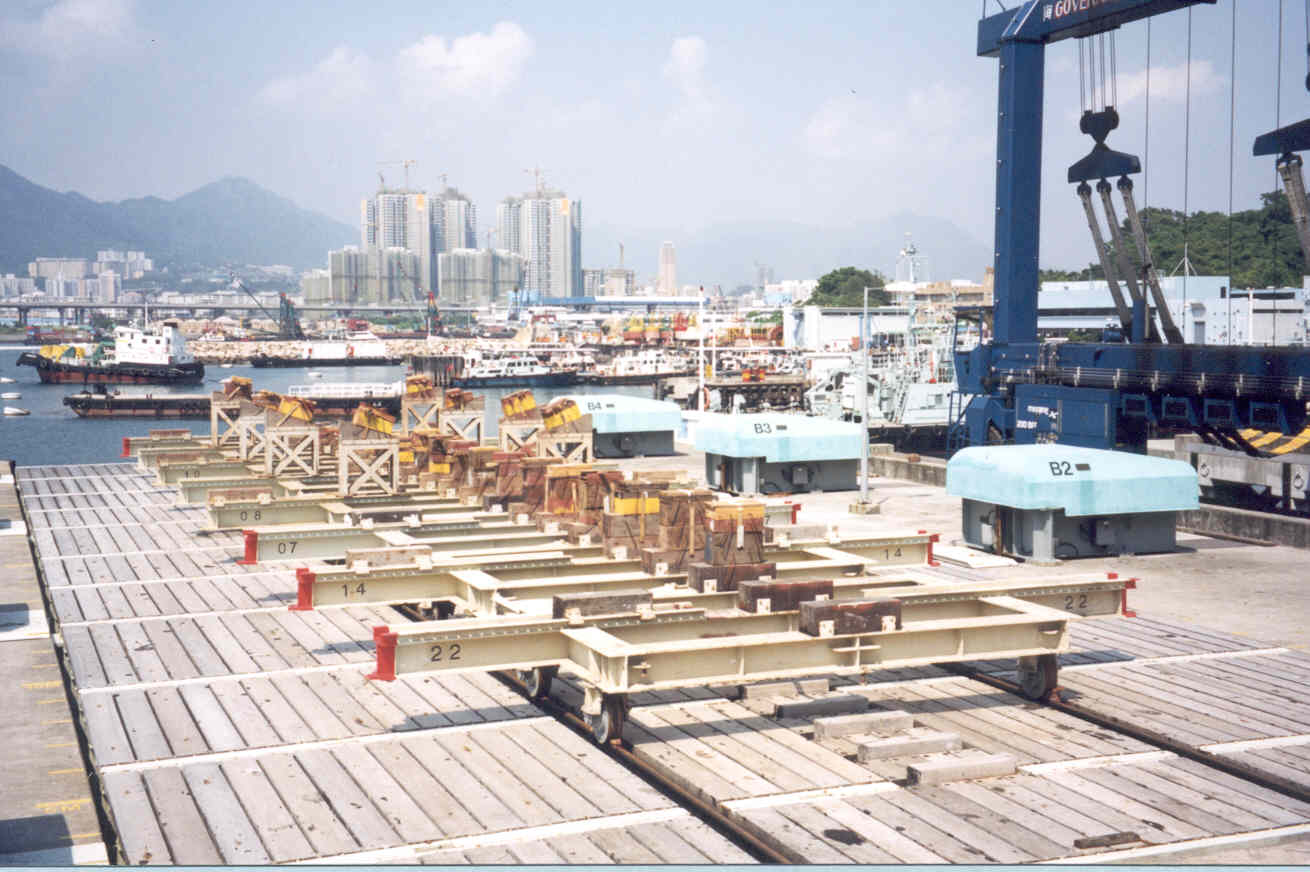
Empty ship cradle on steel rails

A ship cradle is a rig designed to hold a ship or boat upright on dry land to allow the vessel to be built or repaired. The vessel is held in place in the cradle by wooden chocks, cables, sand bags or restraining fixtures on the cradle. Ship cradles are made of timber or steel and are usually built adjacent the seashore, lake or river side or on the floor of a dry dock.

== Overview ==
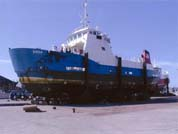
The Shetland ferry, MV Bigga, in its cradle

"Cradle" may refer to the whole rig or sometimes each section of it. The cradle may be fixed to the dock floor, relying on the tides or a dry dock to drain it, or be equipped with wheels, running on an inclined track to allow the ship to be moved out of the water to a dry parking area. Large or heavy ships require steel railway wheels running on fixed steel tracks; cradles designed for smaller boats may have rubber-tyred wheels, usually running on a concrete slipway, and can be moved anywhere in the boatyard.

== Movement ==
Most cradles with steel wheels can move only in one direction, following the cradle rail track and designed to lift the vessel out of the water either longitudinally (bow-stern) or transversely (across the beam). The empty cradle shown top right extracts the ship longitudinally but its wheels can then be rotated 90^{o} allowing it to park the ship transversely and freeing up the slipway for another vessel. The ferry bottom right can also be transported in the longitudinal as well as the transverse direction but uses a separate transverse carriage to change direction.
