= HNLMS Schorpioen =

19th century Royal Netherlands Navy ship

Coordinates: 52.96242°N 4.77206°E

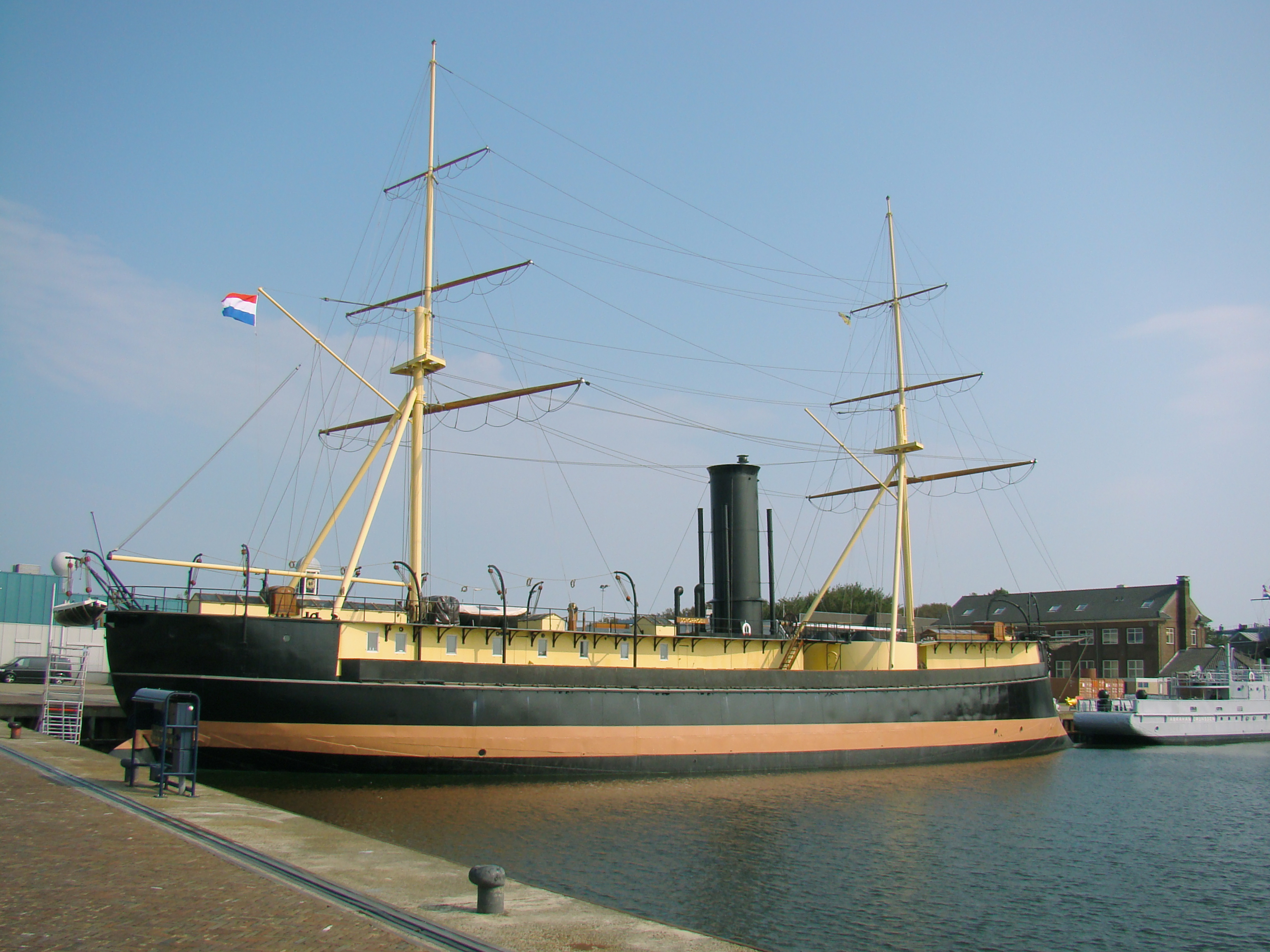
- Schorpioen in Den Helder, Netherlands

History

Netherlands
- Name: Schorpioen
- Namesake: Scorpion
- Builder: Forges et Chantiers de la Méditerranée, La Seyne-sur-Mer, France
- Laid down: August 1867
- Launched: 18 January 1868
- Completed: 1 October 1868
- Commissioned: 1868
- Decommissioned: 1 April 1909
- Reclassified: As an accommodation hulk, 1 April 1909
- Home port: Den Helder
- Captured: May 1940

Germany
- Acquired: May 1940
- Captured: 8 May 1945
- Fate: Returned to Netherlands

Netherlands
- Name: Schorpioen
- Acquired: 8 May 1945
- Recommissioned: 18 May 1947
- Decommissioned: 1982
- Stricken: 1982
- Home port: Den Helder
- Identification: HW-5, 1947; A-882, 1954
- Status: Museum ship, 1982

General characteristics (as completed)
- Class & type: Schorpioen-class monitor
- Displacement: 2,175 metric tons (2,141 long tons)
- Length: 195.7 ft (59.65 m) (p/p)
- Beam: 39 ft (11.9 m)
- Draught: 15 ft 10 in (4.8 m)
- Installed power: 2,225 ihp (1,659 kW); 4 boilers
- Propulsion: 2 shafts, 2 steam engines
- Speed: 12 knots (22 km/h; 14 mph)
- Range: 1,030 nmi (1,910 km; 1,190 mi) at 10 knots (19 km/h; 12 mph)
- Complement: 136
- Armament: 2 × 1 − Armstrong 9-inch (229 mm) muzzle-loading rifles
- Armour: Belt: 3–6 in (76–152 mm); Gun turrets: 8–11 in (203–279 mm); Deck: .75–1 in (19–25 mm); Conning tower: 5.7 in (144 mm)

HNLMS Schorpioen is a Schorpioen-class monitor built in France for the Royal Netherlands Navy in the 1860s. These new ships were equipped with heavy rifled 23 cm (9 in) guns, and a heavy armor. The hull had an armor plated belt of 15 cm (6 in) and the gun turret, housing the two guns, had almost 30 cm (12 in) of armor.

She came from the building yard with two tripod masts and able to employ about 600 m^{2} (6,500 sq ft) of sails, but she proved to be a difficult sailing ship and some years later the yards, masts and the sails were removed. As with Buffel her huge steam engines gave her a maximum speed of 13 knots (24 km/h; 15 mph). Her striking weapon was the pointed ram bow, slightly different from Buffel's, but she never ever used this overestimated weapon.

== Service record ==
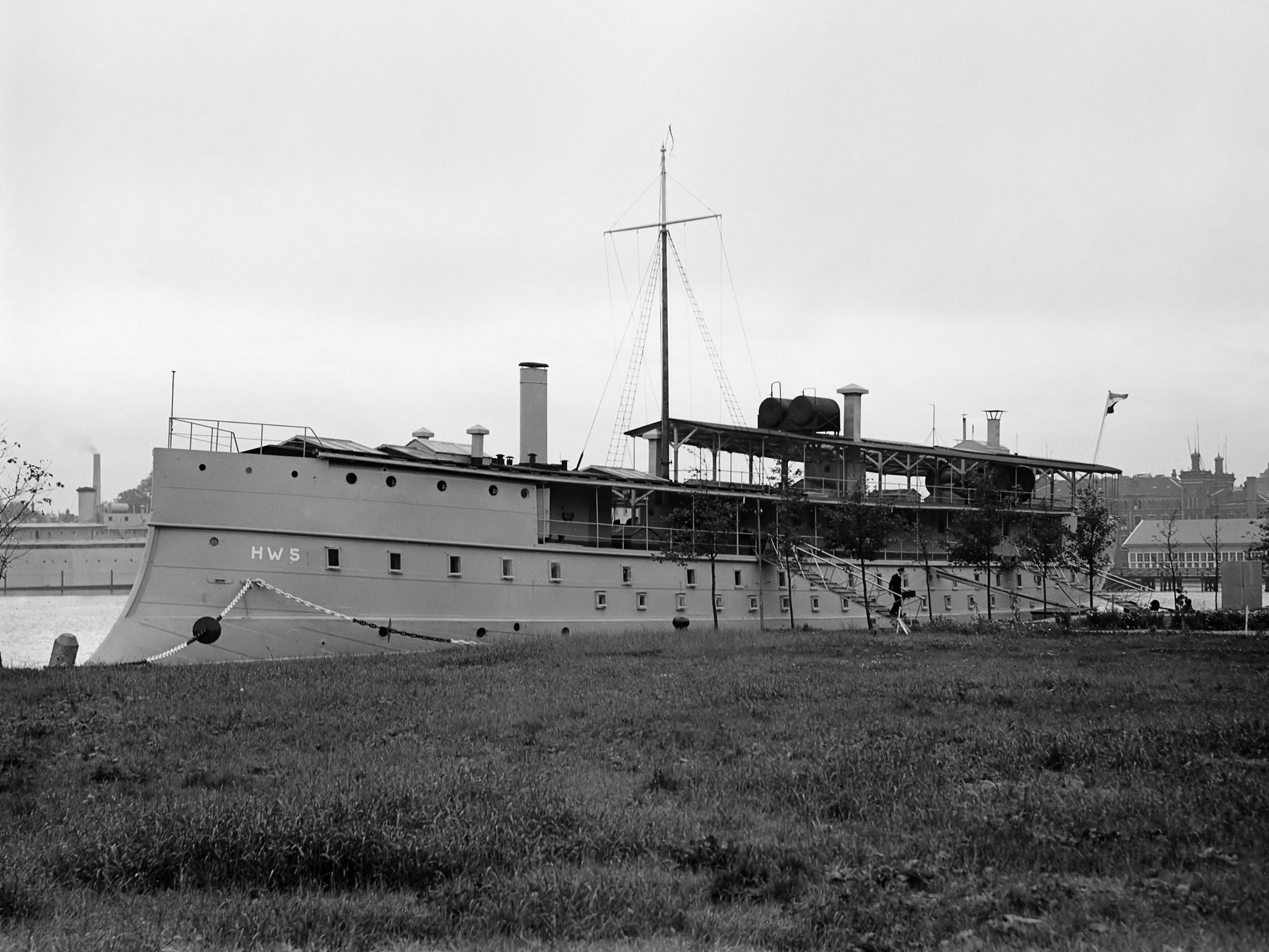
Schorpioen as a barracks ship, 1948

As with Buffel, her record is not very impressive. In 1886 Schorpioen was hit in the stern quarter by a paddle steam tugboat in the harbor of Den Helder and sank in two hours. It was possible to raise and repair her. In 1906 she completed her role as an operational warship and was transformed into an accommodation ship.

At the beginning of World War II, she fell into German hands, was towed to Germany, and served there as a lodging - and storage ship. After the war, in 1947 she was found in Hamburg, Germany and towed back to Den Helder; again to become a lodging ship, first in Amsterdam and later in Den Helder where she became the barracks for the Dutch WRNS. In 1982, after decommissioning, she was bought by a private foundation that was established to transform her into a floating museum in Middelburg, in the southern part of the country. Seven years later, after a complete renovation, she opened her doors to visitors, as a museum ship.

In 1995, the Royal Netherlands Navy re-acquired the ship and put her under the supervision of the Dutch Navy Museum in Den Helder where she is now the third, and largest, vessel on display. In May 2000, after a renovation period of eighteen months to restore her to her former glory, the ship was opened to visitors.

== See also ==
- List of museum ships
