= HNLMS Buffel =

Ironclad warship of the Royal Netherlands Navy

Coordinates: 51.829014°N 4.128711°E

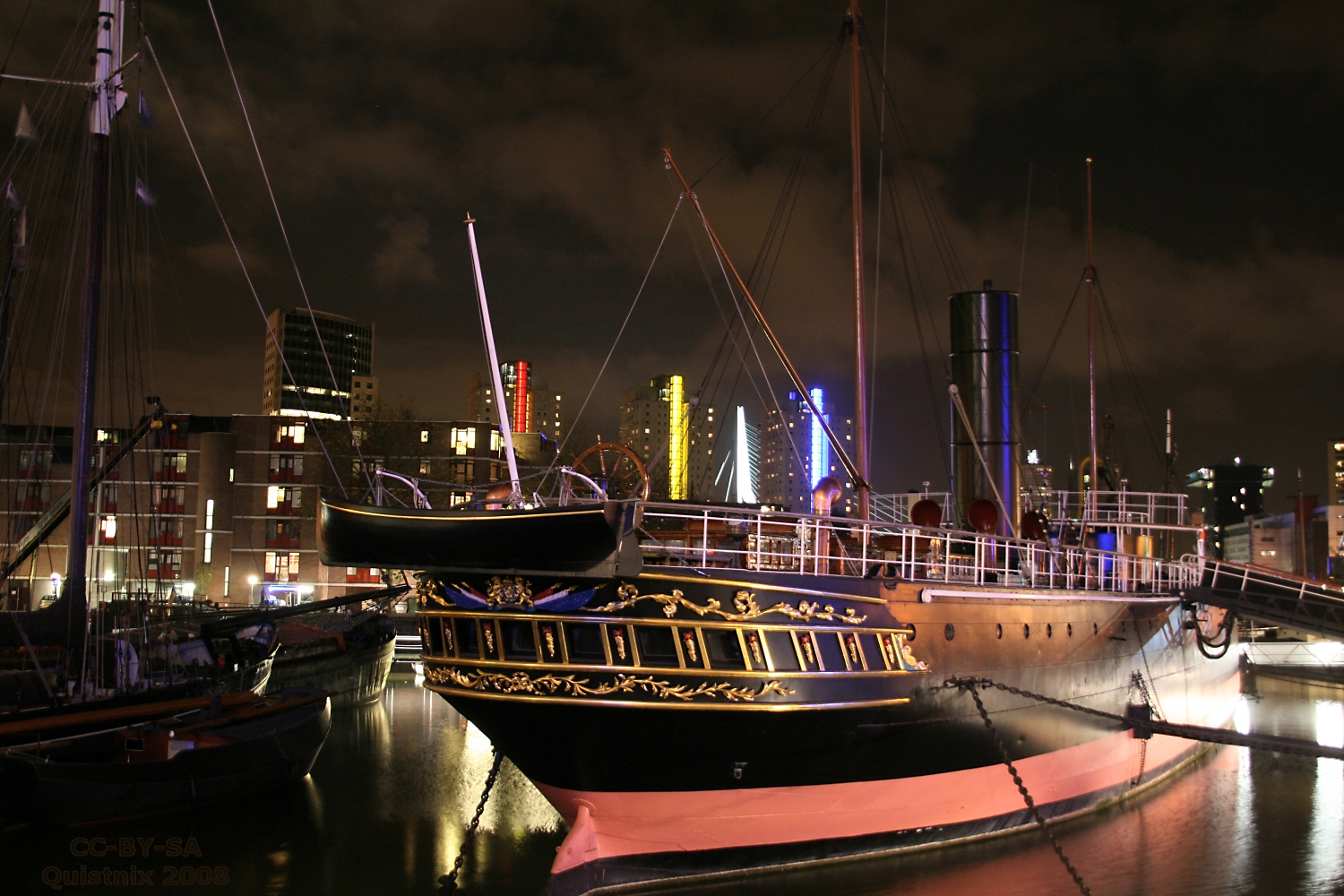
- HNLMS Buffel in 2008

History

Netherlands
- Name: Buffel
- Namesake: Water buffalo
- Builder: Robert Napier and Sons, Glasgow, Scotland
- Laid down: 10 June 1867
- Launched: 10 March 1868
- Completed: 22 July 1868
- Reclassified: As an accommodation ship, 11 June 1896
- Stricken: 1896
- Captured: May 1940

Nazi Germany
- Acquired: May 1940
- Captured: 8 May 1945

Netherlands
- Name: Buffel
- Acquired: 8 May 1945
- Decommissioned: 1973
- Stricken: 1974
- Home port: Den Helder
- Identification: HW-12, 1946; A-884, 1954
- Status: Museum ship, 1974

General characteristics (as completed)
- Class & type: Buffel-class monitor
- Displacement: 2,402 long tons (2,441 t)
- Length: 195 ft 10 in (59.7 m) (p/p)
- Beam: 40 ft (12.2 m)
- Draught: 16 ft 9 in (5.1 m)
- Installed power: 2,000 ihp (1,500 kW); 4 boilers
- Propulsion: 2 shafts, 2 steam engines
- Speed: 11 knots (20 km/h; 13 mph)
- Complement: 159
- Armament: 1 × twin Armstrong 9-inch (229 mm) muzzle-loading rifles; 4 × single 30-pdr Smoothbore guns
- Armour: Belt: 3–6 in (76–152 mm); Gun turrets: 8–11 in (203–279 mm); Deck: .75–1 in (19–25 mm)

HNLMS Buffel is a 19th-century ironclad ram ship. She was one of the main attractions of the Maritime Museum Rotterdam, also known as the Prince Hendrik Museum, named after its founder, Prince Henry (Hendrik) "The Navigator", who had a naval career and established the basis of the museum back in 1874. In October 2013 the ship moved to Hellevoetsluis and is again open for public.

== Construction and design ==
Built in 1868 by Robert Napier and Sons in Glasgow, Scotland, HNLMS Buffel was the first ship of the Royal Netherlands Navy without sails but with a steam engine and two propellers, that gave her a maximum speed of almost 13 knots (24 km/h). Her radius of action at 6 knots (11 km/h) was about 2,150 nautical miles (3,980 km). Her main task as an armor-clad ram ship was to play a role in the Dutch coastal defense together with two sister ships and two monitors.

Her armament was first of all the ram on her bow, mainly against wooden ships, and originally two 300-pound (140 kg), 23 cm (9 in) Armstrong guns, with a total weight of 25 metric tons, in one turret. These were later replaced by a single 28 cm (11 in) gun, and the armament was enhanced by a couple of smaller guns; two 7.5 cm (3 in), four 3.7 cm (1.5 in), and two Hotchkiss revolving cannons.

The crew consisted of 150 officers, petty officers, and sailors.

== Service record ==
The ship's only ocean voyage took place on her maiden trip in 1868 from Glasgow to Den Helder. During the voyage, the vessel rolled very much and took on a lot of water. From that day on Buffel remained in the North Sea (in accordance with her role) and her only foreign port of call was Antwerp, Belgium in 1871.

Buffel participated in many national exercises with the Royal Netherlands Army until 1894 when she was retired from active duty. This was followed by a short, two-year period as a training ship for and from 1896 she acted as a lodging or accommodation ship. She was berthed in several naval establishments in the Netherlands, the last 25 years mainly in Amsterdam. She had the (NATO) pennant number A 884 on her bow, A for Auxiliary and 8 as the first cipher for all Royal Netherlands naval ships.

In 1973 Buffel was decommissioned. In 1974, the vessel was sold to the city of Rotterdam to be modified into a museum ship. From 1979 she was opened for visitors. The ship was moved to Hellevoetsluis in 2013 in order to cut costs. Buffel arrived there on 5 October and was moored temporarily in the brick-built Jan Blanken dry dock. This was all done on a three-year lease. On 7 February 2015 she arrived at her final berthing place at the Koningskade 2, in Het Groote Dock in Hellevoetsluis, where a historic naval quarter has been developed. Positioned here are: Buffel, Bernisse, an old minesweeper, and Noord Hinder a former lightship on the North Sea. The ship is now operated by volunteers from Stichting Museumschip de Buffel.

In October 2016 Stichting Museumschip de Buffel decided not to renew the three-year lease. The group of volunteers then took up the idea to try to save the historical value of the ship for the future. In co-operation with the municipal councils of Rotterdam and Hellevoetsluis, this will be tried out in the coming year 2017.

== See also ==
- HNLMS Schorpioen
- List of museum ships

== Bibliography ==
- Campbell, N. J. M. (1979). "The Netherlands". In Gardiner, Robert (ed.). Conway's All the World's Fighting Ships 1860–1905. Greenwich: Conway Maritime Press. pp. 371–377. ISBN 978-0-8317-0302-8.
- "Dutch Ironclad Rams". Warship International. IX (3): 302–304. 1972.
- Silverstone, Paul H. (1984). Directory of the World's Capital Ships. New York: Hippocrene Books. ISBN 0-88254-979-0.
