= HSwMS John Ericsson =

Swedish lead ship of John Ericsson-class

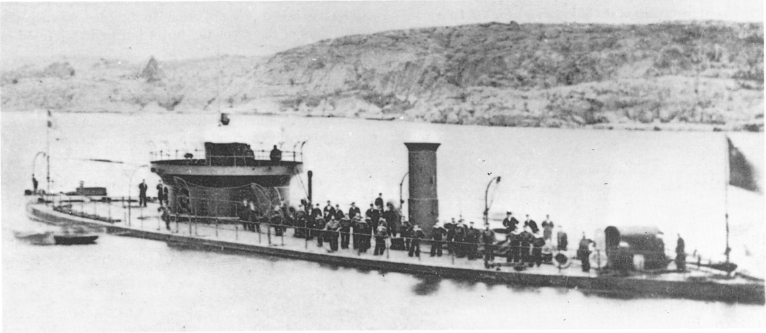
- John Ericsson in 1867, as originally built

History

Sweden
- Name: HSwMS John Ericsson
- Namesake: John Ericsson
- Operator: Swedish Navy
- Awarded: 2 February 1864
- Builder: Motala Verkstad, Norrköping
- Cost: 841,507 Swedish krona
- Laid down: June 1864
- Launched: 17 March 1865
- Commissioned: 13 November 1865
- Fate: sold November 1919

General characteristics
- Class & type: John Ericsson-class monitor
- Displacement: 1,522 metric tons (1,498 long tons)
- Length: 60.88 m (199 ft 9 in)
- Beam: 13.54 m (44 ft 5 in)
- Draft: 3.4 m (11 ft 2 in)
- Installed power: 380 ihp (280 kW)
- Propulsion: 1 shaft, 1 Vibrating lever steam engine, 4 cylindrical boilers
- Speed: 6.5 knots (12.0 km/h; 7.5 mph)
- Range: 950 nautical miles (1,760 km; 1,090 mi)
- Complement: 80–104
- Armament: 2 × 15 in (380 mm) M/65 Dahlgren guns
- Armor: Belt: 124 mm (4.9 in); Gun turret: 270 mm (10.6 in); Deck: 24.6 mm (1.0 in); Conning tower: 225 mm (8.9 in)

HSwMS John Ericsson was the lead ship of the John Ericsson-class monitors built for the Royal Swedish Navy in the mid-1860s. She was designed under the supervision of the Swedish-born inventor, John Ericsson, and built in Sweden. John Ericsson made one foreign visit to Russia in 1867, but remained in Swedish or Norwegian waters (at the time, Sweden and Norway were united in personal union) for the rest of her career. The ship was reconstructed between 1892 and 1895, but generally remained in reserve. She was mobilized during World War I and sold in 1919 for conversion to a barge.

== Design and description ==
The John Ericsson-class ironclads were designed to meet the need of the Swedish and Norwegian navies for small, shallow-draft armored ships capable of defending their coastal waters. The standoff between USS Monitor and the much larger CSS Virginia during the Battle of Hampton Roads in early 1862 roused much interest in Sweden in this new type of warship as it seemed ideal for coastal defense duties. John Ericsson, designer and builder of the Monitor, had been born in Sweden, although he had become an American citizen in 1848, and offered to share his design with the Swedes. In response they sent Lieutenant John Christian d'Ailly to the United States to study monitor design and construction under Ericsson. D'Ailly arrived in July 1862 and toured rolling mills, gun foundries, and visited several different ironclads under construction. He returned to Sweden in 1863 having completed the drawings of a Monitor-type ship under Ericsson's supervision.

The ship measured 60.88 meters (199 ft 9 in) long overall, with a beam of 13.54 meters (44 ft 5 in). She had a draft of 3.4 meters (11 ft 2 in) and displaced 1,522 metric tons (1,498 long tons). John Ericsson was divided into nine main compartments by eight watertight bulkheads. Over time a flying bridge and, later, a full superstructure, was added to each ship between the gun turret and the funnel. Initially her crew numbered 80 officers and men, but this increased to 104 as she was modified with additional weapons.

=== Propulsion ===
The John Ericsson-class ships had one twin-cylinder vibrating lever steam engines, designed by Ericsson himself, driving a single four-bladed, 3.74-meter (12 ft 3 in) propeller. Their engines were powered by four fire-tube boilers at a working pressure of 40 psi (276 kPa; 3 kgf/cm^{2}). The engines produced a total of 380 indicated horsepower (280 kW) which gave the monitors a maximum speed of 6.5 knots (12.0 km/h; 7.5 mph) in calm waters. The ships carried 110 tonnes (110 long tons) of coal, enough for six day's steaming.

=== Armament ===
The lead ship, John Ericsson, carried a pair of smoothbore 15-inch (380 mm) Dahlgren muzzleloaders, donated by John Ericsson, in her turret. Each gun weighed approximately 42,000 pounds (19,000 kg) and fired 440-pound (200 kg) solid shot and a 330-pound (150 kg) explosive shell. The massive shells took 5–6 minutes to reload. They had a maximum muzzle velocity of 375 m/s (1,230 ft/s). These guns were designated as the M/65 by the Swedes.

In 1877 John Ericsson received a pair of 10-barreled 12.17-millimeter (0.479 in) M/75 machine guns designed by Helge Palmcrantz. Each machine gun weighed 115 kilograms (254 lb) and had a rate of fire of 500 rounds per minute. Its projectiles had a muzzle velocity of 386 m/s (1,270 ft/s) and a maximum range of 900 meters (980 yd). These guns were replaced during the 1880s by the 4-barreled 25.4-millimeter (1.00 in) M/77 Nordenfeldt gun, which was an enlarged version of Palmcrantz's original design. The 203-kilogram (448 lb) gun had a rate of fire of 120 rounds per minute and each round had a muzzle velocity of 490 m/s (1,600 ft/s). Its maximum range was 1,600 meters (1,700 yd).

John Ericsson was rearmed in 1881 with two 240-millimeter (9.4 in) M/76 rifled breech loaders, derived from a French design. They weighed 16,688 kilograms (36,791 lb) and had a muzzle velocity of 413 m/s (1,350 ft/s). Coupled with the increased elevation of 11.29°, this gave them a range of 5,000 meters (5,500 yd).

=== Armor ===
The John Ericsson-class ships had a complete waterline armor belt of wrought iron that was 1.8 meters (5 ft 11 in) high and 124 millimeters (4.9 in) thick. The armor consisted of five plates backed by 91 millimeters (3.6 in) of wood. The lower edge of this belt was 74.2 millimeters (2.9 in) thick as it was only three plates thick. The maximum thickness of the armored deck was 24.7 millimeters (1.0 in) in two layers. The gun turret's armor consisted of twelve layers of iron, totalling 270 millimeters (10.6 in) in thickness on the first four monitors. The inside of the turret was lined with mattresses to catch splinters. The base of the turret was protected with a 127-millimeter (5.0 in) glacis, 520 millimeters (20.5 in) high, and the turret's roof was 127 millimeters thick. The conning tower was positioned on top of the turret and its sides were ten layers (250 millimeters (9.8 in)) thick. The funnel was protected by six layers of armor with a total thickness of 120 millimeters (4.7 in) up to half its height.

== Service ==
John Ericsson had her keel laid down in June 1864 and was launched 17 March 1865. She was commissioned on 13 November 1865. In July 1867 Crown Prince Oscar, later King Oscar II, inspected John Ericsson, Tirfing, Thordön, the steam frigates Thor and Vanadis, and the Norwegian monitor Skorpionen in the Stockholm archipelago before they departed for port visits in Helsingfors, later known as Helsinki, and Kronstadt in August, where they were visited by Grand Duke Konstantin Nikolayevich of Russia, head of the Imperial Russian Navy. This was the only foreign visit ever made by the ship.

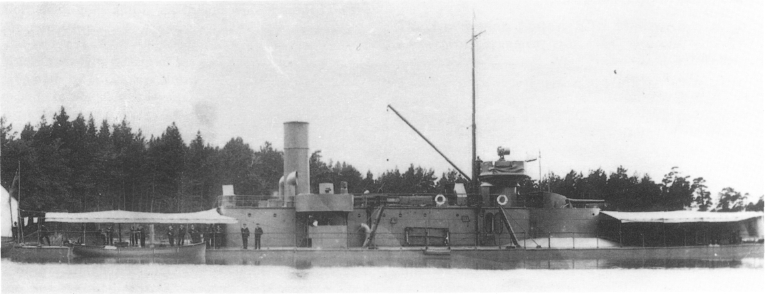
John Ericsson after her reconstruction

Generally the monitors were kept in reserve for most of the year; only being commissioned for two to four months during the summer and fall. John Ericsson kept up the pattern between 1865 and 1873, but remained in reserve afterward until 1882. She was rearmed with two 240-millimeter (9.4 in) M/76 guns in 1881 while her original Dahlgren guns became part of the Ericsson monument at Filipstad. She was reactivated in 1882 and 1883, but only sporadically thereafter. The ship was reconstructed between 1892 and 1895; her gun turret was fixed in place and modified to serve as a barbette for her two new 152-millimeter (6 in) Bofors M/89 guns. The guns could depress to −5° and elevate to +13°, and they had a firing arc of 290°. Two 57-millimeter (2.2 in) Nordenfeldt M/92 quick-firing guns were also added on the superstructure. The ship's boilers were replaced by new cylindrical ones that had a working pressure of 5.5 kg/cm^{2} (539 kPa; 78 psi) and John Ericsson reached 8.17 knots (15.13 km/h; 9.40 mph) on sea trials on 14 May 1901. During the early 1900s the two 25-millimeter machine guns were removed and four, later six, more 57-millimeter guns added to the superstructure. The ship was assigned to the Karlskrona local defense force during 1913–18, and she was sold to the Gotland Cement Company (Swedish: Gotländska Kalkstenskompaniet) in November 1919. The company converted her to a barge and used her for the next forty years; her final fate is unknown.
