= HSwMS Thordön (1865) =

Swedish John Ericsson-class monitor

History

Sweden
- Name: Thordön
- Namesake: Thunder
- Operator: Swedish Navy
- Awarded: 2 February 1864
- Builder: Motala Verkstad, Norrköping
- Cost: 864,285 Swedish krona
- Laid down: November 1864
- Launched: 1 December 1865
- Commissioned: 14 August 1866
- Fate: Sold for scrap, 1922

General characteristics
- Class & type: John Ericsson-class monitor
- Displacement: 1,501 t (1,477 long tons)
- Length: 60.88 m (199 ft 9 in)
- Beam: 13.54 m (44 ft 5 in)
- Draft: 3.4 m (11 ft 2 in)
- Installed power: 4 cylindrical boilers; 380 ihp (280 kW)
- Propulsion: 1 shaft; 1 vibrating-lever steam engine
- Speed: 6.5 knots (12.0 km/h; 7.5 mph)
- Range: 950 nmi (1,760 km; 1,090 mi)
- Complement: 80–104
- Armament: 2 × 267 mm (10.5 in) smoothbore guns
- Armor: Belt: 124 mm (4.9 in); Gun turret: 270 mm (11 in); Deck: 24.6 mm (1 in); Conning tower: 225 mm (8.9 in)

HSwMS Thordön was the second ship of the John Ericsson-class monitors built for the Royal Swedish Navy in the mid-1860s. She was designed under the supervision of the Swedish-born inventor, John Ericsson, and built in Sweden. Thordön made one foreign visit to Russia in 1867, but remained in Swedish or Norwegian waters (at the time, Sweden and Norway were united in personal union) for the rest of her career. The ship was reconstructed between 1903 and 1905, but generally remained in reserve. She was mobilized during World War I, and sold in 1922 for conversion to a barge.

== Design and description ==
The John Ericsson-class ironclads were designed to meet the need of the Swedish and Norwegian navies for small, shallow-draft armored ships capable of defending their coastal waters. The standoff between USS Monitor and the much larger CSS Virginia during the Battle of Hampton Roads in early 1862 roused much interest in Sweden in this new type of warship, as it seemed ideal for coastal defense duties. John Ericsson, designer and builder of the Monitor, had been born in Sweden, although he had become an American citizen in 1848, and offered to share his design with the Swedes. In response they sent Lieutenant John Christian d'Ailly to the United States to study monitor design and construction under Ericsson. D'Ailly arrived in July 1862 and toured rolling mills, gun foundries, and visited several different ironclads under construction. He returned to Sweden in 1863 having completed the drawings of a Monitor-type ship under Ericsson's supervision.

The ship measured 60.88 meters (199 ft 9 in) long overall, with a beam of 13.54 meters (44 ft 5 in). She had a draft of 3.4 meters (11 ft 2 in) and displaced 1,522 metric tons (1,498 long tons). John Ericsson was divided into nine main compartments by eight watertight bulkheads. Over time a flying bridge and, later, a full superstructure, was added to each ship between the gun turret and the funnel. Initially her crew numbered 80 officers and men, but this increased to 104 as she was modified with additional weapons.

=== Propulsion ===
The John Ericsson-class ships had one twin-cylinder vibrating lever steam engines, designed by Ericsson himself, driving a single four-bladed, 3.74-meter (12 ft 3 in) propeller. Their engines were powered by four fire-tube boilers at a working pressure of 40 psi (276 kPa; 3 kgf/cm^{2}). The engines produced a total of 380 indicated horsepower (280 kW) which gave the monitors a maximum speed of 6.5 knots (12.0 km/h; 7.5 mph) in calm waters. The ships carried 110 tonnes (110 long tons) of coal, enough for six day's steaming.

=== Armament ===
Thordön, and her sister ship Tirfing, were briefly armed with a pair of 267-millimeter (10.5 in) M/66 smoothbore guns before being rearmed in 1873 with two 240-millimeter (9.4 in) M/69 rifled breech loaders, derived from a French design. They weighed 14,670 kilograms (32,340 lb) and fired projectiles at a muzzle velocity of 397 m/s (1,300 ft/s). At their maximum elevation of 7.5° they had a range of 3,500 meters (3,800 yd). An improved version was developed in the 1870s; the guns were heavier, 16,688 kilograms (36,791 lb), but had a higher muzzle velocity of 413 m/s (1,350 ft/s). Coupled with the increased elevation of 11.29°, this gave them a range of 5,000 meters (5,500 yd). Thordön received her guns in 1882.

In 1877 each monitor received a pair of 10-barreled 12.17-millimeter (0.479 in) M/75 machine guns designed by Helge Palmcrantz. Each machine gun weighed 115 kilograms (254 lb) and had a rate of fire of 500 rounds per minute. Its projectiles had a muzzle velocity of 386 m/s (1,270 ft/s) and a maximum range of 900 meters (980 yd). These guns were replaced during the 1880s by the 4-barreled 25.4-millimeter (1.00 in) M/77 Nordenfeldt gun, which was an enlarged version of Palmcrantz's original design. The 203-kilogram (448 lb) gun had a rate of fire of 120 rounds per minute and each round had a muzzle velocity of 490 m/s (1,600 ft/s). Its maximum range was 1,600 meters (1,700 yd).

=== Armor ===
The John Ericsson-class ships had a complete waterline armor belt of wrought iron that was 1.8 meters (5 ft 11 in) high and 124 millimeters (4.9 in) thick. The armor consisted of five plates backed by 91 millimeters (3.6 in) of wood. The lower edge of this belt was 74.2 millimeters (2.9 in) thick as it was only three plates thick. The maximum thickness of the armored deck was 24.7 millimeters (1.0 in) in two layers. The gun turret's armor consisted of twelve layers of iron, totalling 270 millimeters (10.6 in) in thickness on the first four monitors. The inside of the turret was lined with mattresses to catch splinters. The base of the turret was protected with a 127-millimeter (5.0 in) glacis, 520 millimeters (20.5 in) high, and the turret's roof was 127 millimeters thick. The conning tower was positioned on top of the turret and its sides were ten layers (250 millimeters (9.8 in)) thick. The funnel was protected by six layers of armor with a total thickness of 120 millimeters (4.7 in) up to half its height.

== Service ==
Thordön had her keel laid down in November 1864 and was launched on 1 December 1865. She was commissioned on 14 August 1866. In July 1867 Crown Prince Oscar, later King Oscar II, inspected Thordön, John Ericsson, Tirfing, the steam frigates Thor and Vanadis, and the Norwegian monitor Skorpionen in the Stockholm archipelago before they departed for port visits in Helsingfors, later known as Helsinki, and Kronstadt in August, where they were visited by Grand Duke Konstantin Nikolayevich of Russia, head of the Imperial Russian Navy. This was the only foreign visit ever made by the ship.

Thordön (later spelled Tordön) was laid up in reserve in 1868 and 1869. She was rearmed with 240-millimeter M/69 guns (serial numbers 5 and 6) in 1872, but was laid up again from 1874 to 1882. The ship ran aground and sank on Lilla Rimö Island, off Norrköping, on 23 July 1883. She was salvaged on 4 August and managed to proceed under her own power to Karlskrona Naval Dockyard for repairs. The subsequent court-martial ordered the ship's captain to pay for the costs of the salvage and repairs, despite a misplaced buoy that caused the ship to ground. She was recommissioned in 1885 and 1888–89 before being placed back in reserve. Tordön was reconstructed in 1903–05; she received a pair of new 120-millimeter (4.7 in) Bofors M/94 guns that were given elevation limits of −7° and +15°. The ship also received eight 57-millimeter guns and new boilers. She was reactivated during World War I and assigned to the Gothenburg local defense flotilla in company with her sister Tirfing. Both ships were decommissioned in 1922 and sold the following year. Their new owner converted them into barges and used them in Stockholm harbor.
