= John Ericsson-class monitor =

Royal Swedish Navy's and Royal Norwegian Navy's John Ericsson-class monitors

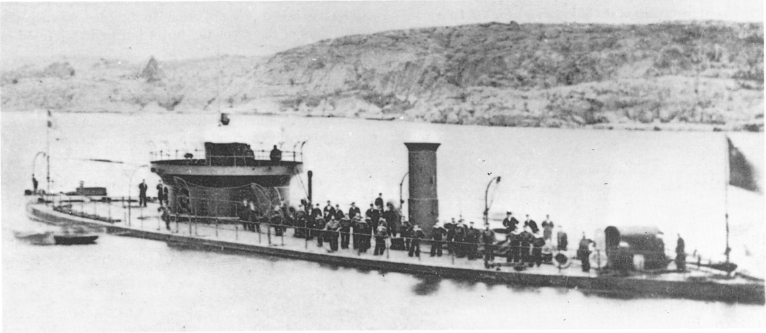
- John Ericsson in 1867, as originally built

Class overview
- Name: John Ericsson class
- Builders: Motala Verkstad, Norrköping
- Operators: Swedish Navy; Royal Norwegian Navy
- Preceded by: None
- Succeeded by: HMS Garmer
- Built: 1864–1871
- In service: 1865–1922
- Completed: 5
- Scrapped: 5

General characteristics
- Type: Monitor
- Displacement: 1,522 metric tons (1,498 long tons)
- Length: 60.88 m (199 ft 9 in)
- Beam: 13.54 m (44 ft 5 in)
- Draft: 3.4 m (11 ft 2 in)
- Installed power: 380 ihp (280 kW)
- Propulsion: 1 shaft, 1 Vibrating lever steam engine, 4 cylindrical boilers
- Speed: 6.5 knots (12.0 km/h; 7.5 mph)
- Range: 950 nautical miles (1,760 km; 1,090 mi)
- Complement: 80–104
- Armament: 2 × 15 in (380 mm) M/65 Dahlgren guns (John Ericsson); 2 × 267 mm (10.5 in) M/66 smoothbore guns (Thordön and Tirfing); 2 × 270 mm (10.6 in) Armstrong guns; 1 × 80 mm (3.1 in) gun (Mjølner); 2 × 240 mm (9.4 in) M/69 guns (Loke)
- Armor: Belt: 124 mm (4.9 in); Gun turret: 270 mm (11 in); Deck: 24.6 mm (1.0 in); Conning tower: 225 mm (8.9 in)

The John Ericsson-class monitors were a group of five iron-hulled monitors; four were built for the Royal Swedish Navy and one for the Royal Norwegian Navy in the mid to late 1860s. They were designed under the supervision of the Swedish-born inventor, John Ericsson, and built in Sweden. Generally, the monitors were kept in reserve for the majority of the year and were only commissioned for several during the year. The ships made one foreign visit to Russia (visits to Norway did not count as foreign as that country was in a personal union with Sweden) in 1867 but remained in Swedish or Norwegian waters for the rest of their careers. Two of the monitors, Thordon and Mjølner, ran aground, but were salvaged and repaired. Most of the monitors were reconstructed between 1892 and 1905 with more modern guns, but one was scrapped instead as it was not thought cost-effective to rebuild such an old ship. The surviving ships were mobilized during World War I and sold for scrap afterwards.

== Design and description ==
The John Ericsson-class ironclads were designed to meet the need of the Swedish and Norwegian Navies for small, shallow-draft armored ships capable of defending their coastal waters. The standoff between USS Monitor and the much larger CSS Virginia during the Battle of Hampton Roads in early 1862 roused much interest in Sweden in this new type of warship as it seemed ideal for coastal defense duties. A parliamentary committee set up earlier to investigate the state of the Swedish navy had already concluded that the existing fleet was obsolete and new construction would have to be steam-powered and built of iron. John Ericsson, designer and builder of the Monitor, had been born in Sweden, although he had become an American citizen in 1848, and offered to share his design with the Swedes. In response they sent Lieutenant John Christian d'Ailly to the United States to study monitor design and construction under Ericsson. D'Ailly arrived in July 1862 and toured rolling mills, gun foundries, and visited several different ironclads under construction. He returned to Sweden in 1863 having completed the drawings of a Monitor-type ship under Ericsson's supervision.

The ships measured 60.88 meters (199 ft 9 in) long overall, with a beam of 13.54 meters (44 ft 5 in). They had a draft of 3.4 meters (11 ft 2 in) and displaced 1,522 metric tons (1,498 long tons). The ships were divided into nine main compartments by eight watertight bulkheads. Over time a flying bridge and, later, a full superstructure, was added to each ship between the gun turret and the funnel. Initially their crew numbered 80 officers and men, but this increased to 104 as the ships were modified with additional weapons.

Loke, the last-built ship in the class, was somewhat larger than her half-sisters. She was 64.4 meters (211 ft 3 in) long overall, with a maximum beam of 14.03 meters (46 ft 0 in). The ship drew 3.7 meters (12 ft 2 in) and displaced 1,620 metric tons (1,590 long tons) fully loaded.

=== Propulsion ===
The John Ericsson-class ships had one twin-cylinder vibrating lever steam engines, designed by Ericsson himself, driving a single four-bladed, 3.74-meter (12 ft 3 in) propeller. Their engines were powered by four fire-tube boilers at a working pressure of 40 psi (276 kPa; 3 kgf/cm^{2}). The engines produced a total of 380 indicated horsepower (280 kW) which gave the monitors a maximum speed of 6.5 knots (12.0 km/h; 7.5 mph) in calm waters. The ships carried 110 tonnes (110 long tons) of coal, enough for six day's steaming.

=== Armament ===
The lead ship, John Ericsson, carried a pair of smoothbore 15-inch (380 mm) Dahlgren muzzleloaders, donated by John Ericsson, in her turret. Each gun weighed approximately 42,000 pounds (19,000 kg) and fired 440-pound (200 kg) solid shot and a 330-pound (150 kg) explosive shell. The massive shells took 5–6 minutes to reload. They had a maximum muzzle velocity of 375 m/s (1,230 ft/s). These guns were designated as the M/65 by the Swedes, but they were not satisfied with their performance and replaced them with other guns in the later ships.

Thordön and Tirfing were briefly armed with a pair of 267-millimeter (10.5 in) M/66 smoothbore guns before being rearmed in 1872–73 with two 240-millimeter (9.4 in) M/69 rifled breech loaders, derived from a French design. Loke, being the last ship delivered, was equipped with these guns while building. They weighed 14,670 kilograms (32,340 lb) and fired projectiles at a muzzle velocity of 397 m/s (1,300 ft/s). At their maximum elevation of 7.5° they had a range of 3,500 meters (3,800 yd). An improved version was developed in the 1870s and John Ericsson was fitted with them when she was overhauled in 1881. The guns were heavier, 16,688 kilograms (36,791 lb), but had a higher muzzle velocity of 413 m/s (1,350 ft/s). Coupled with the increased elevation of 11.29°, this gave them a range of 5,000 meters (5,500 yd). The other monitors gradually received their guns: Thordön in 1882, Tirfing in 1885 and Loke in 1890.

In 1877 each monitor received a pair of 10-barreled 12.17-millimeter (0.479 in) M/75 machine guns designed by Helge Palmcrantz. Each machine gun weighed 115 kilograms (254 lb) and had a rate of fire of 500 rounds per minute. Its projectiles had a muzzle velocity of 386 m/s (1,270 ft/s) and a maximum range of 900 meters (980 yd). These guns were replaced during the 1880s by the 4-barreled 25.4-millimeter (1.00 in) M/77 Nordenfeldt gun, which was an enlarged version of Palmcrantz's original design. The 203-kilogram (448 lb) gun had a rate of fire of 120 rounds per minute and each round had a muzzle velocity of 490 m/s (1,600 ft/s). Its maximum range was 1,600 meters (1,700 yd).

=== Armor ===
The John Ericsson-class ships had a complete waterline armor belt of wrought iron that was 1.8 meters (5 ft 11 in) high and 124 millimeters (4.9 in) thick. The armor consisted of five plates backed by 91 millimeters (3.6 in) of wood. The lower edge of this belt was 74.2 millimeters (2.9 in) thick as it was only three plates thick. The maximum thickness of the armored deck was 24.7 millimeters (1.0 in) in two layers. The gun turret's armor consisted of twelve layers of iron, totaling 270 millimeters (10.6 in) in thickness on the first four monitors. The armor on Loke's turret was reinforced to a thickness of 447 millimeters (17.6 in) on its face and 381 millimeters (15.0 in) on its sides. The inside of the turret was lined with mattresses to catch splinters. The base of the turret was protected with a 127-millimeter (5.0 in) glacis, 520 millimeters (20.5 in) high, and the turret's roof was 127 millimeters thick. The conning tower was positioned on top of the turret and its sides were ten layers (250 millimeters (9.8 in)) thick. The funnel was protected by six layers of armor with a total thickness of 120 millimeters (4.7 in) up to half its height.

== Construction ==
Construction data
Ship	Builder	Laid down	Launched	Completed	Fate
John Ericsson	Motala Verkstad, Norrköping	June 1864	17 March 1865	13 November 1865	Sold, November 1919
Thordön	Motala Verkstad, Norrköping	November 1864	1 December 1865	14 August 1866	Sold, 1922
Tirfing	Motala Verkstad, Norrköping	28 January 1865	1 June 1866	2 July 1867	Sold for scrap, 1922
Loke	Motala Verkstad, Norrköping	March 1867	4 September 1869	22 October 1871	Scrapped, 1908
Mjølner	Motala Verkstad, Norrköping	1867	1868	7 September 1868	Scrapped, 1909

== Service ==
In July 1867 Crown Prince Oscar, later King Oscar II, inspected John Ericsson, Thordön, Tirfing, the steam frigates Thor and Vanadis, and the Norwegian monitor Skorpionen in the Stockholm archipelago before they departed for port visits in Helsingfors, later known as Helsinki, and Kronstadt in August, where they were visited by Grand Duke Konstantin Nikolayevich of Russia, head of the Imperial Russian Navy. These were the only foreign visits ever made by the three Swedish monitors.

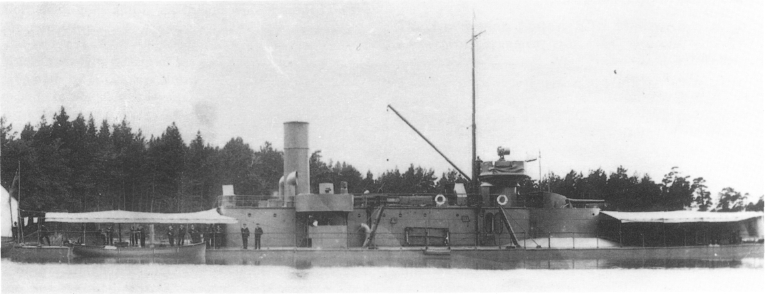
John Ericsson after her reconstruction

Generally the monitors were kept in reserve for the majority of the year; only being commissioned for two to four months during the summer and fall. John Ericsson, named for the inventor, kept up the pattern between 1865 and 1873, but remained in reserve afterward until 1882. She was rearmed with the 240-millimeter M/76 guns in 1881 and her original Dahlgren guns became part of the Ericsson monument at Filipstad. The ship was reactivated in 1882 and 1883, but only sporadically thereafter. John Ericsson was reconstructed between 1892 and 1895; her gun turret was fixed in place and modified to serve as a barbette for her two new 152-millimeter (6 in) Bofors M/89 guns. The guns could depress to −5° and elevate to +13°, and they had a firing arc of 290°. Two 57-millimeter (2.2 in) Nordenfeldt M/92 quick-firing guns were also added on the superstructure. The ship's boilers were replaced by new cylindrical ones that had a working pressure of 5.5 kg/cm^{2} (539 kPa; 78 psi) and John Ericsson reached 8.17 knots (15.13 km/h; 9.40 mph) on sea trials on 14 May 1901. During the early 1900s the two 25-millimeter machine guns were removed and four, later six, more 57-millimeter guns added to the superstructure. The ship was assigned to the Karlskrona local defense force during 1913–18, and she was sold to the Gotland Cement Company (Swedish: Gotländska Kalkstenskompaniet) in November 1919. The company converted her to a barge and used her for the next forty years; her final fate is unknown.

Thordön (later spelled Tordön) was laid up in reserve in 1868 and 1869. She was rearmed with 240-millimeter M/69 guns (serial numbers 5 and 6) in 1872, but was laid up again from 1874 to 1882. The ship ran aground and sank on Lilla Rimö Island, off Norrköping, on 23 July 1883. She was salvaged on 4 August and managed to proceed under her own power to Karlskrona Naval Dockyard for repairs. The subsequent court-martial ordered the ship's captain to pay for the costs of the salvage and repairs, despite a misplaced buoy that caused the ship to ground. She was recommissioned in 1885 and 1888–89 before being placed back in reserve. Tordön was reconstructed in 1903–05; she received a pair of new 120-millimeter (4.7 in) Bofors M/94 guns that were given elevation limits of −7° and +15°. The ship also received eight 57-millimeter guns and new boilers. She was reactivated during World War I and assigned to the Gothenburg local defense flotilla. Thordön was decommissioned in 1922 and sold the following year. Her new owner converted her into a barge and used her in Stockholm harbor.

Tirfing was commissioned less often than the first two monitors. She was only active in 1867, 1873, 1880, 1885 and 1888–89 before she was mobilized for World War I. Tirfing received her 240-millimeter M/69 guns in 1873. The ship was reconstructed at the same time and in a similar manner as was Tordön, except that she received eight 47-millimeter (1.9 in) M/95 quick-firing guns taken from the Komet and Stierna-class torpedo boats. Tirfing joined her sister Thordön as part of the Göteborg flotilla during World War I and shared her fate.

Loke made only seven cruises before she was finally placed in reserve in late 1880. Funds were requested to rebuild her in 1903 and 1908, but they were refused. She was decommissioned on 21 August 1908 and advertised for sale. The details of her fate are unknown, but presumably she was sold and scrapped.

The Norwegians had built one monitor-type ship of their own, Skorpionen, in 1865, and laid down several others, but the Norwegian Parliament authorized construction of Mjølner in 1867 in Sweden at the cost of 1,102,000 Norwegian krone. (Note: The exact relationship between the Norwegian Skorpionen-class monitors and the John Ericsson class is unclear. Harris says that the Skorpionen class merely had five, instead of four, boilers and were otherwise identical, see p. 34. But Gardiner cites slightly different dimensions and counts Mjølner as part of the class, see p. 368, as does Silverstone, p. 350) She was armed with a pair of steel 270-millimeter (10.6 in) Armstrong rifled muzzle-loading guns in her turret as well as an 80-millimeter (3.1 in) gun. The ship ran aground in 1869, but was only lightly damaged. She was visited by King Charles XV of Sweden on one occasion when visiting one of Sweden's west-coast ports in the early 1870s. Mjølner was reconstructed in 1897: her turret was converted to a barbette and her main guns were replaced by a pair of Cockerill 120-millimeter quick-firing guns. In addition two 124-millimeter (4.9 in) and two 65-millimeter (2.6 in) Cockerill guns were mounted in her superstructure as well as two 37-millimeter Hotchkiss 5-barrel revolving guns. Mjølner spent most of her career in Oslo Fjord and was scrapped in 1909.

== See also ==
- List of ironclads
