= HSwMS Loke (1869) =

Swedish John Ericsson-class monitor

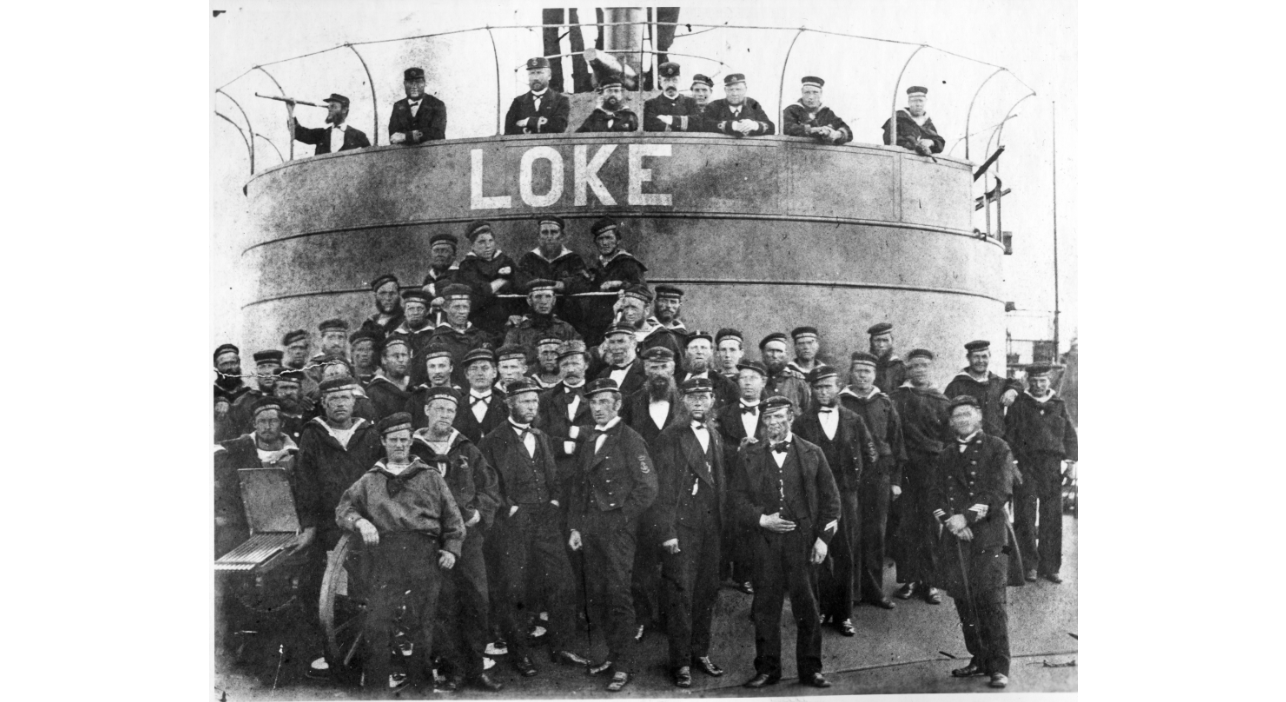

History

Sweden
- Name: HSwMS Loke
- Namesake: Loki
- Operator: Swedish Navy
- Awarded: 8 March 1866
- Builder: Motala Verkstad, Norrköping
- Cost: 1,200,428 Swedish krona
- Laid down: March 1867
- Launched: 4 September 1869
- Commissioned: 22 October 1871
- Decommissioned: 21 August 1908
- Fate: Sold after 21 August 1908

General characteristics
- Class & type: John Ericsson-class monitor
- Displacement: 1,594 metric tons (1,569 long tons)
- Length: 64.4 m (211 ft 3 in)
- Beam: 14.03 m (46 ft 0 in)
- Draft: 3.7 m (12 ft 2 in)
- Installed power: 380 ihp (280 kW)
- Propulsion: 1 shaft, 1 Vibrating lever steam engine, 4 cylindrical boilers
- Speed: 6.5 knots (12.0 km/h; 7.5 mph)
- Range: 950 nautical miles (1,760 km; 1,090 mi)
- Complement: 80–104
- Armament: 2 × 240 mm (9.4 in) M/69 guns
- Armor: Belt: 124 mm (4.9 in); Gun turret: 381–447 mm (15.0–17.6 in); Deck: 24.6 mm (1.0 in); Conning tower: 225 mm (8.9 in)

HSwMS Loke was the fourth, and last, ship of the John Ericsson-class monitors built for the Royal Swedish Navy in the late-1860s. Completed in 1871 she only made seven short cruises before she was permanently placed in reserve in late 1880. Funds were requested to reconstruct her in line with the other monitors, but were denied. She was listed for sale in 1908, but nothing is known of her fate.

== Design and description ==
The John Ericsson-class ironclads were designed to meet the need of the Swedish and Norwegian Navies for small, shallow-draft armored ships capable of defending their coastal waters. The standoff between USS Monitor and the much larger CSS Virginia during the Battle of Hampton Roads in early 1862 roused much interest in Sweden in this new type of warship as it seemed ideal for coastal defense duties. John Ericsson, designer and builder of the Monitor, had been born in Sweden, although he had become an American citizen in 1848, and offered to share his design with the Swedes. In response they sent Lieutenant John Christian d'Ailly to the United States to study monitor design and construction under Ericsson. D'Ailly arrived in July 1862 and toured rolling mills, gun foundries, and visited several different ironclads under construction. He returned to Sweden in 1863 having completed the drawings of a Monitor-type ship under Ericsson's supervision.

Loke, the last-built ship in the class, was somewhat larger than her half-sisters. She was 64.4 meters (211 ft 3 in) long overall, with a maximum beam of 14.03 meters (46 ft 0 in). The ship drew 3.7 meters (12 ft 2 in) and displaced 1,620 metric tons (1,590 long tons) fully loaded. The ship was divided into nine main compartments by eight watertight bulkheads. Over time a flying bridge and, later, a full superstructure, was added to each ship between the gun turret and the funnel. Initially their crew numbered 80 officers and men, but this increased to 104 as the ships were modified with additional weapons.

=== Propulsion ===
The John Ericsson-class ships had one twin-cylinder vibrating lever steam engines, designed by Ericsson himself, driving a single four-bladed, 3.74-meter (12 ft 3 in) propeller. Their engines were powered by four fire-tube boilers at a working pressure of 40 psi (276 kPa; 3 kgf/cm^{2}). The engines produced a total of 380 indicated horsepower (280 kW) which gave the monitors a maximum speed of 6.5 knots (12.0 km/h; 7.5 mph) in calm waters. The ships carried 110 tonnes (110 long tons) of coal, enough for six day's steaming.

=== Armament ===
Loke was equipped with two 240-millimeter (9.4 in) M/69 rifled breech loaders, derived from a French design. They weighed 14,670 kilograms (32,340 lb) and fired projectiles at a muzzle velocity of 397 m/s (1,300 ft/s). At their maximum elevation of 7.5° they had a range of 3,500 meters (3,800 yd). An improved version was developed in the 1870s and Loke was fitted with them in 1890. The guns were heavier, 16,688 kilograms (36,791 lb), but had a higher muzzle velocity of 413 m/s (1,350 ft/s). Coupled with the increased elevation of 11.29°, this gave them a range of 5,000 meters (5,500 yd).

In 1877 the monitor received a pair of 10-barreled 12.17-millimeter (0.479 in) M/75 machine guns designed by Helge Palmcrantz. Each machine gun weighed 115 kilograms (254 lb) and had a rate of fire of 500 rounds per minute. Its projectiles had a muzzle velocity of 386 m/s (1,270 ft/s) and a maximum range of 900 meters (980 yd). These guns were replaced during the 1880s by the 4-barreled 25.4-millimeter (1.00 in) M/77 Nordenfeldt gun, which was an enlarged version of Palmcrantz's original design. The 203-kilogram (448 lb) gun had a rate of fire of 120 rounds per minute and each round had a muzzle velocity of 490 m/s (1,600 ft/s). Its maximum range was 1,600 meters (1,700 yd).

=== Armor ===
The John Ericsson-class ships had a complete waterline armor belt of wrought iron that was 1.8 meters (5 ft 11 in) high and 124 millimeters (4.9 in) thick. The armor consisted of five plates backed by 91 millimeters (3.6 in) of wood. The lower edge of this belt was 74.2 millimeters (2.9 in) thick as it was only three plates thick. The maximum thickness of the armored deck was 24.7 millimeters (1.0 in) in two layers. Loke's gun turret's armor was somewhat heavier than her half-sisters and consisted of 447 millimeters (17.6 in) on its face and 381 millimeters (15.0 in) on its sides. The inside of the turret was lined with mattresses to catch splinters. The base of the turret was protected with a 127-millimeter (5.0 in) glacis, 520 millimeters (20.5 in) high, and the turret's roof was 127 millimeters thick. The conning tower was positioned on top of the turret and its sides were ten layers (250 millimeters (9.8 in)) thick. The funnel was protected by six layers of armor with a total thickness of 120 millimeters (4.7 in) up to half its height.

== Service ==
Loke had her keel laid down in March 1867 and was launched on 4 September 1869. She was commissioned on 22 October 1871 at the cost of 1,200,428 Swedish krona. The delay in construction may have been due to manufacturing difficulties by the British supplier of her armor plate. Generally the monitors were kept in reserve for most of the year; only being commissioned for two to four months during the summer and fall. Loke made only seven cruises, the last in late 1880, and was not commissioned afterwards. Funds were requested to rebuild her in 1903 and 1908, but they were refused. She was decommissioned on 21 August 1908 and advertised for sale. The details of her fate are unknown, but presumably she was sold and scrapped.
