= Mjølner =

Mjølner may refer to:

- Mjölnir or Mjølner, the god Thor's hammer
- FK Mjølner, football club from Narvik
- HNoMS Mjølner (1868), a Norwegian naval vessel
- Inntrøndelagen, a newspaper of Steinkjer known as Mjølner from 1897 to 1900
