= Tyrfing (disambiguation) =

Tyrfing was a magic sword in Norse mythology.

Tyrfing or Tirfing may refer to:

- Thyrfing, a viking metal band from Sweden
- Tirfing, an opera by Swedish composer Wilhelm Stenhammar
- HSwMS Tirfing, several ships of the Swedish Navy
- Super Sonic Strike Missile (3SM) Tyrfing, a missile under development
- SK Tirfing, a sports club in Harnäs, Sweden

== See also ==
- Tyrfing Cycle, a collection of Norse legends
