= HSwMS Tirfing =

Several ships of the Swedish Navy have been named HSwMS Tirfing, named after Tyrfing, a magic sword in Norse mythology:

- HSwMS Tirfing (1866) was a John Ericsson-class monitor launched in 1866 and decommissioned in 1922
- HSwMS Tirfing (P166) was a Hugin-class patrol boat launched in 1981 and sold in 2008
