= HSwMS Tordön =

Several ships of the Swedish Navy have been named HSwMS Tordön or HSwMS Thordön, named after the Old Norse word for thunder:

- Thordön (1761) was a bomb vessel launched in 1741 and decommissioned in 1784
- HSwMS Thordön (1865) was a John Ericsson-class monitor launched in 1865 and decommissioned in 1925
- HSwMS Tordön (P165) was a Hugin-class patrol boat launched in 1981 and sold in 2008

== Citations ==
=== Bibliography ===
- Campbell, N. J. M. (1979). "Sweden". In Gardiner, Robert (ed.). Conway's All the World's Fighting Ships 1860–1905. London: Conway Maritime Press. pp. 360–363. ISBN 978-0-85177-133-5.
- Westerlund, Karl-Eric (1985). "Sweden". In Gray, Randal (ed.). Conway's All the World's Fighting Ships 1906–1921. London: Conway Maritime Press. pp. 355–363. ISBN 978-0-85177-245-5.
- Westerlund, Karl-Eric & Chumbley, Stephen (1995). "Sweden". In Chumbley, Stephen (ed.). Conway's All The World's Fighting Ships 1947–1995. Annapolis, Maryland: Naval Institute Press. pp. 443–453. ISBN 1-55750-132-7.
