= HNoMS Thrudvang =

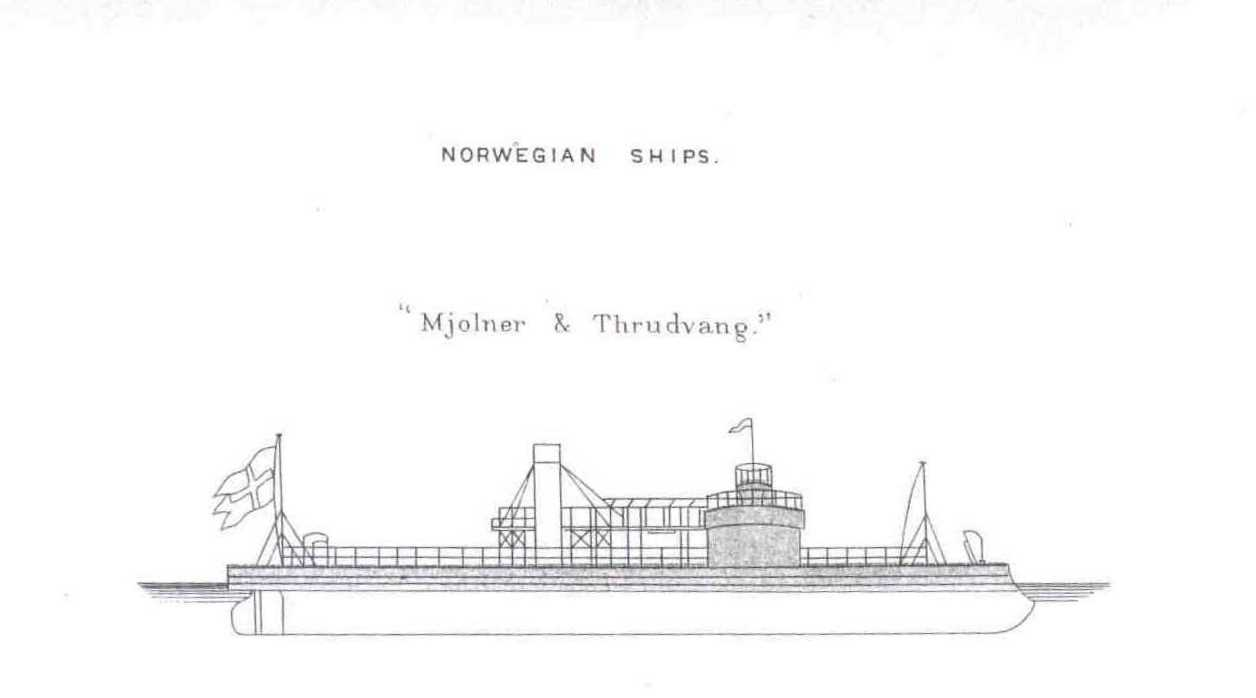

History

Norway
- Name: Thrudvang
- Namesake: Þrúðvangr – the realm of the Norse god Thor
- Launched: May 3, 1869
- Fate: Scrapped 1908

General characteristics
- Class & type: Skorpionen-class monitor
- Displacement: 1,517 t (1,493 long tons)
- Length: 62.39 m (204 ft 8 in)
- Beam: 13.86 m (45 ft 6 in)
- Draft: 3.29 m (10 ft 10 in)
- Installed power: 4 cylindrical boilers; 500 ihp (370 kW)
- Propulsion: 1 shaft, 1 Vibrating lever steam engine
- Speed: 8.5 knots (15.7 km/h; 9.8 mph)
- Range: 950 nautical miles (1,760 km; 1,090 mi)
- Complement: 80
- Armament: 2 × 120 mm (4.7 in) R.F.G guns; 2 × 9 lb (4.1 kg) guns
- Armor: Belt: 124 mm (4.9 in); Gun turret: 305 mm (12.0 in); Deck: 24.6 mm (0.97 in); Conning tower: 225 mm (8.9 in)

HNoMS Thrudvang was a monitor class ship built for the Royal Norwegian Navy. launched May 3, 1869, completed June 13, 1870. She was scrapped in 1908.

== Details ==
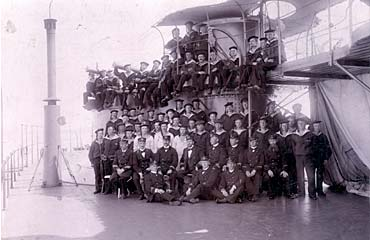
The crew of Thrudvang photographed on 13 June 1870, gathered around the central turret. Note ventilator on left side.

it was one of four monitor class vessels in the Royal Norwegian Navy. when it first launched it was armed with two RML 10-inch 18-ton guns. in 1895-96 it was refitted with two 4.7 inch rapid-firing guns and two 9-pounder rapid-firing guns. it had iron armor, the Belt armor was 5 to 4 inches, the turrets had 12 inches, and the deck had 1 inch of armor.
