= Skorpionen-class monitor =

Royal Norwegian Navy monitor

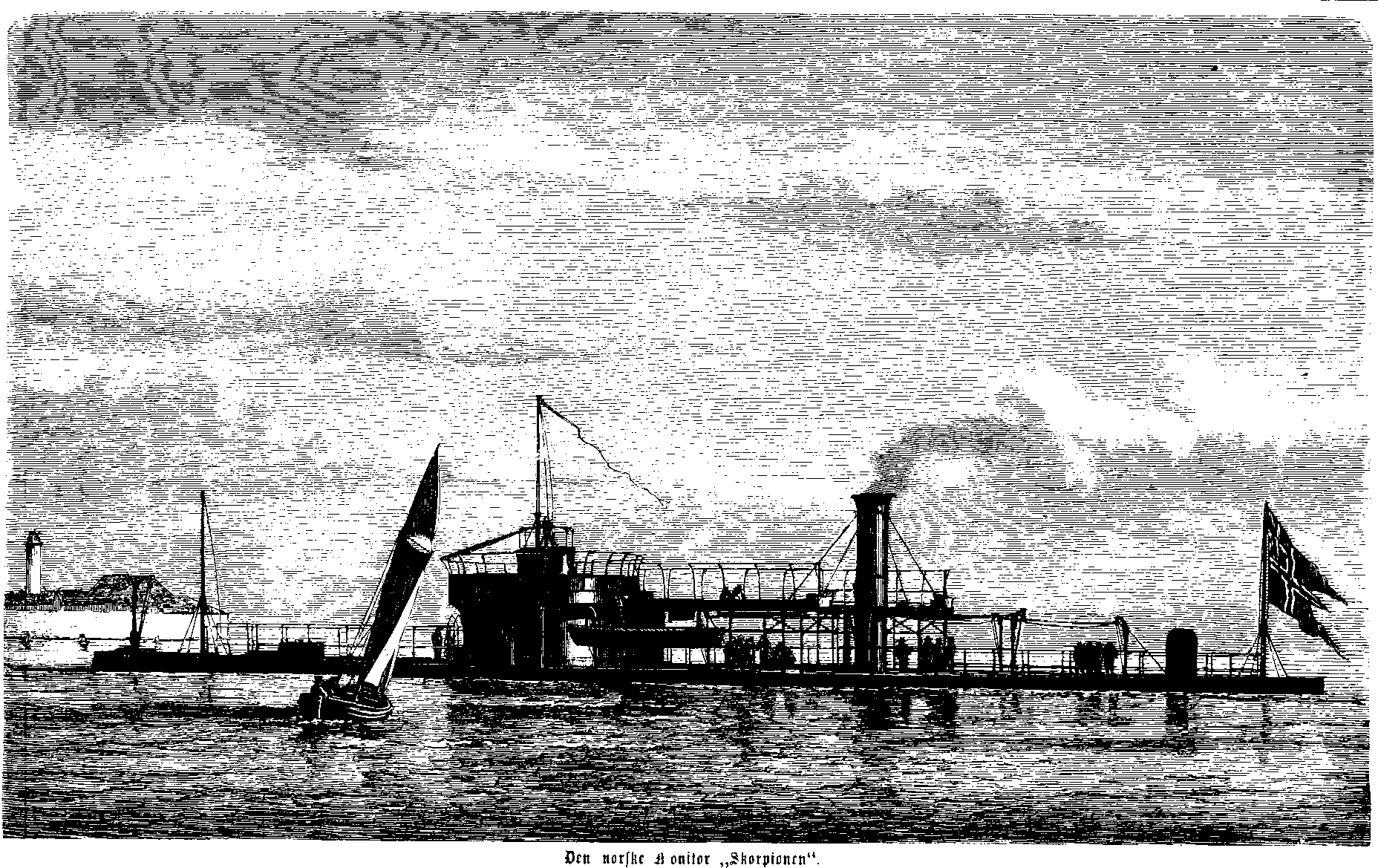
- HNoMS Skorpionen. Note extremely low freeboard and single turret, typical of this kind of warship.

Class overview
- Name: Skorpionen class
- Operators: Royal Norwegian Navy
- Preceded by: None
- Succeeded by: Thor
- Built: 1866–1869
- In commission: 1867–1908
- Completed: 3

General characteristics
- Type: Monitor
- Displacement: 1,490 long tons (1,514 t)
- Length: 62.33 m (204 ft 6 in)
- Beam: 13.68 m (44 ft 11 in)
- Draught: 3.5 m (11 ft 6 in)
- Propulsion: Coal-fired reciprocating steam engine, 450 hp (336 kW)
- Speed: 8 knots (15 km/h; 9.2 mph)
- Complement: 85
- Armament: 2 × 26.67 cm (10.50 in) RML guns
- Armour: Belt: 5 in (130 mm); Turret: 12 in (300 mm); Deck: 5 in (130 mm)

The Skorpionen-class monitors were a class of three monitors employed in the Royal Norwegian Navy. The ships were Skorpionen, Mjølner and Thrudvang. The ships were built from 1866 to 1869. they were scrapped in 1908.

== See also ==
- List of ironclads
