= HNoMS Thor (1872) =

- Plans for Thor circa 1870

History

Norway
- Name: Thor
- Namesake: Norse god of thunder Thor
- Builder: Horten Navy Yard
- Laid down: 1 January 1871
- Launched: 1872
- Decommissioned: 1918
- Fate: Wrecked 7 March 1919

General characteristics
- Displacement: 1,975 tons
- Length: 62.33m
- Beam: 14.48m
- Draught: 3.81m
- Propulsion: 600hp reciprocating steam engines
- Speed: 8.0 knop
- Complement: 95
- Armament: 2 x 10.5 inch RML guns

HNoMS Thor was a monitor built for the Royal Norwegian Navy in 1871, named after the Norse god Thor. She was decommissioned in 1918, long after her heavy guns were outdated. She was considered an improvement on the Skorpionen class of monitors, with heavier armour and a wider beam.

The earlier monitor Mjølner was named after Thor's hammer.

== Details ==
Thor was armed with two 10.5 inch rifled muzzle-loading guns in a revolving turret. She had 7 inches of iron armour on her sides, and her turret was protected by 14 inches of iron armour.

== Wreck ==
After decommissioning, Thor was to be scrapped. On 7 March 1919, while being towed to the scrapyard, the ship was caught in a storm that broke the towing cable, stranding Thor on an island outside Verdens Ende in Vestfold, and killing two crew members. Thor later sank in shallow water. A salvage operation removed parts of the ship, but the wreck remains largely intact and now lies at a depth of 8 to 14 meters southwest of Verdens Ende.

Thor is one of only three accessible monitor vessels in the world, the others being USS Monitor, which lies at about 60 meters some 42 kilometers southeast of Cape Hatteras, North Carolina and HMVS Cerberus, in 5 metres of water in Victoria, Australia.

== Notable crew ==
- Johan Oscar Smith, founder of Brunstad Christian Church served as a gunnery officer on Thor in 1898.
