= Quick-firing gun =

Artillery class capable of a high rate of fire for its given caliber

A quick-firing or rapid-firing gun is an artillery piece, typically a gun or howitzer, that has several characteristics which taken together mean the weapon can fire at a fast rate. Quick-firing was introduced worldwide in the 1880s and 1890s and had a marked impact on war both on land and at sea.

== Characteristics ==
The characteristics of a quick-firing artillery piece are:

- A breech-loading weapon with a breech mechanism that allows rapid reloading
- Single-part cased ammunition, i.e. a cartridge containing both shell and propellant
- Recoil buffers to limit recoil, so the barrel can quickly return to the same position after firing
- The use of smokeless powder – nitrocellulose, nitroglycerine, or cordite – which create far less smoke than gunpowder, meaning that gun crews could still see their target

These innovations, taken together, meant that the quick-firer could fire aimed shells much more rapidly than an older weapon. For instance, an Elswick Ordnance Company 4.7-inch gun fired 10 rounds in 47.5 seconds in 1887, almost eight times faster than the equivalent 5-inch breech-loading gun.

== History ==
=== Naval use ===
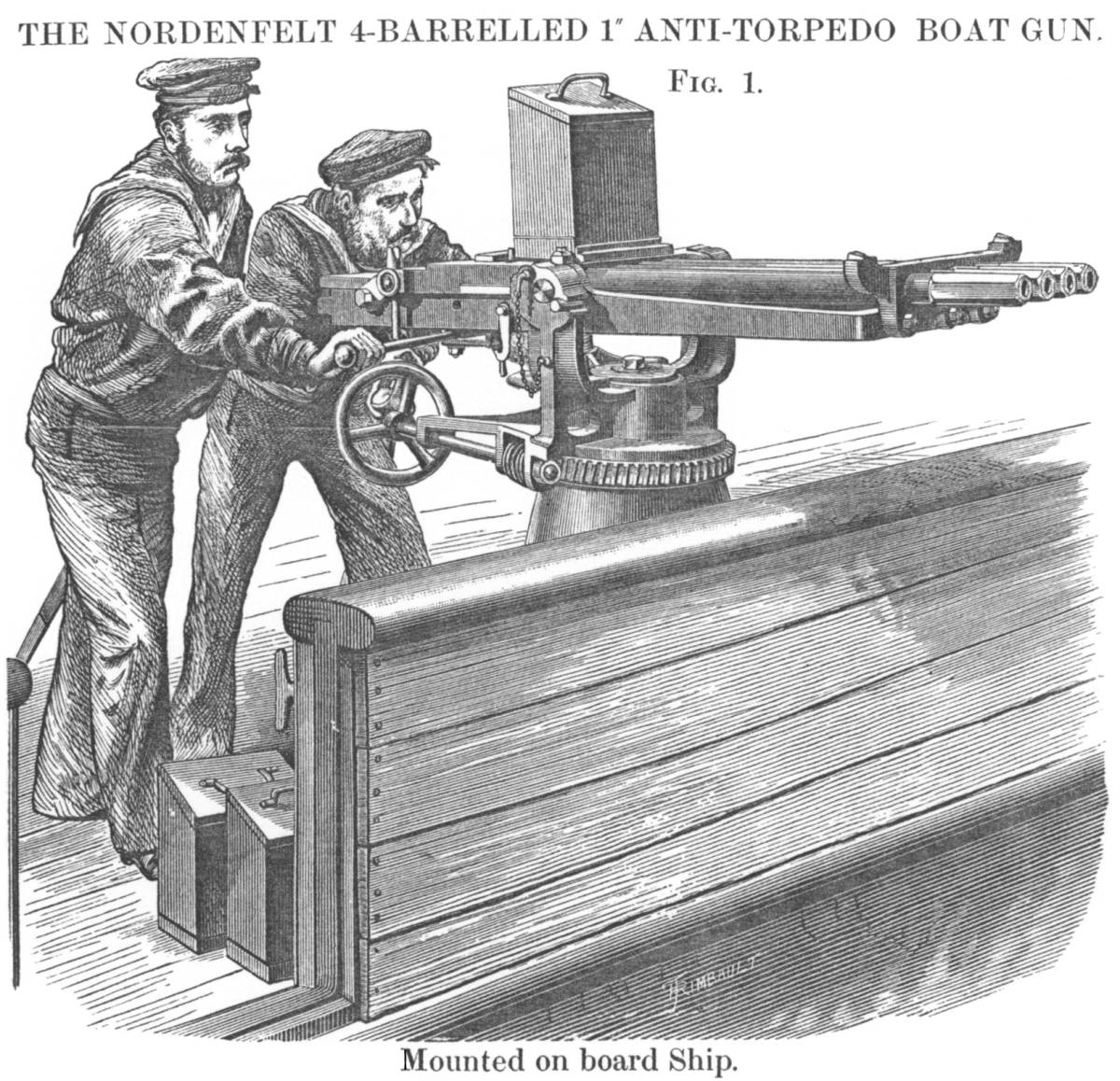
Woodcut depicting Royal Navy gunners in action with the 1-inch Nordenfelt gun, the first practical QF gun

In 1881, the Royal Navy advertised for a quick-firing gun that could fire a minimum of 12 shots per minute. This rate of fire became increasingly important with the development of the first practical torpedoes and torpedo boats, which posed an extreme threat to the Royal Navy's maritime predominance.

The first quick-firing light gun was the 1-inch Nordenfelt gun, built in Britain from 1880. The gun was expressly designed to defend larger warships against the new small fast-moving torpedo boats in the late 1870s to the early 1880s and was an enlarged version of the successful rifle-calibre Nordenfelt hand-cranked "machine gun" designed by Helge Palmcrantz. The gun fired a solid steel bullet with hardened tip and brass jacket.

The gun was used in one-, two-, and four-barrel versions. The ammunition was fed by gravity from a hopper above the breech, subdivided into separate columns for each barrel. The gunner loaded and fired the multiple barrels by moving a lever on the right side of the gun forward and backwards. Pulling the lever backwards extracted the fired cartridges, pushing it forward then loaded fresh cartridges into all the barrels, and the final part of the forward motion fired all the barrels, one at a time in quick succession. Hence the gun functioned as a type of volley gun, firing bullets in bursts, compared to the contemporary Gatling gun and the true machine guns that succeeded it, such as the Maxim gun, which fired at a steady continuous rate.

It was superseded for anti-torpedo boat defence in the mid-1880s by the new generation of Hotchkiss and Nordenfelt "QF" guns of 47 mm and 57 mm calibre, firing exploding "common pointed" shells weighing 3–6 lb (1.4–2.7 kg).

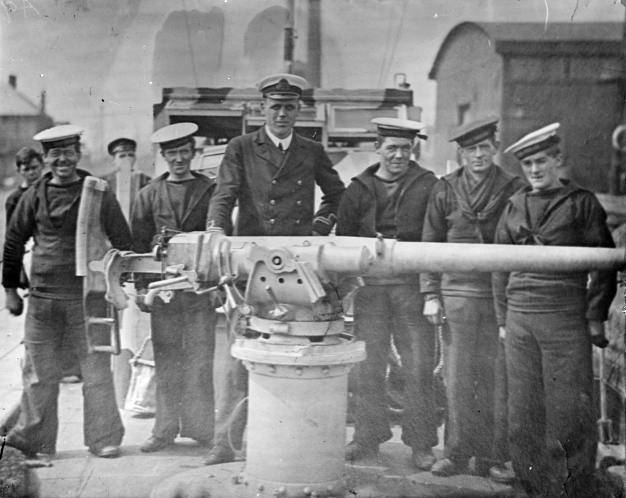
Royal Navy deck mounting of the QF 3-pounder Hotchkiss, the first modern QF gun, 1915

The French firm Hotchkiss produced the QF 3 pounder as a light 47 mm naval gun from 1886. The gun was ideal for defending against small fast vessels such as torpedo boats and was immediately adopted by the RN as the "Ordnance QF 3 pounder Hotchkiss". It was built under licence by Elswick Ordnance Company.

The Royal Navy introduced the QF 4.7-inch in HMS Sharpshooter in 1889, and the QF 6-inch MK 1 in HMS Royal Sovereign, launched 1891. Other navies followed suit; the French navy installed quick-firing weapons on its ships completed in 1894–95.

Quick-firing guns were a key characteristic of the pre-dreadnought battleship, the dominant design of the 1890s. The quick-firing guns, while unable to penetrate thick armour, were intended to destroy the superstructure of an opposing battleship, start fires, and kill or distract the enemy's gun crews. The development of heavy guns and their increasing rate of fire meant that the quick-firer lost its status as the decisive weapon of naval combat in the early 1900s, though quick-firing guns were vital to defend battleships from attack by torpedo boats and destroyers, and formed the main armament of smaller vessels.

=== Land use ===
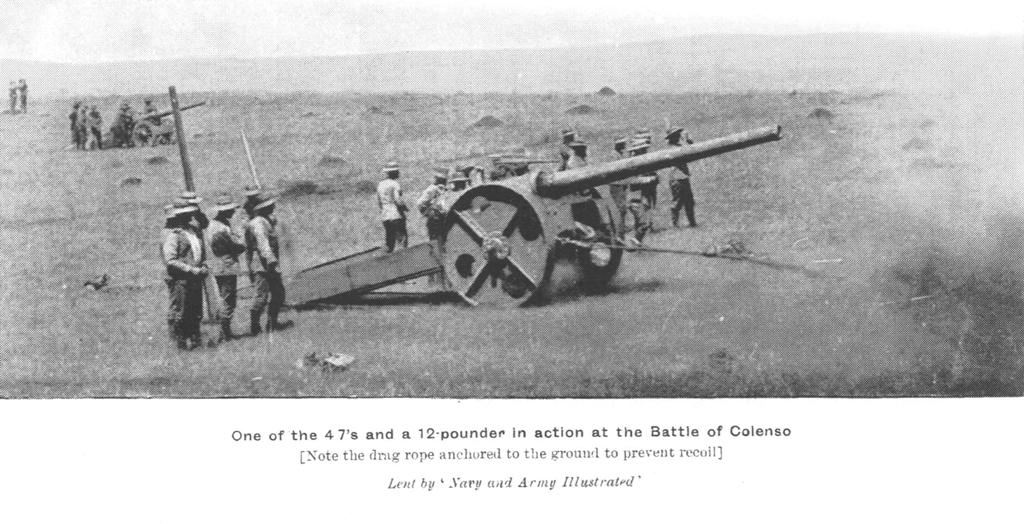
Quick-firing 4.7-inch gun on "Percy Scott" carriage at the Battle of Colenso

An early quick-firing field gun was created by Vladimir Baranovsky in 1872–75. which was officially adopted by the Russian military in 1882. On land, quick-firing field guns were first adopted by the French Army, starting in 1897 with the Canon de 75 modèle 1897, which proved to be extremely successful. Other nations were quick to copy the quick-firing technology.

The QF 4.7-inch Gun Mk I–IV was initially manufactured for naval use and as coast artillery. British forces in the Second Boer War were initially outgunned by the long-range Boer artillery. Captain Percy Scott of HMS Terrible first improvised timber static siege mountings for two 4.7-inch (120 mm) guns from the Cape Town coastal defences, to counter the Boers' "Long Tom" gun during the Siege of Ladysmith in 1899–1900.

Scott then improvised a travelling carriage for 4.7-inch guns removed from their usual static coastal or ship mountings to provide the army with a heavy field gun. These improvised carriages lacked recoil buffers and hence in action drag shoes and attachment of the carriage by cable to a strong point in front of the gun were necessary to control the recoil. They were manned by Royal Navy crews and required up to 32 oxen to move.

The first war in which quick-firing artillery was widespread was the Russo-Japanese War of 1904–05.

The quick-firing howitzer offered the potential for practical indirect fire. Traditional howitzers had been employed to engage targets outside their line of fire, but were very slow to aim and reload. Quick-firing weapons were capable of a heavy indirect bombardment, and this was the main mode of their employment during the 20th century.

== See also ==
- Glossary of British ordnance terms
