= HNoMS Mjølner =

Norwegian John Ericsson-class vessel

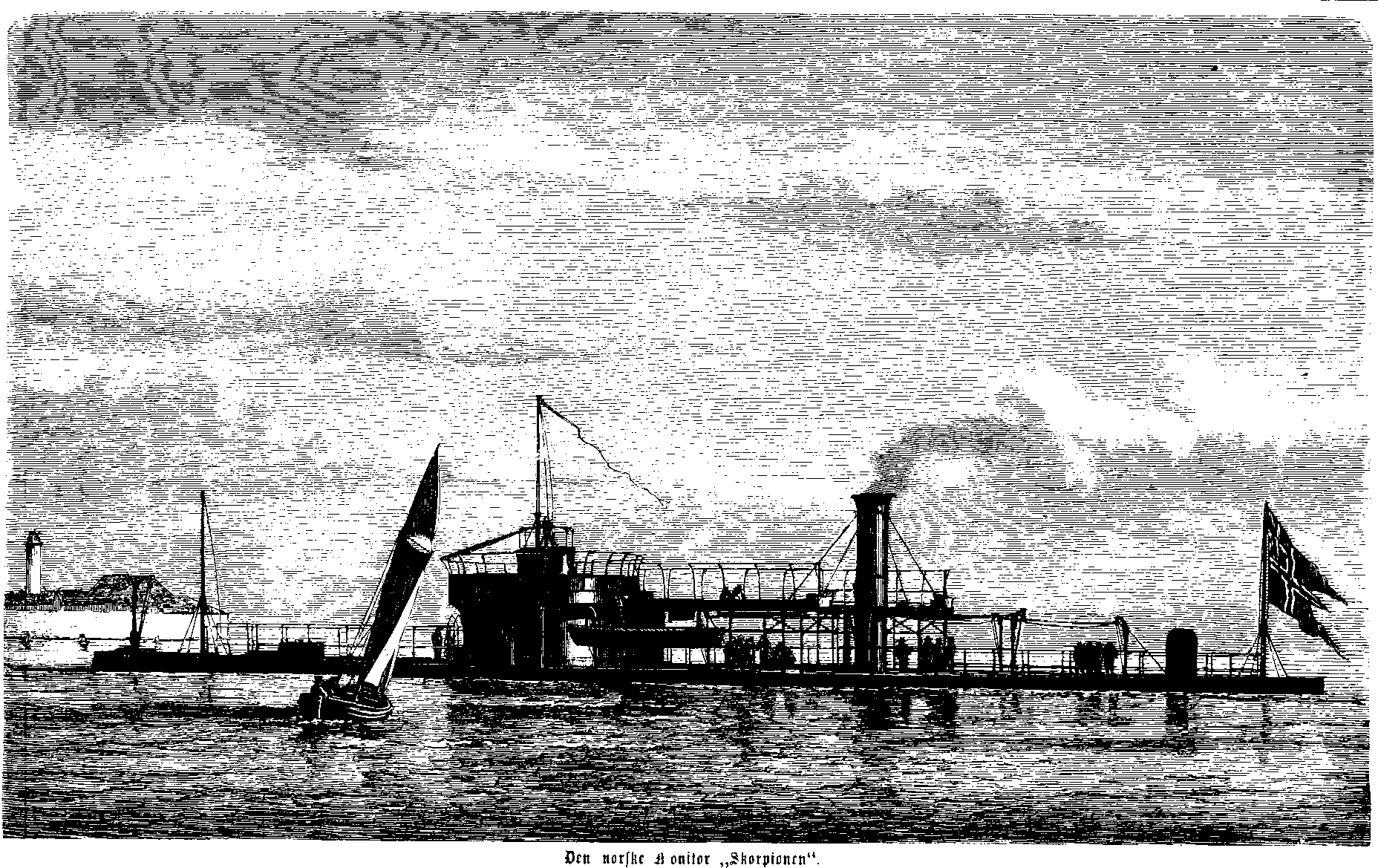
- Drawing of Mjølner's sister Skorpionen

History

Norway
- Name: HNoMS Mjølner
- Namesake: Mjöllnir
- Operator: Royal Norwegian Navy
- Ordered: 1867
- Builder: Motala Verkstad, Norrköping
- Cost: 1,102,000 Norwegian krone
- Laid down: 1867
- Launched: 1868
- Completed: 7 September 1868
- Fate: Scrapped, 1909

General characteristics
- Class & type: John Ericsson-class monitor
- Displacement: 1,501 metric tons (1,477 long tons)
- Length: 60.88 m (199 ft 9 in)
- Beam: 13.54 m (44 ft 5 in)
- Draft: 3.4 m (11 ft 2 in)
- Installed power: 380 ihp (280 kW)
- Propulsion: 1 shaft, 1 Vibrating lever steam engine, 4 cylindrical boilers
- Speed: 6.5 knots (12.0 km/h; 7.5 mph)
- Range: 950 nautical miles (1,760 km; 1,090 mi)
- Complement: 80–104
- Armament: 2 × 270 mm (10.6 in) Armstrong guns
- Armor: Belt: 124 mm (4.9 in); Gun turret: 270 mm (11 in); Deck: 24.6 mm (1.0 in); Conning tower: 225 mm (8.9 in)

HNoMS Mjølner, named after the hammer of the god Thor, was the fourth of five ships of the John Ericsson-class monitors built for the Royal Swedish Navy and the Royal Norwegian Navy in the mid-1860s. Influenced by the use of ironclads during the American Civil War, the design was based on that of USS Monitor. They were designed under the supervision of the Swedish-born inventor John Ericsson—coincidentally designer of Monitor—and built in Sweden. Mjølner was delivered in 1868. She ran aground the following year, without serious damage, and reconstructed in 1897 with later breech-loading guns. Mjølner was sold for scrap in 1909.

== Design and description ==
The John Ericsson-class ironclads were designed to meet the need of the Swedish and Norwegian Navies for small, shallow-draft armored ships capable of defending their coastal waters. The standoff between USS Monitor and the much larger CSS Virginia during the Battle of Hampton Roads in, early 1862, roused much interest in Sweden in this new type of warship, as it seemed ideal for coastal defense duties. John Ericsson, designer and builder of Monitor, born in Sweden—although becoming an American citizen in 1848—offered to share his design with the Swedes. In response, they sent Lieutenant John Christian d'Ailly to the United States to study monitor design and construction under Ericsson. D'Ailly arrived in July 1862 and toured rolling mills, gun foundries, and visited several different ironclads under construction. He returned to Sweden in 1863 having completed the drawings of a Monitor-type ship under Ericsson's supervision.

The ship was 60.88 meters (199 ft 9 in) long overall, with a beam of 13.54 meters (44 ft 5 in). She had a draft of 3.4 meters (11 ft 2 in) and displaced 1,522 metric tons (1,498 long tons). Mjølner was divided into nine main compartments by eight watertight bulkheads. Over time a flying bridge and, later, a full superstructure, was added to each ship between the gun turret and the funnel. Initially her crew numbered 80 officers and men, but this increased to 104 as she was modified with additional weapons.

=== Propulsion ===
The John Ericsson-class ships had one twin-cylinder vibrating lever steam engines, designed by Ericsson himself, driving a single four-bladed, 3.74-meter (12 ft 3 in) propeller. Their engines were powered by four fire-tube boilers at a working pressure of 40 psi (276 kPa; 3 kgf/cm^{2}). The engines produced a total of 380 indicated horsepower (280 kW) which gave the monitors a maximum speed of 6.5 knots (12.0 km/h; 7.5 mph) in calm waters. The ships carried 110 tonnes (110 long tons) of coal, enough for six day's steaming.

=== Armament ===
Mjølner was initially armed with a pair of Armstrong 270-millimeter (10.6 in) rifled muzzle-loading guns. Each gun was constructed of steel and weighed 18.5 long tons (18.8 t). The ship also carried an 80-millimeter (3.1 in) gun. During Mjølner's reconstruction in 1897 her gun turret was fixed in place and modified to serve as a barbette for her two new breech-loading Cockerill 120-millimeter (4.7 in) guns. She also received two 124-millimeter (4.9 in) and 65-millimeter (2.6 in) Cockerill guns mounted in her superstructure. In addition two 37-millimeter (1.5 in) Hotchkiss 5-barrel revolving guns were mounted in the superstructure. They fired a shell weighing about 1.1 lb (0.50 kg) at a muzzle velocity of about 2,000 ft/s (610 m/s), for a range of about 3,500 yards (3,200 m), with a rate of fire of about 30 rounds per minute.

=== Armor ===
The John Ericsson-class ships had a complete waterline armor belt of wrought iron 1.8 meters (5 ft 11 in) high and 124 millimeters (4.9 in) thick. The armor consisted of five plates backed by 91 millimeters (3.6 in) of wood. The lower edge of this belt was three plates (74.2 millimeters (2.9 in)) thick. The maximum thickness of the armored deck was 24.7 millimeters (1.0 in) in two layers. The gun turret's armor consisted of twelve layers of iron, totalling 270 millimeters (10.6 in) in thickness on the first four monitors. The inside of the turret was lined with mattresses to catch splinters. The base of the turret was protected with a 127-millimeter (5.0 in) glacis, 520 millimeters (20.5 in) high, and the turret's roof was 127 millimeters thick. The conning tower was positioned on top of the turret and its sides were ten layers (250 millimeters (9.8 in)) thick. The funnel was protected by six layers of armor with a total thickness of 120 millimeters (4.7 in) up to half its height.

== Service ==
The Norwegians had built one monitor-type ship of their own, Skorpionen, in 1865, and laid down several others, but the Norwegian Parliament authorized construction of Mjølner in 1867 in Sweden at the cost of 1,102,000 Norwegian krone. (Note: The exact relationship between the Norwegian Skorpionen class and the John Ericsson class is unclear. Harris 1994 says that the Skorpionen class merely had five, instead of four, boilers and were otherwise identical, see p. 34. But Gardiner cites slightly different dimensions and counts Mjølner as part of the class, see p. 368, as does Silverstone, p. 350) She was launched in 1868 and completed on 7 September of that year. Mjølner ran aground at Kragerø on 21 June 1869, and could not be pulled off the rocks until the ship's ammunition, iron ballast and 120 long tons (120 t) of coal were removed. Her repairs were completed on 7 July 1869 by the Royal Dockyard at Horten, at the cost of 5,000 krone. The court of inquiry found the ship's commander and the pilot liable for the repairs, but the parliament released the two from their obligation two years later. She was visited by King Charles XV of Sweden when visiting one of Sweden's west-coast ports in the early 1870s. Mjølner was laid up after her refit in 1897, but was mobilized during 1905 when the personal union between Sweden and Norway was dissolved. She returned to reserve afterward, and was sold for scrap in 1909.
