= HNoMS Skorpionen =

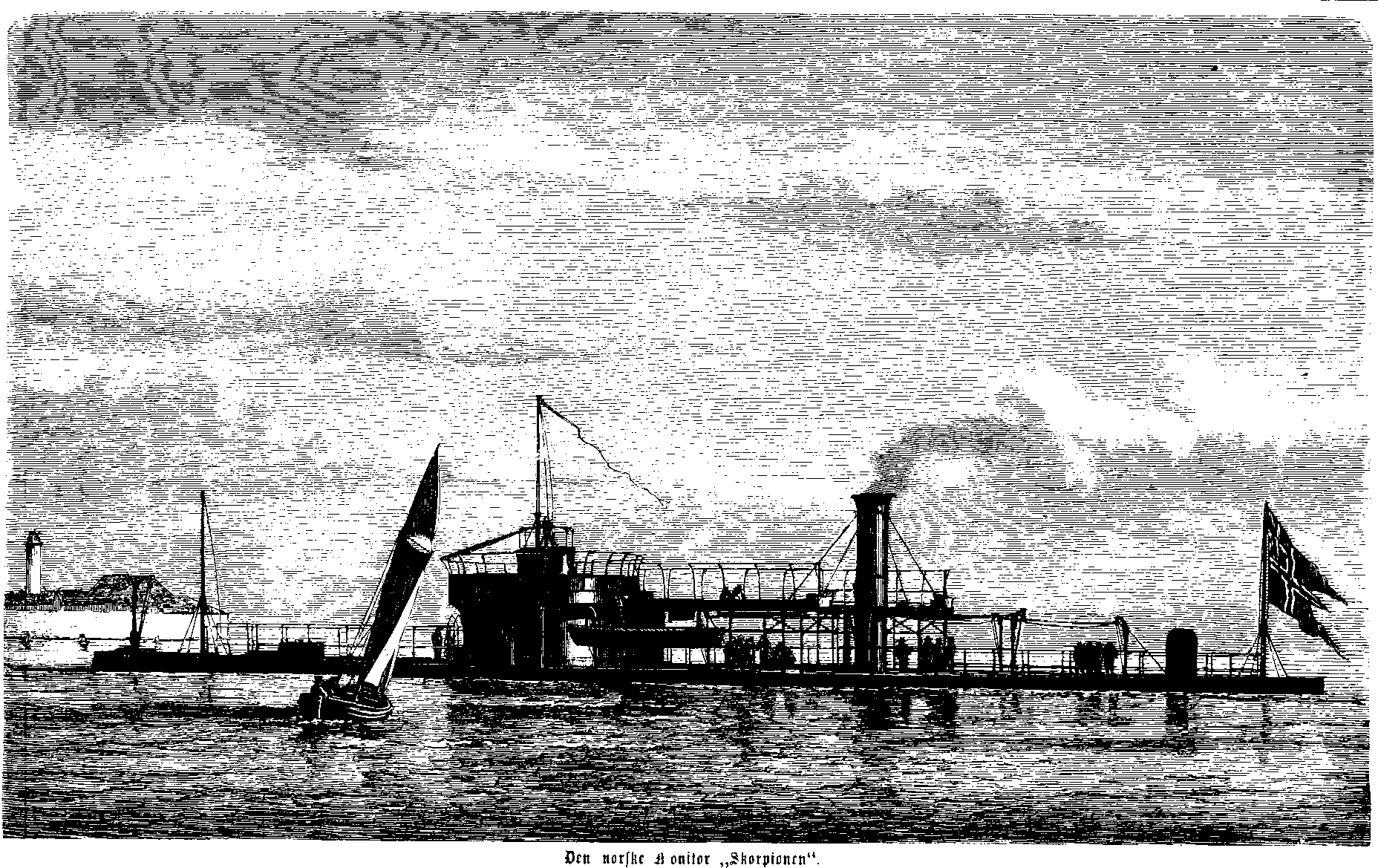
- Skorpionen

History

Norway Ship flag=
- Name: Skorpionen
- Laid down: 1865
- Launched: 1866
- Fate: Scrapped, 1908

General characteristics
- Class & type: Skorpionen-class monitor
- Displacement: 1,490 long tons (1,514 t)
- Length: 62.33 m (204 ft 6 in)
- Beam: 13.68 m (44 ft 11 in)
- Draught: 3.5 m (11 ft 6 in)
- Propulsion: Steam engine, 450 ihp (336 kW)
- Speed: 8 knots (15 km/h; 9.2 mph)
- Complement: 85
- Armament: 2 × 26.67 cm (10.5 in) RML guns
- Armour: Deck: 5 in (127 mm); Gun turret: 12 in (305 mm)

HNoMS Skorpionen was the lead ship of her class of three monitors built for the Royal Norwegian Navy in the 1860s. She was scrapped in 1908, well after her muzzle-loading guns were outdated.

The two other ships in her class was Mjølner and Thrudvang. The slightly later Thor can be seen as an improved Skorpionen-class monitor.

The name translates as The Scorpion.

== Details ==
Skorpionen was armed with two heavy rifled muzzle-loaders in a revolving turret. She had five inches of iron armour on her deck, and her turret was protected by twelve inches of iron armour.
