= 1-inch Nordenfelt gun =

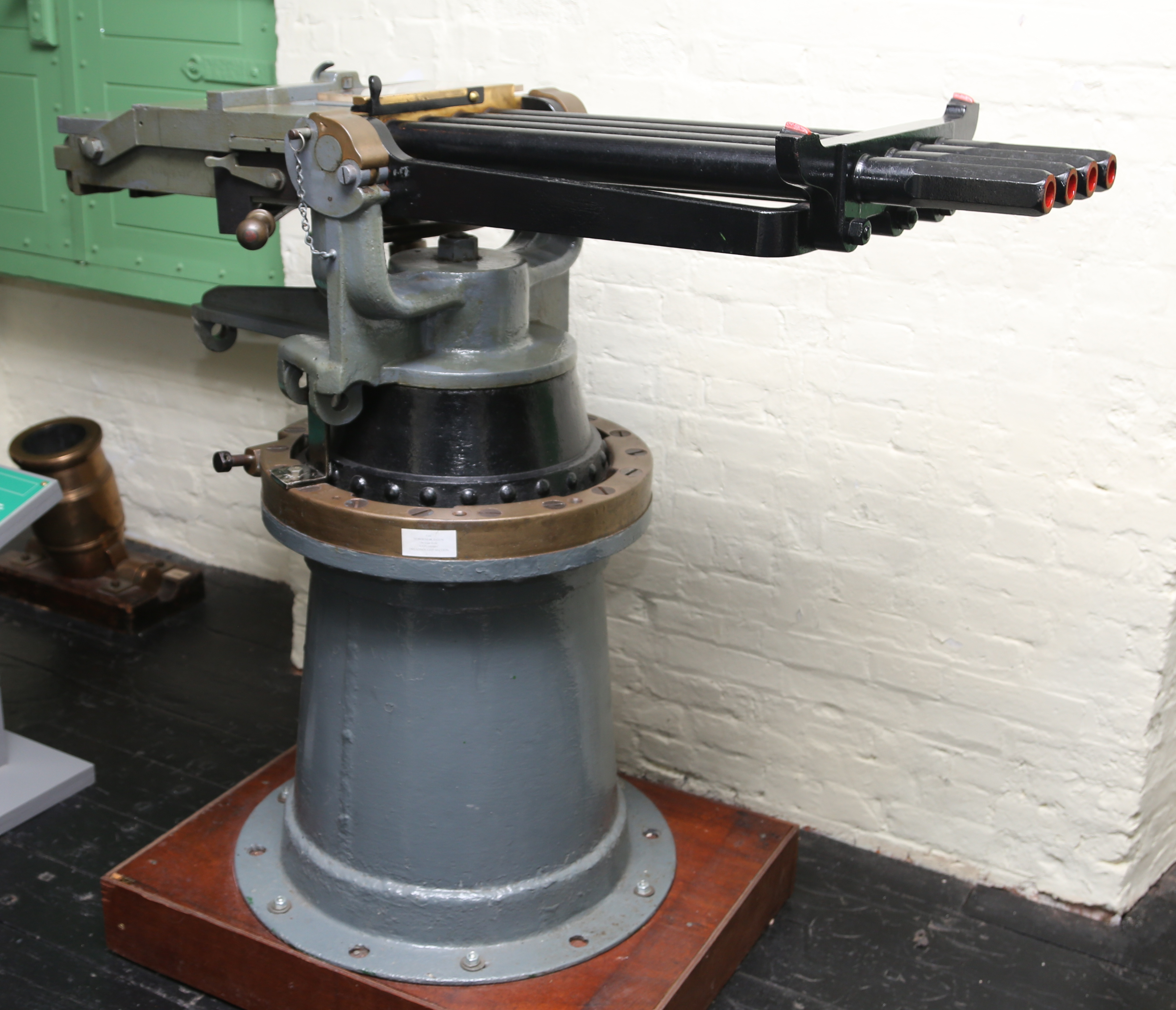
- Four-barrel version
- Type: Naval gun
- Place of origin: United Kingdom

Service history
- In service: 1880–1890s
- Used by: Many navies

Production history
- Designer: Helge Palmcrantz
- Manufacturer: Nordenfelt Guns and Ammunition Company

Specifications
- Mass: 447 pounds (203 kg)
- Barrel length: 35.48 inches (901 mm)
- Shell: 7.25 ounces (0.206 kg) solid steel bullet with brass jacket
- Calibre: 1-inch (25.40 mm)
- Muzzle velocity: 1,464 feet per second (446 m/s)

The 1-inch Nordenfelt gun was an early quick-firing light gun intended to defend larger warships against the new small fast-moving torpedo boats in the late 1870s to the 1890s.

== Description ==
The gun was an enlarged version of the successful rifle-calibre Nordenfelt hand-cranked "machine gun" designed by Helge Palmcrantz and was intended to combine its rapid rate of fire with a projectile capable of deterring attacking torpedo boats. The gun fired a solid steel bullet with hardened tip and brass jacket: under the terms of the St. Petersburg Declaration of 1868, exploding shells weighing less than 400 grams were not allowed to be used in warfare between the signatory nations.

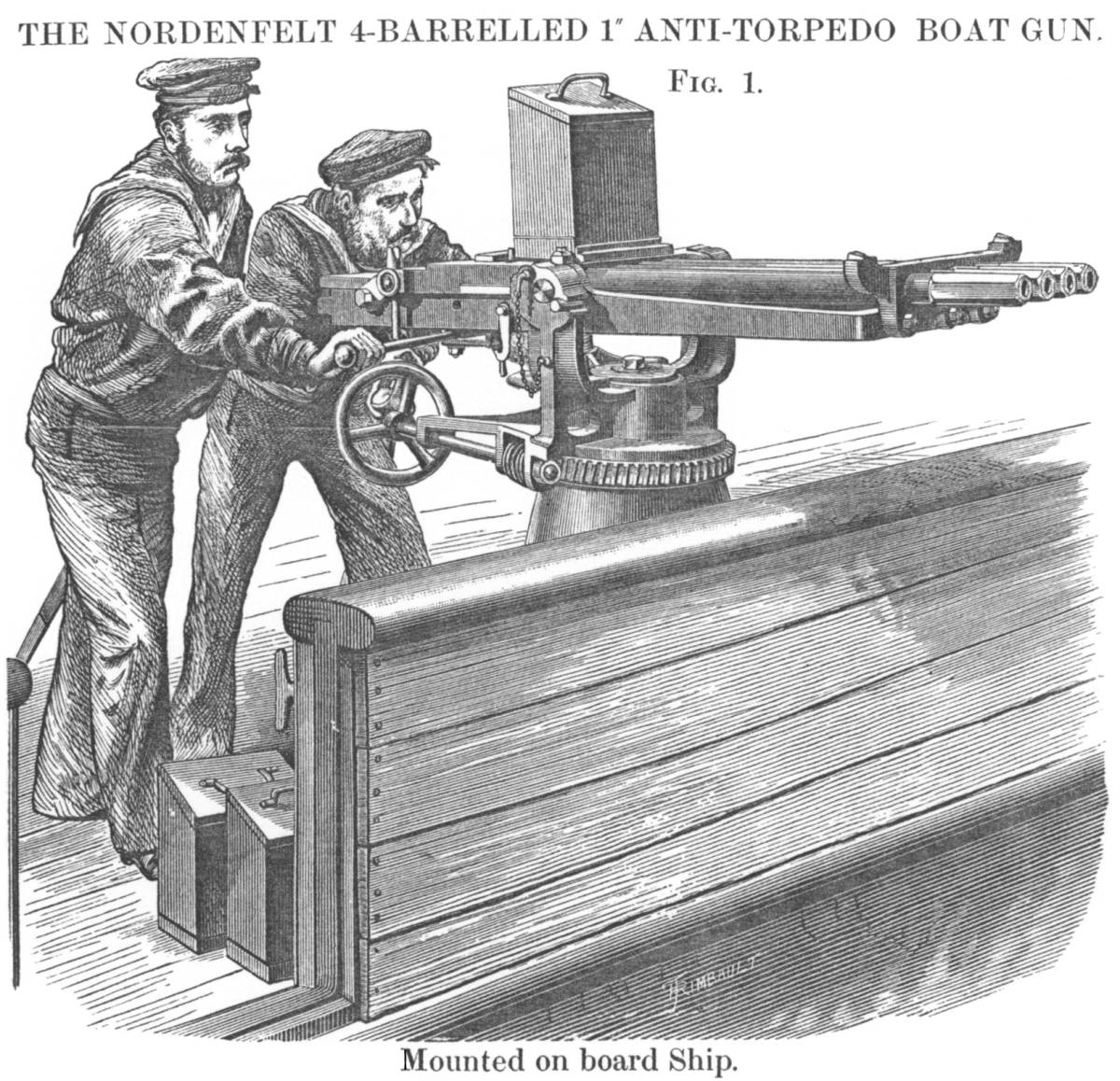
Woodcut depicting Royal Navy gunners in action with four-barrel model. The gun captain, left, is operating the training handwheel

The gun was used in one, two and four-barrel versions. The ammunition was fed by gravity from a hopper above the breech subdivided into separate columns for each barrel. The gunner loaded and fired the multiple barrels by moving a lever on the right side of the gun forward and backwards. Pulling the lever backwards extracted the fired cartridges, pushing it forward then loaded fresh cartridges into all the barrels, and the final part of the forward motion fired all the barrels, one at a time in quick succession. Hence the gun functioned as a type of volley gun, firing bullets in bursts, compared to the contemporary Gatling gun and the true machine guns which succeeded it such as the Maxim gun, which fired at a steady continuous rate.

The gunner was occupied with manually operating the loading and firing lever, while the gun captain aimed the gun and operated the elevation and training handwheels.

== Ammunition ==
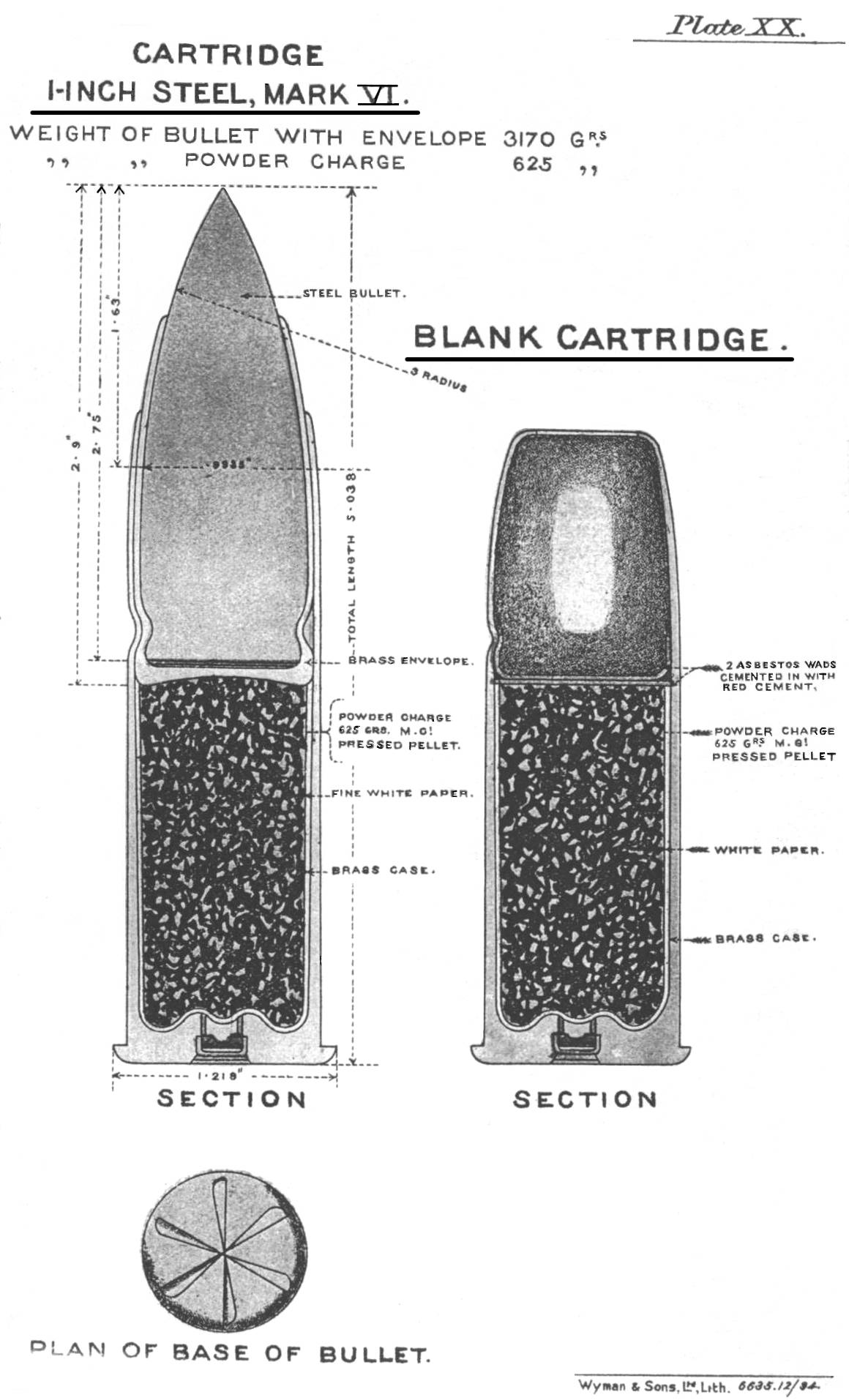
British Mk VI round (left) and blank round (right)

== Surviving examples ==
- A 4-barreled gun at United States Army Ordnance Museum, MD, USA
- A 4-barreled gun in The Gardens, Bundaberg, Queensland, Australia
- A 2-barreled gun in The Gardens, Bundaberg, Queensland, Australia
- A 2-barreled gun at Queens Park, Maryborough, Queensland, Australia
- A 2-barrelled gun at the Australian War Memorial museum, Canberra ACT Australia.
- A 4-barrelled gun at the Tower of London
- A 5-barrelled gun at Chatham Historic Dockyard
- A 2-barreled 1in gun at the QEII Army Memorial Museum Waiouru New Zealand.
- A 4-barrelled 25mm gun at the Royal Norwegian Navy Museum in Horten.

== See also ==
- List of naval guns

== Bibliography ==
- Text Book of Gunnery, 1887. LONDON: PRINTED FOR HIS MAJESTY'S STATIONERY OFFICE, BY HARRISON AND SONS, ST. MARTIN'S LANE
