= Helge Palmcrantz =

Swedish firearms designer

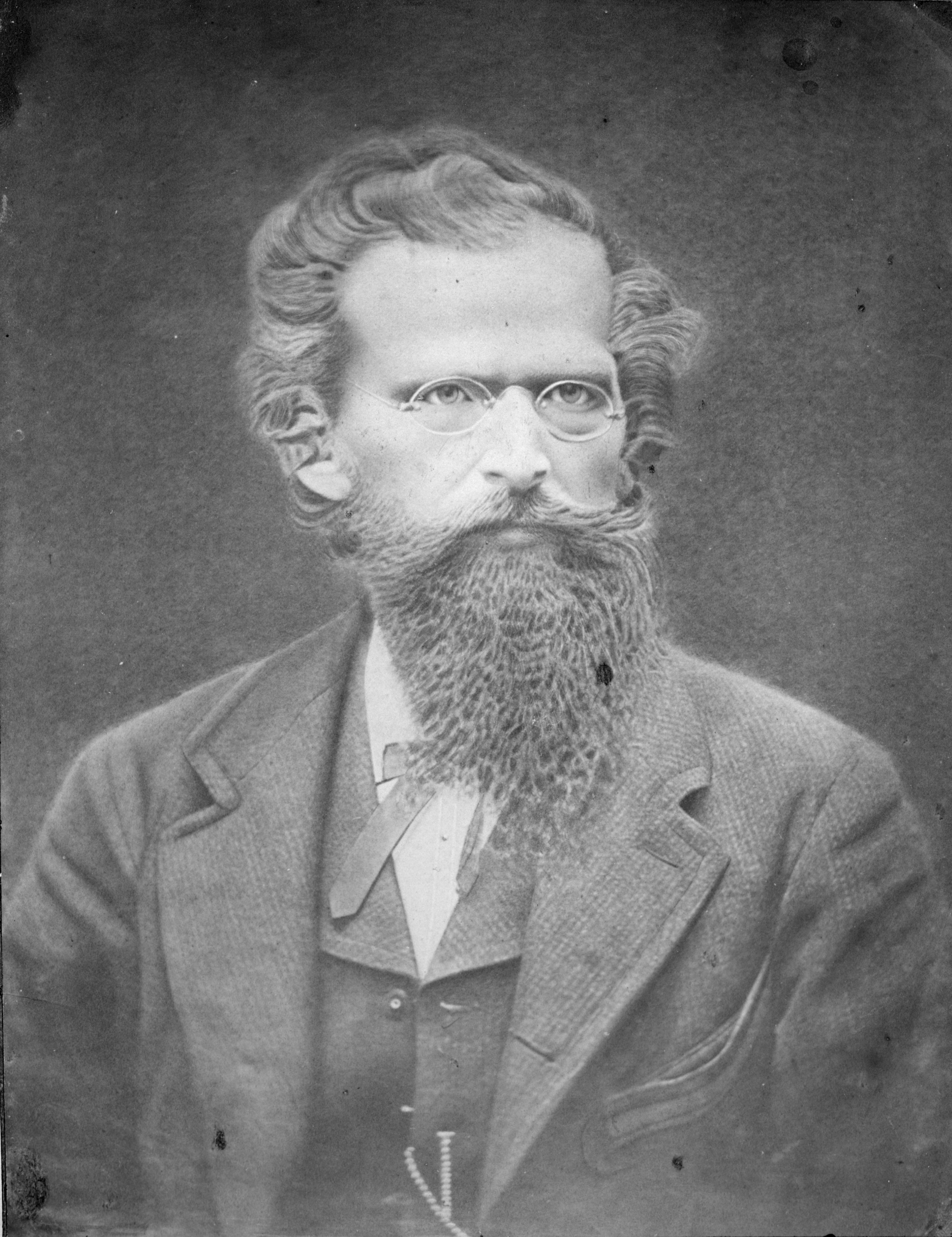
- Born: Carl Helge Julius Palmcrantz; July 7, 1842; Hammerdal, Sweden
- Died: November 22, 1880 (aged 38); Stockholm, Sweden
- Occupations: Inventor, Firearms designer
- Spouse: Susanna Josephina Winborg

Helge Palmcrantz (July 7, 1842 – November 22, 1880) was a Swedish inventor and industrialist.

== Biography ==
Palmcrantz was born at Hammerdal in Jämtland, Sweden. He was the son of Per Gustaf Palmcrantz (1806–1905) and Lovisa Ulrika Nordenmark. His father was a captain in the Jämtland Ranger Regiment. He was enlisted as a cadet in his father's regiment, where he worked doing land surveying. After a couple of years he left the regiment to study at the Technological Institute of Stockholm, later known as KTH Royal Institute of Technology.

In partnership with his brother-in-law, Theodor Winborg (1832–1918), Palmcrantz founded a small workshop on Vollmar Yxkullsgatan 25, Södermalm, Stockholm. As number of employees increased along with the production volume, he moved to a new factory on Kungsholmen, Stockholm, where they manufactured firearms, reaping machines, mowers and other agricultural equipment of their own design. The Palmcrantz factory, Palmcrantzska Fabriken, would later be built on Lövholmen, Stockholm.

In 1868, the first version of his machine gun was finished and a demonstration of its capacity was held on Ladugårdsgärdet, Stockholm in front of the Swedish Defense Minister; G. R. Abel. After a couple of modifications and improvements, he patented the multi-barrel, lever-actuated, machine gun and it was bought into the Swedish army. The same year, the machine-gun was exhibited at the 1873 Vienna World's Fair.

To reach international success, Palmcrantz met industrialist Thorsten Nordenfelt (1842–1920) in 1875 and the latter's company became his British agent. They agreed to market the machine gun under the then well known Nordenfelt brand and his second model would later be known as the Nordenfelt machine gun after his financial backer. It was Nordenfelt who convinced Palmcrantz to increase the caliber of his gun to one inch, making it a suitable weapon for use against the growing threat of torpedo boats.

Palmcrantz succumbed to an early death from a bleeding ulcer. He was buried at Norra Begravningsplatsen in Stockholm.

Helge Palmcrantz has a former school named after him, Palmcrantzskolan in Östersund. The block names "Kulsprutan" and "Lavetten" on Kungsholmen are named after his factories at Hantverkargatan.
