= List of historic ships of the Swedish Navy =

Ships of the
Swedish Navy
Capital ships
Coastal defence ships
Corvettes
Cruisers
Destroyers
Frigates
Mine warfare vessels
Monitors
Patrol vessels
Gunboats
Sloops of war
Submarines
Torpedo boats

This is a list of historic ships of the Swedish Navy.

== Auxiliary ships ==
- HSwMS Barbara, later Hjälparen, stricken 1962
- HSwMS Belos, broken up 1960s
- HSwMS Belos, stricken 1993
- HSwMS Arkösund (12), was previously the minelayer MUL 12
- HSwMS Grundsund (15), was previously the minelayer MUL 15
- HSwMS Orion (A201)
- HSwMS Boren (A211)
- HSwMS Ägir (A212)
- HSwMS Nordanö (A213)
- HSwMS Belos (A214)
- HSwMS Unden (A216)
- HSwMS Fryken (A217)
- HSwMS Freja (A221)
- HSwMS Brännaren (A228)
- HSwMS Eldaren (A229)
- HSwMS Lommen (A231)
- HSwMS Spoven (A232)
- HSwMS Fällaren (A236)
- HSwMS Minören (A237)
- HSwMS Urd (A241)
- HSwMS Skuld (A242)
- HSwMS Hägern (A246)
- HSwMS Pelikanen (A247)
- HSwMS Pingvinen (A248)
- HSwMS Achilles (A251)
- HSwMS Ajax (A252)
- HSwMS Hermes (A253)
- HSwMS Hector (A254)
- HSwMS Hercules (A255)
- HSwMS Sigrun (A256)
- HSwMS Utö (A261)
- HSwMS Skredsvik (A262)
- HSwMS Gålö (A263)
- HSwMS Trossö (A264)
- HSwMS Visborg (A265)
- HSwMS Tankaren (A268)
- HSwMS Meranda (A313)
- HSwMS Furusund (A320), previously (MUL 20) and (20)
- HSwMS Heros (A322)
- HSwMS Hercules (A323)
- HSwMS Beckholmen (A324)
- HSwMS Hera (A324)
- HSwMS Willy (A325)
- HSwMS Hebe (A326)
- HSwMS Passopp (A327)
- HSwMS Ran (A328)
- HSwMS Henrik (A329)
- HSwMS Atlas (A330)
- HSwMS Skagul (A333)
- HSwMS Vitsgarn (A336)
- HSwMS Sleipner (A343)
- HSwMS Loke (A344)
- HSwMS Granaten (A345)
- HSwMS Edda (A347)
- HSwMS Gerda (A349)
- HSwMS Nåttarö (A608)
- HSwMS Ambjörn (A610)
- HSwMS Elon (A701)
- HSwMS Tyr (A702)
- HSwMS Viking (A751)
- HSwMS Willy (A752)
- HSwMS Ran (A753)
- HSwMS Marieholm, renamed SS Marieholm.

== Battleships ==
- HSwMS Karl XIV Johan, launched 1824
- HSwMS Stockholm, launched 1856

== Coastal defence ships ==
- Svea class
  - Svea (1885) - retired in 1941
  - Göta (1889) - retired in 1923
  - Thule (1893) - retired in 1923
- Oden class
  - Oden (1896) - retired in 1937
  - Thor (1898) - retired in 1937
  - Niord (1898) - retired in 1922
- Dristigheten (1900) - stricken in 1947 and broken up 1961
- Äran class
  - Äran (1901) - stricken in 1947 and broken up 1961
  - Wasa (1901) - stricken in 1940 and broken up 1961
  - Tapperheten (1901) - stricken in 1947 and broken up 1952
  - Manligheten (1903) - stricken in 1950 and pontoon 1956
- Oscar II (1905) - stricken in 1950 and broken up 1974
- Sverige class
  - Sverige (1915) - stricken in 1953 and broken up 1958
  - Drottning Victoria (1917) - stricken in 1957 and broken up 1960
  - Gustav V (1918) - stricken in 1957 and broken up 1970

== Cruisers ==
Örnen class

- HSwMS Örnen, sunk as target 1950
- HSwMS Claes Horn, sold for breaking up 1924
- HSwMS Jacob Bagge, sold 1949, broken up 1951
- HSwMS Psilander, sunk as target 1939
- HSwMS Claes Uggla, sunk 1917

Tre Kronor class

- HSwMS Tre Kronor launched 1944, stricken 1964
- HSwMS Göta Lejon launched 1945, sold to Chile 1971

Others

- HSwMS Fylgia, sold 1957, broken up
- HSwMS Clas Fleming, stricken 1959, broken up 1961
- HSwMS Gotland, stricken 1960, broken up 1962

== Destroyers ==
Ehrensköld class

- HSwMS Ehrensköld (11), stricken 1963
- HSwMS Nordenskjöld (12), stricken 1963

Psilander class

- HSwMS Psilander (18) (ex-Giovanni Nicotera), stricken 1947, broken up 1949
- HSwMS Puke (19) (ex-Bettino Ricasoli), stricken 1947, broken up 1949

Klas Horn class

- HSwMS Klas Horn (3), stricken 1958
- HSwMS Klas Uggla (6), sunk 1941

Romulus class

- HSwMS Romulus (27) (ex-Spica), stricken 1958
- HSwMS Remus (28) (ex-Astore), stricken 1958

Halland class

- HSwMS Halland (J18)
- HSwMS Småland (J19)

Östergötland class

- HSwMS Östergötland (J20)
- HSwMS Södermanland (J21)
- HSwMS Gästrikland (J22)
- HSwMS Hälsingland (J23)

Öland class

- HSwMS Öland (J16)
- HSwMS Uppland (J17)

Visby class

- HSwMS Visby (J11)
- HSwMS Sundsvall (J12)
- HSwMS Hälsingborg (J13)
- HSwMS Kalmar (J14)

Göteborg class

- HSwMS Göteborg (J5)
- HSwMS Stockholm (J6)
- HSwMS Malmö (J7)
- HSwMS Karlskrona (J8)
- HSwMS Gävle (J9)
- HSwMS Norrköping (J10)

Wrangel class

- HSwMS Wrangel (25), formerly (9), stricken 1947, sunk as target 1960
- HSwMS Wachtmeister (10), stricken 1947, broken up 1951

Mode class

- HSwMS Mode (29)
- HSwMS Magne (30)
- HSwMS Munin (31)
- HSwMS Mjölner (32)

Ragnar class

- HSwMS Vidar (4), later (23) stricken 1947, sunk 1961
- HSwMS Ragnar (5), later (22), stricken 1947, broken up 1951
- HSwMS Sigurd (6), later (21), stricken 1947, broken up 1951

Hugin class

- HSwMS Hugin (7), later (24), stricken 1947, broken up 1949
- HSwMS Munin (8), stricken 1940, broken up ~1943

Others

- HSwMS Mode (1), stricken 1928, sunk as target 1936
- HSwMS Magne (2), stricken 1936, target, broken up 1944
- HSwMS Wale (3), stricken 1940, sunk as target 1946

== Frigates ==
- HSwMS Vanadis, launched 1862, broken up 1945

== Corvettes ==
Göteborg class

- HSwMS Göteborg (K21)
- HSwMS Kalmar (K23)

Sailing corvettes

- HSwMS Jarramas
- HSwMS Najaden
- HSwMS Carlskrona
- HSwMS Lagerbielke
- HSwMS Svalan

Steam-corvettes

- HSwMS Freja
- HSwMS Gefle
- HSwMS Orädd
- HSwMS Balder
- HSwMS Saga
- HSwMS Thor
- HSwMS Valkyrian

== Motor torpedo boats ==
- T1
- T1 (2)
- T2
- T3
- T4
- T11
- T12
- T13
- T14
- T15
- T16
- T17
- T18
- T19
- T20
- T21
- T22
- T23
- T24
- T25
- T26
- T27
- T28
- T29
- T30
- T31
- T32
- T33
- T34
- T35
- T36
- T37
- T38
- T39
- T40
- T41, converted to the picket boat HSwMS Viken (V04)
- T42, converted to the picket boat HSwMS Skanör (V01)
- T43, converted to the picket boat HSwMS Smyge (V02)
- T44, converted to the picket boat HSwMS Arild (V03)
- T45
- T46
- T47
- T48, converted to the picket boat HSwMS Slite (V06)
- T49
- T50, converted to the picket boat HSwMS Marstrand (V07)
- T51, converted to the picket boat HSwMS Lysekil (V08)
- T52
- T53
- T54
- T55
- T56
- T201

== Missile boats ==
Norrköping class

- HSwMS Norrköping (R131)
- HSwMS Nynäshamn (R132)
- HSwMS Norrtälje (R133)
- HSwMS Varberg (R134)
- HSwMS Västerås (R135)
- HSwMS Västervik (R136)
- HSwMS Umeå (R137)
- HSwMS Piteå (R138)
- HSwMS Luleå (R139)
- HSwMS Halmstad (R140)
- HSwMS Strömstad (R141)
- HSwMS Ystad (R142)

Ystad class

- HSwMS Norrköping (R131)
- HSwMS Nynäshamn (R132)
- HSwMS Piteå (R138)
- HSwMS Luleå (R139)
- HSwMS Halmstad (R140)
- HSwMS Ystad (R142)

== Monitors ==
- John Ericsson class
  - HSwMS John Ericsson (1865) - sold in 1919
  - HSwMS Thordön (1865) - sold in 1922
  - HSwMS Tirfing (1866) - Sold for scrap in 1922
  - HSwMS Loke (1869) - scrapped in 1908
- HSwMS Garmer (1867) - sold for scrap in 1893
- HSwMS Sköld (1868) - sunk as a target in 1907
- HSwMS Fenris (1872) - retired in 1903
- Hildur class
  - HSwMS Hildur (1872) - sold in 1919
  - HSwMS Gerda (1872) - retired in 1919
  - HSwMS Ulf (1873) - sold in 1919
  - HSwMS Berserk (1874) - sold in 1919
  - HSwMS Björn (1874) - sold in 1919
  - HSwMS Sölve (1875) - sold in 1919
  - HSwMS Folke (1875) - decommissioned in 1919

== Patrol vessels ==
- HSwMS Jägaren (P150), reclassified to picket boat (vedettbåt) in 1988
- HSwMS Hugin (P151)
- HSwMS Munin (P152)
- HSwMS Magne (P153)
- HSwMS Mode (P154)
- HSwMS Vale (P155)
- HSwMS Vidar (P156)
- HSwMS Mjölner (P157)
- HSwMS Mysing (P158)
- HSwMS Kaparen (P159)
- HSwMS Väktaren (P160)
- HSwMS Snapphanen (P161)
- HSwMS Spejaren (P162)
- HSwMS Styrbjörn (P163)
- HSwMS Starkodder (P164)
- HSwMS Tordön (P165)
- HSwMS Tirfing (P166)

Type 60 class

- HSwMS Torskär (61)
- HSwMS Väderskär (62)
- HSwMS Ekeskär (63)
- HSwMS Skifteskär (64)
- HSwMS Gråskär (65)
- HSwMS Örskär (66)
- HSwMS Vitaskär (67)
- HSwMS Altarskär (68)
- HSwMS Äggskär (69)
- HSwMS Hojskär (70)
- HSwMS Getorskär (71)
- HSwMS Flaggskär (72)
- HSwMS Häradsskär (73)
- HSwMS Bredskär (74)
- HSwMS Sprängskär (75)
- HSwMS Hamnskär (76)
- HSwMS Huvudskär (77)

Tapper class

- HSwMS Tapper (81)
- HSwMS Djärv (82)
- HSwMS Dristig (83)
- HSwMS Händig (84)
- HSwMS Trygg (85)
- HSwMS Modig (86)
- HSwMS Hurtig (87)
- HSwMS Rapp (88)
- HSwMS Stolt (89)
- HSwMS Ärlig (90)
- HSwMS Munter (91)
- HSwMS Orädd (92)

== Torpedo boats ==
1. class

- HSwMS Komet
- HSwMS Blixt
- HSwMS Meteor
- HSwMS Stjerna
- HSwMS Orkan
- HSwMS Bris
- HSwMS Vind
- HSwMS Virgo
- HSwMS Mira
- HSwMS Orion
- HSwMS Sirius
- HSwMS Kapella
- HSwMS Plejad
- HSwMS Iris
- HSwMS Thetis
- HSwMS Spica
- HSwMS Astrea
- HSwMS Antares
- HSwMS Arcturus
- HSwMS Altair
- HSwMS Argo
- HSwMS Polaris
- HSwMS Perseus
- HSwMS Regulus
- HSwMS Rigel
- HSwMS Castor
- HSwMS Pollux
- HSwMS Vega
- HSwMS Vesta

2. class

- HSwMS Hugin

Perseus

- HSwMS Perseus

Plejad class

- HSwMS Plejad (T102)
- HSwMS Polaris (T103)
- HSwMS Pollux (T104)
- HSwMS Regulus (T105)
- HSwMS Rigel (T106)
- HSwMS Alderbaran (T107)
- HSwMS Altair (T108)
- HSwMS Antares (T109)
- HSwMS Arcturus (T110)
- HSwMS Argo (T111)
- HSwMS Astrea (T112)

Spica class

- HSwMS Spica (T121)
- HSwMS Sirius (T122)
- HSwMS Capella (T123)
- HSwMS Castor (T124)
- HSwMS Vega (T125)
- HSwMS Virgo (T126)

Norrköping class

- HSwMS Norrköping (T131)
- HSwMS Nynäshamn (T132)
- HSwMS Norrtälje (T133)
- HSwMS Varberg (T134)
- HSwMS Västerås (T135)
- HSwMS Västervik (T136)
- HSwMS Umeå (T137)
- HSwMS Piteå (T138)
- HSwMS Luleå (T139)
- HSwMS Halmstad (T140)
- HSwMS Strömstad (T141)
- HSwMS Ystad (T142)

== Submarines ==
- URF

Gotland class

- HSwMS Gotland (Gtd)
- HSwMS Halland (Hnd)
- HSwMS Uppland (Upd)

Västergötland class

- HSwMS Östergötland (Ögd)
- HSwMS Västergötland (Vgd)
- HSwMS Hälsingland (Hgd)

Näcken class

- HSwMS Najad (Nad)
- HSwMS Neptun (Nep)
- HSwMS Näcken (Näk)

Sjöormen class

- HSwMS Sjöormen (Sor)
- HSwMS Sjölejonet (Sle)
- HSwMS Sjöhunden (Shu)
- HSwMS Sjöbjörnen (Sbj)
- HSwMS Sjöhästen (Shä)

Draken class

- HSwMS Delfinen
- HSwMS Draken
- HSwMS Gripen
- HSwMS Nordkaparen
- HSwMS Springaren
- HSwMS Vargen

Hajen-class

- HSwMS Bävern
- HSwMS Hajen
- HSwMS Illern
- HSwMS Sälen
- HSwMS Uttern
- HSwMS Valen

Kust class

- HSwMS U1
- HSwMS U2
- HSwMS U3
- HSwMS U4, rebuilt as the attack submarine HSwMS Forellen (U4)
- HSwMS U5, rebuilt as the attack submarine HSwMS Aborren (U5)
- HSwMS U6, rebuilt as the attack submarine HSwMS Siken (U6)
- HSwMS U7, rebuilt as the attack submarine HSwMS Gäddan (U7)
- HSwMS U8, rebuilt as the attack submarine HSwMS Laxen (U8)
- HSwMS U9, rebuilt as the attack submarine HSwMS Makrillen (U9)

Neptun class (1942–1966)

- HSwMS Neptun, stricken 1966
- HSwMS Najad, stricken 1966
- HSwMS Näcken, stricken 1966

Sjölejonet class (1938–1964)

- HSwMS Sjölejonet, stricken 1959
- HSwMS Sjöbjörnen, stricken 1964
- HSwMS Sjöhunden, stricken 1960
- HSwMS Svärdfisken, stricken 1959
- HSwMS Tumlaren, stricken 1964
- HSwMS Dykaren, stricken 1959
- HSwMS Sjöhästen, stricken 1963
- HSwMS Sjöormen, stricken 1964
- HSwMS Sjöborren, stricken 1959

Delfinen class (1936–1953)

- HSwMS Delfinen, stricken 1953, sold 1957, broken up
- HSwMS Nordkaparen, stricken 1953, sold 1958, broken up
- HSwMS Springaren, stricken 1953, sold 1956, broken up

Draken class (1929–1948)

- HSwMS Draken, stricken 1948
- HSwMS Gripen, stricken 1947
- HSwMS Ulven, mined 1943

Valen class (1925–1944)

- HSwMS Valen, stricken 1944

Bävern class (1921–1944)

- HSwMS Bävern, stricken 1944, broken up 1956
- HSwMS Illern, sunk 1943, salvaged, broken up 1944
- HSwMS Uttern, stricken 1944, broken up

Hajen-class (1917–1943)

- HSwMS Hajen, stricken 1943, broken up 1944
- HSwMS Sälen, stricken 1942, broken up 1946
- HSwMS Valrossen, stricken 1943, broken up 1944

Abborren class (1916–1937)

- HSwMS Abborren, stricken 1937
- HSwMS Braxen, stricken 1937

Svärdfisken class (1914–1936)

- HSwMS Svärdfisken (S), stricken 1936, broken up 1946
- HSwMS Tumlaren (T), stricken 1936, broken up 1946

Laxen class (1914–1935)

- HSwMS Laxen, stricken 1935
- HSwMS Gäddan, stricken 1931

others

- HSwMS Hajen, stricken 1922
- HSwMS Hvalen, stricken 1919, sunk as target
- HSwMS Delfinen, stricken 1930
- HSwMS Spiggen

== Minelayers ==
- HSwMS Älvsnabben (M01)
- HSwMS Älvsborg (M02)
- HSwMS Visborg (M03), later (A265)
- HSwMS Carlskrona (M04), later (P04)
- HSwMS Kalvsund (11), previously (MUL 11)
- HSwMS Arkösund (12), previously (MUL 12)
- HSwMS Kalmarsund (13), previously (MUL 13)
- HSwMS Alnösund (14), previously (MUL 14)
- HSwMS Grundsund (15), previously (MUL 15)
- HSwMS Fårösund (16), previously (MUL 16)
- HSwMS Skramsösund (17), previously (MUL 17)
- HSwMS Öresund (18), previously (MUL 18)
- HSwMS Barösund (19), previously (MUL 19)
- HSwMS Furusund (20), previously (MUL 20), now (A320)

== Minehunters ==
Landsort class

- HSwMS Landsort (M71)
- HSwMS Arholma (M72)
- HSwMS Koster (M73)
- HSwMS Kullen (M74)
- HSwMS Vinga (M75)
- HSwMS Ven (M76)
- HSwMS Ulvön (M77)

Styrsö class

- HSwMS Styrsö (M11)
- HSwMS Spårö (M12)
- HSwMS Skaftö (M13)
- HSwMS Sturkö (M14)

Spårö class - remodeled from the Styrsö class.

- HSwMS Spårö (M12)
- HSwMS Sturkö (M14)

Koster class - remodeled from the Landsort class.

- HSwMS Koster (M73)
- HSwMS Kullen (M74)
- HSwMS Vinga (M75)
- HSwMS Ven (M76)
- HSwMS Ulvön (M77)

== Minesweepers ==
Sökaren class

- HSwMS Sökaren (47)
- HSwMS Sveparen (48)
- HSwMS Sprängaren (49)

Styrbjörn class

- HSwMS Starkodder (51)
- HSwMS Styrbjörn (52)

Arholma class

- HSwMS Arholma (53)
- HSwMS Landsort (54)
- HSwMS Bremön (55)
- HSwMS Holmön (56)
- HSwMS Sandön (57)
- HSwMS Ulvön (58)
- HSwMS Bredskär (59)
- HSwMS Grönskär (60)
- HSwMS Ramskär (61)
- HSwMS Örskär (62)
- HSwMS Koster (63)
- HSwMS Kulle (64)
- HSwMS Vinga (65)
- HSwMS Ven (66)

=== Minesweepers, Trawler type ===
- HSwMS Gåssten (M31)
- HSwMS Norrsten (M32)
- HSwMS Viksten (M33)
- HSwMS Orust (M41)
- HSwMS Tjörn (M42)
- HSwMS Hisingen (M43)
- HSwMS Blackan (M44)
- HSwMS Dämman (M45)
- HSwMS Galten (M46)
- HSwMS Gillöga (M47)
- HSwMS Rödlöga (M48)
- HSwMS vartlöga (M49)

=== Coastal minesweepers ===
Hanö class

- HSwMS Hanö (M51)
- HSwMS Tärnö (M52), reclassified to picket boat (vedettbåt) in 1979
- HSwMS Tjurkö (M53), reclassified to picket boat (vedettbåt) in 1979
- HSwMS Sturkö (M54), reclassified to picket boat (vedettbåt) in 1979
- HSwMS Ornö (M55), reclassified to picket boat (vedettbåt) in 1979
- HSwMS Utö (M56)

Arkö class

- HSwMS Arkö (M57)
- HSwMS Spårö (M58)
- HSwMS Karlsö (M59)
- HSwMS Iggö (M60)
- HSwMS Styrsö (M61)
- HSwMS Skaftö (M62)
- HSwMS Aspö (M63)
- HSwMS Hasslö (M64)
- HSwMS Vinö (M65)
- HSwMS Vållö (M66)
- HSwMS Nämdö (M67)
- HSwMS Blidö (M68)

=== M series ===
- HSwMS M1
- HSwMS M2

=== M3 – M14 (39-båtarna) ===
- HSwMS M3
- HSwMS M4
- HSwMS M5
- HSwMS M6
- HSwMS M7
- HSwMS M8
- HSwMS M9
- HSwMS M10
- HSwMS M11
- HSwMS M12
- HSwMS M13
- HSwMS M14

=== M15 – M26 (40-båtarna) ===
- HSwMS M15
- HSwMS M16
- HSwMS M17
- HSwMS M18
- HSwMS M19
- HSwMS M20
- HSwMS M21
- HSwMS M22
- HSwMS M23
- HSwMS M24
- HSwMS M25
- HSwMS M26

== Picket boats ==
- HSwMS Jägaren
- HSwMS Kaparen
- HSwMS Snapphanen
- HSwMS Väktaren
- HSwMS Skanör (V01), previously the motor torpedo boat T42
- HSwMS Smyge (V02), previously the motor torpedo boat T43
- HSwMS Arild (V03), previously the motor torpedo boat T44
- HSwMS Viken (V04), previously the motor torpedo boat T41
- HSwMS Öregrund (V05), previously the motor torpedo boat T47
- HSwMS Slite (V06), previously the motor torpedo boat T48
- HSwMS Marstrand (V07), previously the motor torpedo boat T50
- HSwMS Lysekil (V08), previously the motor torpedo boat T11
- HSwMS Jägaren (V150)

=== Type III ===
- HSwMS Dalarö (V09)
- HSwMS Sandhamn (V10)
- HSwMS Östhammar (V11)

=== Reclassified torpedo boats ===
- HSwMS Altair
- HSwMS Antares
- HSwMS Arcturus
- HSwMS Argo
- HSwMS Astrea
- HSwMS Castor
- HSwMS Iris
- HSwMS Perseus
- HSwMS Polaris
- HSwMS Pollux
- HSwMS Regulus
- HSwMS Rigel
- HSwMS Spica
- HSwMS Thetis
- HSwMS Vega
- HSwMS Vesta

=== Reclassified minesweepers ===
- HSwMS Tärnö (V52)
- HSwMS Tjurkö (V53)
- HSwMS Sturkö (V54)
- HSwMS Ornö (V55)

=== Auxiliary picket boats ===
- Hjvb 232 (Isbjörn)
- Hjvb 282 (Libanon)
- Hjvb 356 (Barry)
- Hjvb 356 (Condor)
- Hjvb 356 (Ocean)

== Sonar buoy ships ==
Ejdern class

- HSwMS Ejdern (B01)
- HSwMS Krickan (B02)
- HSwMS Svärtan (B03)
- HSwMS Viggen (B04)

== Training ships ==
- HSwMS Gladan
- HSwMS af Chapman
- HSwMS Najaden
- HSwMS Jarramas
- HSwMS Viksten (M33)
- HSwMS M20
- HSwMS M21
- HSwMS M22
- HSwMS M24
- HSwMS M25
- HSwMS Gladan (S01)
- HSwMS Falken (S02)

Altair class

- HSwMS Altair (A501)
- HSwMS Antares (A502)
- HSwMS Arcturus (A503)
- HSwMS Argo (A504)
- HSwMS Astrea (A505)

== Transport ships ==
- HSwMS Tjelvar
- HSwMS Ring
- HSwMS Grim
- HSwMS Heimdal
- HSwMS Bore

== Other ==
- HSwMS Smyge
- Kronan
- Vasa

== See also ==
- List of active Swedish Navy ships

== Bibliography ==
- Gardiner, Robert (1980). Conway's All the World's Fighting Ships 1922-1946. London: Conway Maritime Press. pp. 368–377. ISBN 0851771467.
- Gardiner, Robert (1986). Conway's All the World's Fighting Ships 1906-1921. London: Conway Maritime Press. pp. 355–363. ISBN 0851772455.
- Gardiner, Robert (1979). Conway's All the World's Fighting Ships 1860-1905. London: Conway Maritime Press. pp. 360–363. ISBN 0851771335.
