= List of torpedo boats of the Swedish Navy =

Ships of the
Swedish Navy
Capital ships
Coastal defence ships
Corvettes
Cruisers
Destroyers
Frigates
Mine warfare vessels
Monitors
Patrol vessels
Gunboats
Sloops of war
Submarines
Torpedo boats

This is a list of Swedish torpedo boats.

== Torpedo boats ==
=== 1st class torpedo boats ===
- HSwMS Komet (1896–1916), V20 (1916–1926))
- HSwMS Blixt (1898–1921), V27 (1921–1947)
- HSwMS Meteor (1899–1921), V28 (1921–1947)
- HSwMS Stjerna (1899–1921), V29 (1921–1937)
- HSwMS Orkan (1900–1921), V30 (1921–1947)
- HSwMS Bris (1900–1921), V31 (1921–1937)
- HSwMS Vind (1900–1921), V32 (1921–1937)
- HSwMS Virgo (1902–1921), V33 (1921–1941)
- HSwMS Mira (1902)-1921), V34 (1921–1943)
- HSwMS Orion (1903–1921), V35 (1921–1947)
- HSwMS Sirius (1903–1921), V36 (1921–1942)
- HSwMS Kapella (1904–1921), V37 (1921–1937)
- HSwMS Plejad (1905–1926), V38 (1926–1930)
- HSwMS Iris (1909–1928), V39 (1928–1947)
- HSwMS Thetis (1909–1928), V40 (1928–1947)
- HSwMS Spica (1908–1928), V41 (1928–1947)
- HSwMS Astrea (1909–1928), V42 (1928–1947)
- HSwMS Antares (1909–1928), V43 (1928–1947)
- HSwMS Arcturus (1909–1928), V44 (1928–1940)
- HSwMS Altair (1909–1928), V45 (1928–1947)
- HSwMS Argo (1909–1928), V46 (1928–1940)
- HSwMS Polaris (1910–1928), V47 (1928–1947)
- HSwMS Perseus (1910–1928), V48 (1928–1947)
- HSwMS Regulus (1910–1928), V49 (1928–1944)
- HSwMS Rigel (1910–1928), V50 (1928–1944)
- HSwMS Castor (1909–1928), V51 (1928–1940)
- HSwMS Pollux (1909–1928), V52 (1928–1940)
- HSwMS Vega (1911–1928), V53 (1928–1941)
- HSwMS Vesta (1911–1928), V54 (1928–1941)

=== 2nd class torpedo boats ===
- HSwMS Hugin (1884)

=== Perseus 1951-1967 ===
- HSwMS Perseus

=== Plejad class 1954-1973 ===
- HSwMS Plejad (T102)
- HSwMS Polaris (T103)
- HSwMS Pollux (T104)
- HSwMS Regulus (T105)
- HSwMS Rigel (T106)
- HSwMS Aldebaran (T107)
- HSwMS Altair (T108)
- HSwMS Antares (T109)
- HSwMS Arcturus (T110)
- HSwMS Argo (T111)
- HSwMS Astrea (T112)

=== Spica-class torpedo boat 1966-1987 ===
- HSwMS Spica (T121)
- HSwMS Sirius (T122)
- HSwMS Capella (T123)
- HSwMS Castor (T124)
- HSwMS Vega (T125)
- HSwMS Virgo (T126)

== Missile boats ==
=== Norrköping class (Spica II) 1973-1983 ===
- HSwMS Norrköping (T131)
- HSwMS Nynäshamn (T132)
- HSwMS Norrtälje (T133)
- HSwMS Varberg (T134)
- HSwMS Västerås (T135)
- HSwMS Västervik (T136)
- HSwMS Umeå (T137)
- HSwMS Piteå (T138)
- HSwMS Luleå (T139)
- HSwMS Halmstad (T140)
- HSwMS Strömstad (T141)
- HSwMS Ystad (T142)

=== Ystad class (Spica II) 1983-2005 ===
- HSwMS Norrköping (R131)
- HSwMS Ystad (R131)
