= List of mine warfare vessels of the Swedish Navy =

Ships of the
Swedish Navy
Capital ships
Coastal defence ships
Corvettes
Cruisers
Destroyers
Frigates
Mine warfare vessels
Monitors
Patrol vessels
Gunboats
Sloops of war
Submarines
Torpedo boats

This is a list of Swedish mine warfare vessels.

== Minelayers ==
=== Active ===
- HSwMS Visborg
- HSwMS Carlskrona

=== Decommissioned ===
- HSwMS Älvsnabben (M01)
- HSwMS Älvsborg (M02)

== Minesweepers ==
=== Active ===
Landsort class (1982-1992)

- HSwMS Landsort (M71)
- HSwMS Arholma (M72)
- HSwMS Koster (M73)
- HSwMS Kullen (M74)
- HSwMS Vinga (M75)
- HSwMS Ven (M76)
- HSwMS Ulvön (M77)

Styrsö class (1996-1997)

- HSwMS Styrsö (M11)
- HSwMS Spårö (M12)
- HSwMS Skaftö (M13)
- HSwMS Sturkö (M14)

Spårö class (2004) - upgraded from Styrsö class.

- HSwMS Spårö (M12)
- HSwMS Sturkö (M14)

Koster class (2008-2009) - upgraded from Landsort class.

- HSwMS Koster (M73)
- HSwMS Kullen (M74)
- HSwMS Vinga (M75)
- HSwMS Ven (M76)
- HSwMS Ulvön (M77)

=== Decommissioned ===
Sökaren class

- HSwMS Sökaren (47)
- HSwMS Sveparen (48)
- HSwMS Sprängaren (49)

Styrbjörn class

- HSwMS Starkodder (51)
- HSwMS Styrbjörn (52)

Arholma class

- HSwMS Arholma (53)
- HSwMS Landsort (54)
- HSwMS Bremön (55)
- HSwMS Holmön (56)
- HSwMS Sandön (57)
- HSwMS Ulvön (58)
- HSwMS Bredskär (59)
- HSwMS Grönskär (60)
- HSwMS Ramskär (61)
- HSwMS Örskär (62)
- HSwMS Koster (63)
- HSwMS Kullen (64)
- HSwMS Vinga (65)
- HSwMS Ven (66)

Fiskeminsvepare class

- HSwMS Gåssten (M31)
- HSwMS Norsten (M32)
- HSwMS Viksten (M33)
- HSwMS Orust (M41)
- HSwMS Tjörn (M42)
- HSwMS Hisingen (M43)
- HSwMS Blackan (M44)
- HSwMS Dämman (M45)
- HSwMS Galten (M46)
- HSwMS Gillöga (M47)
- HSwMS Rödlöga (M48)
- HSwMS Svartlöga (M49)

==== Coastal minesweepers ====
Hanöklass class

- HSwMS Hanö (M51)
- HSwMS Tärnö (M52) - reclassified as patrol boat 1979
- HSwMS Tjurkö (M53) - reclassified as patrol boat 1979
- HSwMS Sturkö (M54) - reclassified as patrol boat 1979
- HSwMS Ornö (M55) - reclassified as patrol boat 1979
- HSwMS Utö (M56)

Arkö class

- HSwMS Arkö (M57)
- HSwMS Spårö (M58)
- HSwMS Karlsö (M59)
- HSwMS Iggö (M60)
- HSwMS Styrsö (M61)
- HSwMS Skaftö (M62)
- HSwMS Aspö (M63)
- HSwMS Hasslö (M64)
- HSwMS Vinö (M65)
- HSwMS Vållö (M66)
- HSwMS Nämdö (M67)
- HSwMS Blidö (M68)

==== M-series ====
- HSwMS M1 (1937)
- HSwMS M2 (1937)
- HSwMS M3 (1940)
- HSwMS M4 (1940)
- HSwMS M5 (1940)
- HSwMS M6 (1940)
- HSwMS M7 (1940)
- HSwMS M8 (1941)
- HSwMS M9 (1940)
- HSwMS M10 (1940)
- HSwMS M11 (1940)
- HSwMS M12 (1941)
- HSwMS M13 (1940)
- HSwMS M14 (1941)
- HSwMS M15 (1941)
- HSwMS M16 (1941)
- HSwMS M17 (1941)
- HSwMS M18 (1941)
- HSwMS M19 (1941)
- HSwMS M20 (1941)
- HSwMS M21 (1941)
- HSwMS M22 (1941)
- HSwMS M23 (1941)
- HSwMS M24 (1941)
- HSwMS M25 (1941)
- HSwMS M26 (1941)
