= HSwMS Mira =

Swedish torpedo boat

- Mira's sister ship Orion in 1903

History

Sweden
- Name: Mira (1902-1921); Vedettbåten V34 (1921-1943)
- Builder: Karlskrona Navy Yard
- Launched: 26 April 1902
- Acquired: 26 November 1902
- Decommissioned: 17 December 1943
- Fate: Scrapped, 1949

General characteristics
- Type: Torpedo boat
- Displacement: 92 tonnes (91 long tons)
- Length: 39 metres (127 ft 11 in)
- Beam: 4.8 metres (15 ft 9 in)
- Draft: 2.1 metres (6 ft 11 in)
- Speed: 23 knots (43 km/h; 26 mph)
- Complement: 18
- Armament: 2 × 38.1 cm (15.0 in) torpedo tubes; 2 × 4.7 cm (1.9 in) guns

HSwMS Mira was a Komet-class torpedo boat of the Swedish Navy. Launched in 1902 as part of a modernization effort, she operated off the Swedish coast. The ship was redesignated in 1921, renamed Vedettbåten V34, and fitted with minesweeping equipment. She was transferred to the Swedish Customs Service in 1935, returned to the Navy during World War II, and decommissioned in 1943.

== Development and design ==
In the late 19th century, the Swedish Navy focused on defending the country's coast and modernized after the Imperial Russian Navy's Baltic Fleet was similarly modernized. Launched in 1896 and built by Schichau-Werke in Germany, HSwMS Komet was the first torpedo boat of the Swedish Navy faster than 20 knots (37 km/h; 23 mph). Her design was used as the basis for the next generation of Swedish torpedo boats, with the addition of a second boiler and funnel. The resulting eleven Komet-class torpedo boats featured a length of 39 metres (127 ft 11 in), beam of 4.8 metres (15 ft 9 in), draft of 2.1 metres (6 ft 11 in), fully loaded displacement of 92 tonnes (91 long tons), and a compliment of 18. They were propelled by two Yarrow water tube boilers that produced steam for a three cylinder triple expansion steam engine that output 1,350 indicated horsepower (1,010 kW) and turned one propeller to output a top speed of 23 knots (43 km/h; 26 mph). The ships had a range of 740 nautical miles (1,370 km; 850 mi) at a cruising speed of 15 knots (28 km/h; 17 mph). Armament consisted of two 38.1 cm (15.0 in) M/93 torpedo tubes and two 4.7 cm (1.9 in) M/95 guns. Unlike her sister ships which featured a bow torpedo tube fixed in the hull, both on Mira were trainable and mounted on the deck.

== Service history ==
The Swedish Navy designated the Komet-class as 1st rate torpedo boats as they displaced more than 60 tonnes (59 long tons). As the largest type of torpedo boat, they were intended to operate off the Swedish coast and in the Swedish Archipelagos alongside 1st rate gunboats. Mira was built by the Karlskrona Navy Yard, launched on 26 April 1902, and delivered to the Swedish Navy in 26 November 1902. In 1910, she was rearmed with two 3.7 cm (1.5 in) M/98B guns. In 1921, the entire class was redesignated as Vedettbåt (type of patrol boat), and renamed. Mira was renamed Vedettbåten V34 and had one torpedo tube removed and fitted with minesweeper equipment. She was one of the most worn members of the class and transferred to the Swedish Customs Service in 1935. At the start of World War II, she was returned to the Navy only to be decommissioned on 17 December 1943 and sold at Norrköping for scrap in 1949.
