= HSwMS Meteor =

Swedish torpedo boat

- Sister ship Vedettbåten V27, formally Blixt, in 1944

History

Sweden
- Name: Meteor (1899-1921); Vedettbåten V28 (1921-1947)
- Builder: Karlskrona Navy Yard
- Launched: 28 September 1898
- Acquired: December 1899
- Decommissioned: 13 July 1947

General characteristics
- Type: Torpedo boat
- Displacement: 92 tonnes (91 long tons)
- Length: 39 metres (127 ft 11 in)
- Beam: 4.8 metres (15 ft 9 in)
- Draft: 2.1 metres (6 ft 11 in)
- Speed: 23 knots (43 km/h; 26 mph)
- Complement: 18
- Armament: 2 × 38.1 cm (15.0 in) torpedo tubes; 2 × 4.7 cm (1.9 in) guns

HSwMS Meteor was a Komet-class torpedo boat of the Swedish Navy. Launched in 1898 as part of a modernization effort, she operated off the Swedish coast. The ship was redesignated in 1921 and renamed Vedettbåten V28. After uneventful service in World War II, she was decommissioned in 1947.

== Development and design ==
In the late 19th century, the Swedish Navy focused on defending the country's coast and modernized after the Imperial Russian Navy's Baltic Fleet was simarily modernized. Launched in 1896 and built by Schichau-Werke in Germany, HSwMS Komet was the first torpedo boat of the Swedish Navy faster than 20 knots (37 km/h; 23 mph). Her design was used as the basis for the next generation of Swedish torpedo boats, with the addition of a second boiler and funnel. The resulting eleven Komet-class torpedo boats featured a length of 39 metres (127 ft 11 in), beam of 4.8 metres (15 ft 9 in), draft of 2.1 metres (6 ft 11 in), and fully loaded displacement of 92 tonnes (91 long tons). They were propelled by two Yarrow water tube boilers that produced steam for a three cylinder triple expansion steam engine that output 1,350 indicated horsepower (1,010 kW) and turned one propeller to output a top speed of 23 knots (43 km/h; 26 mph). The ships had a range of 740 nautical miles (1,370 km; 850 mi) at a cruising speed of 15 knots (28 km/h; 17 mph). Armament consisted of two 38.1 cm (15.0 in) M/93 torpedo tubes and two 4.7 cm (1.9 in) M/95 guns. The ships had a compliment of 18.

== Service history ==
The Swedish Navy designated the Komet-class as 1st rate torpedo boats as they displaced more than 60 tonnes (59 long tons). As the largest type of torpedo boat, they were intended to operate off the Swedish coast and in the Swedish Archipelagos alongside 1st rate gunboats. Meteor was built by the Karlskrona Navy Yard, launched on 28 September 1898, and delivered to the Swedish Navy in December 1899. In 1901, she was rearmed with two 3.7 cm (1.5 in) M/98B guns. In 1921, the entire class was redesignated as Vedettbåt (type of patrol boat), and renamed. Meteor was renamed Vedettbåten V28 and had one torpedo tube removed. For most of World War II, she was assigned to operate out of Malmö, had the torpedo tube reinstalled, and the bow gun was replaced by a 8 mm (0.31 in) machine gun. She was decommissioned on 13 July 1947.
