= HSwMS Stockholm (1856) =

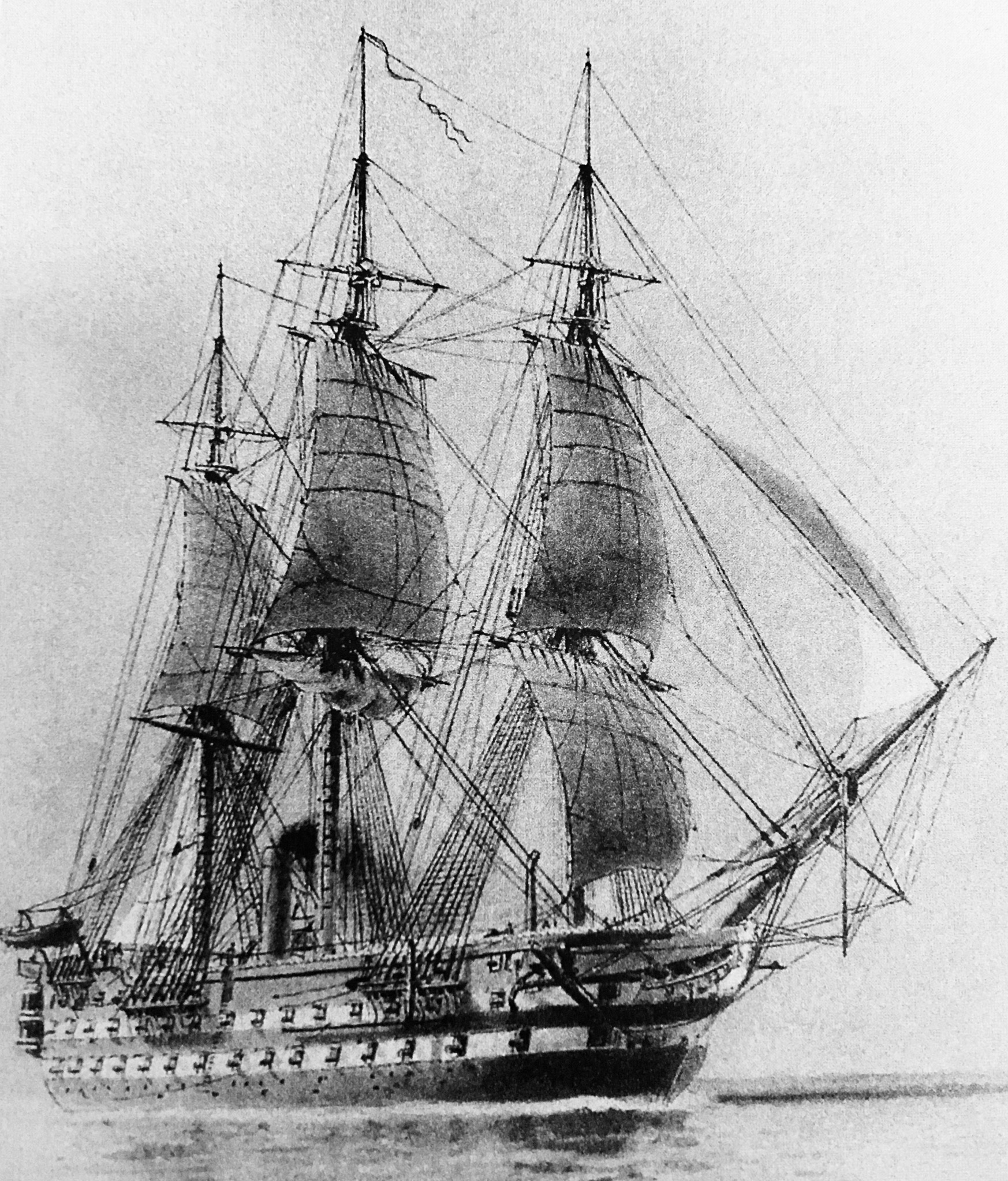
- HSwMS Stockholm

History

Sweden
- Name: Stockholm
- Namesake: Stockholm
- Builder: Karlskrona Naval Shipyard, Blekinge
- Laid down: 8 November 1832
- Launched: 29 November 1856
- Commissioned: 20 May 1857
- Decommissioned: 30 July 1921
- Fate: Scrapped, 1923

General characteristics
- Class & type: 73-gun ship of the line
- Displacement: 2846 tons
- Length: 56.6 ft (17.3 m) o/a
- Beam: 14.8 ft (4.5 m)
- Depth: 6.89 ft (2.10 m)
- Propulsion: 1 × Motala steam engine; 800 ihp (600 kW); 2 × steam boiler
- Speed: 6.5 kn (12.0 km/h)
- Complement: 739
- Armament: (1857); 64 × 30-pounder long gun; 6 × 72-pounder long gun; 1 × 6-pounder long gun; 1 × 18-pounder long gun; 1 × 12-pounder long gun; (1879); 2 × 30-pounder long gun m/39; 2 × 12-pounder long gun m/81; 2 × 12-pounder long gun m/73; 2 × 67 mm landing cannon m/63; 2 × 12 mm machine gun m/1875; 10 × 30-pounder long gun

HSwMS Stockholm was a ship of the line that served in the Swedish Navy and was built by Karlskrona Naval Shipyard. She was named after Stockholm. Commissioned in 1857 and decommissioned in 1921.

== Design and description ==
Stockholm was 56.6 meters long, 14.8 meters wide and had a draft of 6.9 meters. The vessel's displacement amounted to just over 2,846 tonnes.

The machinery in Stockholm consisted of two steam boilers that generated steam for a Motala angle steam engine. The full engine power was about 800 indicated horsepower, which gave a maximum speed of 6.5 knots. When sailing, the propeller could be hoisted up into a shaft.

At the time of launch, the equipment consisted of sixty-four 30-pound cannons, six 72-pound bomb cannons and a six-pound landing cannon. Furthermore, the ship was equipped with an 18-pound and a 12-pound cartridge.

== Construction and career ==
Stockholm was laid down by Karlskrona Naval Shipyard at their shipyard at Blekinge on 8 November 1832 and launched on 29 November 1856. Only after 20 years of work was the ship completed. During this time, however, the technical development was rapid, which is why construction was already provided with a steam engine and propeller during construction. She was commissioned on 20 May 1857.

Like HSwMS Karl XIV Johan, Stockholm did not last long, but was converted in 1872 into a school ship, and was occasionally used as accommodation. The year before, three of the lighter cannons had also been removed. In 1879, Stockholm was reclassified as an artillery school ship and underwent an extensive rearmament, as she was provided with breech-loaded artillery, among other things.

From 1881 she was used as a patrol vessel in Karlskrona and in 1891 the rigging was reduced. The following year, the machinery was also removed, after which she was designated a lodging vessel. She was then stationed at Hallands Väderö and was finally decommissioned on 30 July 1921 and scrapped at Torekov in 1923.

== Gallery ==
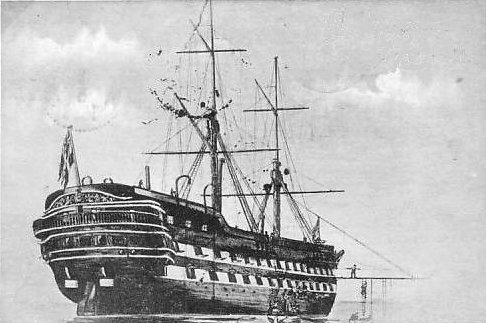
HSwMS Stockholm stern in 1893.

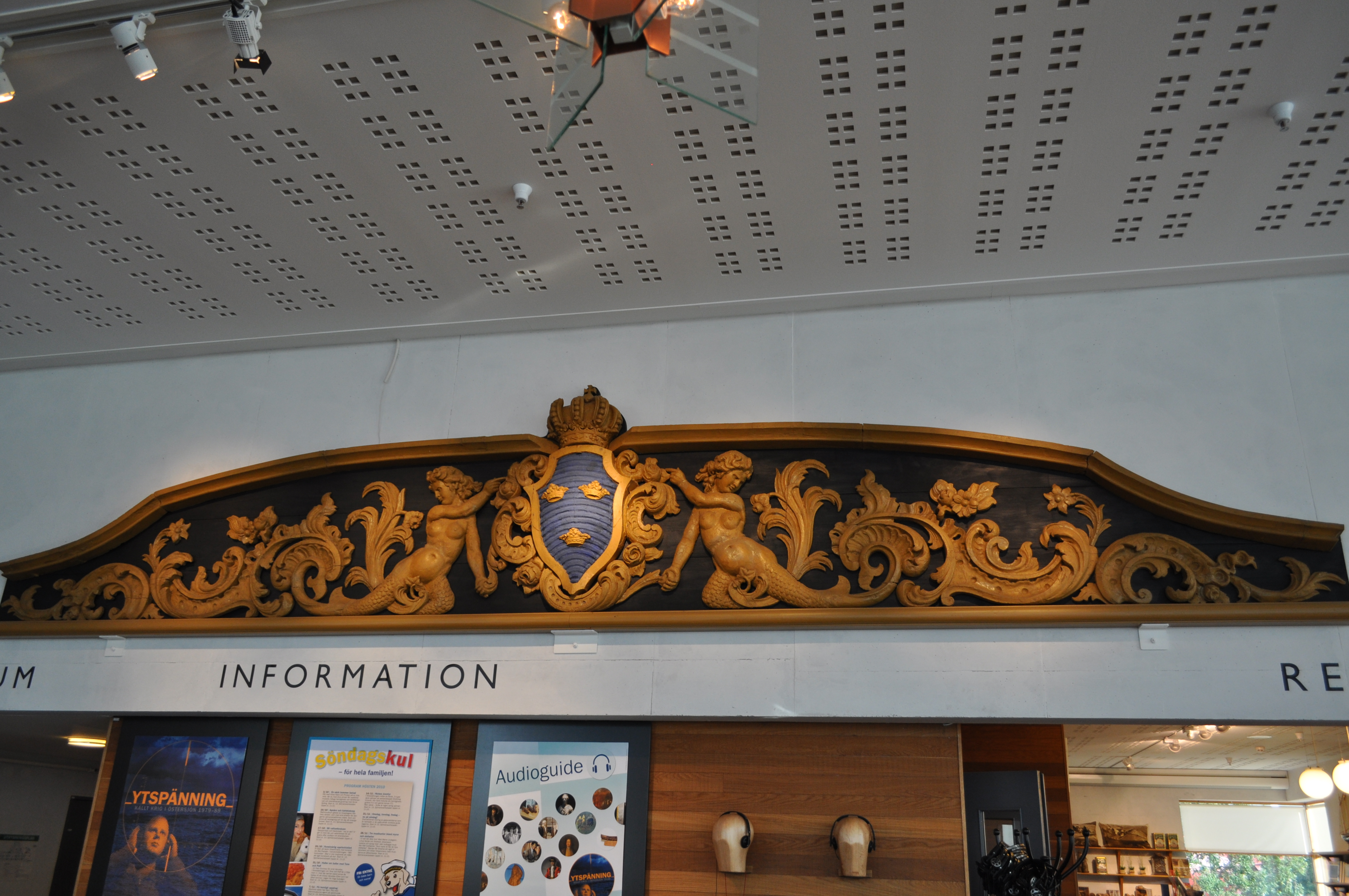
HSwMS Stockholm ornament on display at Karlskrona Marinmuseum, Sweden on 1 September 2010.

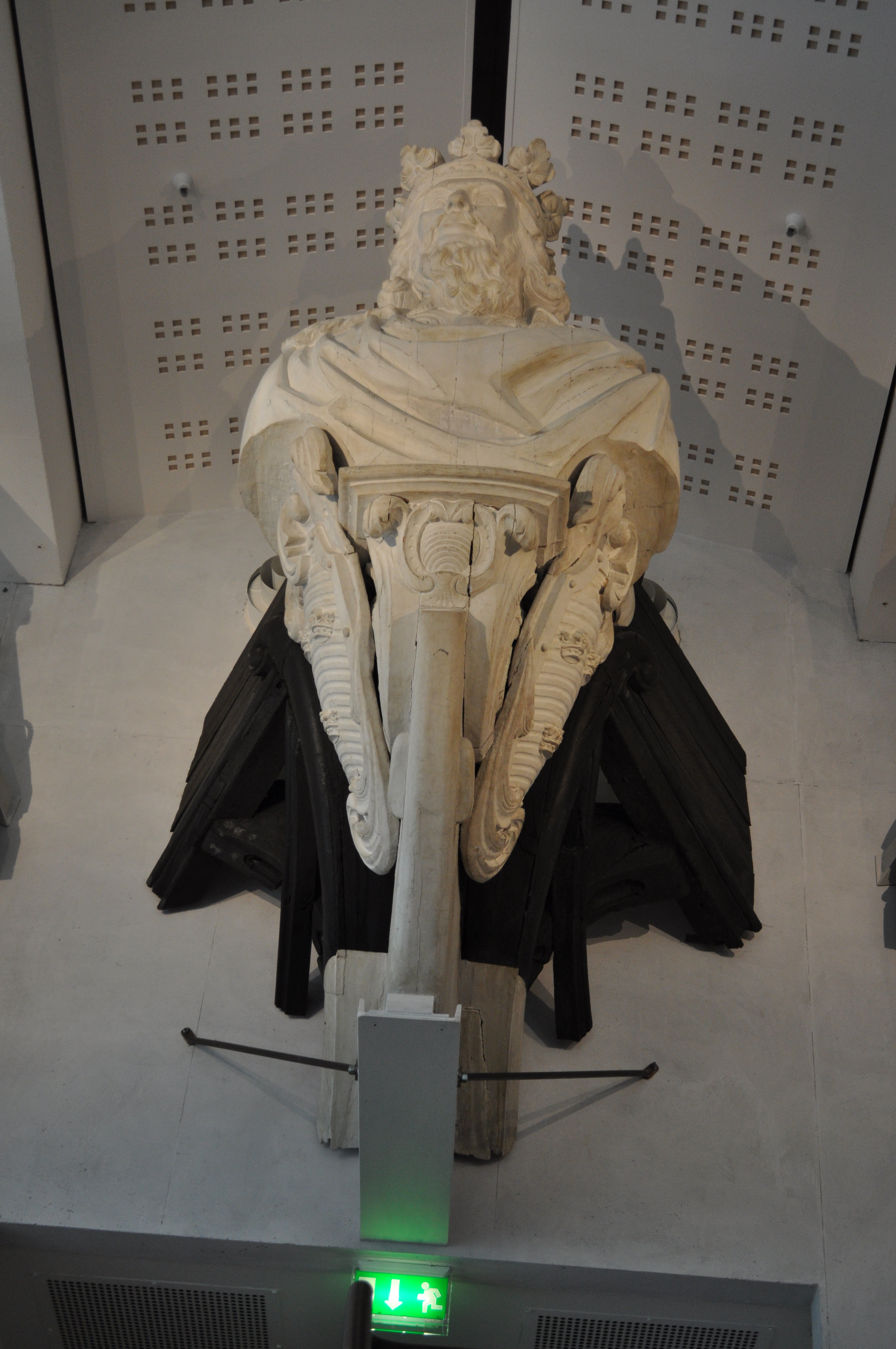
HSwMS Stockholm figurehead on display at Karlskrona Marinmuseum, Sweden on 26 November 2009.

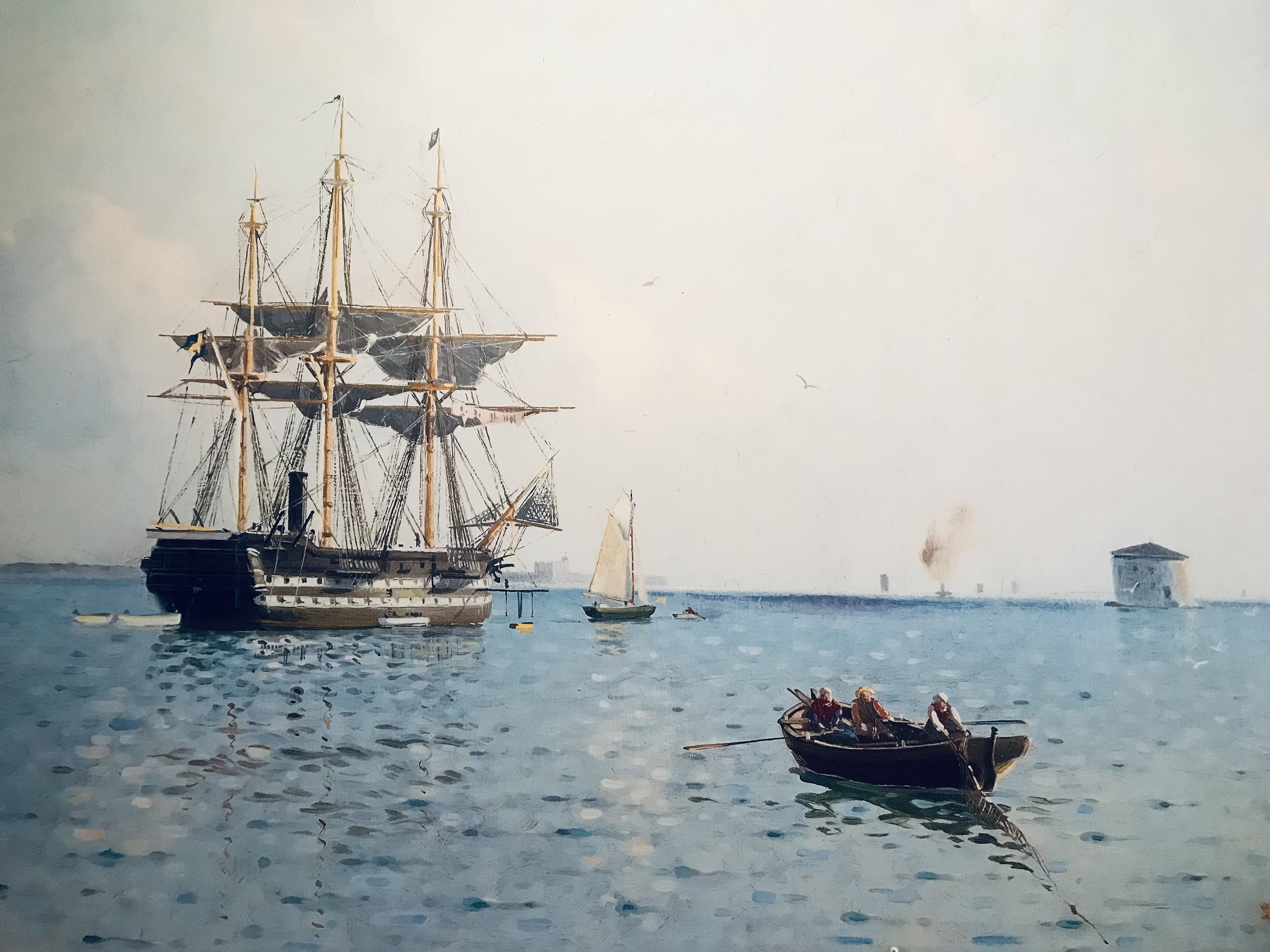
Painting depicting HSwMS Stockholm by Herman af Sillén

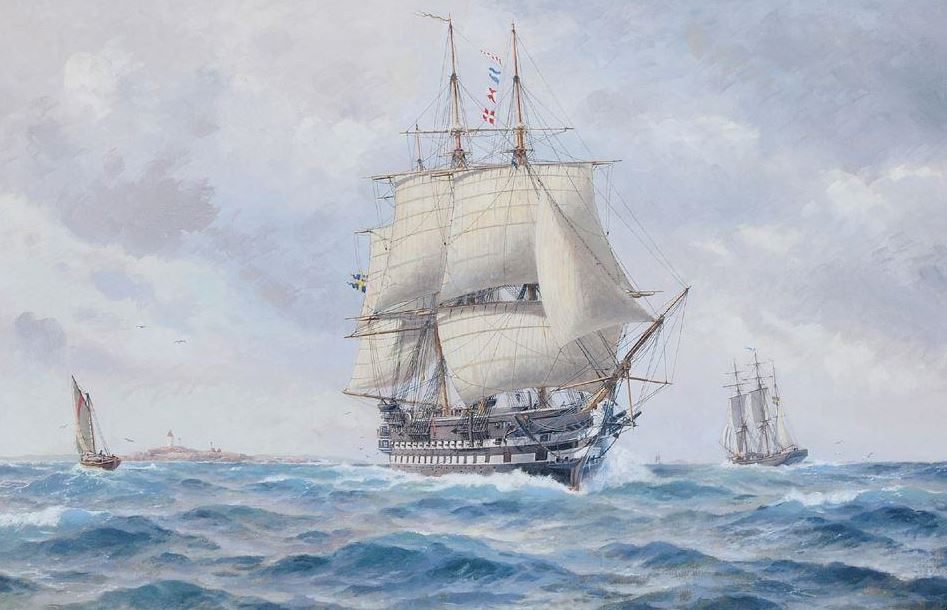
Painting depicting HSwMS Stockholm by Jacob Hägg
