= 1.-class torpedo boat =

Steam ship designation in Scandinavian countries

The 1.-class torpedo boat was a designation in the Scandinavian countries for a type of fast steam ships on more than 80 tons.

== Royal Danish Navy ==
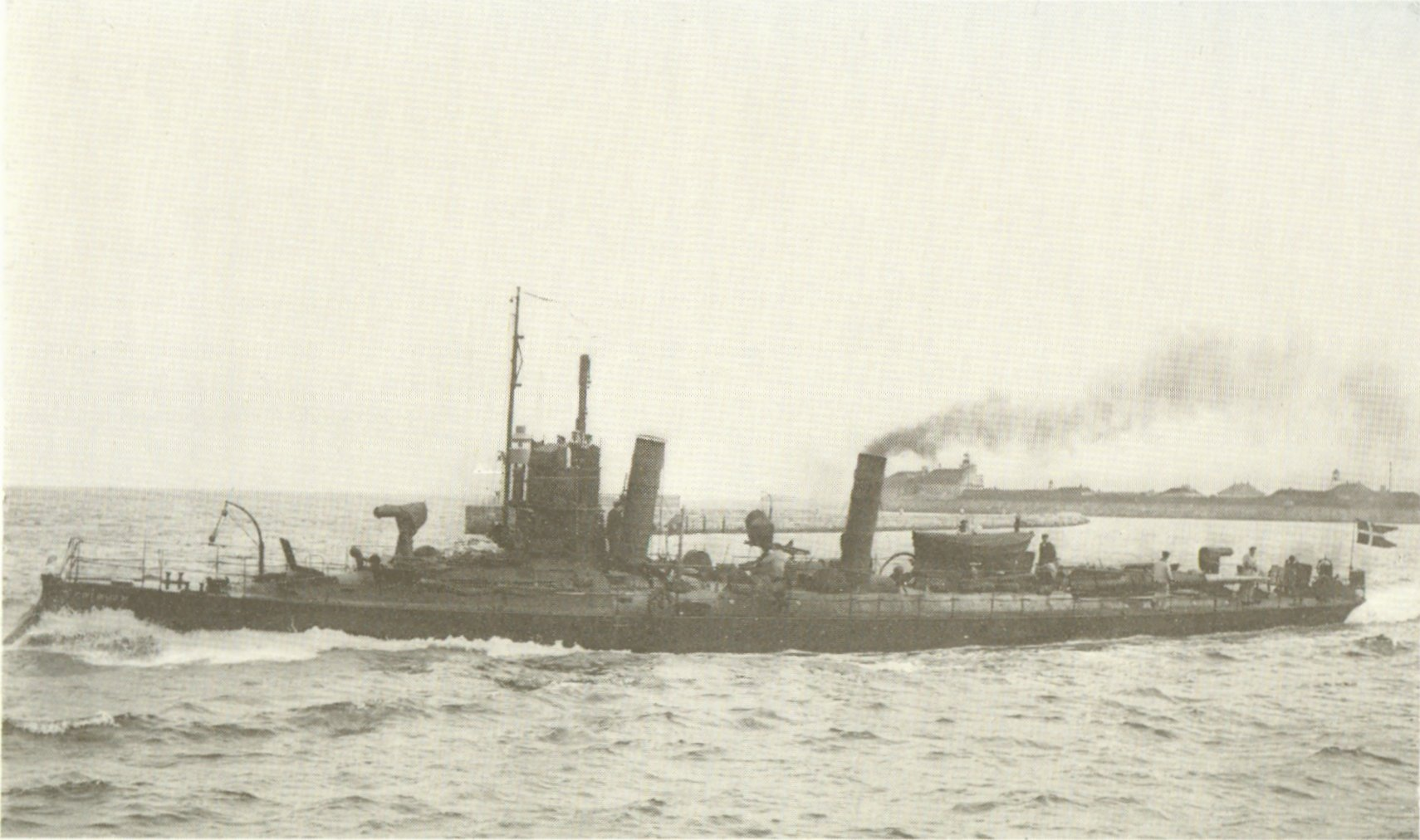
The Danish torpedo boat Søløven

- 1879 Torpedobaad Nr. 4
- 1880 Torpedobaad Nr. 5
- 1881 Torpedobaad Nr. 6
- 1882 Hajen
- 1882 Søulven
- 1882 Sværdfisken
- 1883 Delfinen
- 1884 Hvalrossen
- 1887 Støren
- 1887 Søløven
- 1888 Narhvalen
- 1888 Havhesten
- 1891-1919 Springeren
- 1893 Nordkaperen
- 1893 Makrelen
- 1896 Hajen
- 1896/98 Havørnen
- 1896/98 Søbjørnen
- 1907-1932 Ormen

== Royal Norwegian Navy ==
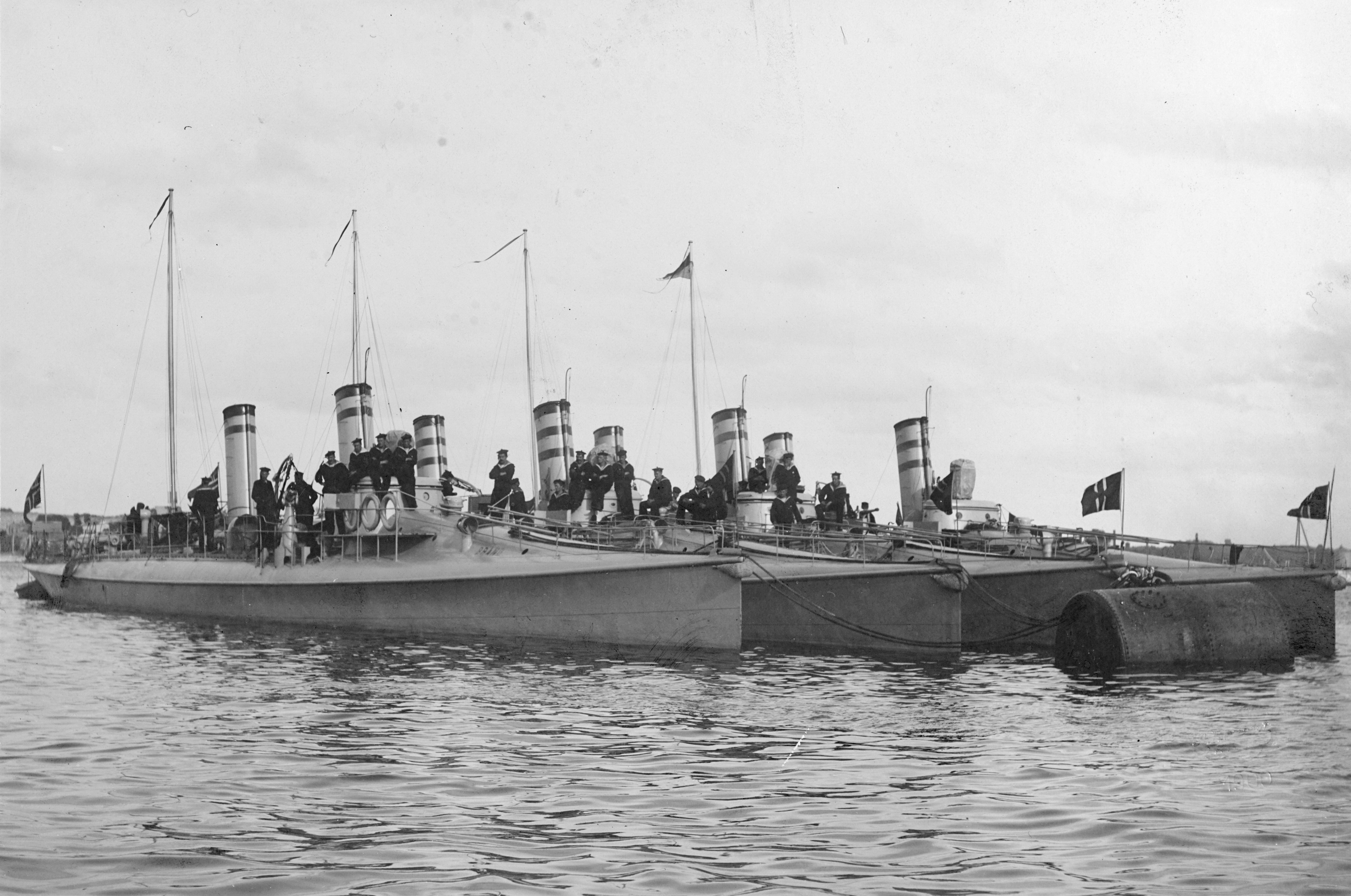
Brand moored in port with three sisters, 1900. Brand is the boat on the left.

The Royal Norwegian Navy had ten torpedo boats built from 1892. 6 of which were still active at the German invasion of Norway in 1940.

- HNoMS Brand (1898)
- HNoMS Hai
- HNoMS Sæl
- HNoMS Storm (1898)

== Royal Swedish Navy ==
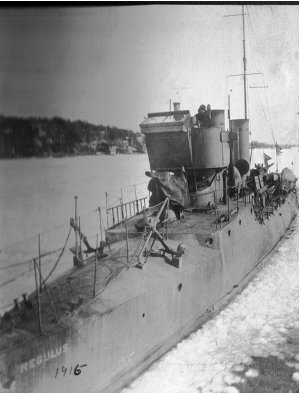
The Swedish torpedo boat Regulus in 1915

- HSwMS Komet (1896-1916), V20 (1916-1926))
- HSwMS Blixt (1898-1921), V27 (1921-1947)
- HSwMS Meteor (1899-1921), V28 (1921-1947)
- HSwMS Stjerna (1899-1921), V29 (1921-1937)
- HSwMS Orkan (1900-1921), V30 (1921-1947)
- HSwMS Bris (1900-1921), V31 (1921-1937)
- HSwMS Vind (1900-1921), V32 (1921-1937)
- HSwMS Virgo (1902-1921), V33 (1921-1941)
- HSwMS Mira (1902)-1921), V34 (1921-1943)
- HSwMS Orion (1903-1921), V35 (1921-1947)
- HSwMS Sirius (1903-1921), V36 (1921-1942)
- HSwMS Kapella (1904-1921), V37 (1921-1937)
- HSwMS Plejad (1905-1926), V38 (1926-1930)
- HSwMS Iris (1909-1928), V39 (1928-1947)
- HSwMS Thetis (1909-1928), V40 (1928-1947)
- HSwMS Spica (1908-1928), V41 (1928-1947)
- HSwMS Astrea (1909-1928), V42 (1928-1947)
- HSwMS Antares (1909-1928), V43 (1928-1947)
- HSwMS Arcturus (1909-1928), V44 (1928-1940)
- HSwMS Altair (1909-1928), V45 (1928-1947)
- HSwMS Argo (1909-1928), V46 (1928-1940)
- HSwMS Polaris (1910-1928), V47 (1928-1947)
- HSwMS Perseus (1910-1928), V48 (1928-1947)
- HSwMS Regulus (1910-1928), V49 (1928-1944)
- HSwMS Rigel (1910-1928), V50 (1928-1944)
- HSwMS Castor (1909-1928), V51 (1928-1940)
- HSwMS Pollux (1909-1928), V52 (1928-1940)
- HSwMS Vega (1911-1928), V53 (1928-1941)
- HSwMS Vesta (1911-1928), V54 (1928-1941)

== See also ==
- HNoMS Lyn, of an earlier class later known as the 2.-class torpedo boats
