= List of submarines of the Swedish Navy =

Ships of the
Swedish Navy
Capital ships
Coastal defence ships
Corvettes
Cruisers
Destroyers
Frigates
Mine warfare vessels
Monitors
Patrol vessels
Gunboats
Sloops of war
Submarines
Torpedo boats

This is a list of Swedish submarines since 1904.

== Active service ==
Gotland class (1992–1997)

- HSwMS Gotland (Gtd)
- HSwMS Halland (Hnd)
- HSwMS Uppland (Upd)

Södermanland class (2003–2004)

- HSwMS Södermanland (Söd) - previous Västergötland class

=== Deep Submergence Rescue Vehicle ===
- URF

== Decommissioned ==
Svärdfisken class

- HSwMS Svärdfisken (1914) (S), stricken 1936, broken up 1946
- HSwMS Tumlaren (1914) (T), stricken 1936, broken up 1946

Laxen class

- HSwMS Laxen (1914), stricken 1935
- HSwMS Gäddan (1915), stricken 1931

Abborren class

- HSwMS Abborren (1916), stricken 1937
- HSwMS Braxen (1916), stricken 1937

Hajen class

- HSwMS Hajen (1917), stricken 1943, broken up 1944
- HSwMS Sälen (1918), stricken 1942, broken up 1946
- HSwMS Valrossen (1918), stricken 1943, broken up 1944

Bävern class

- HSwMS Bävern (1921), stricken 1944, broken up 1956
- HSwMS Illern (1921), sunk 1943, salvaged, broken up 1944
- HSwMS Uttern (1921), stricken 1944, broken up

Valen class

- HSwMS Valen (1925), stricken 1944

Draken class

- HSwMS Draken (1926), stricken 1948
- HSwMS Gripen (1928), stricken 1947
- HSwMS Ulven (1930), sunk 15 april 1943, salvaged and broken up

Delfinen class

- HSwMS Delfinen (1934), sold 1957, broken up
- HSwMS Nordkaparen (1935), sold 1958, broken up
- HSwMS Springaren (1935), sold 1956, broken up

Sjölejonet class

- HSwMS Sjölejonet (1936), stricken 1959
- HSwMS Sjöbjörnen (1937), stricken 1964
- HSwMS Sjöhunden (1938), stricken 1960
- HSwMS Svärdfisken (1940), stricken 1959
- HSwMS Tumlaren (1940), stricken 1964
- HSwMS Dykaren, stricken 1959
- HSwMS Sjöhästen (1940), stricken 1963
- HSwMS Sjöormen (1941), stricken 1964
- HSwMS Sjöborren (1941), stricken 1959

Neptun class

- HSwMS Neptun (1942), stricken 1966
- HSwMS Najad (1942), stricken 1966
- HSwMS Näcken (1942), stricken 1966

Kust class (1941–1944)

- HSwMS U1 (1941), stricken 1960
- HSwMS U2 (1942), stricken 1960
- HSwMS U3 (1942) (sv:HMS U3), stricken 1964, now on display at the Museum of Technology and Maritime History in Malmö.
- HSwMS U4 (1943) - rebuilt as the attack submarine HMS Forellen, stricken 1970
- HSwMS U5 (1943) - rebuilt as the attack submarine HMS Aborren, stricken 1976
- HSwMS U6 (1943) - rebuilt as the attack submarine HMS Siken, stricken 1975
- HSwMS U7 (1943) - rebuilt as the attack submarine HMS Gäddan, stricken 1973
- HSwMS U8 (1944) - rebuilt as the attack submarine HMS Laxen, stricken 1976
- HSwMS U9 (1944) - rebuilt as the attack submarine HMS Makrillen, stricken 1976

Hajen class (1954–1958)

- HSwMS Hajen (1954)
- HSwMS Sälen (Säl)
- HSwMS Valen (Val)
- HSwMS Bävern (1958)
- HSwMS Illern (1957)
- HSwMS Uttern (1958)

Draken class (1960–1961)

- HSwMS Draken (Dra)
- HSwMS Gripen (Gri)
- HSwMS Vargen (Vgn)
- HSwMS Delfinen (Del)
- HSwMS Nordkaparen (Nor)
- HSwMS Springaren (Spr)

Sjöormen class (1967–1968)

- HSwMS Sjöormen (Sor)
- HSwMS Sjölejonet (Sle)
- HSwMS Sjöhunden (Shu)
- HSwMS Sjöbjörnen (Sbj)
- HSwMS Sjöhästen (Shä)

Näcken class (1978–1979)

- HSwMS Näcken (Näk)
- HSwMS Najad (Nad)
- HSwMS Neptun (Nep)

Södermanland class (2003–2004)

- HSwMS Östergötland (Ögd) - previous Västergötland class, decommissioned 2021, in material reserve.

=== Other ===
- HSwMS Hajen (1904), stricken 1922
- HSwMS Hvalen, sunk as target 1924
- HSwMS Delfinen (1914), stricken 1930
- HSwMS Spiggen (1958)
- HSwMS Spiggen (1990)

== Bibliography ==
- Saunders, Stephen, ed. (2004). Jane's Fighting Ships 2004–2005. Coulsdon, UK: Jane's Information Group. ISBN 0-7106-2623-1.
