= List of cruisers of the Swedish Navy =

Ships of the
Swedish Navy
Capital ships
Coastal defence ships
Corvettes
Cruisers
Destroyers
Frigates
Mine warfare vessels
Monitors
Patrol vessels
Gunboats
Sloops of war
Submarines
Torpedo boats

This is a list of Swedish cruisers of the period 1896-1945.

== Torpedo cruisers ==
Örnen-class cruiser

- HSwMS Örnen (1896)
- HSwMS Jacob Bagge (1898)
- HSwMS Claes Horn (1898)
- HSwMS Claes Uggla (1899)
- HSwMS Psilander (1899)

== Armoured cruisers ==
- HSwMS Fylgia (1905)

== Mine cruisers ==
- HSwMS Clas Fleming (1912)

== Aircraft cruisers ==
- HSwMS Gotland (1933)

== Cruisers ==
Tre Kronor-class cruiser

- HSwMS Tre Kronor (1944)
- HSwMS Göta Lejon (1945)

== Gallery ==
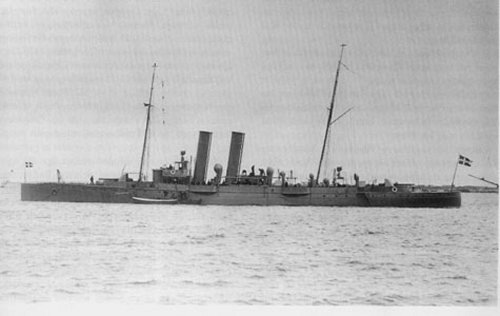
HSwMS Örnen was the first Swedish cruiser...

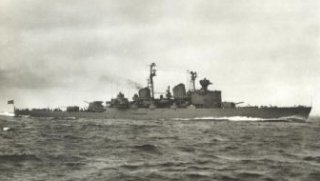
...and HSwMS Göta Lejon was the last one.
