= HDMS Nordkaperen =

HDMS Nordkaperen is the name of the following ships of the Royal Danish Navy:

- HDMS Nordkaperen (1918), a torpedo boat that was scuttled in 1943
- HDMS Nordkaperen (S321), a Narhvalen-class submarine in commission 1970–2004
