= HSwMS Sköld =

1868 Swedish river monitor

History

Sweden
- Name: HSwMS Sköld
- Namesake: Shield
- Builder: Bergsund, Stockholm
- Launched: 1868
- Completed: 1868
- Fate: Sunk as a target, 1907

General characteristics
- Type: River monitor
- Displacement: 250 t (250 long tons) (deep load)
- Length: 31.93 m (104 ft 9 in)
- Beam: 6.81 m (22 ft 4 in)
- Draft: 2.31 m (7 ft 7 in)
- Installed power: 24 × rowers; 1 fire-tube boiler
- Propulsion: 1 shaft; 1 steam engine
- Speed: 4 knots (7.4 km/h; 4.6 mph)
- Complement: 40
- Armament: 1 × 267 mm (10.5 in) smoothbore gun
- Armor: Belt: 64 mm (2.5 in); Gun turret: 93–220 mm (3.7–8.7 in); Deck: 13 mm (0.5 in); Conning tower: 178 mm (7.0 in)

HSwMS Sköld was a small river monitor built for the Swedish Royal Skerry Artillery in the late 1860s. She was equipped with a dual propulsion system, both hand and steam-driven, although the hand-driven portion was removed early in the ship's career due to complaints from the crew. The ship was put into reserve in 1890 and used as a gunnery target in 1907.

== Design and description ==
In 1865 the Navy Minister, Baltzar J. van Platen, persuaded the Riksdag of the Estates to establish the Royal Skerry Artillery as part of the Swedish Army to defend the inner Swedish waters and protect the flanks of Swedish fortresses. This force was to be equipped with ten small monitors to operate in shallow waters that could navigate the Göta Canal system that linked Gothenburg (Swedish: Göteborg) on the west coast to Söderköping on the Baltic Sea.

HSwMS Sköld (Swedish for 'Shield') was the second of these monitors. She was designed by the inventor John Ericsson and Lieutenant John Christian d'Ailly. The ship measured 31.93 meters (104 ft 9 in) long overall and had a beam of 6.81 meters (22 ft 4 in). She had a draft of 2.31 meters (7 ft 7 in) and displaced 250 metric tons (250 long tons). Her crew initially numbered 40 officers and men, but it was reduced to 29 when the rowing mechanism was removed early in the ship's career.

Sköld's most unusual feature was that John Ericsson designed, and had built in New York City, a combined hand and steam propulsion system. Seats for 24 rowers were placed in front of the steam engine and boiler and the rowers used levers and a crank connected to the propeller shaft to turn it fast enough to move the ship at a speed of 1.5 knots (2.8 km/h; 1.7 mph). The ship also had a single horizontal 2-cylinder steam engine that was powered by a single semi-circular fire-tube boiler. The monitor had a maximum speed under steam of 4 knots (7.4 km/h; 4.6 mph).

The ship was briefly armed with a single 267-millimeter (10.5 in) M/66 smoothbore gun, mounted in a long, fixed, oval-shaped turret, before being rearmed in 1870 with a 240-millimeter (9.4 in) M/69 rifled breech loader. The M/69 gun weighed 14,670 kilograms (32,340 lb) and fired projectiles at a muzzle velocity of 397 m/s (1,300 ft/s). At its maximum elevation of 7.5° the gun had a range of 3,500 meters (3,800 yd). During the late 1870s Sköld received a 10-barreled 12.17-millimeter (0.479 in) M/75 machine gun designed by Helge Palmcrantz. The machine gun weighed 115 kilograms (254 lb) and had a rate of fire of 500 rounds per minute. Its projectiles had a muzzle velocity of 386 m/s (1,270 ft/s) and a maximum range of 900 meters (980 yd).

Sköld had a complete waterline armor belt of wrought iron that was 64 millimeters (2.5 in) thick. The deck was 13 millimeters (0.5 in) thick. The gun turret's armor was 220 millimeters (8.7 in) thick on its face and 93 millimeters (3.7 in) on the sides and rear. The conning tower protruded from the top of the turret and was protected by 178 millimeters (7.0 in) of armor.

== Service ==
Sköld was built in 1868 by Bergsund at Stockholm. She was incorporated into the Swedish Navy in 1873. The ship's crew did not appreciate the hand-driven propulsion system; they had not joined the navy to be "galley slaves" and the system was soon removed. Sköld was placed in reserve in 1890 and sunk as a target in 1907. Curiously, the ship never once navigated the Göta Canal system in her career.
