= HSwMS Carlskrona =

Several ships of the Swedish Navy have been named HSwMS Carlskrona or HSwMS Karlskrona, named after the city of Karlskrona:

- Carlskrona (1686) was a ship launched in 1686 and sunk in 1730
- Karlskrona (1694) was a ship launched in 1694
- HSwMS Carlscrona (1749) was a galley launched in 1749
- HSwMS Carlskrona (1841) was a corvette launched in 1841 and sunk in 1846
- HSwMS Karlskrona (J8) was a Göteborg-class destroyer launched in 1939 and decommissioned in 1974
- HSwMS Carlskrona (P04) is a command ship launched in 1980 as the minelayer HSwMS Carlskrona (M04)
