= HSwMS Karl XIV Johan =

Swedish Navy sailing ship

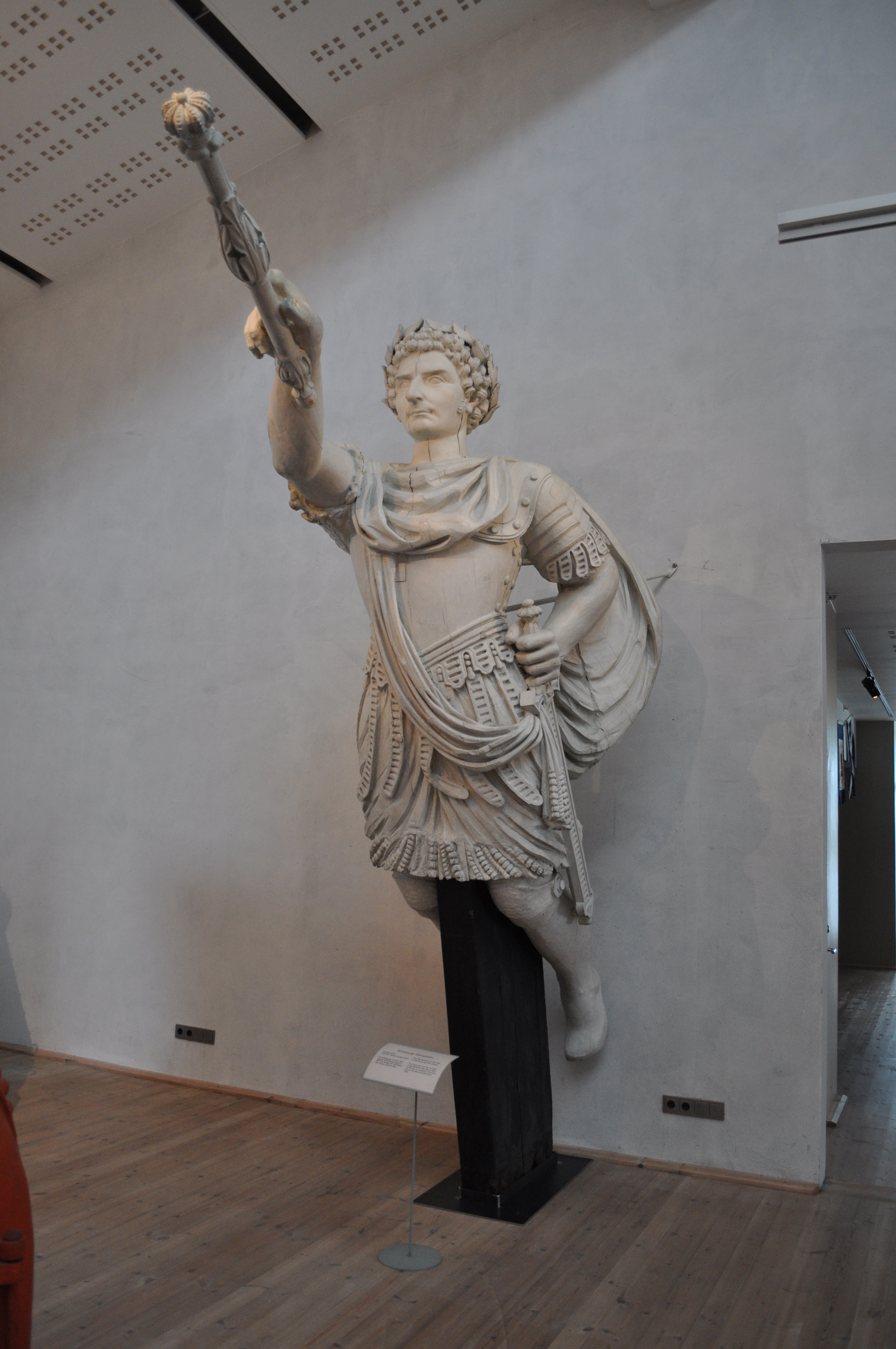
- HSwMS Karl XIV Johan figurehead at Karlskrona Marinmuseum, Sweden on 26 November 2009.

History

Sweden
- Name: Karl XIV Johan
- Namesake: Karl XIV Johan
- Builder: Karlskrona Naval Shipyard, Blekinge
- Laid down: 8 November 1817
- Launched: 10 November 1824
- Commissioned: 1835
- Decommissioned: 1867
- Fate: Scrapped, 1867

General characteristics
- Class & type: 84-gun ship of the line
- Displacement: 2608 tons
- Length: 64 m (210 ft) o/a
- Beam: 14.7 m (48 ft)
- Depth: 6.8 m (22 ft)
- Propulsion: 1 × Motala steam engine; 800 ihp (600 kW)
- Speed: 9 kn (17 km/h)
- Complement: 739
- Armament: 30 × 30-pdr cannons; 30 × 24-pdr cannons; 10 × 12-pdr cannons; 15 × 24-pdr caronades

HSwMS Karl XIV Johan was a ship of the line that served in the Swedish Navy and was built by Karlskrona Naval Shipyard. She was named after Karl XIV Johan. Commissioned in 1835 and decommissioned in 1867.

== Design and description ==
Karl XIV Johan was 53.8 meters long, 14.4 meters wide and had a draft of 6.8 meters. The machinery installed in 1854 consisted of four steam boilers that generated steam for a Motala angle steam engine. The total engine power was 800 indicated horsepower. The ship had a top speed of 6.5 knots under engine and 9 knots under sail. At the time of completion, the equipment consisted of 84 pieces of varying calibers. The crew amounted to 739 men.

== Construction and career ==
Karl XIV Johan was laid down by Karlskrona Naval Shipyard at their shipyard at Blekinge on 8 November 1817 and launched on 10 November 1824. She was commissioned in 1835. She did not see much service as she was scrapped in 1867.

== Gallery ==
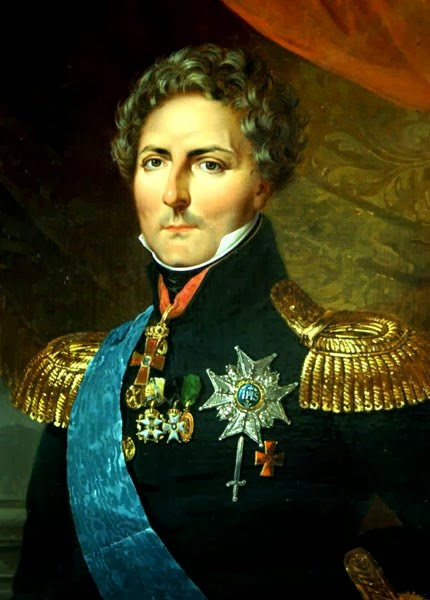
Karl XIV Johan circa 1830.
