= Altair-class training ship =

Swedish class of training ships

Altair-class
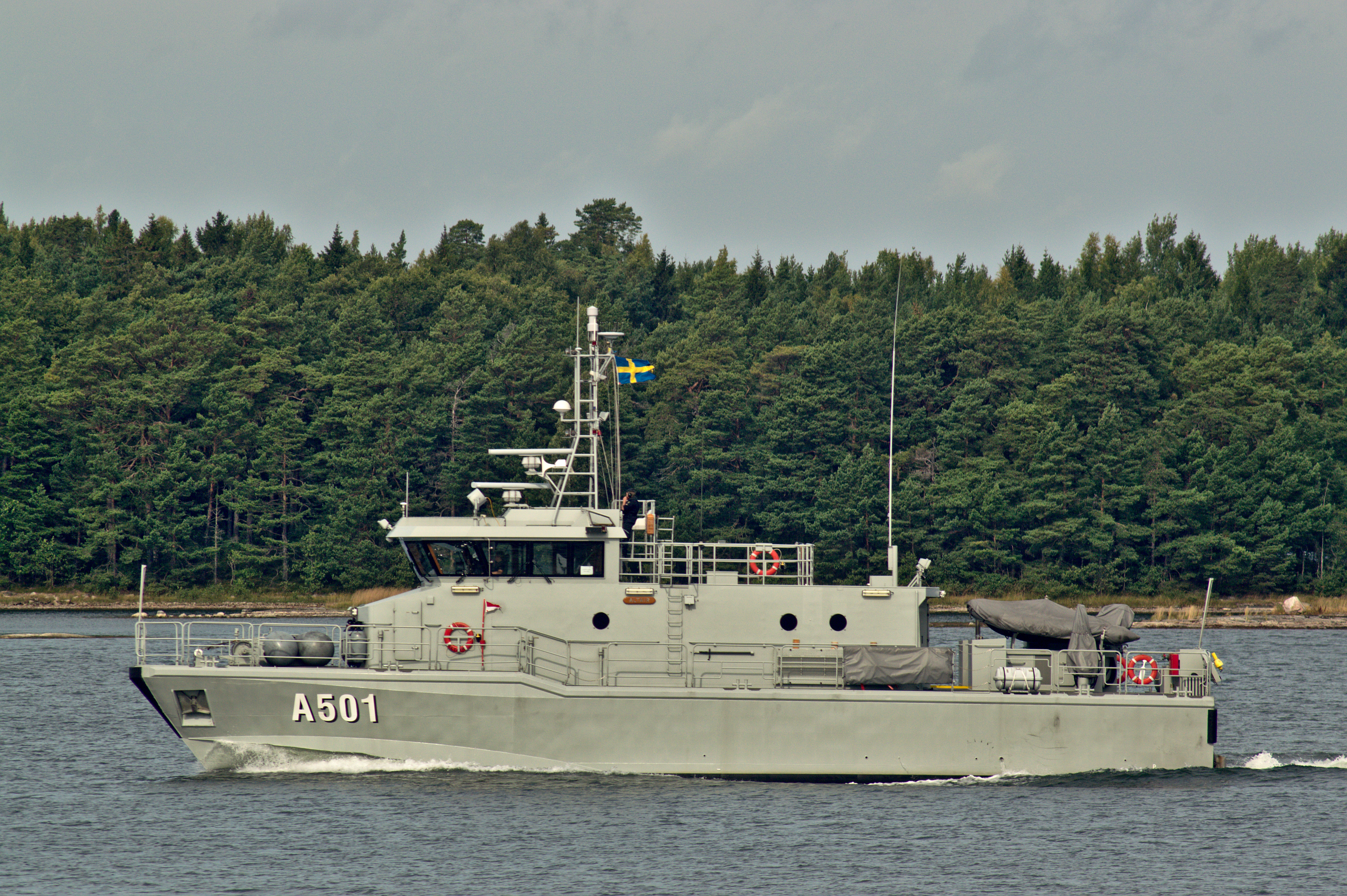
- Altair outside of Ornö, 2015

Class overview
- Builders: Swede Ship Marine
- Operators: Swedish Navy
- Cost: SEK 26 million (2008)
- Built: 2007–2009
- In commission: 2008–present
- Planned: 6 vessels
- Completed: 5 vessels

General characteristics
- Type: Training ship
- Displacement: 85.0 tonnes (13,390 st)
- Length: 25.9 metres (85 ft 0 in)
- Beam: 6.0 metres (19 ft 8 in)
- Draft: 1.4 metres (4 ft 7 in)
- Speed: 21 knots (39 km/h; 24 mph)
- Complement: 10 seamen

The Altair-class is a series of training ships in use by the Swedish Navy.

== History ==
In the early 2000s, after the ageing fleet of outdated World War II-era minesweepers used as training ships could no longer meet safety requirements for operation, the Swedish Defence Materiel Administration sought an existing ship class to commission. However, strict requirements made this unfeasible.

As a result, a new project was launched in 2004 to domestically design a vessel that could meet all the criteria put forward. This decision ultimately proved to deliver not only more suitable ships but also greater cost-effectiveness. Despite this, the original plan to acquire six ships of the class proved too costly, and only five ships could be commissioned within the available budget.

Construction of the vessels began shortly thereafter, with deliveries taking place between 2007 and 2009.

=== Etymology ===
The ships of the class were first named in 2009 through a collective agreement by the then Chief of Defence, Håkan Syrén, the Chief of Navy, Anders Grenstad, and the Chief of Materiel, Leif Nylander. The names adopted were the last five names of the earlier naming convention of the Swedish Plejad-class torpedo boats, in which all vessels are named after well-known stars and constellations.

=== Mid-life refit ===
Between 2026 and 2028, all five ships of the class are scheduled to undergo mid-life refits, primarily to modernise outdated electronic systems, beginning with Argo.

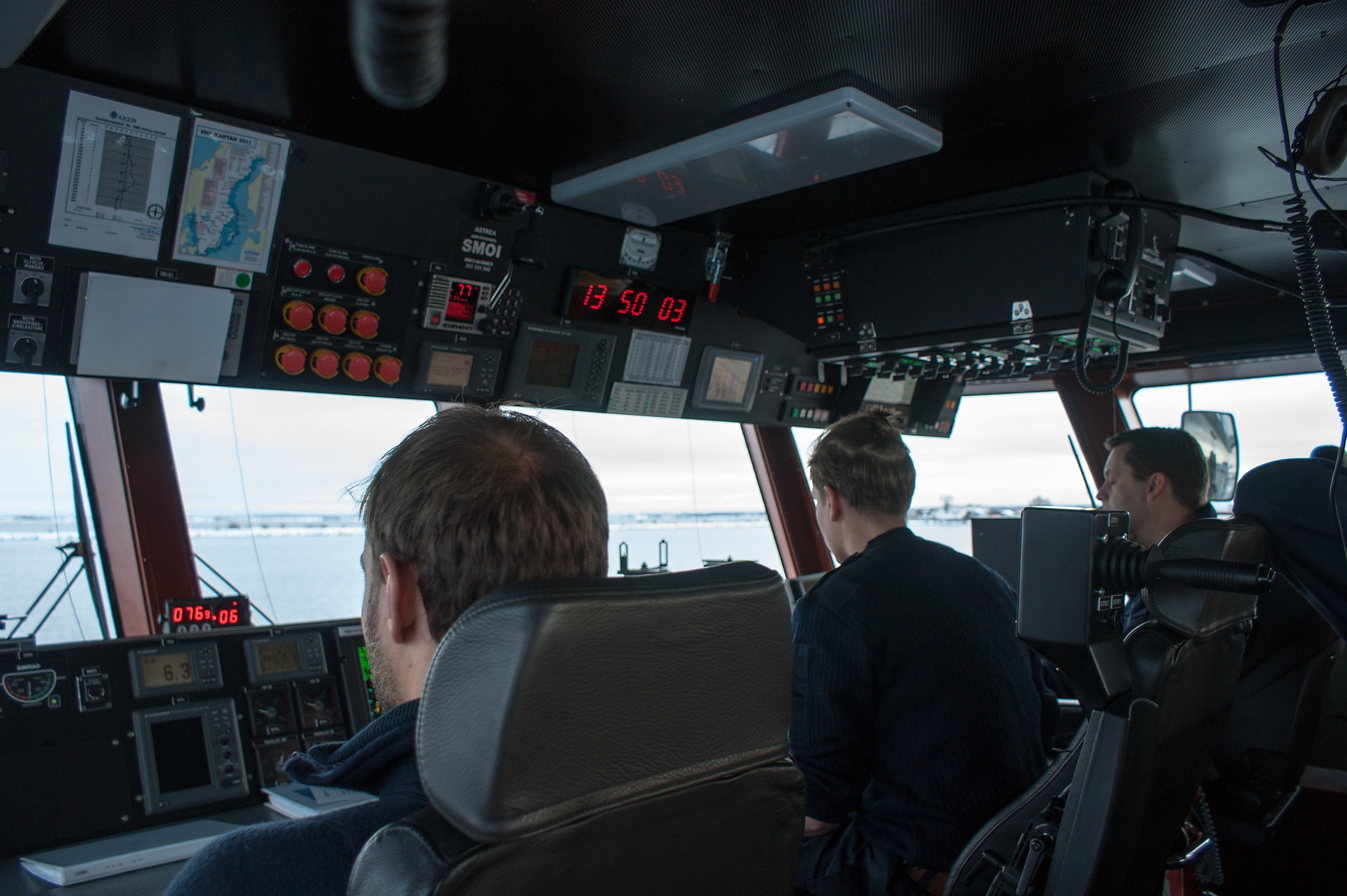
Cabin of Astrea

== Design ==
Although designed, built, and primarily used as training ships, the class is multifunctional and can assume combat roles if required. Each vessel is capable of being modified into a sonobuoy platform, similar to HSwMS Ejdern, for use in anti-submarine warfare. Additionally, a heavy machine gun can be fitted as part of the original design.

As training ships, the aluminium hulls of the Altair-class vessels are relatively small compared to those of regular warships, measuring 25.9 metres (85 ft 0 in) in length with a beam of 6.0 metres (19 ft 8 in), and displacing a maximum of 85.0 tonnes (13,390 st) of water, resulting in a draught of approximately 1.4 metres (4 ft 7 in). All in all, the expected service life of these vessels is approximately 25 years.

For propulsion, the vessels are fitted with two 930 kilowatts (1,250 hp) MTU diesel engines, providing a combined output of 1,860 kilowatts (2,490 hp) and enabling a maximum speed of approximately 21 knots (39 km/h; 24 mph).

Complementing the ships, the design allows for 10 personnel to work on each vessel simultaneously, with six students in training and four officers and enlisted crew members on board.

== Units ==
Pennant number	Ship name	Delivered	Status
A501	Altair	12 May 2008	Active (Reffiting)
A502	Antares	22 September 2008	Active
A503	Arcturus	5 December 2008	Active
A504	Argo	13 February 2009	Active
A505	Astrea	7 May 2009	Active

== Sources ==
- Petersson, Ulf (2008). "Egenutvecklade skolfartyg bästa lösningen" (PDF). Protec (in Swedish) (3): 10–11. 0346-9611. Archived from the original (PDF) on 13 August 2010.
- Sannerman, Carola (29 September 2008). "Skoldivisionens nya profil". forsvarsmakten.se (in Swedish).
- Ivansson, Hans (17 February 2009). "Nya skolfartyg till marinen". fmv.se (in Swedish). Archived from the original on 16 October 2012.
- Försvarsmakten (11 February 2021). "Skolfartyg Altair". forsvarsmakten.se (in Swedish).
- Östhammar (21 April 2023). "Sjöstridsskolan gästar Öregrund". osthammar.se (in Swedish).
- Genestig, Johan (10 July 2026). "FMV uppgraderar fem av Försvarsmaktens skolfartyg". Swedish Defence Materiel Administration (in Swedish).
