= HSwMS Orust =

HSwMS Orust (M41) was the lead ship of her class of two Swedish minesweepers. It was used to train new recruits. It was originally a trawler.

== Bibliography ==
- Westerlund, Karl-Eric & Chumbley, Stephen (1995). "Sweden". In Chumbley, Stephen (ed.). Conway's All The World's Fighting Ships 1947–1995. Annapolis, Maryland: Naval Institute Press. pp. 443–453. ISBN 1-55750-132-7.
