= HSwMS M20 =

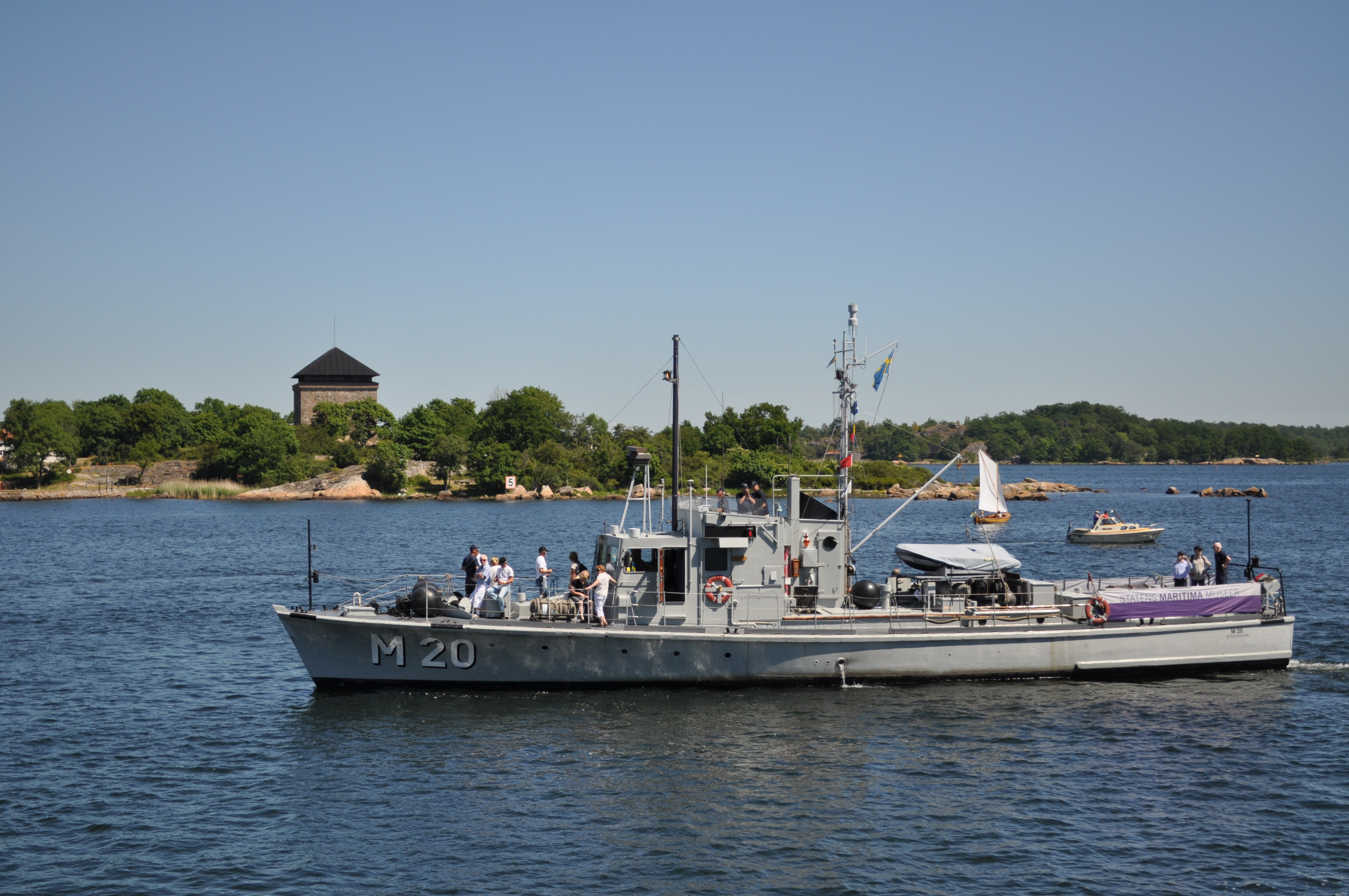
- M 20

History

Sweden
- Name: M 20
- Launched: 1941
- Commissioned: 18 December 1941
- Decommissioned: 2005
- Status: Museum ship

General characteristics
- Type: Minesweeper
- Displacement: 70 long tons (71 t)
- Length: 27 m (88 ft 7 in)
- Beam: 5 m (16 ft 5 in)
- Draught: 1.5 m (4 ft 11 in)
- Speed: 13 knots (24 km/h; 15 mph)
- Armament: • 1× 20 mm cannon

HSwMS M 20 was a minesweeper that served in the Swedish Navy. Built in 1941 of mahogany on a steel frame, she was in service from 1941 until 2005.

Decommissioned in 2005 she is now owned by SMM (Swedish Maritime Museums) and operated and maintained by the association "Föreningen M 20".
