= Karlskrona Naval Base =

Naval Port of Karlskrona
UNESCO World Heritage Site
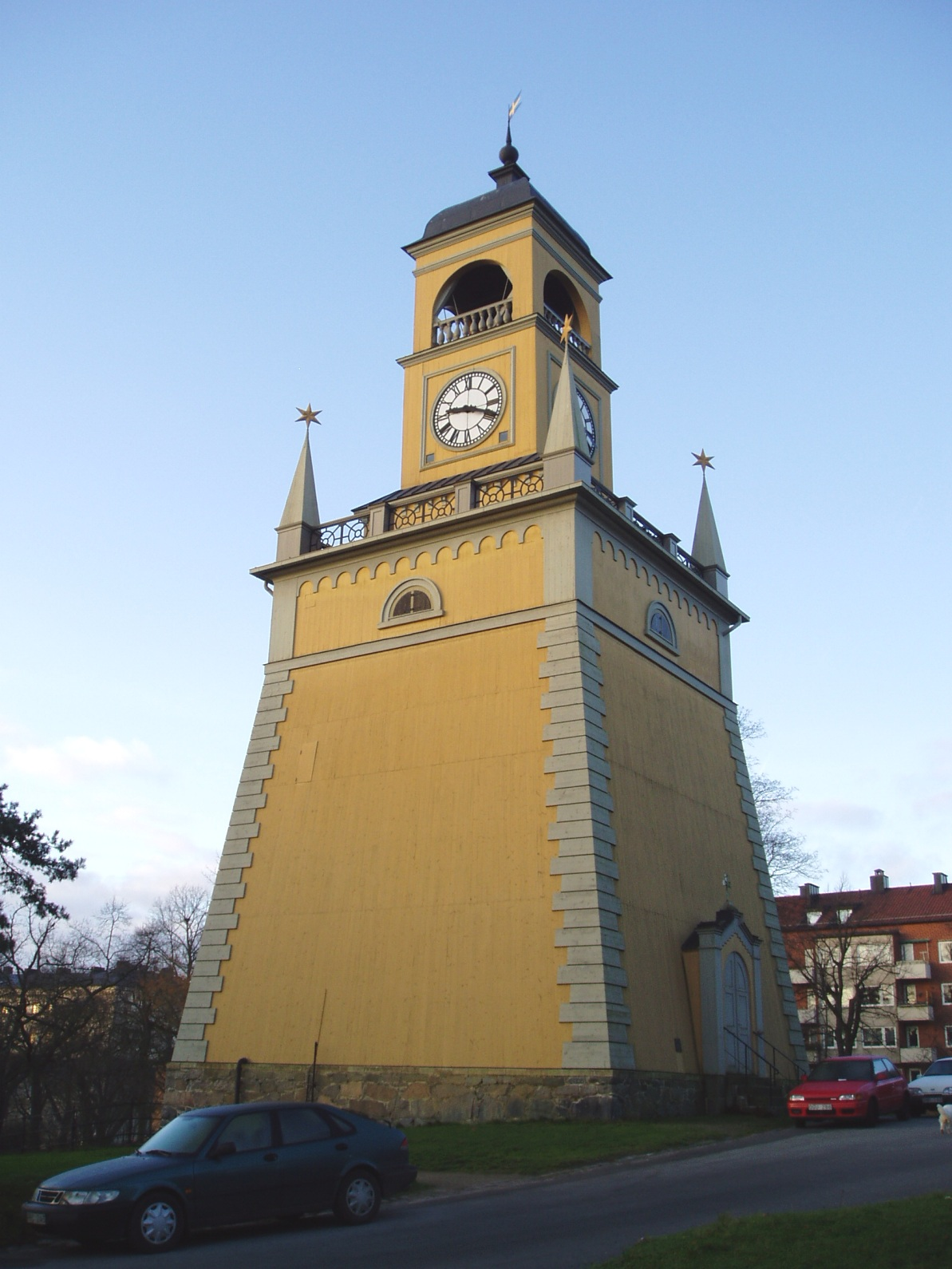
- bell tower (Admiralstorn)

- Location within Blekinge Location within Sweden
- Location: Karlskrona Municipality, Blekinge County, Sweden
- Includes: 1. Karlskrona and the Island of Trossö; 2. Mjölnarholmen; 3. Koholmen; 4. Kungshall (Basareholmen); 5. Godnatt; 6. Kurrholmen; 7. Ljungskär; 8. Crown Mill at Lyckeby (Kronokvarnen); 9. Kungsholms Fort; 10. Drottningskärs Citadel (Kastellet); 11. Skärva
- Criteria: Cultural: (ii), (iv)
- Reference: 871
- Inscription: 1998 (22nd Session)
- Area: 320.4 ha (792 acres)
- Buffer zone: 1,105.1 ha (2,731 acres)
- Coordinates: 56°09′22″N 15°35′11″E

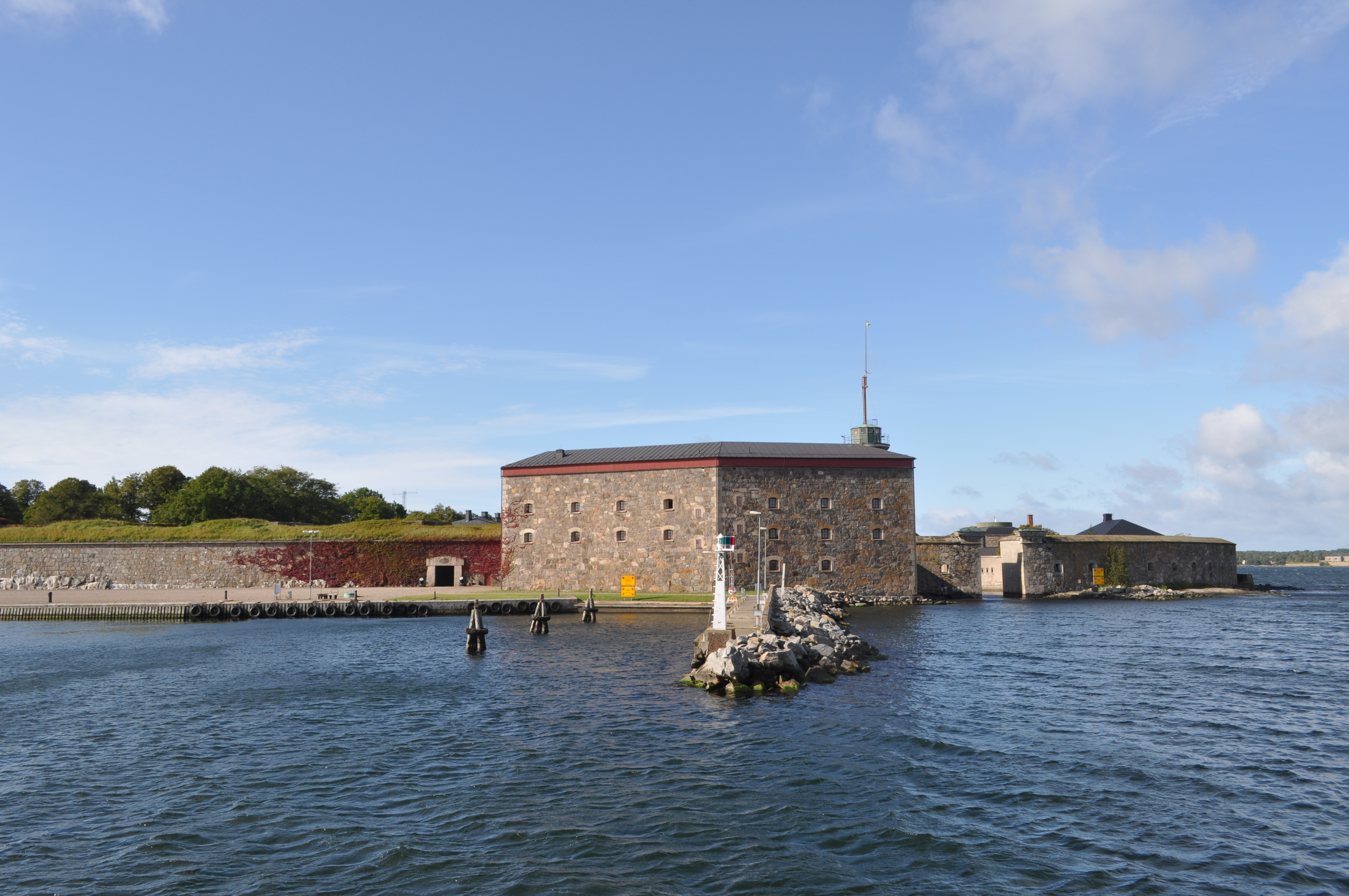
Donjon of Kungsholms Fort

The Karlskrona Naval Base (Swedish: Karlskrona örlogsbas) is the largest naval base of the Swedish Navy. Located in Blekinge in southern Sweden, the base has close ties with the city of Karlskrona. It has an exceptionally well-sheltered location: arcs of islands provide a strong defense not only from the sea but also from land attacks. Two of Sweden's three naval warfare flotillas are based there. It contains the Marinmuseum and the Ropewalk, the longest wooden building in the country.

== History ==
After Sweden and Denmark ceased hostilities after the Scanian War (1675–1679), King Charles XI of Sweden made a reconnaissance trip in the eastern part of the Blekinge archipelago. The king decreed the construction of a city named "Carlscroona" on the island of Trossön. The major reason for its establishment was to provide the Swedish Navy with a permanent base closer to Denmark, which throughout the 17th century had been the foremost enemy of Sweden. In addition, a shipyard was needed for both construction and repair of ships, as well as for supply depots and barracks. The new base had the added advantage of being free of ice in winter, unlike the base in Stockholm which had until then been the principal base of the navy. A plan for the base was laid forth by quartermaster general Erik Dahlbergh in 1683, and construction was started two years later. The new city of Karlskrona received its city privileges in 1680.

An international incident occurred on October 27, 1981, when the Soviet Whiskey-class submarine S-363 ran aground approximately 10 km from Karlskrona, in an event sometimes called "Whiskey on the rocks".

== Ships ==
The base contains ships and vessels from the Swedish 1st Submarine Flotilla and the 3rd Naval Warfare Flotilla.

- Södermanland-class submarine, 2 ships
- Gotland-class submarine, 3 ships
- Stockholm-class corvette, 2 ships
- Visby-class corvette, 3 ships
- Tapper-class patrol boats, 3 ships
- Koster-class mine countermeasures vessel, 2 ships
- Styrsö-class mine countermeasures vessel, 1 ship
- Altair-class training ship, 5 ships
- Support ship HSwMS Carlskrona

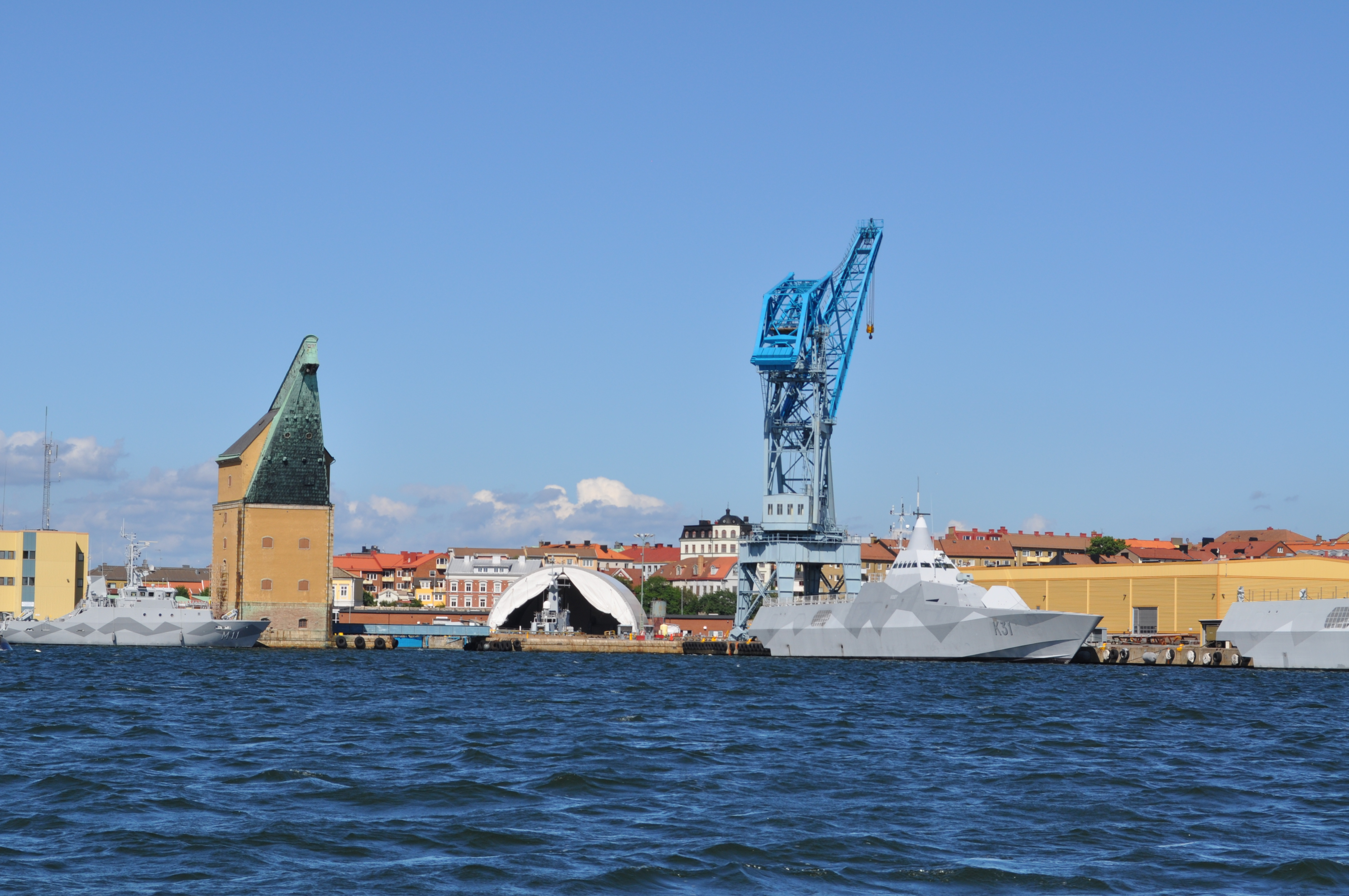
Two Visby-class corvettes and one Spårö class ship docked at the naval shipyard.

== See also ==
- Vega expedition
- Naval Base
