= HSwMS Komet =

Swedish torpedo boat

- Komet in a 1899 illustration of the Swedish Navy

History

Sweden
- Name: Komet (1896–1916); Vedettbåten V20 (1916–1922)
- Builder: F. Schichau, Elbing
- Launched: 4 June 1896
- Acquired: 12 August 1896
- Fate: Laid up, 1922

General characteristics
- Type: Torpedo boat
- Displacement: 92 t (91 long tons)
- Length: 39 m (127 ft 11 in)
- Beam: 4.8 m (15 ft 9 in)
- Draft: 2.3 m (7 ft 7 in)
- Speed: 23 knots (43 km/h; 26 mph)
- Complement: 18
- Armament: 2 × 38.1 cm (15.0 in) torpedo tubes; 2 × 4.7 cm (1.9 in) guns

HSwMS Komet was a torpedo boat of the Swedish Navy. Launched in 1896 as part of a modernization effort, she operated off the Swedish coast. The ship was the first Swedish torpedo boat faster than 20 knots (37 km/h; 23 mph), and served as a prototype for the eleven Blixt-class torpedo boats. Komet was redesignated in 1916 and renamed Vedettbåten V20 before she was laid up in 1922 and scrapped in 1926.

== Development and design ==
In the late 20th century, the Swedish Navy focused on defending the country's coast and modernized after the Imperial Russian Navy's Baltic Fleet was similarly modernized. The Swedish Navy ordered a torpedo boat from the F. Schichau shipyard in Elbing, which at the time was part of the German Empire. The company had previously designed and built torpedo boats to other Nordic nations. The resulting ship, Komet, featured a length of 39 metres (127 ft 11 in), beam of 4.8 metres (15 ft 9 in), draft of 2.3 metres (7 ft 7 in), fully loaded displacement of 92 tonnes (91 long tons), and compliment of 18. She was propelled by one fire-tube boiler that produced steam for a three-cylinder triple expansion steam engine that output 1,056 indicated horsepower (787 kW) and turned one propeller to achieve a top speed of 23 knots (43 km/h; 26 mph). The torpedo boat had a range of 1,000 nautical miles (1,900 km; 1,200 mi) at a cruising speed of 10 knots (19 km/h; 12 mph). Armament consisted of two 38.1 cm (15.0 in) torpedo tubes—one mounted in the bow and the other on a trainable mount aft—along with two 4.7 cm (1.9 in) M/95 guns, one mounted aft and another on top of the conning tower.

Komet was the first Swedish torpedo boat faster than 20 knots (37 km/h; 23 mph). Her design was modified to include a second boiler and funnel to produce the eleven Blixt-class torpedo boats that were built in Sweden. The vessels are also considered to be one class of a dozen, known as the Komet class, with Komet serving as the lead ship and prototype.

== Service history ==
Komet was laid down at the shipyard on 4 June 1896 and delivered on 12 August 1896. Funds for her construction was raised by The Women's Association for Sweden's Naval Defense (Kvinnoförbundet för Sveriges Sjöförsvar), a society of women who raised money for Swedish warships and promoted the Navy.The Navy designated Komet as a 1st rate torpedo boat as she displaced more than 60 tonnes (59 long tons). As the largest type of torpedo boat, they were intended to operate off the Swedish coast and in the Swedish Archipelagos alongside 1st rate gunboats. In 1901, her two guns were replaced with 3.7 cm (1.5 in) M/98B rapid fire guns. In 1916, she was redesignated as a vedettbåt (type of patrol boat), had the torpedo tubes removed, and renamed Vedettbåten V20 with the hull number V20. She was laid up six years later and scrapped in 1926.
