= List of gunboats of the Swedish Navy =

Ships of the
Swedish Navy
Capital ships
Coastal defence ships
Corvettes
Cruisers
Destroyers
Frigates
Mine warfare vessels
Monitors
Patrol vessels
Gunboats
Sloops of war
Submarines
Torpedo boats

This is a list of Swedish gunboats.

== 1st class ==
- HSwMS Blenda (1874)
- HSwMS Disa (1877)
- HSwMS Edda (1882)
- HSwMS Rota (1878)
- HSwMS Skagul (1878)
- HSwMS Skuld (1879)
- HSwMS Skäggald (1878)
- HSwMS Urd (1877)
- HSwMS Verdande (1878)

== 2nd class ==
- HSwMS Alfhild (1862)
- HSwMS Aslög (1861)
- HSwMS Astrid (1861)
- HSwMS Carlsund (1860)
- HSwMS Gunhild (1862)
- HSwMS Hogland (1856)
- HSwMS Ingegerd (1862)
- HSwMS Motala (1860)
- HSwMS Sigrid (1862)
- HSwMS Svensksund (1856)
- HSwMS Svensksund (1891)
- HSwMS von Sydow (1850)
