= HSwMS Uttern =

Three warships of Sweden have been named Uttern, after Uttern:

- HSwMS Uttern (1672), a warship launched in 1672 and stricken in 1681–1682.
- HSwMS Uttern (1918), a Bävern-class submarine launched in 1918 and stricken in 1944.
- HSwMS Uttern (1958), a Hajen III-class submarine launched in 1958 and stricken in 1980.
