= HSwMS Bävern =

Two warships of Sweden have been named Bävern, after Bävern:

- HSwMS Bävern (1921), a Bävern-class submarine launched in 1921 and stricken in 1944.
- HSwMS Bävern (1958), a Hajen III-class submarine launched in 1958 and stricken in 1980.
