= HSwMS Valen =

Two warships of Sweden have been named Valen, after Valen:

- HSwMS Valen (1925), a mine-laying submarine launched in 1925 and stricken in 1944.
- HSwMS Valen (1955), a Hajen III-class submarine launched in 1955 and stricken in 1980.
