= HSwMS Illern =

Two warships of Sweden have been named Illern, after Illern:

- HSwMS Illern (1918), a Bävern-class submarine launched in 1918 and sunk in 1943.
- HSwMS Illern (1957), a Hajen III-class submarine launched in 1957 and stricken in 1980.
