= HSwMS Valen (1925) =

Swedish mine-laying submarine

History

Sweden
- Name: Valen
- Builder: Karlskrona Navy Yard
- Laid down: 1923
- Launched: 5 May 1925
- Commissioned: 4 September 1925
- Fate: Stricken 6 October 1944

General characteristics
- Type: Mine-laying submarine
- Displacement: Surfaced: 548 tons; Submerged: 730 tons
- Length: 57.10 m (187 ft 4 in)
- Beam: 7.11 m (23 ft 4 in)
- Draft: 3.10 m (10 ft 2 in)
- Speed: Surfaced: 14.8 knots (27.4 km/h; 17.0 mph); Submerged: 7.4 knots (13.7 km/h; 8.5 mph)
- Complement: 31
- Armament: 4 × 450 mm (18 in) torpedo tubes; 1 × 75 mm (3.0 in) anti-air gun; 1 × 25 mm (0.98 in) anti-air gun; 10 × minelaying tubes; 20 × naval mines

HSwMS Valen was the first mine-laying submarine of the Swedish Navy and the only boat of her class. Her design was based on the earlier Bävern-class submarine, itself a derivative of the German Type UB-III U-boat. She was laid down in 1923 and commissioned in 1925 and had an uneventful service life. By World War II, her design was used to build six more modern mine-laying boats, and she was stricken in 1944.

== Design and development ==
During and after World War I, the Swedish Navy ordered submarines based on German designs. The submarines were modified versions of the Type UB-III U-boat design, with the rear torpedo tube removed. The design was used to build the six boats of the Hajen and Bävern classes, which all launched by 1921. By the mid-1920s, Swedish naval authorities were impressed by the performance of German submarine minelayers during the war, and ordered their own. The design of Valen consisted of a Bävern-class submarine with ten vertical mine-laying tubes installed along the ballast tanks.

The design featured a length of 57.10 metres (187 ft 4 in), beam of 7.11 metres (23 ft 4 in), and a draught of 3.10 metres (10 ft 2 in), and a complement of 31. Aside from her aforementioned mine-laying tubes, her armament consisted of four 450 mm (18 in) torpedo tubes, a 75 mm (3.0 in) anti-air gun, one 25 mm (0.98 in), and 25 naval mines. She was propelled by two Atlas diesel engines and two electric motors which produced 1,340 brake horsepower (1,000 kW) and 700 horsepower (520 kW) through two propellers. While surfaced, the submarine had a maximum speed of 14.8 knots (27.4 km/h; 17.0 mph) and displaced 548 tons and had a speed of 7.4 knots (13.7 km/h; 8.5 mph) and displaced 730 tons while submerged.

== Service history ==
Valen was laid down at the Karlskrona Navy Yard in 1923, launched on 5 May 1925, and commissioned on 4 September 1925. The Swedish Navy continued to order more minelaying submarines based on Valen, which was followed by the three Delfinen-class submarines in 1934 and Neptun-class trio in 1942. All of the submarines retained Valen's system of launching twenty mines through vertical tubes. By World War II, the old submarine was decommissioned on 6 October 1944.
