= HSwMS Hajen =

Three warships of Sweden have been named Hajen, after Hajen:

- HSwMS Hajen (1904), a submarine launched in 1904 and stricken in 1922.
- HSwMS Hajen (1917), a Hajen II-class submarine launched in 1917 and stricken in 1943.
- HSwMS Hajen (1954), a Hajen III-class submarine launched in 1954 and stricken in 1980.
