= HSwMS Sälen =

Two warships of Sweden have been named Sälen, after Sälen in the Dalarna of Svealand:

- HSwMS Sälen (1918), a Hajen II-class submarine launched in 1918 and stricken in 1943.
- HSwMS Sälen (1955), a Hajen III-class submarine launched in 1954 and stricken in 1980.
