= Delfinen-class submarine =

Delfinen-class submarine may refer to:

- Swedish Delfinen-class submarine, operated by the Swedish Navy between 1936 and 1953
- Danish Delfinen-class submarine, operated by the Danish Navy between 1961 and 1990
