= Collision between a car and a submarine =

1961 incident in Lysekil, Sweden

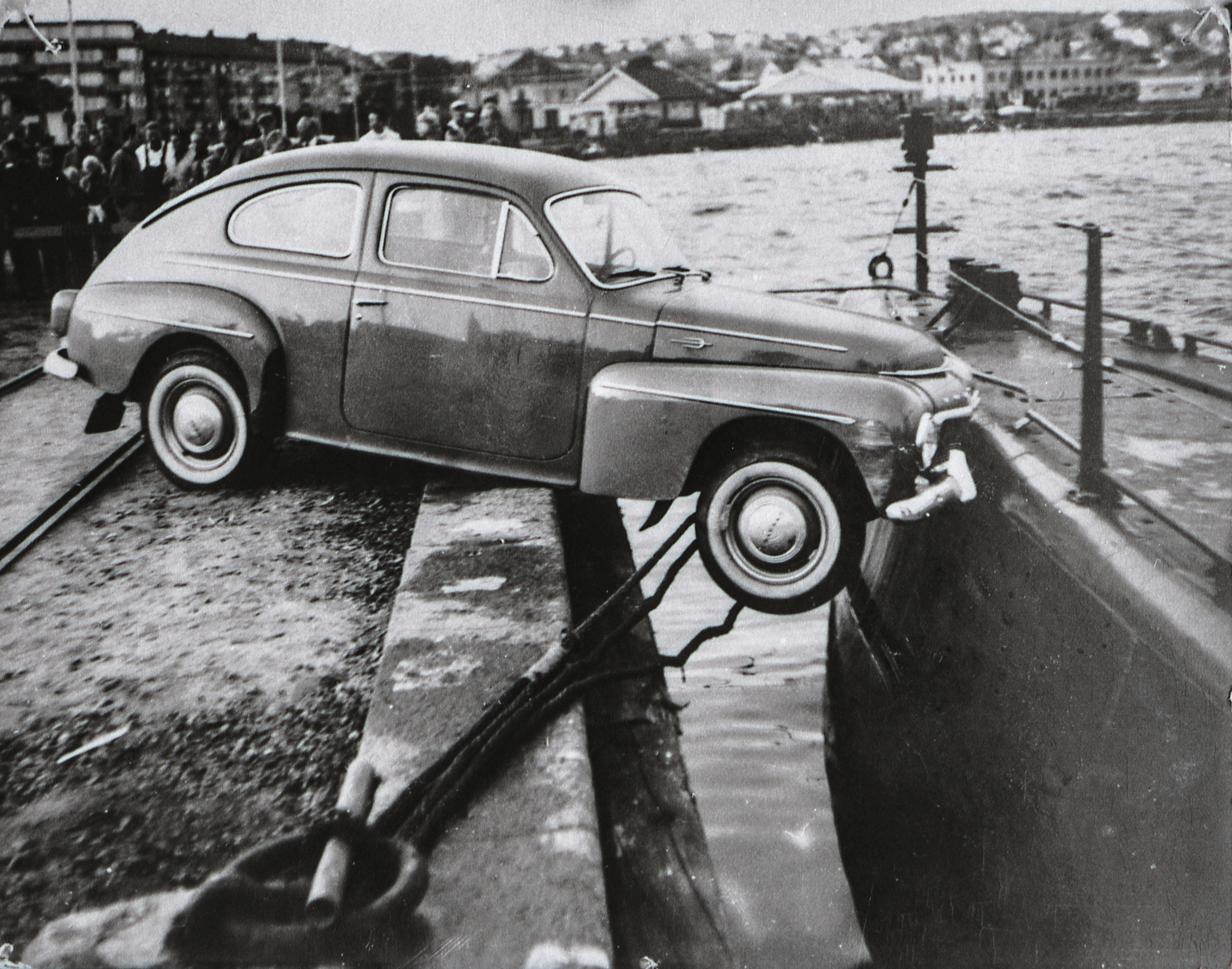
- Photo of the collision
- Date: 19 August 1961
- Location: Lysekil, Sweden; 58.273611°N 11.438333°E
- Deaths: 0
- Injuries: 0

On 19 August 1961, a driverless Volvo PV544 crashed into the docked submarine HSwMS Bävern in Lysekil, Sweden. It is the only known collision between a car and a submarine.

== Collision ==
A Volvo PV544 was parked by the telephone exchange building at Fiskaregatan (Fisher's street), near the South Harbor in Lysekil. The car's driver did not notice that the parking lot was sloped, and did not use the handbrake before leaving the car. The car began to move downhill towards the sea, and after passing by a shipment of herring, it crossed the Södra-Hamngatan (Southern harbor street) and crashed into the bow of the HSwMS Bävern docked at the pier. As a result of the collision, the front part of the car was crushed, and the submarine's rail was dented. No people were hurt as a result of the collision. Bävern continued its service until 1980.

== In culture ==
The aftermath of the collision was captured in a photograph by Hans Johansson, editor of the local Kuriren newspaper, who happened to witness the collision. The incident was reported by the Swedish TT News Agency. It was also described in a 2004 book Röd storm by Terje Fredh.
