= Swedish Delfinen-class submarine =

Swedish mine-laying submarine

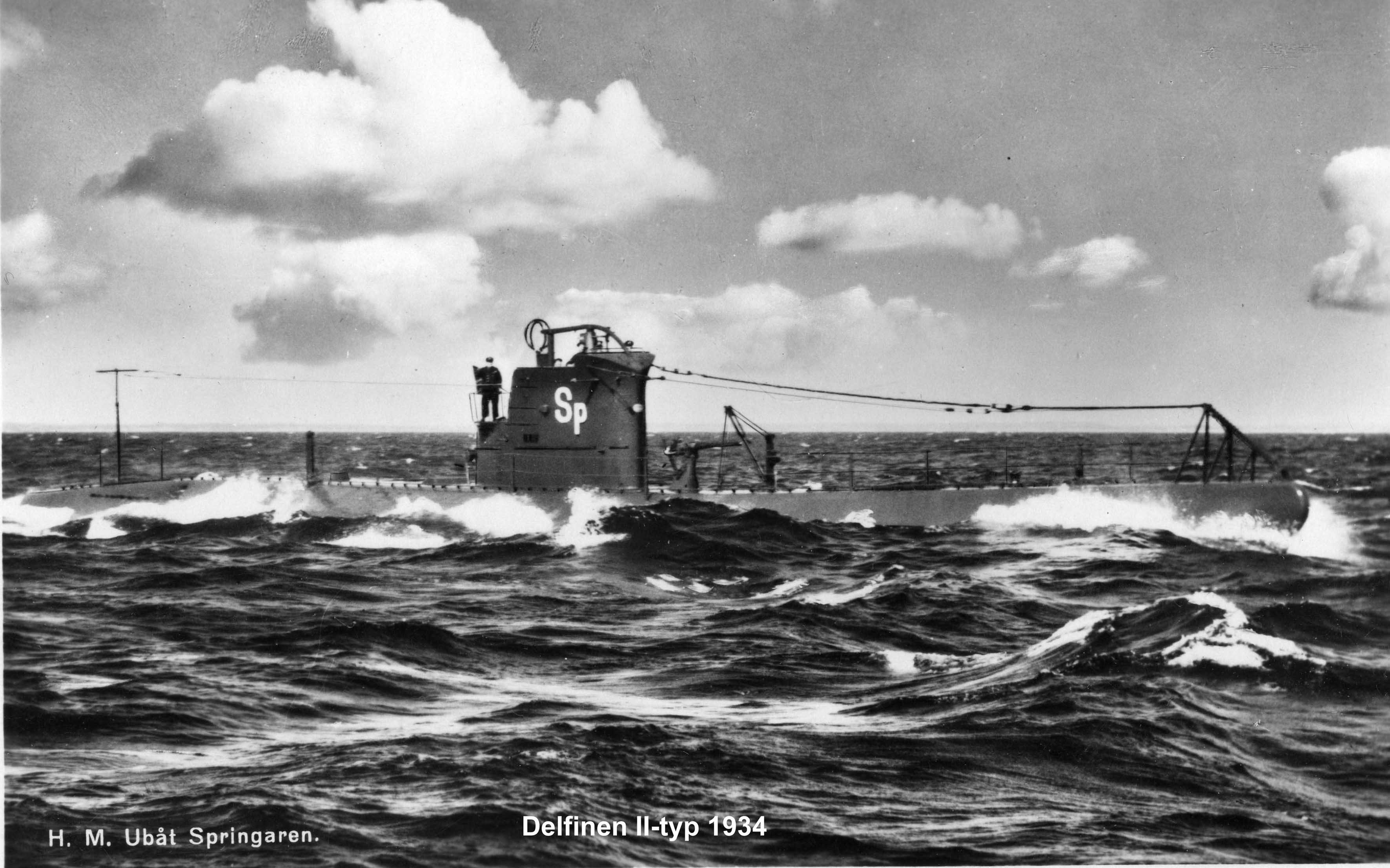
- HSwMS Springaren in 1935

Class overview
- Name: Delfinen class
- Builders: Kockums
- Operators: Swedish Navy
- Preceded by: HSwMS Valen
- Succeeded by: Neptun class
- In service: 1936–1953
- Completed: 3
- Scrapped: 3

General characteristics
- Type: Mine-laying submarine
- Displacement: Surfaced: 540 tons; Submerged: 720 tons
- Length: 63.09 m (207 ft 0 in)
- Beam: 6.40 m (21 ft 0 in)
- Draft: 3.40 m (11 ft 2 in)
- Installed power: Surfaced: 1,200 bhp (890 kW); Submerged: 800 shp (600 kW)
- Propulsion: 2 × MAN diesel engines; 2 × electric motors 2 shafts
- Speed: Surfaced: 15 knots (28 km/h; 17 mph); Submerged: 9 knots (17 km/h; 10 mph)
- Complement: 34
- Armament: 4 × 533 mm (21.0 in) torpedo tubes; 1 × 57 mm (2.2 in) deck gun; 1 × 25 mm (0.98 in) anti-aircraft gun; 20 × naval mines

The Delfinen class was a trio of minelaying submarines operated by the Swedish Navy between 1936 and 1953. The boats were the first class of minelaying submarines in the Navy and were later used as the basis for further submarines developed immediately before and during World War II. They had an uneventful service history, and were all retired in 1953.

== Development and design ==
Following World War I, Swedish naval authorities were impressed by the performance of German minelaying submarines. As a result, they ordered the construction of HSwMS Valen, the first Swedish minelaying submarine. The design of Valen was followed up a decade later by the three Delfinen-class boats. Like their predecessors, the submarines were fitted with vertical tubes in the outer ballast tanks to launch naval mines. Design work was undertaken by NV Ingenieurskantoor voor Scheepsbouw, a clandestine Dutch front company intended to maintain German submarine experience to circumvent limitations placed by the Treaty of Versailles.

The design featured a length overall of 63.09 metres (207 ft 0 in), a beam of 6.40 metres (21 ft 0 in), and a draught of 3.40 metres (11 ft 2 in), with a complement of 34. Armament consisted of four 533 mm (21.0 in) torpedo tubes, three in the bow and one aft, along with a 57 mm (2.2 in) deck gun, one 25 mm (0.98 in) anti-aircraft gun, and up to 20 mines. They were powered by two MAN diesel engines and two electric motors, which developed 1,200 brake horsepower (890 kW) and 800 shaft horsepower (600 kW), respectively, which turned two propeller shafts. While surfaced, the class reached a top speed of 15 knots (28 km/h; 17 mph) and displaced 540 tons, and when submerged, they could make 9 knots (17 km/h; 10 mph), and displaced 720 tons.

== Service history ==
The three submarines were built by Kockums, and were all laid down in 1933. Each boat was commissioned by 1935, and were later used as the basis for further Swedish submarine designs. In 1936, the minelaying tubes were removed to produce the Sjölejonet-class coastal submarines, and an additional stern torpedo tube was added to produce the Neptun-class minelaying submarine in 1942.

== Ships in class ==
Data
Name	Laid down	Launched	Completed	Commissioned	Stricken
Delfinen	1933	20 December 1934	20 December 1934	22 April 1936	24 February 1953
Nordkaparen	1933	9 February 1935	9 February 1935	16 October 1936	24 February 1953
Springaren	1933	27 April 1935	27 April 1935	3 August 1937	24 February 1953
