= HSwMS Hajen (1954) =

Hajen-class submarine of the Swedish Navy

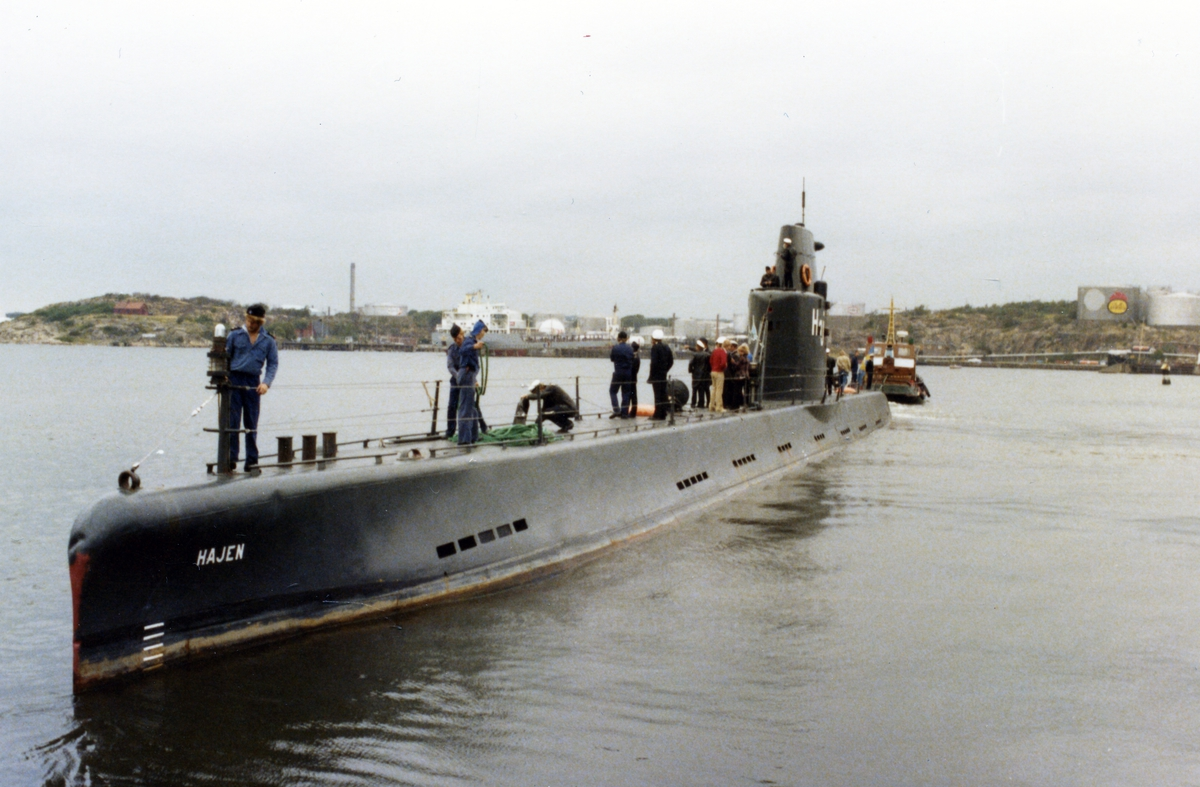
- Hajen in 1975

History

Sweden
- Name: Hajen
- Namesake: Swedish for shark
- Builder: Saab Kockums
- Launched: 11 December 1954
- Commissioned: 28 February 1957
- Decommissioned: 1 July 1980
- Identification: Hj; Haj
- Motto: Primus inter pares; (The foremost among equals)
- Fate: Scrapped, 1983

General characteristics
- Class & type: Hajen-class submarine
- Displacement: 720 t (709 long tons), surfaced; 900 t (886 long tons), submerged
- Length: 65.8 m (216 ft)
- Beam: 5.1 m (17 ft)
- Draught: 5.0 m (16.4 ft)
- Propulsion: 2 shaft diesel-electric; 2 Pielstick Diesels 1660 hp; 2 ASEA electric motors
- Speed: 16 knots (30 km/h; 18 mph) surfaced; 20 knots (37 km/h; 23 mph) submerged
- Complement: 44
- Armament: 4 × 533mm torpedo tubes (8 torpedoes in bow)

HSwMS Hajen (Hj, later Haj; lit. 'shark') was the lead boat of the Hajen-class submarine of the Swedish Navy.

== Construction and career ==
Hajen was launched on 11 December 1954 by Saab Kockums, Malmö and commissioned on 28 February 1957.

She was decommissioned on 1 July 1980 and later scrapped in Landskrona in 1983.

== Gallery ==
HSwMS Hajen

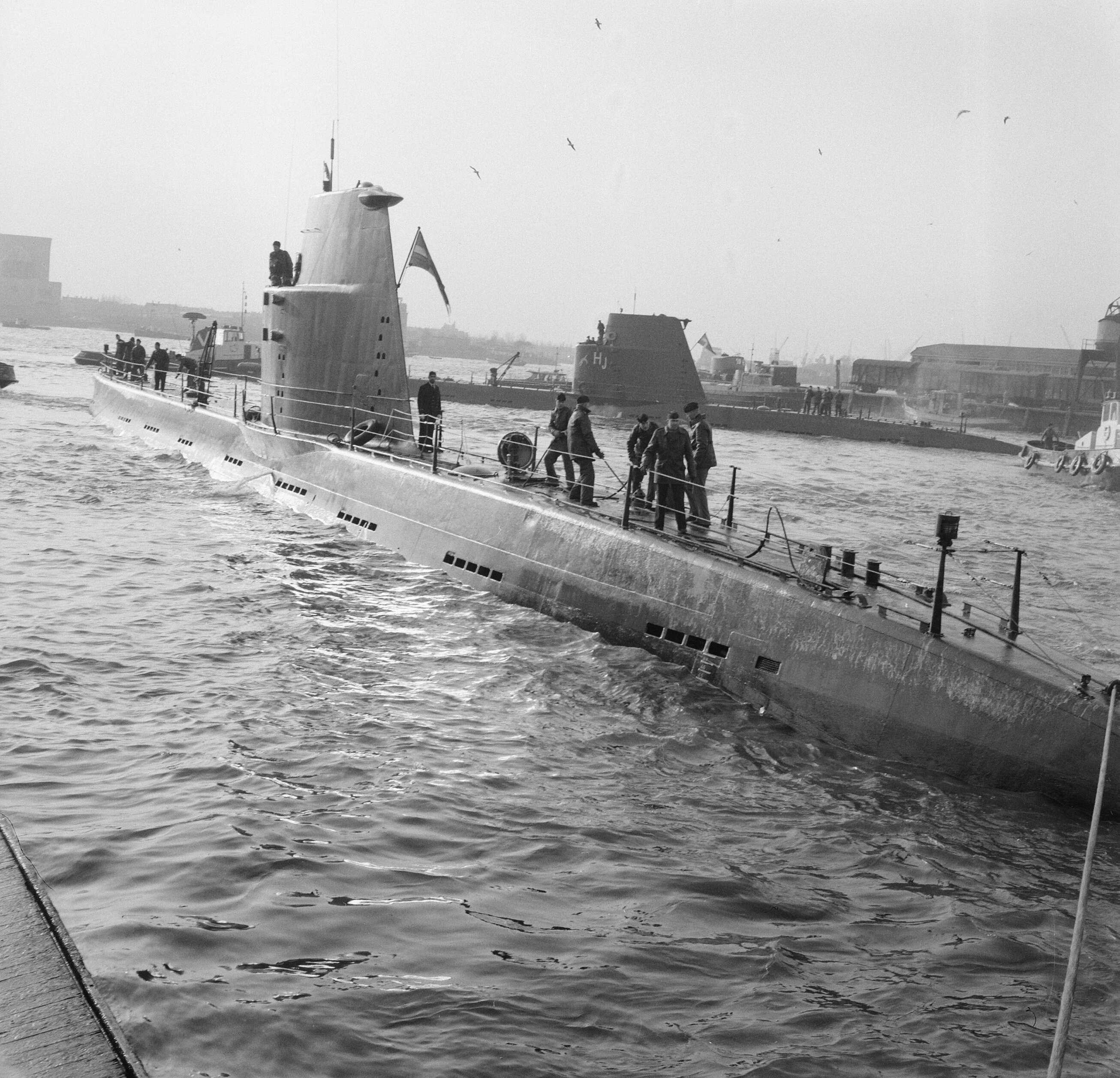
Hajen with Bävern on 25 January 1961

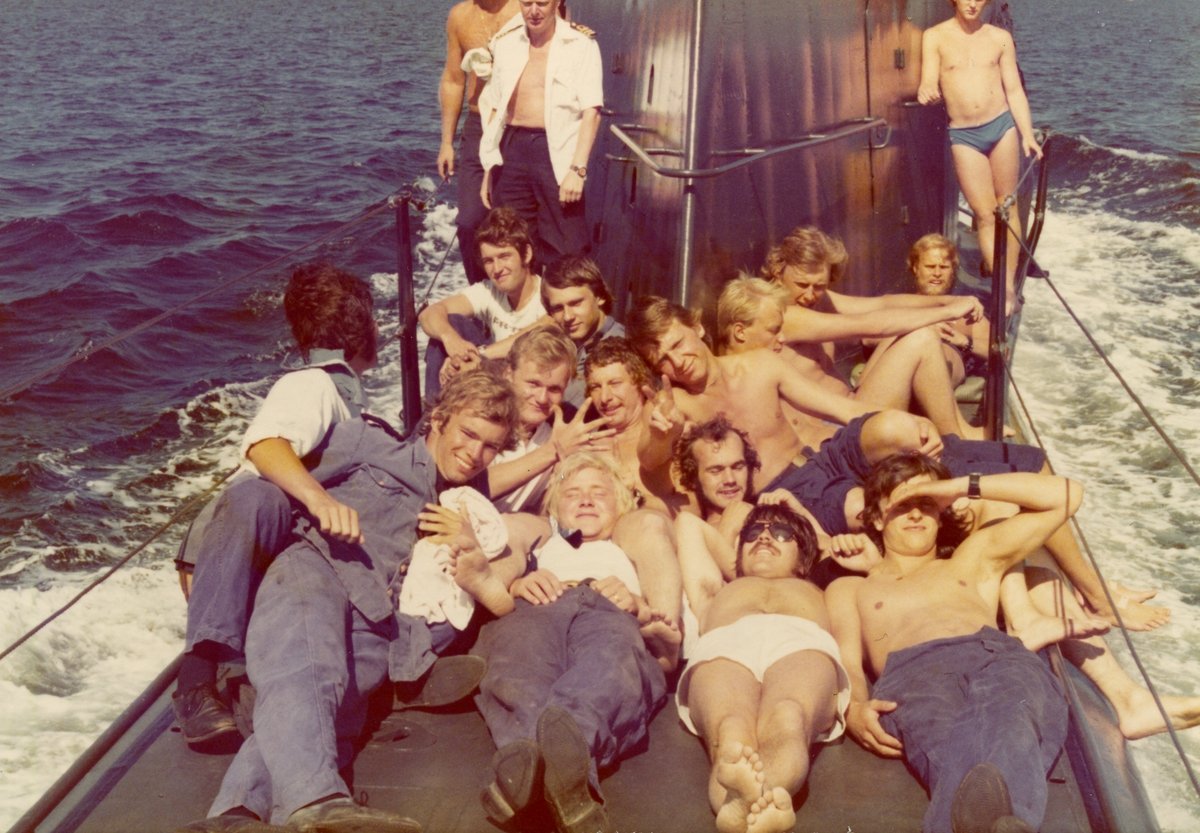
The crew of Hajen in 1975

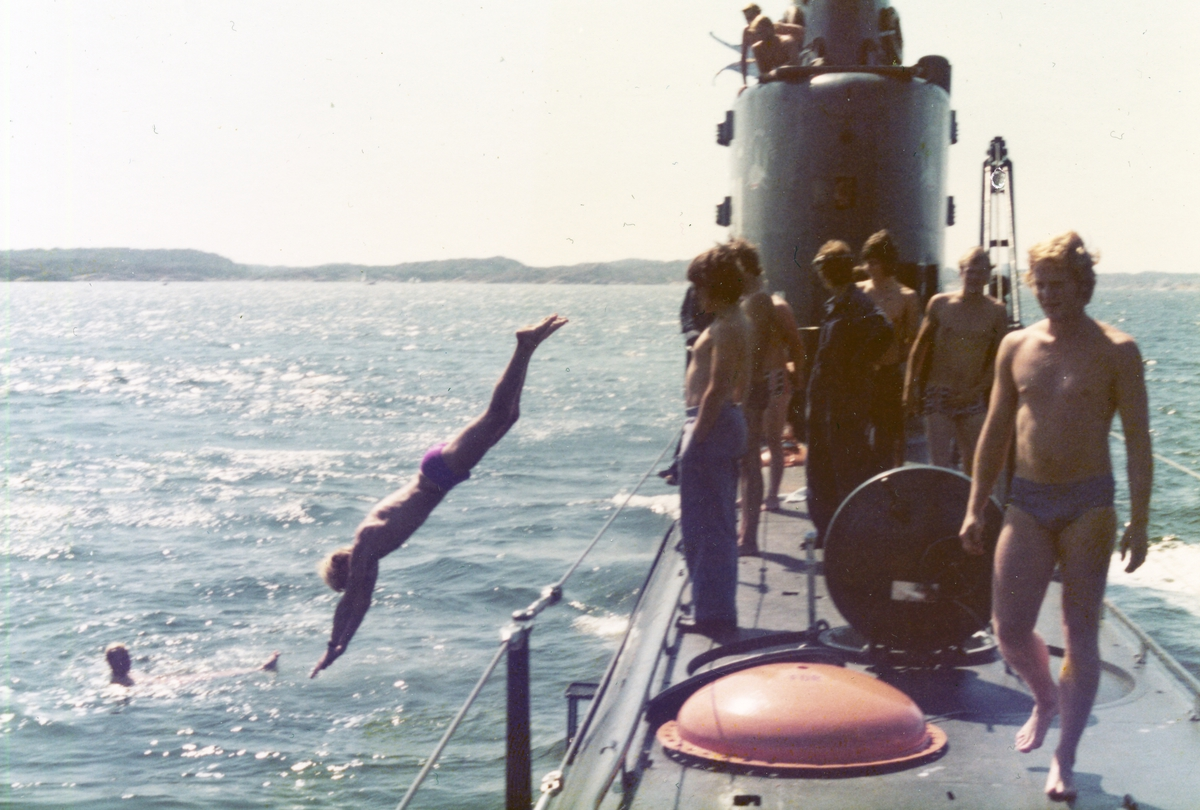

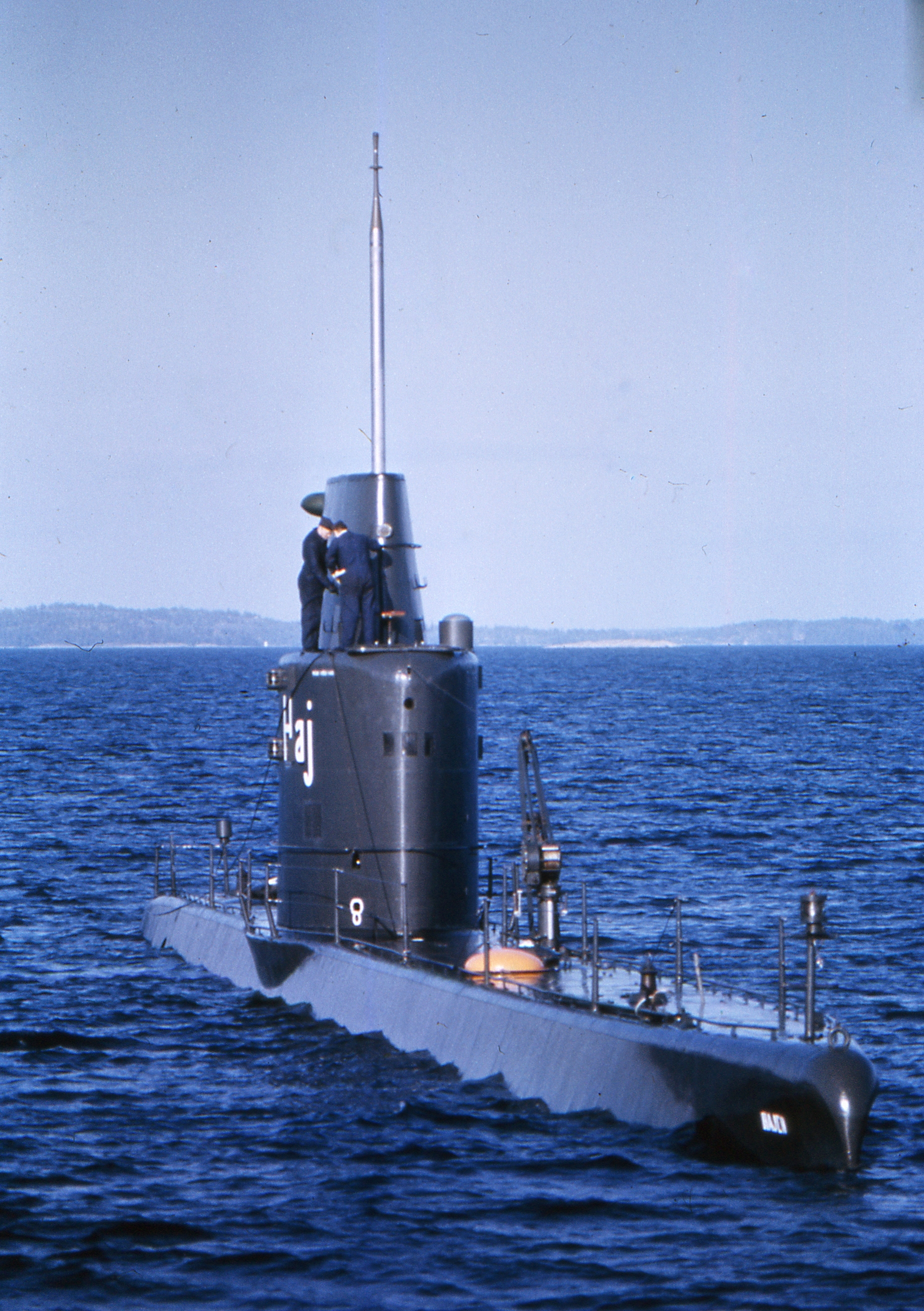
