= HSwMS Bävern (1958) =

Hajen-class submarine of the Swedish Navy

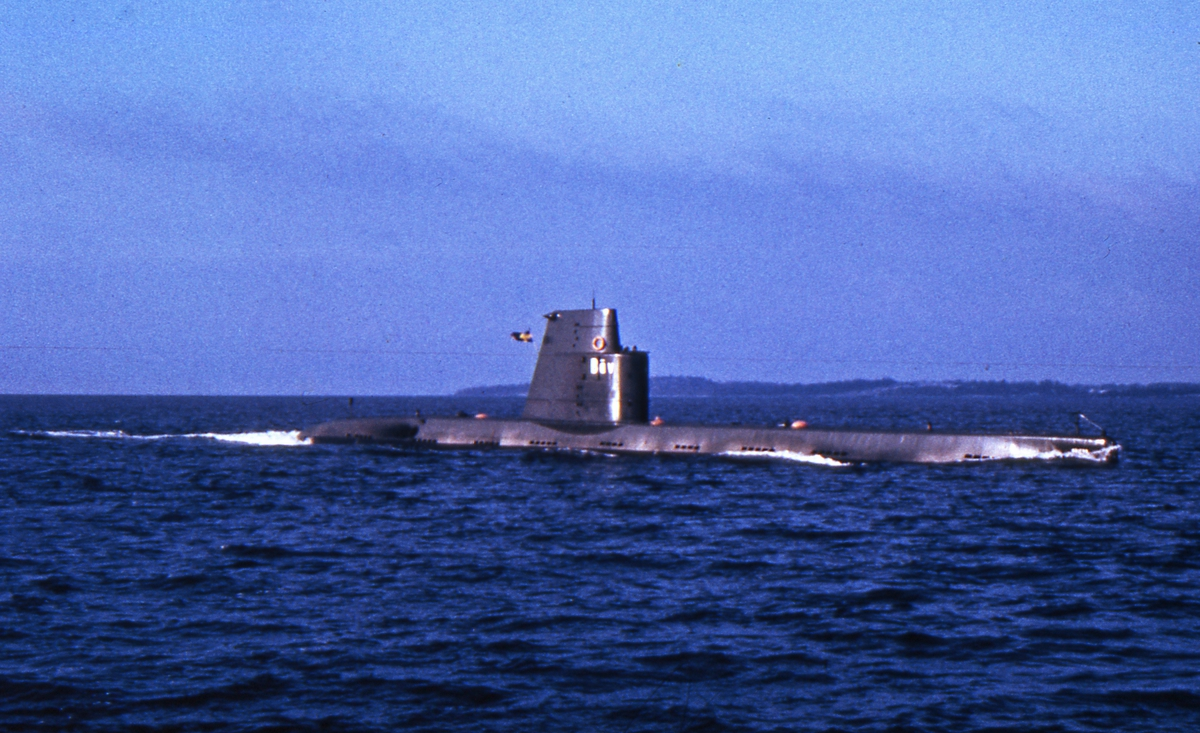
- HSwMS Bävern

History

Sweden
- Name: Bävern
- Namesake: Swedish for beaver
- Builder: Saab Kockums
- Launched: 3 February 1958
- Commissioned: 29 May 1959
- Decommissioned: 1 July 1980
- Identification: Bv; Bäv
- Motto: Semper in viam; (Always on the go)
- Fate: Scrapped, 1981

General characteristics
- Class & type: Hajen-class submarine
- Displacement: 720 t (709 long tons), surfaced; 900 t (886 long tons), submerged)
- Length: 65.8 m (216 ft)
- Beam: 5.1 m (17 ft)
- Draught: 5.0 m (16.4 ft)
- Propulsion: 2 shaft diesel-electric; 2 Pielstick Diesels 1660 hp; 2 ASEA electric motors
- Speed: 16 knots (30 km/h; 18 mph) surfaced; 20 knots (37 km/h; 23 mph) submerged
- Complement: 44
- Armament: 4 × 533mm torpedo tubes (8 torpedoes in bow)

HSwMS Bävern (Bv, later Bäv; lit. 'beaver') was the fifth Hajen-class submarine of the Swedish Navy.

== Construction and career ==
Bävern was launched on 3 February 1958 by Saab Kockums, Karlskrona and commissioned on 29 May 1959.

On 19 August 1961, while in Lysekil, she was involved in a bizarre collision with a Volvo P544 car that rolled downhill onto a pier.

She was decommissioned on 1 July 1980 and later sold for scrap in Odense in 1981.

== Gallery ==
HSwMS Bävern

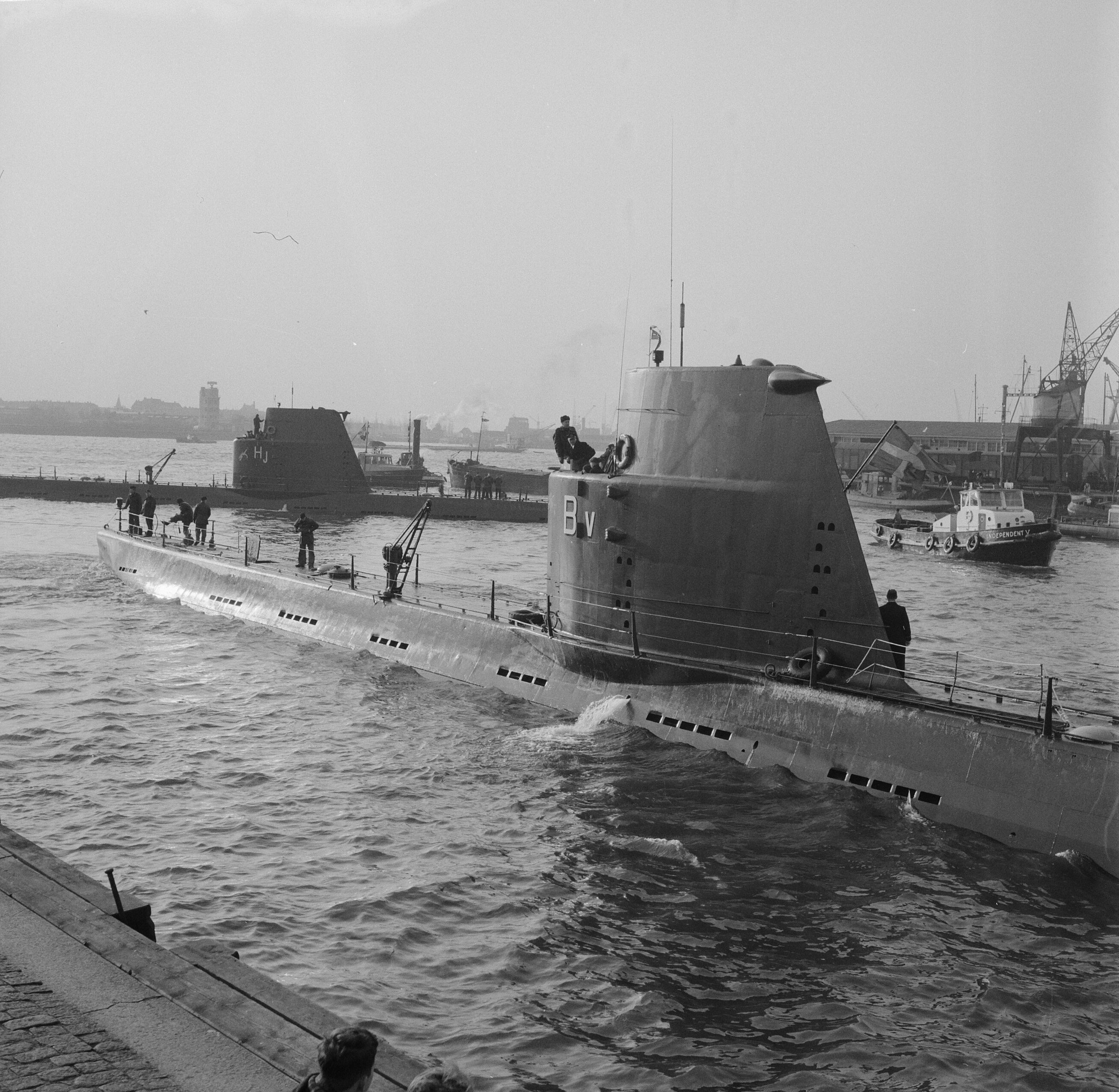
Bävern on 25 January 1961

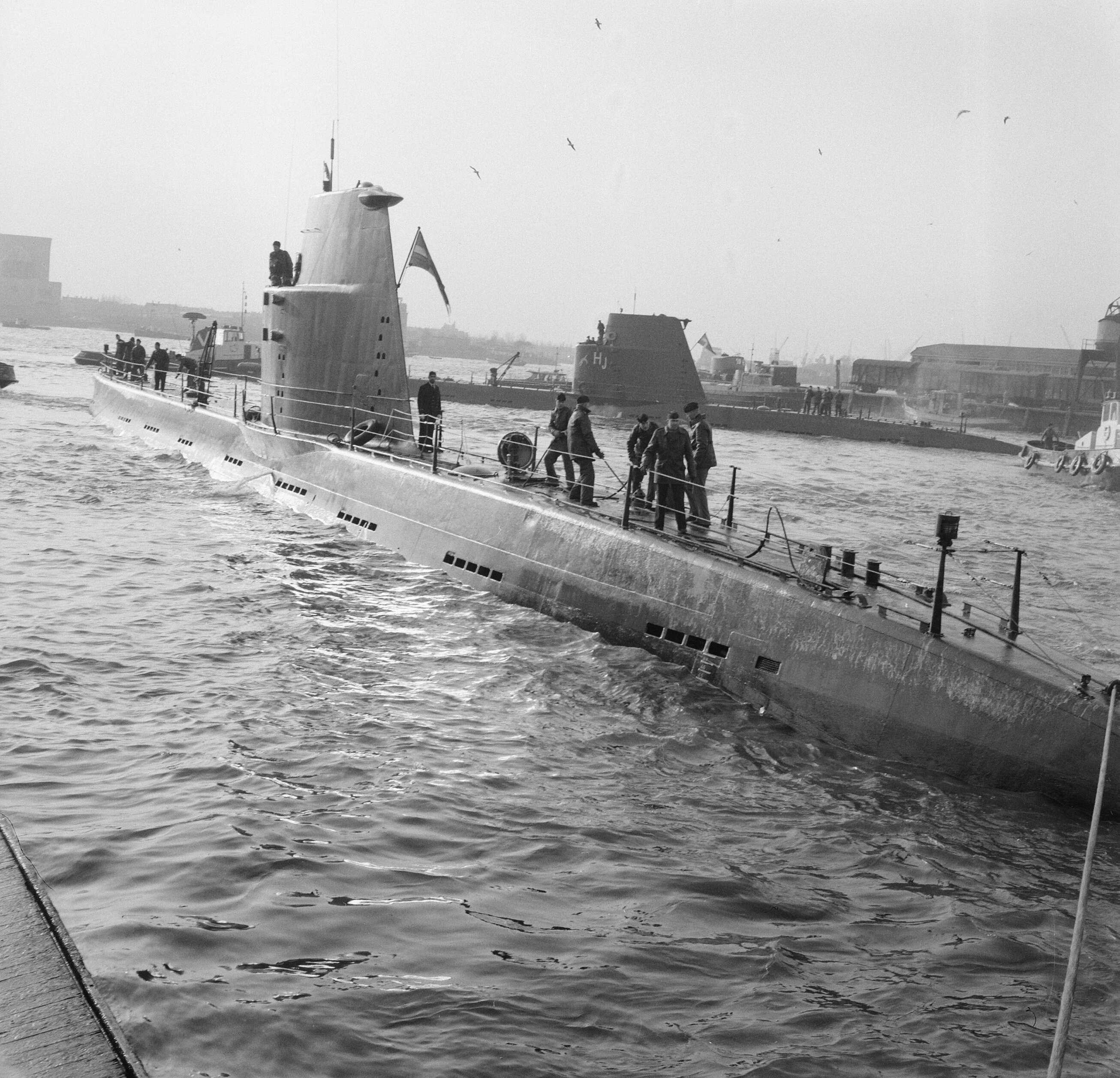
Bävern with Hajen on 25 January 1961

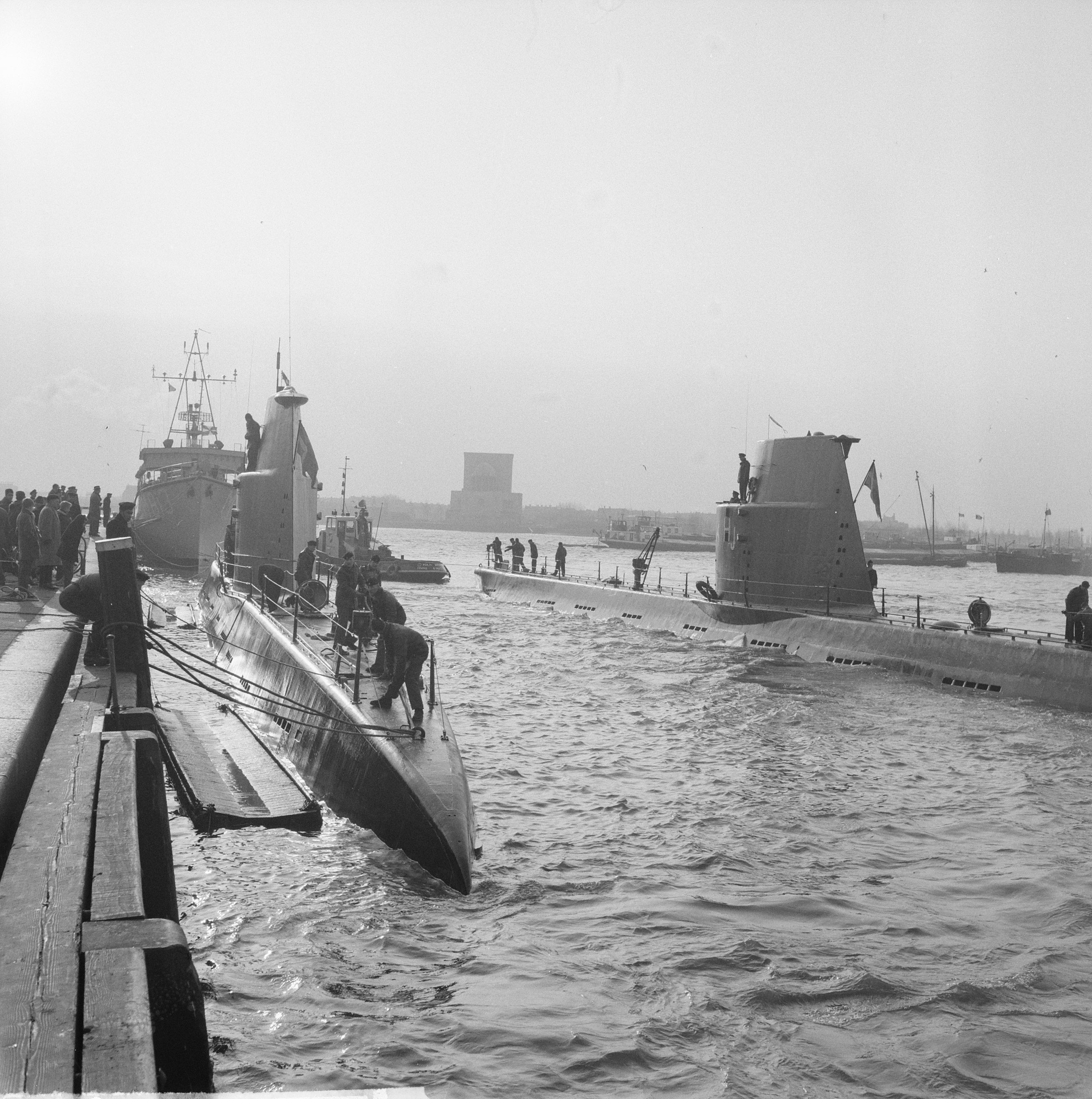

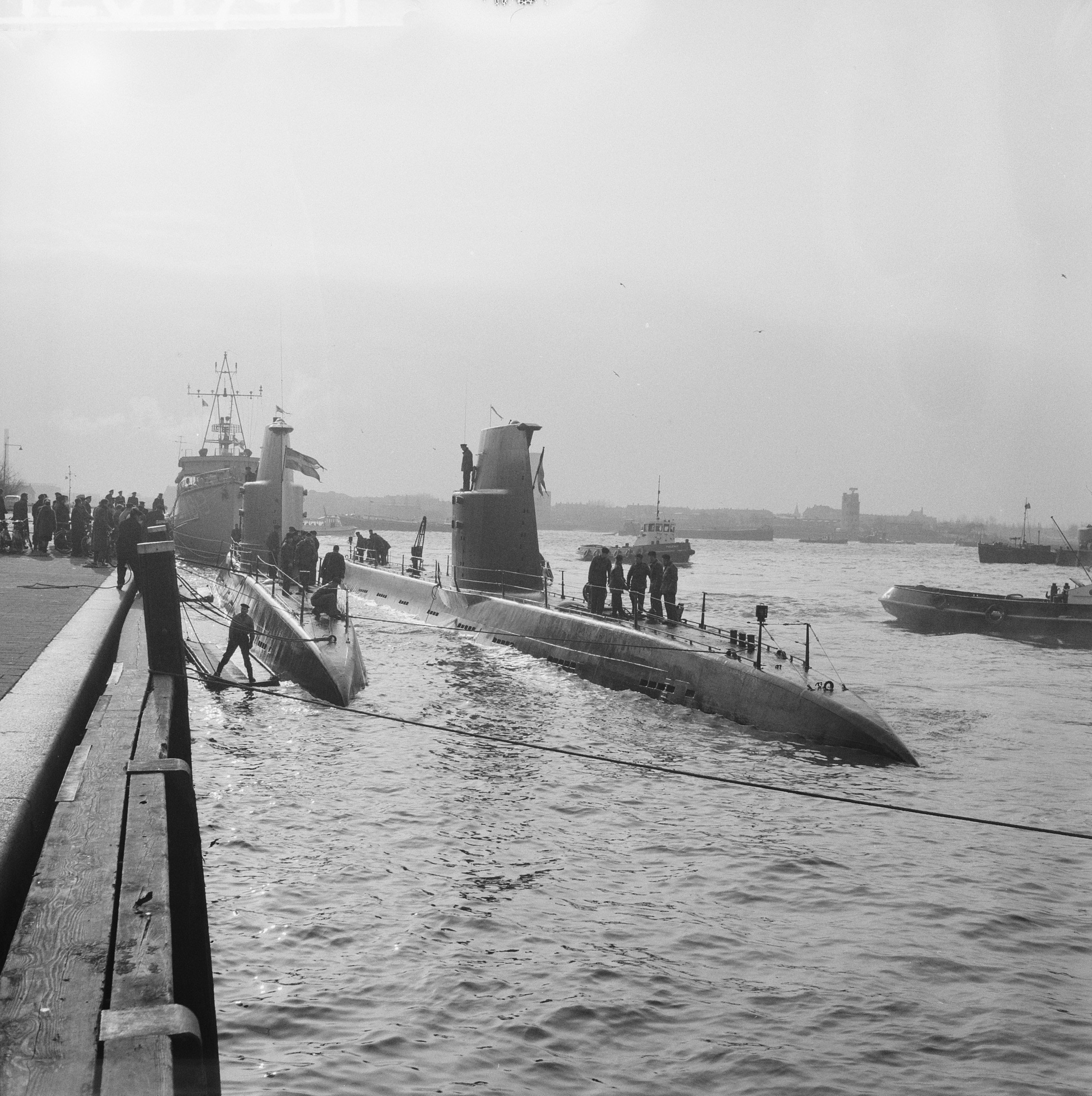

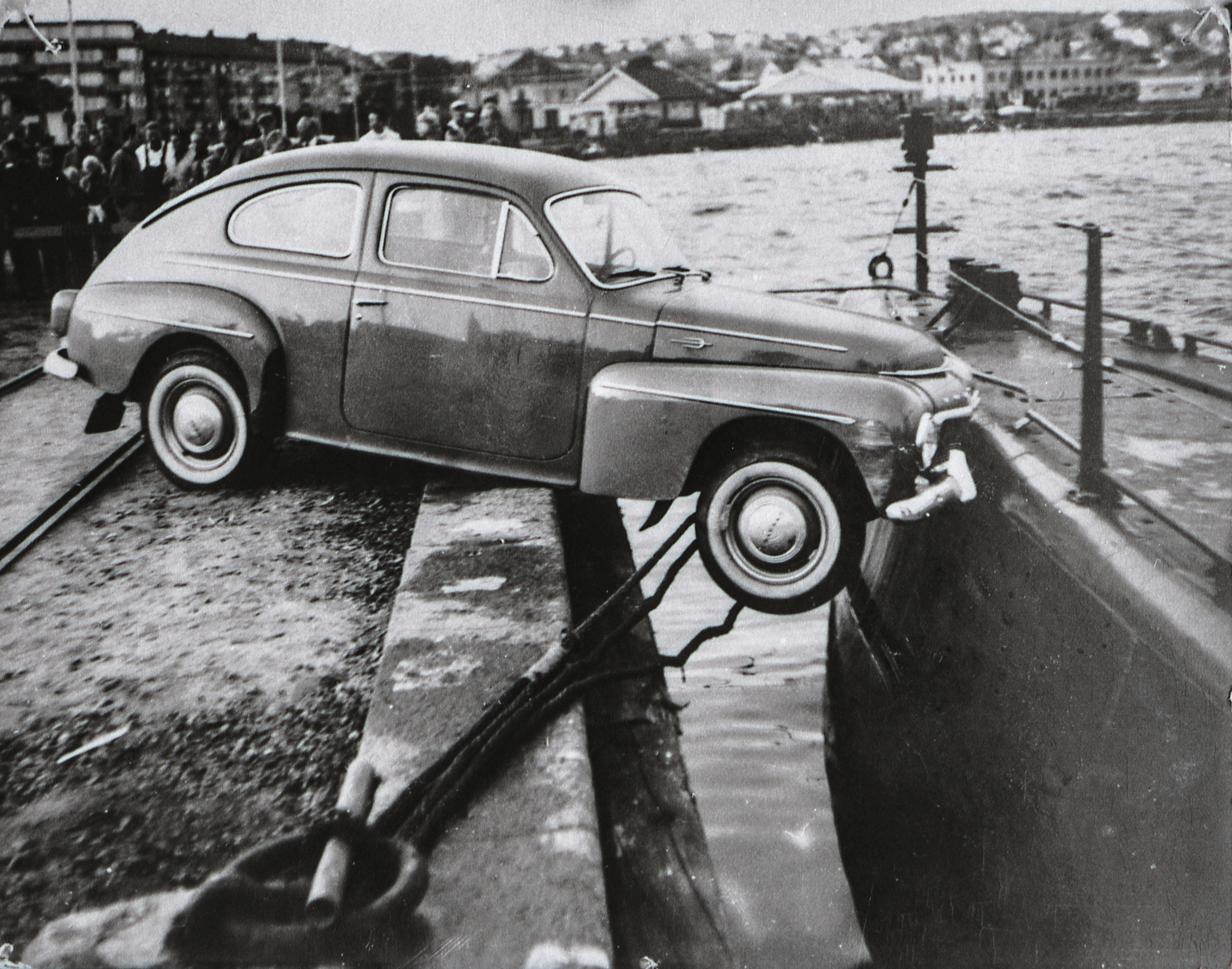
Collision in Lysekil
