= HSwMS Illern (1957) =

Hajen-class submarine of the Swedish Navy

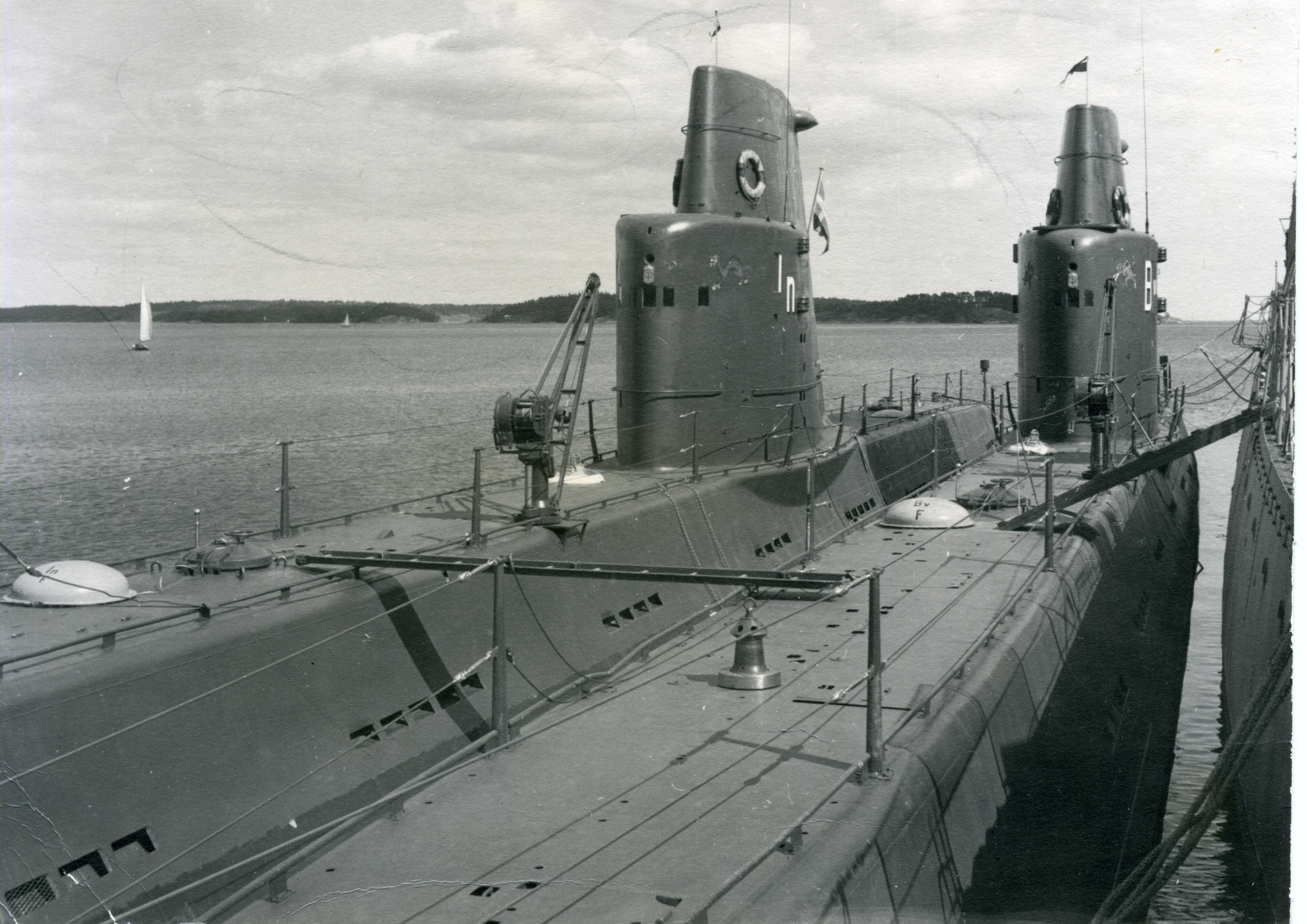
- HSwMS Illern in 1962

History

Sweden
- Name: Illern
- Namesake: Illern
- Builder: Saab Kockums
- Launched: 14 November 1957
- Commissioned: 31 August 1959
- Decommissioned: 1980
- Identification: In; Iln
- Fate: Scrapped, 1981

General characteristics
- Class & type: Hajen-class submarine
- Displacement: 720 t (709 long tons), surfaced; 900 t (886 long tons), submerged)
- Length: 65.8 m (216 ft)
- Beam: 5.1 m (17 ft)
- Draught: 5.0 m (16.4 ft)
- Propulsion: 2 shaft diesel-electric; 2 Pielstick Diesels 1660 hp; 2 ASEA electric motors
- Speed: 16 knots (30 km/h; 18 mph) surfaced; 20 knots (37 km/h; 23 mph) submerged
- Complement: 44
- Armament: 4 × 533mm Torpedo Tubes (bow, 8 torpedoes)

HSwMS Illern (In), (Swedish for "The polecat") was the fourth Hajen-class submarine of the Swedish Navy.

== Construction and career ==
HSwMS Illern was launched on 14 November 1957 by Saab Kockums, Karlskrona and commissioned on 31 August 1959.

She was decommissioned in 1980 and later sold for scrap in Odense in 1981.

== Gallery ==
HSwMS Illern

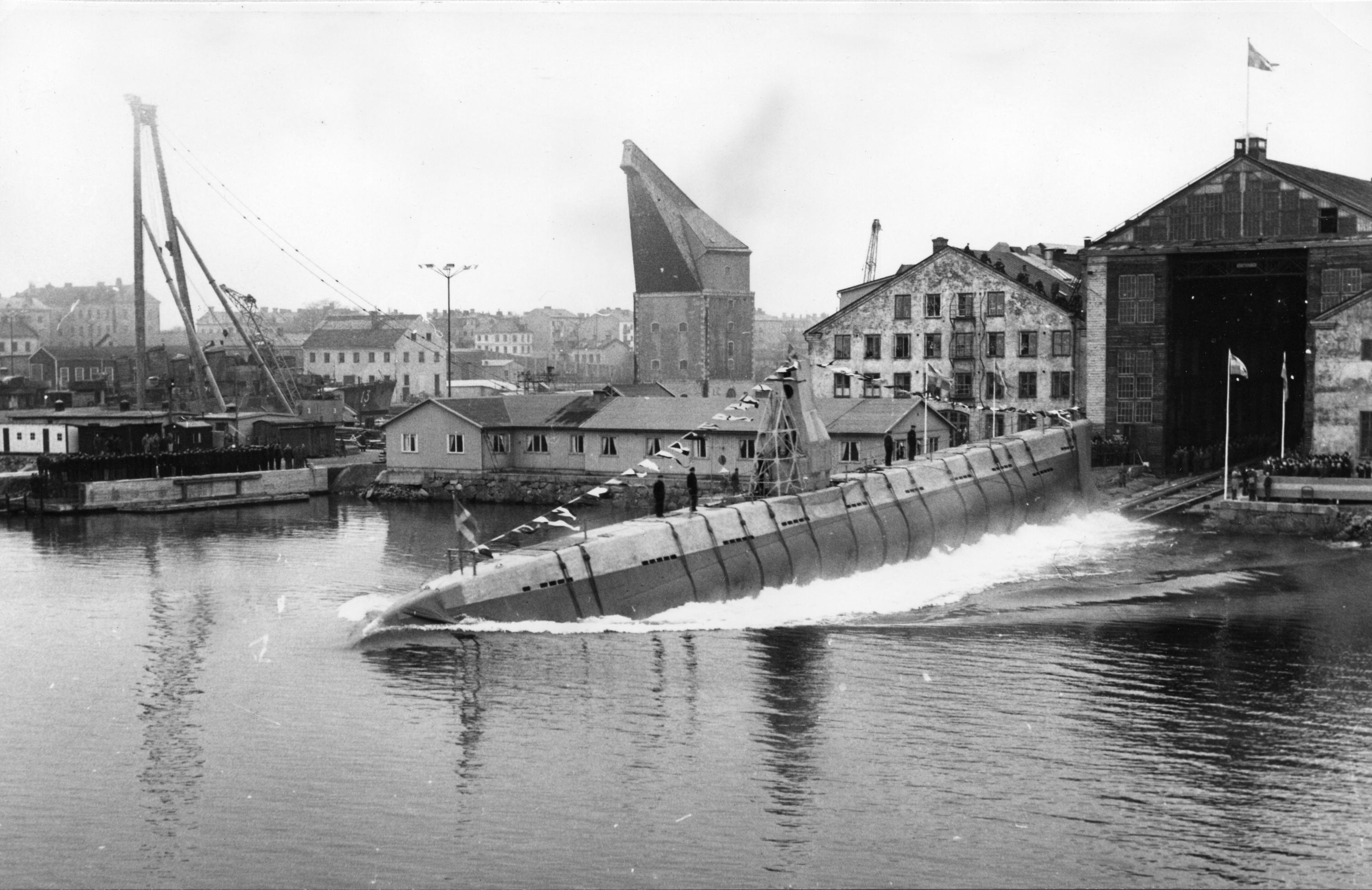
HSwMS Illern on 14 November 1957

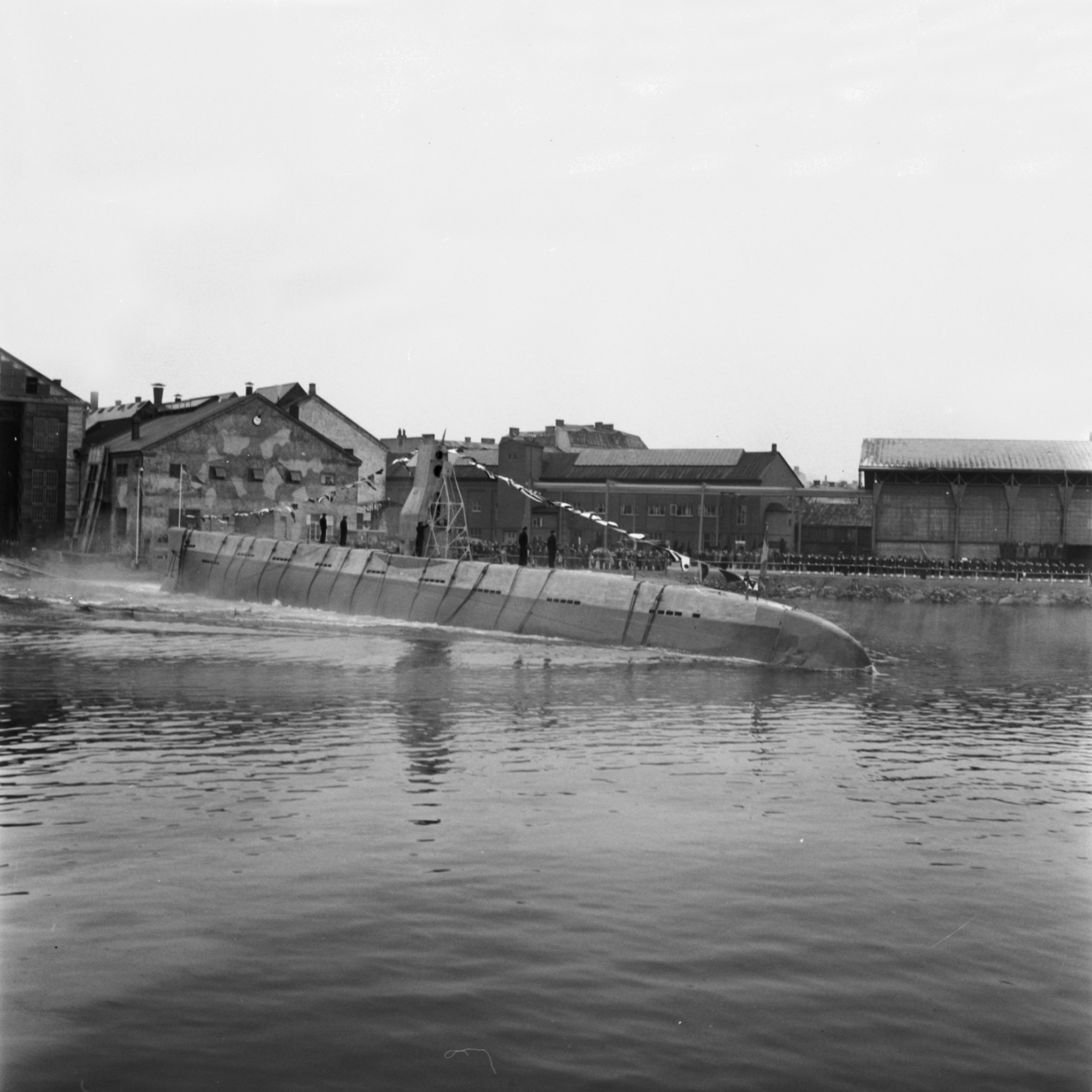

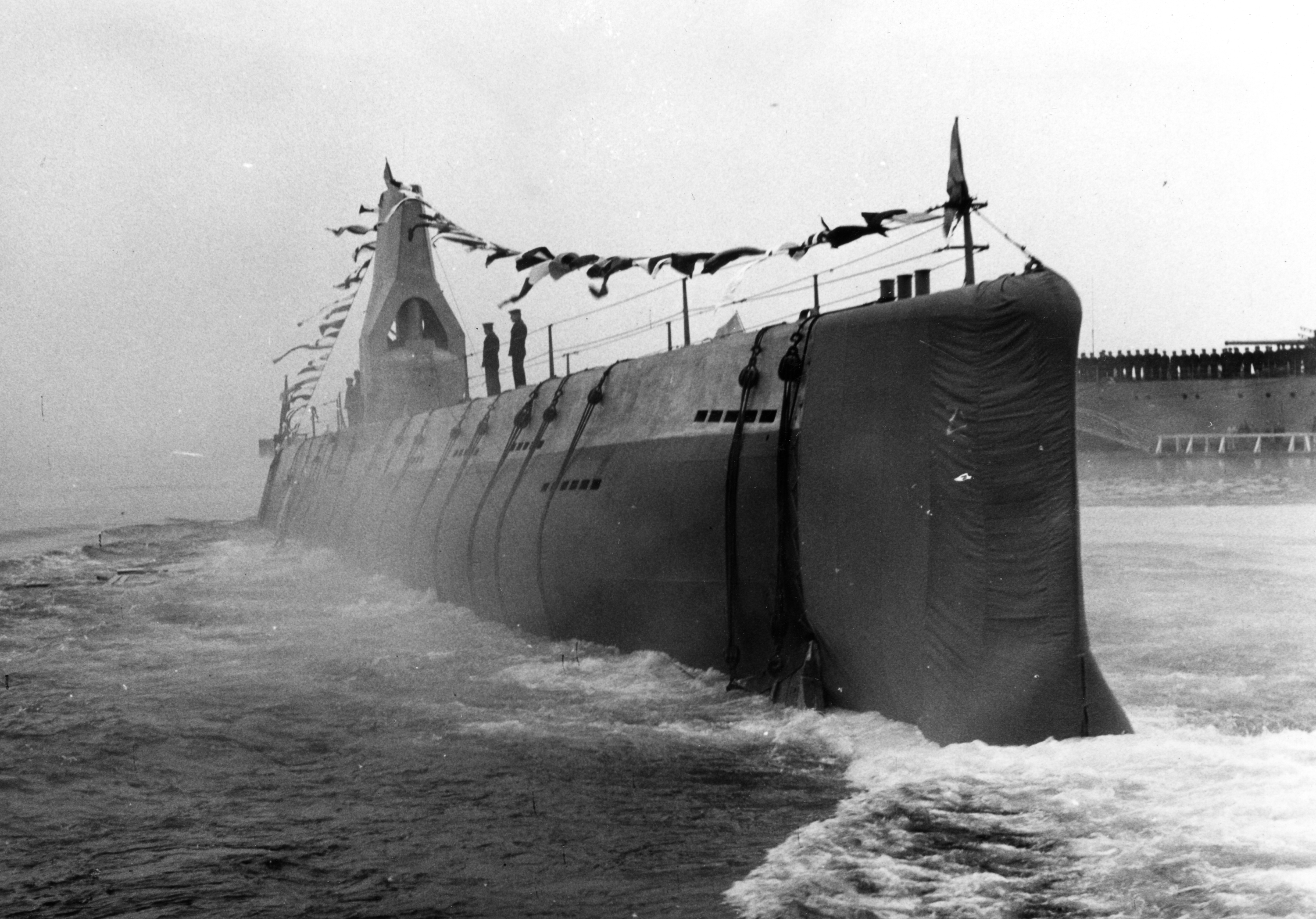

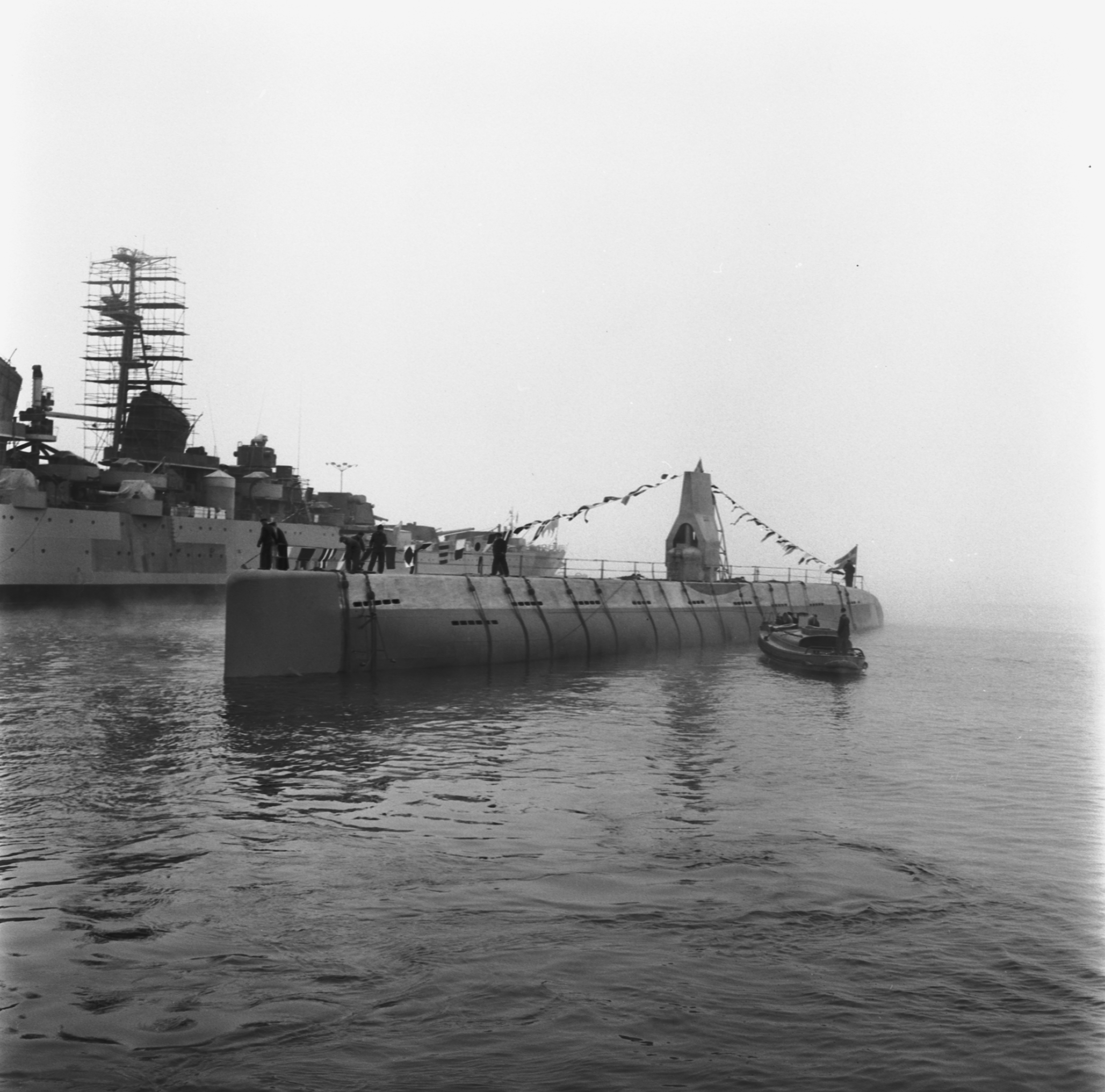
