= Hajen-class submarine (1917) =

Swedish submarine class

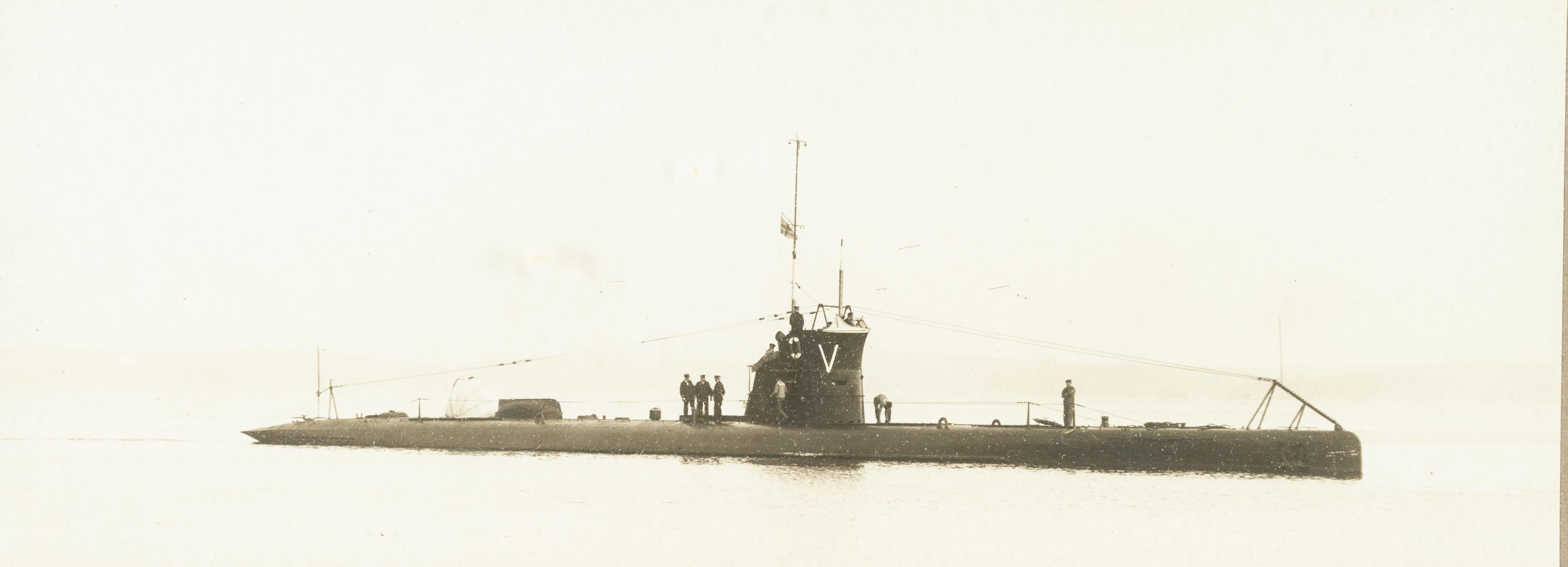
- HSwMS Valrossen in 1918

Class overview
- Name: Hajen class
- Builders: Kockums, Malmö
- Operators: Swedish Navy
- Succeeded by: Bävern class
- In service: 1917–1943
- Completed: 3
- Scrapped: 3

General characteristics
- Displacement: Surfaced: 422 tons; Submerged: 600 tons
- Length: 54.00 m (177 ft 2 in)
- Beam: 5.21 m (17 ft 1 in)
- Draft: 3.51 m (11 ft 6 in)
- Speed: Surfaced: 15.5 knots (28.7 km/h; 17.8 mph); Submerged: 9 knots (17 km/h; 10 mph)
- Complement: 30
- Armament: 4 × 457 mm (18.0 in) torpedo tubes; 1 × 75 mm (3.0 in) deck gun

The Hajen class, also known as the Hajen II class, was a trio of submarines operated by the Swedish Navy between 1917 and 1943. The design was based on the German Type UB-III U-boat and modified for Swedish service. The boats had an uneventful history throughout the interwar period were retired during World War II.

== Development and design ==
During World War I, Sweden primarily relied on the Swedish Navy to enforce the nation's neutrality. The Riksdag invested in the fleet during the war, including submarines. Swedish doctrine viewed submarines as a cheap method to counter enemy capital ships, although the Navy often wanted more boats. In the middle of the war, Swedish naval officials were impressed by the performance of German U-boats. As a result, Kockums bought a license to the Type UB-III U-boat from AG Weser. Kockums modified the design by removing the rear torpedo tube and shortened the hull before it was offered to the Navy, who ordered three boats.

The design featured a length of 54.00 metres (177 ft 2 in), beam of 5.21 metres (17 ft 1 in), and a draught of 3.51 metres (11 ft 6 in), and a complement of 30. Armament consisted of four 457 mm (18.0 in) torpedo tubes and a 75 mm (3.0 in) deck gun. The boats were propelled by two 6-cylinder diesel engines and two electric motors which produced 2,000 brake horsepower (1,500 kW) and 700 horsepower (520 kW) through two propellers. While surfaced, the boats had a maximum speed of 15.5 knots (28.7 km/h; 17.8 mph) and displaced 422 tons and had a speed of 9 knots (17 km/h; 10 mph) and displaced 600 tons while submerged. In 1921, the vessels was followed up by the three Bävern-class submarines, which was slightly longer and featured an improved design.

After entering service by 1918, the boats operated throughout the interwar period and most of World War II, and were all decommissioned by 1943.

== Ships in class ==
Data
Name	Launched	Stricken	Broken up
Hajen	8 November 1917	19 March 1943	1944
Sälen	31 January 1918	24 July 1942	1946
Valrossen	16 April 1918	19 March 1943	1944
