= HSwMS Valen (1955) =

Hajen-class submarine of the Swedish Navy

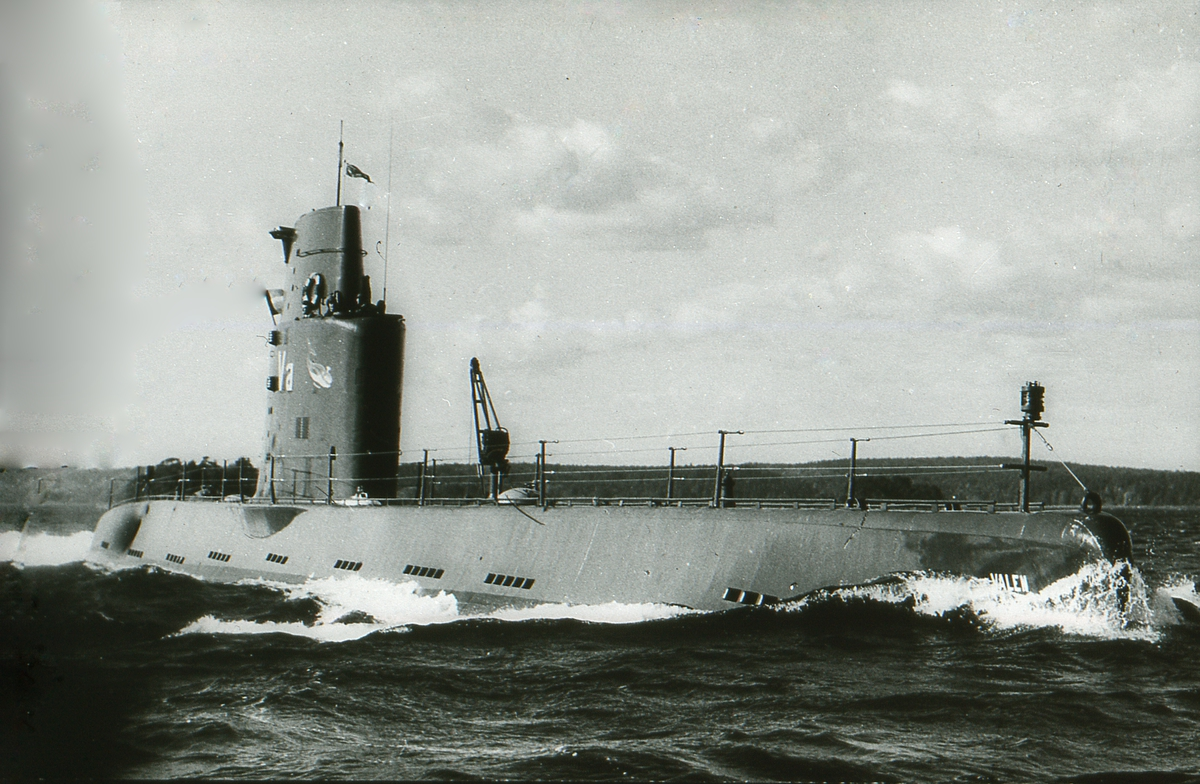
- HSwMS Valen

History

Sweden
- Name: Valen
- Namesake: Valen
- Builder: Karlskronavarvet
- Launched: 21 April 1955
- Commissioned: 4 March 1957
- Decommissioned: 1 July 1980
- Identification: Va; Val
- Motto: Fortiter rem ago; (Forward with force)
- Fate: Sold to West Germany, 1984

General characteristics
- Class & type: Hajen-class submarine
- Displacement: 720 t (709 long tons), surfaced; 900 t (886 long tons), submerged)
- Length: 65.8 m (216 ft)
- Beam: 5.1 m (17 ft)
- Draught: 5.0 m (16.4 ft)
- Propulsion: 2 shaft diesel-electric; 2 Pielstick Diesels 1660 hp; 2 ASEA electric motors
- Speed: 16 knots (30 km/h; 18 mph) surfaced; 20 knots (37 km/h; 23 mph) submerged
- Complement: 44
- Armament: 4 × 533mm Torpedo Tubes (bow, 8 torpedoes)

HSwMS Valen (Va), (Swedish for "The whale") was the third Hajen-class submarine of the Swedish Navy.

== Construction and career ==
HSwMS Valen was launched on 21 April 1955 by Karlskronavarvet, Karlskrona and commissioned on 4 March 1957.

She was decommissioned on 1 July 1980 and later sold to West Germany for stationary trials in 1984.

== Gallery ==
HSwMS Valen

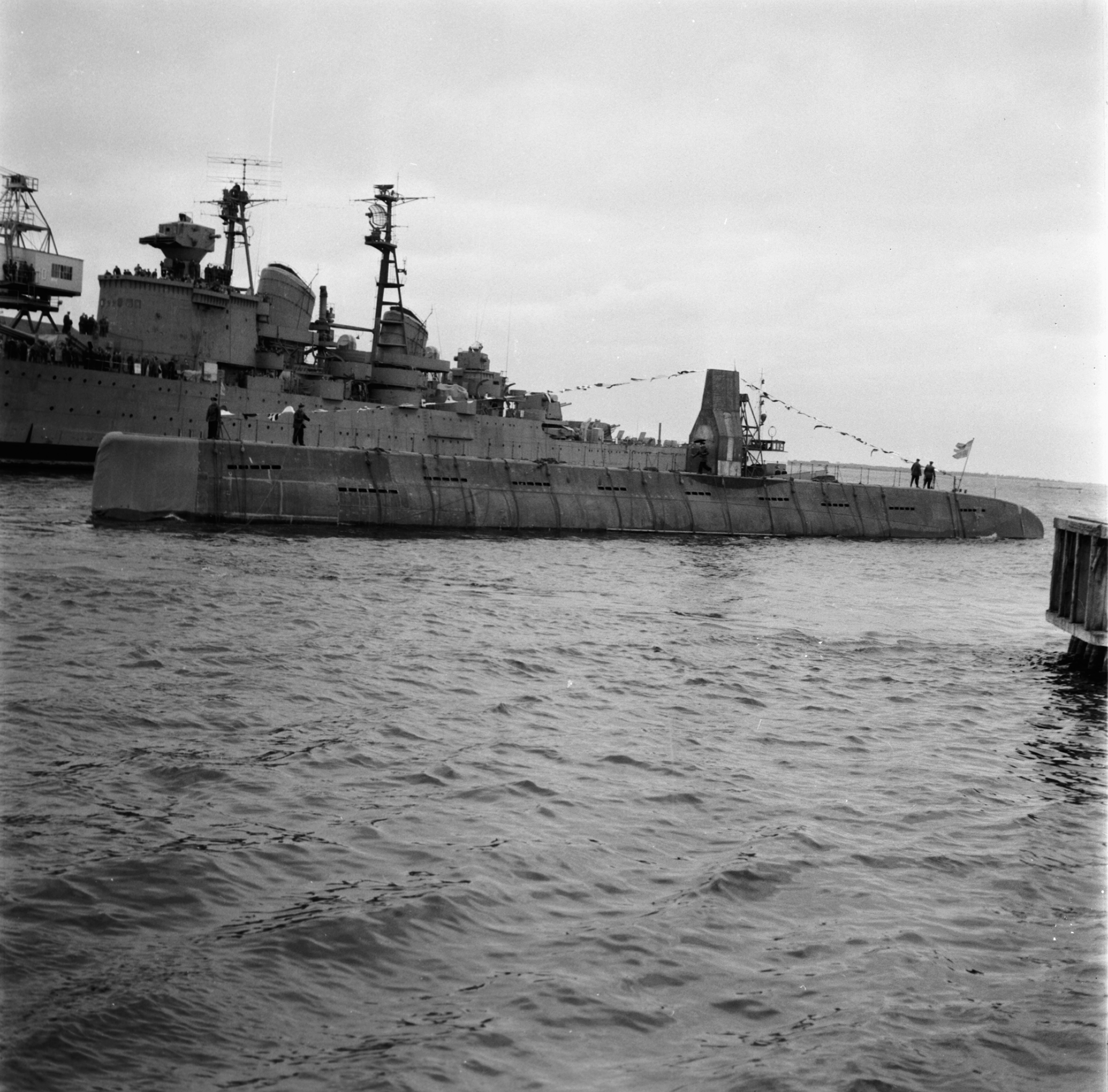
HSwMS Valen on 21 April 1955

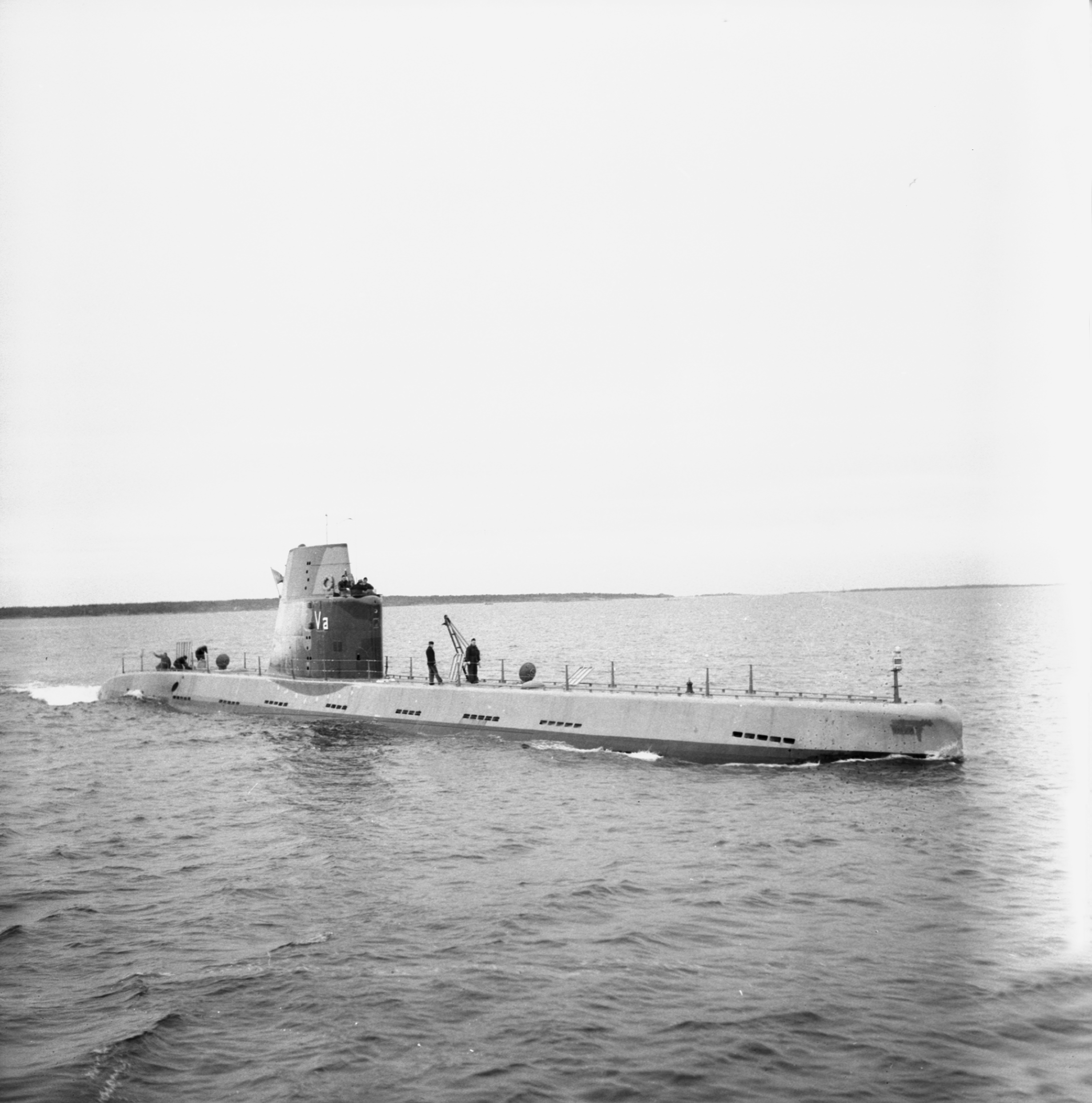
HSwMS Valen in 1956

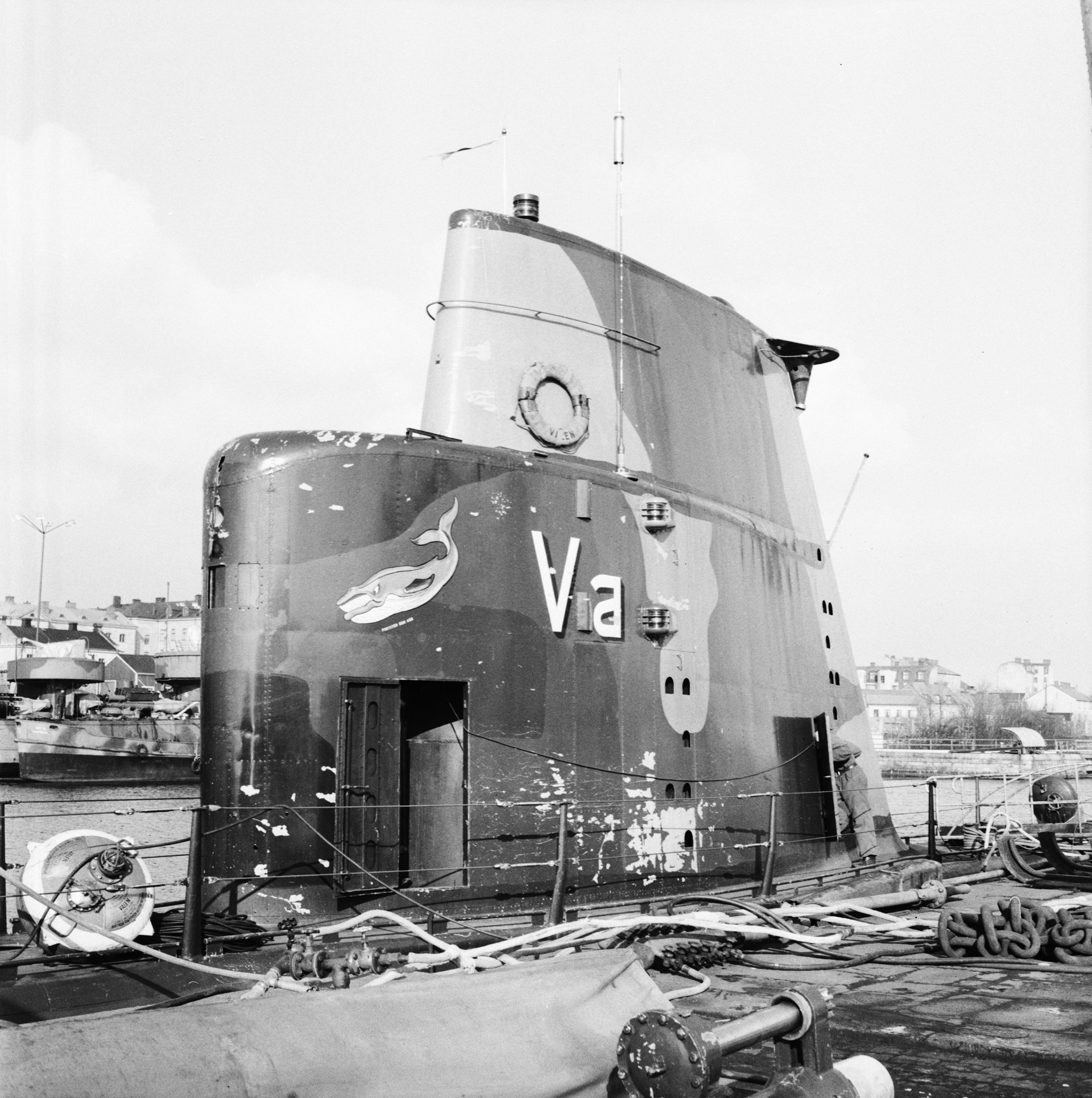
HSwMS Valen on 27 February 1957

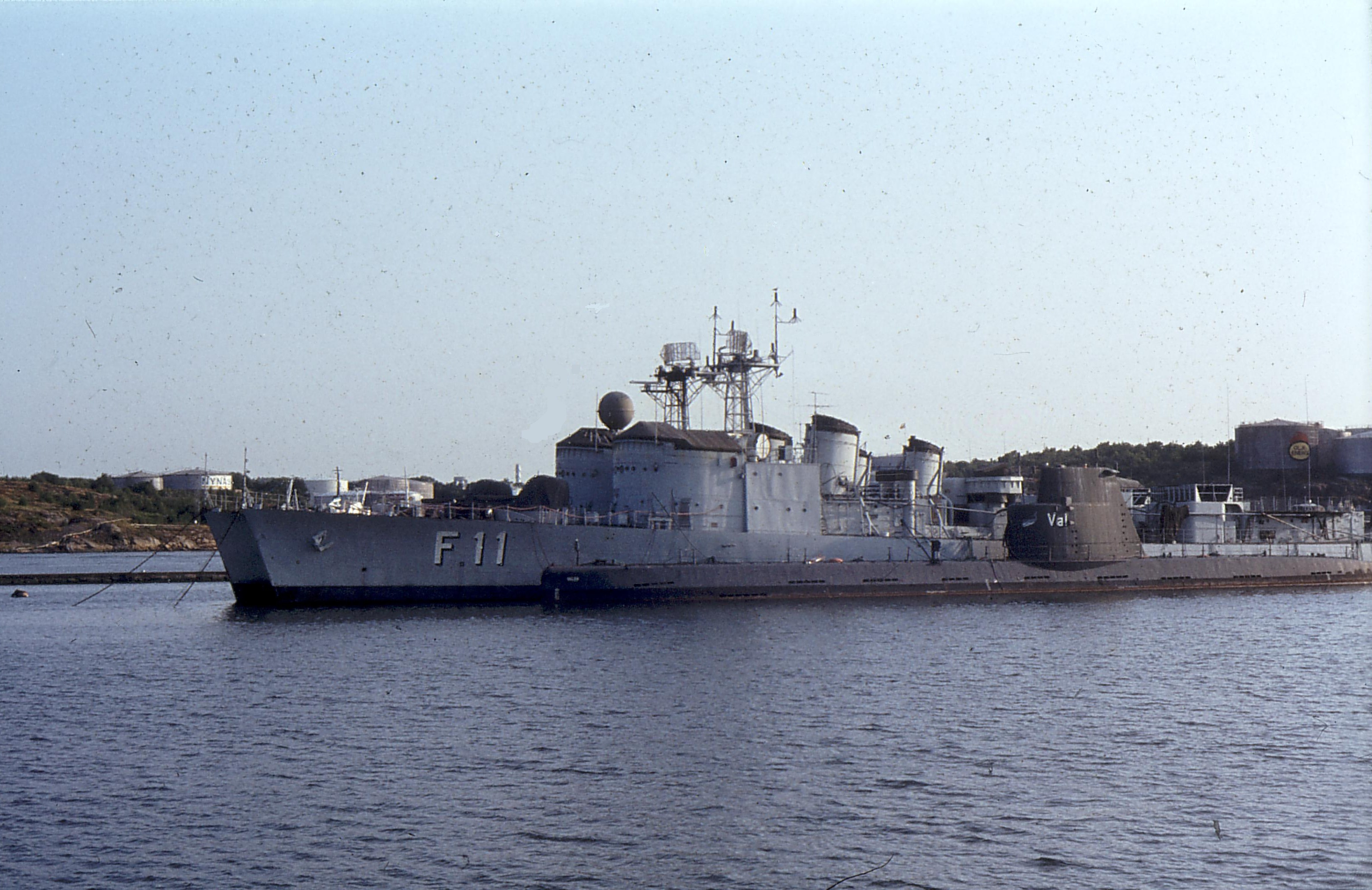
HSwMS Valen in 1982
