= HSwMS Uttern (1958) =

Hajen-class submarine of the Swedish Navy

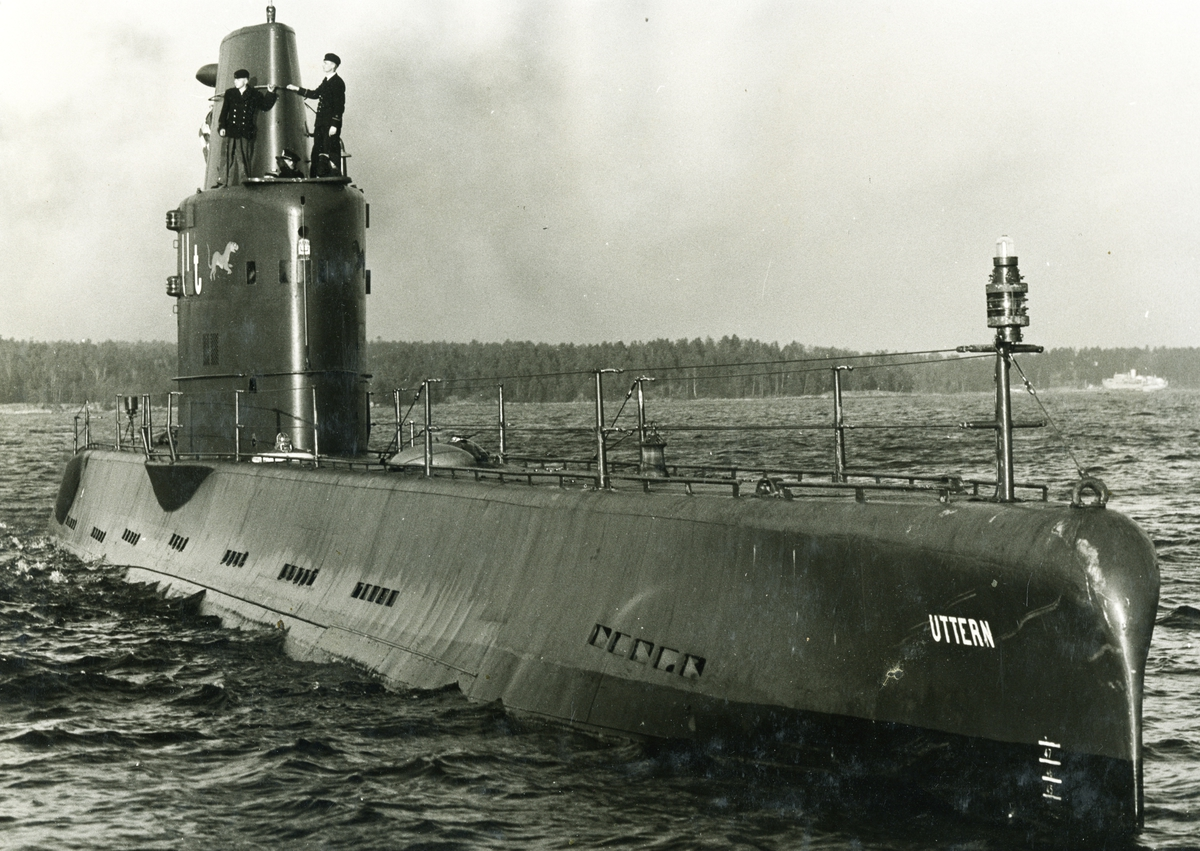
- HSwMS Uttern in 1962

History

Sweden
- Name: Uttern
- Namesake: Uttern
- Builder: Saab Kockums
- Launched: 14 November 1958
- Commissioned: 15 March 1960
- Decommissioned: 1 July 1980
- Identification: Ut; Utn
- Fate: Scrapped, 1981

General characteristics
- Class & type: Hajen-class submarine
- Displacement: 720 t (709 long tons), surfaced; 900 t (886 long tons), submerged)
- Length: 65.8 m (216 ft)
- Beam: 5.1 m (17 ft)
- Draught: 5.0 m (16.4 ft)
- Propulsion: 2 shaft diesel-electric; 2 Pielstick Diesels 1660 hp; 2 ASEA electric motors
- Speed: 16 knots (30 km/h; 18 mph) surfaced; 20 knots (37 km/h; 23 mph) submerged
- Complement: 44
- Armament: 4 × 533mm Torpedo Tubes (bow, 8 torpedoes)

HSwMS Uttern (Ut) (Swedish for "The otter") was the sixth Hajen-class submarine of the Swedish Navy.

== Construction and career ==
HSwMS Uttern was launched on 14 November 1958 by Saab Kockums, Karlskrona and commissioned on 15 March 1960.

She was decommissioned on 1 July 1980 and later sold for scrap in Odense in 1981.

== Gallery ==
HSwMS Uttern

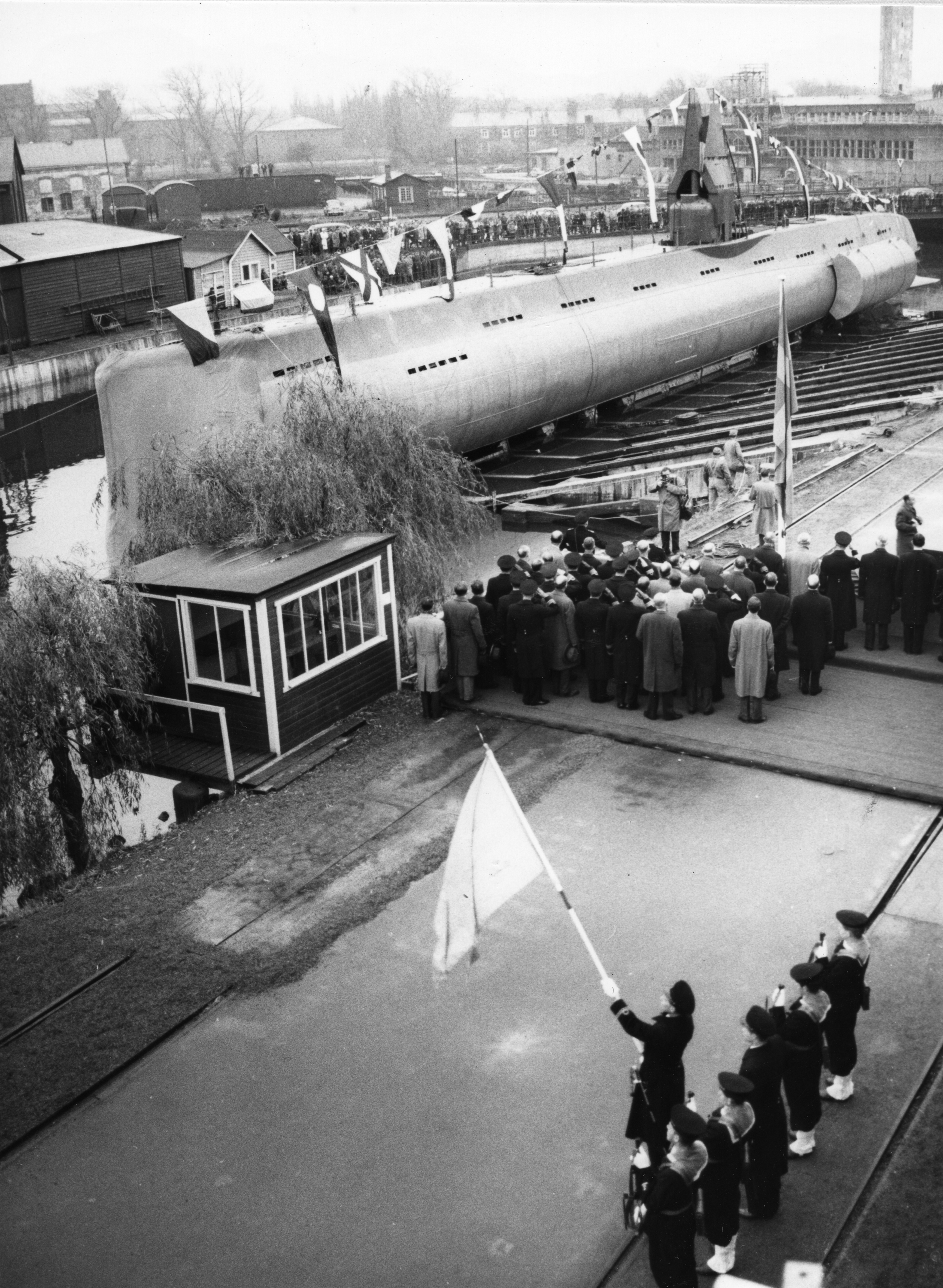
HSwMS Uttern on 14 November 1958

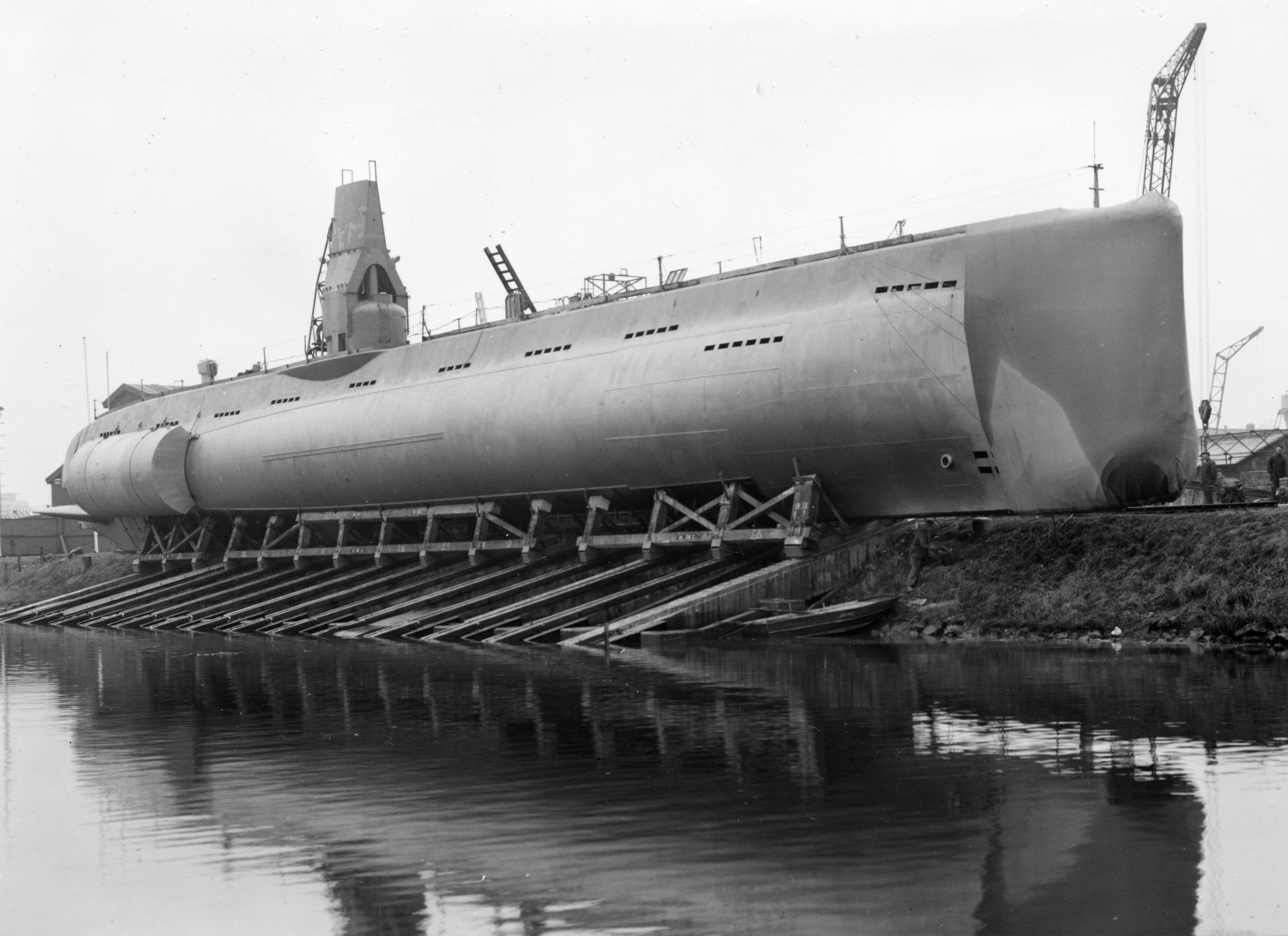

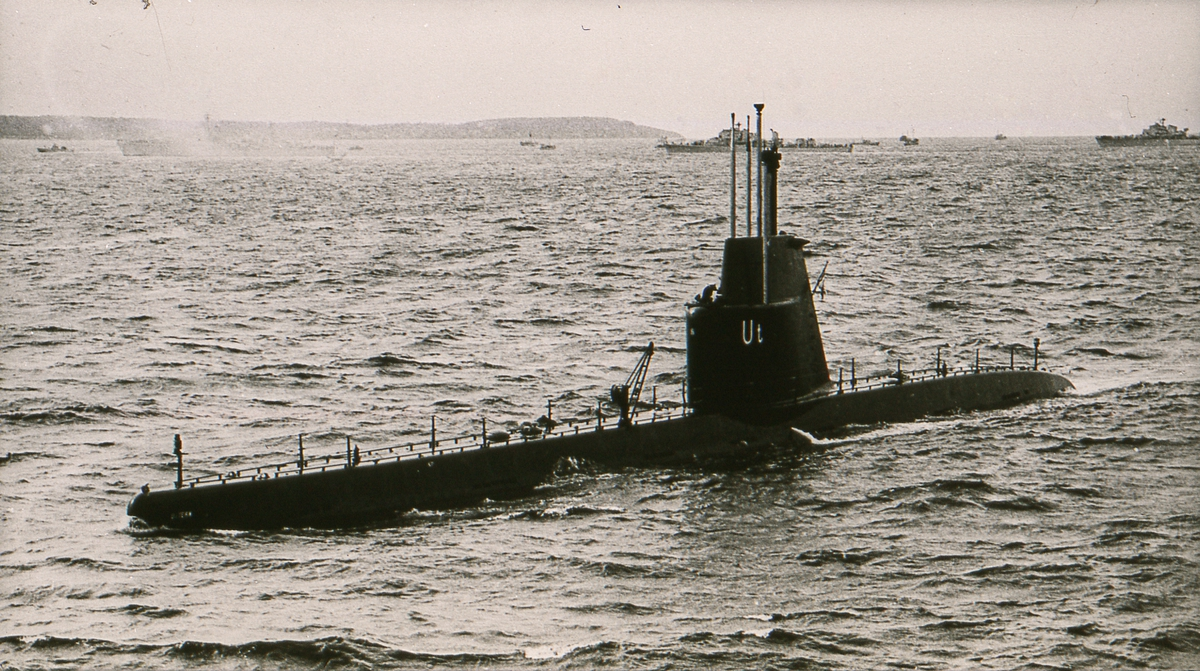
