= HSwMS Sälen (1955) =

Hajen-class submarine of the Swedish Navy

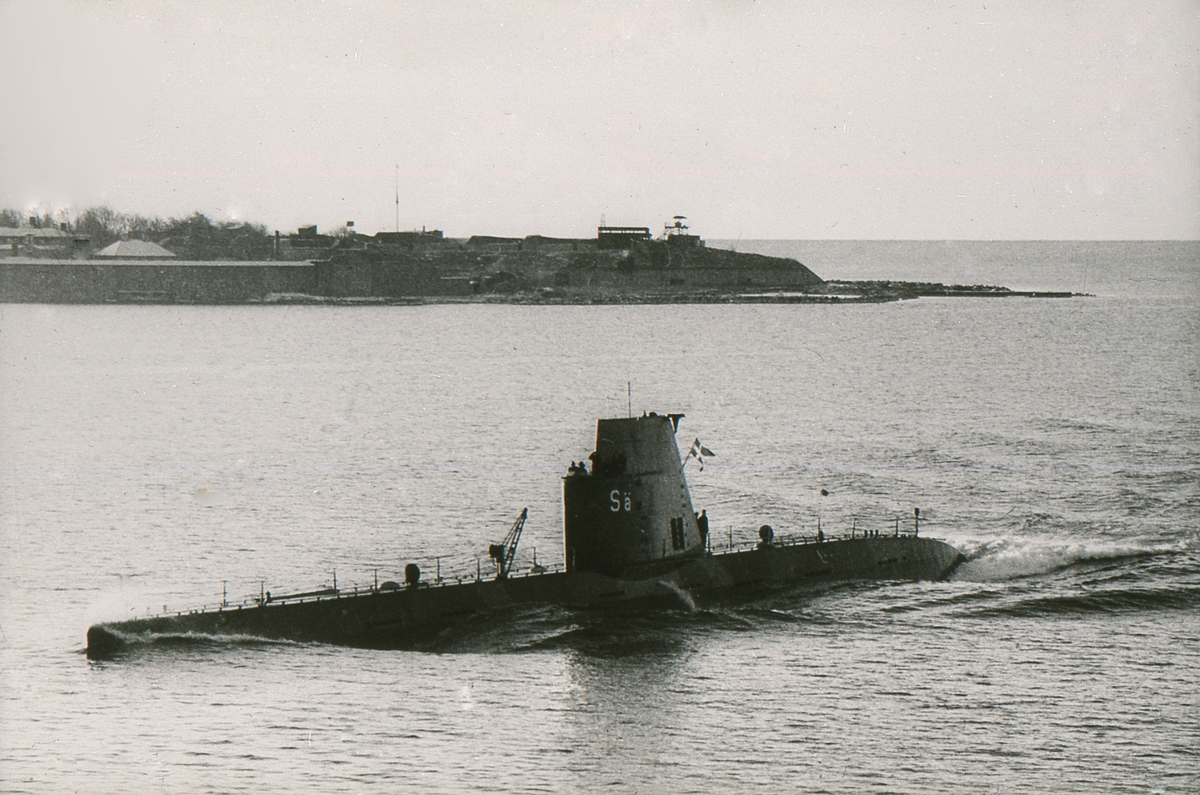
- HSwMS Sälen

History

Sweden
- Name: Sälen
- Namesake: Sälen
- Builder: Saab Kockums
- Laid down: 1953
- Launched: 3 October 1955
- Commissioned: 8 April 1957
- Decommissioned: 1 July 1980
- Identification: Sä; Säl
- Motto: Pulchritudo Alque Robur; (Beauty And Strength)
- Fate: Scrapped, 1990

General characteristics
- Class & type: Hajen-class submarine
- Displacement: 720 t (709 long tons), surfaced; 900 t (886 long tons), submerged)
- Length: 65.8 m (216 ft)
- Beam: 5.1 m (17 ft)
- Draught: 5.0 m (16.4 ft)
- Propulsion: 2 shaft diesel-electric; 2 Pielstick Diesels 1660 hp; 2 ASEA electric motors
- Speed: 16 knots (30 km/h; 18 mph) surfaced; 20 knots (37 km/h; 23 mph) submerged
- Complement: 44
- Armament: 4 × 533mm Torpedo Tubes (bow, 8 torpedoes)

HSwMS Sälen (Sä), (Swedish for "The seal") was the second Hajen-class submarine of the Swedish Navy.

== Construction and career ==
HSwMS Sälen was launched on 3 October 1955 by Saab Kockums, Malmö and commissioned on 8 April 1957.

She was decommissioned on 1 July 1980 and later scrapped in Gävle in 1990.

== Gallery ==
HSwMS Sälen

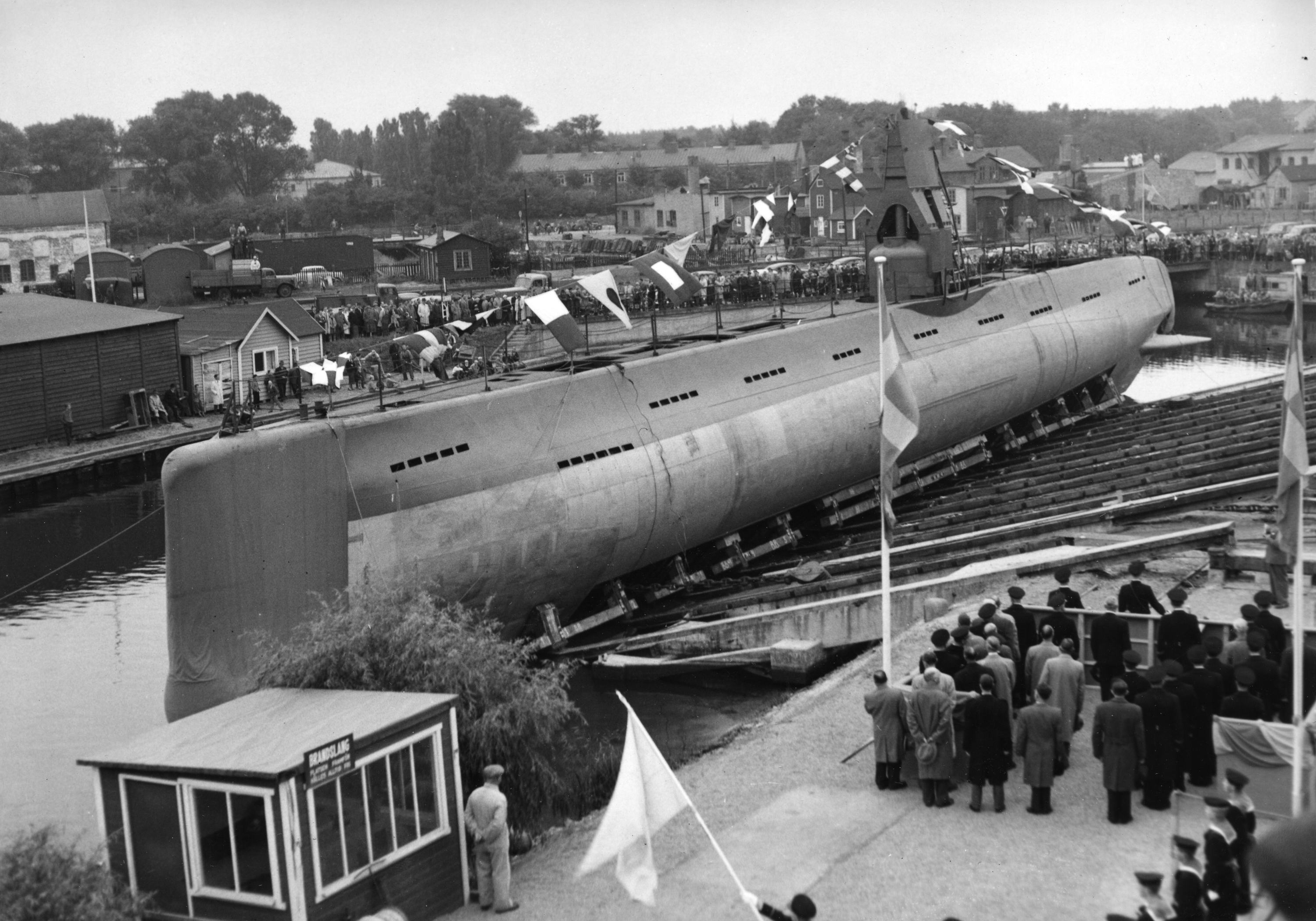
HSwMS Sälen on 3 October 1955

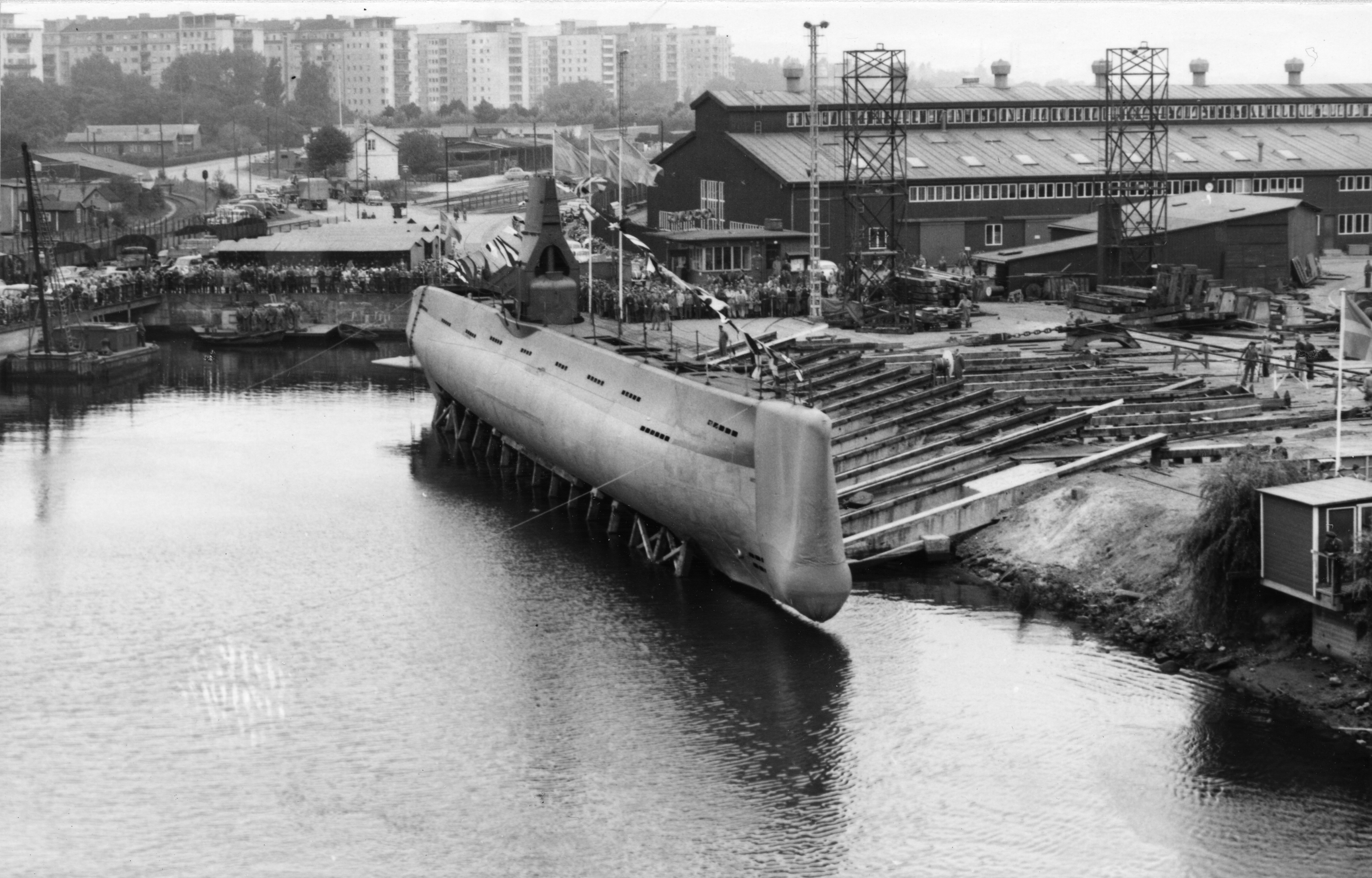

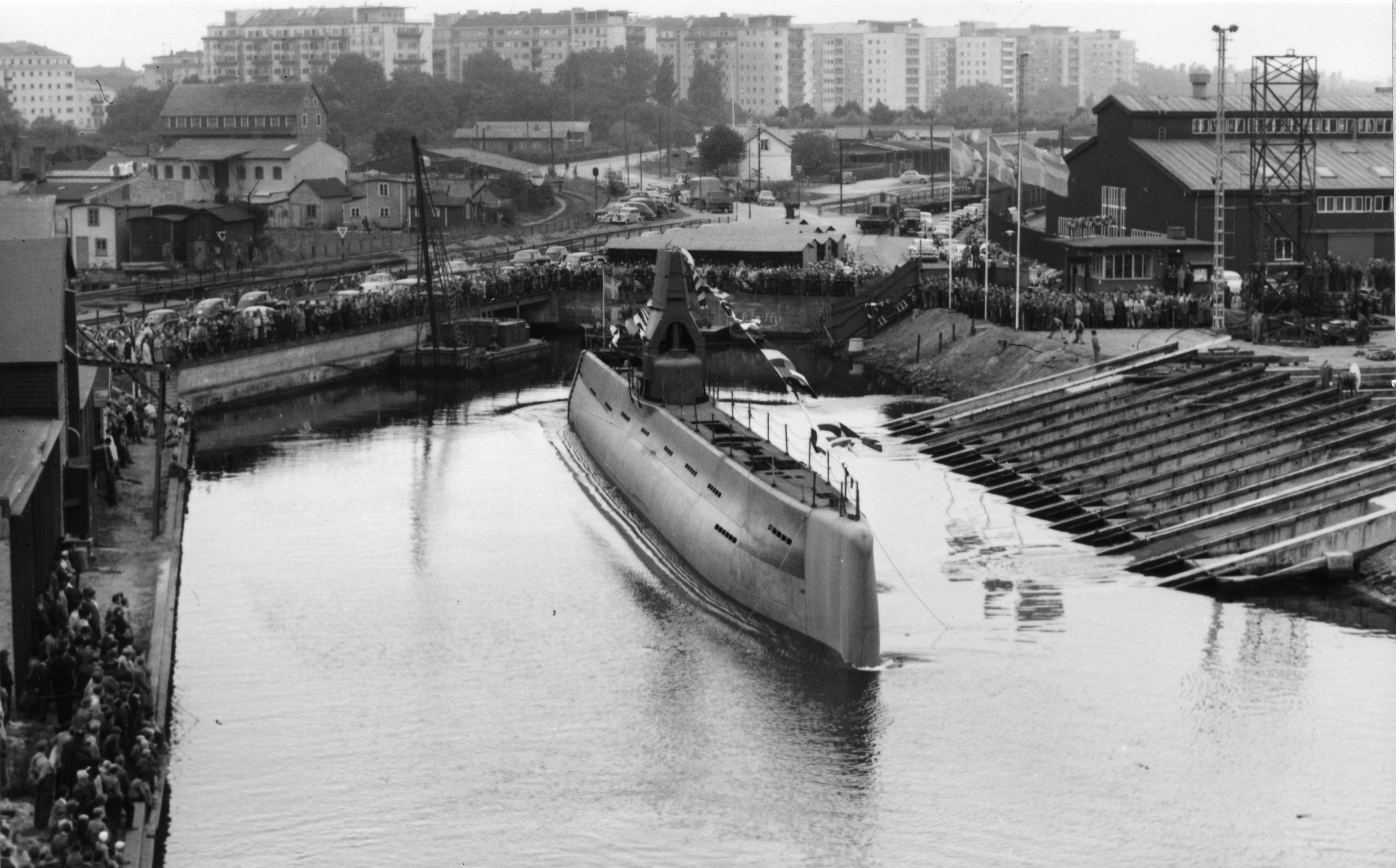

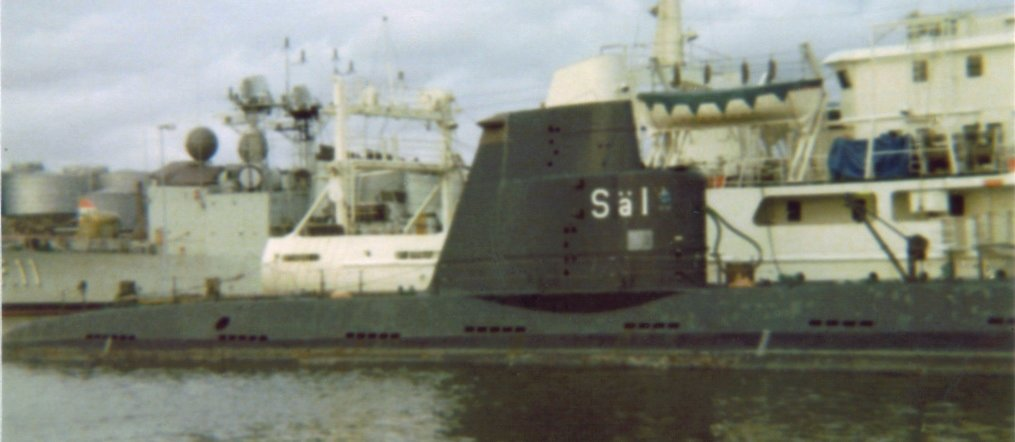
HSwMS Sälen in 1977
