= Neptun-class submarine =

Swedish submarine class built by Kockums

Class overview
- Name: Neptun-class
- Builders: Kockums
- Operators: Swedish Navy
- Preceded by: Sjölejonet class
- Succeeded by: Hajen class
- Built: 1942-43
- Planned: 3
- Completed: 3
- Retired: 3

General characteristics
- Type: Submarine
- Displacement: 550 tonnes (surfaced); 730 tons (submerged)
- Length: 62.6 m (205 ft 5 in)
- Beam: 6.4 m (21 ft 0 in)
- Draught: 3.4 m (11 ft 2 in)
- Propulsion: 2 shaft diesel electric; 2 MAN diesels 1,800 hp (1,300 kW); 2 electric motors 1,000 hp (750 kW)
- Speed: 15 kn (28 km/h; 17 mph) surfaced; 10 kn (19 km/h; 12 mph) submerged
- Complement: 35
- Armament: 5 x 533 mm (21 in) torpedo tubes; 1 x 40 mm (1.6 in) AA gun; 1 x 20 mm (0.79 in) AA gun; 20 mines

The Neptun-class submarine was a Swedish submarine class built by Kockums. The first submarine was launched in 1942 and a total of three submarines were built: HSwMS Neptun, HSwMS Najad and HSwMS Nacken. The class was decommissioned in 1966.

== Ships ==
Name	Marking	Laid Down	Launched	Commissioned	Fate
Näcken	Nä	November 1941	26 September 1942	March 1943	Stricken 1 April 1966. Sold for scrap November 1970
Najad	Nj	February 1942	26 September 1942	May 1943	Stricken 1 April 1966. Sold for scrap November 1970
Neptun	Np	March 1942	17 November 1942	June 1943	Stricken 1 April 1966. Sold for scrap November 1970
