= Bävern-class submarine =

Swedish submarine class

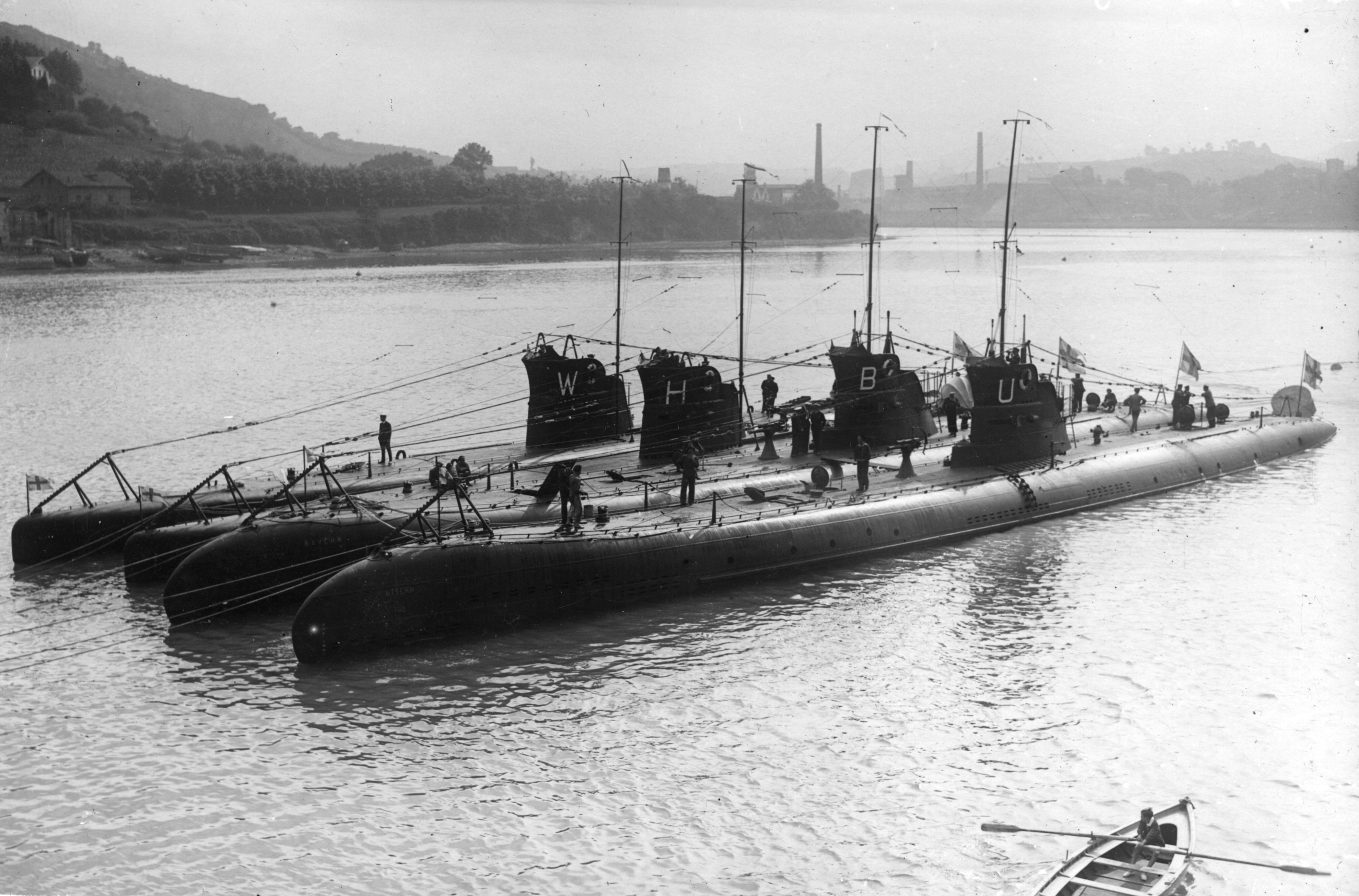
- HSwMS Bävern and Uttern (both right) alongside Hajen-class submarines

Class overview
- Name: Bävern class
- Builders: Kockums, Malmö; Karlskrona Navy Yard
- Operators: Swedish Navy
- Preceded by: Hajen class
- In service: 1921–1944
- Completed: 3
- Lost: 1
- Scrapped: 2

General characteristics
- Type: Submarine
- Displacement: Surfaced: 472 tons; Submerged: 650 tons
- Length: 57.05 m (187 ft 2 in)
- Beam: 5.82 m (19 ft 1 in)
- Draft: 3.51 m (11 ft 6 in)
- Speed: Surfaced: 15.2 knots (28.2 km/h; 17.5 mph); Submerged: 8.2 knots (15.2 km/h; 9.4 mph)
- Complement: 31
- Armament: 4 × 457 mm (18.0 in) torpedo tubes; 1 × 75 mm (3.0 in) deck gun

The Bävern class was a trio of submarines operated by the Swedish Navy between 1921 and 1944. Their design was based of the Hajen class, a Swedish derivative of the German Type UB-III U-boat. After being laid down in 1921, the boats had an uneventful service history. In 1943, Illern was involved in a collision and sank, and her two sister ships were retired the next year.

== Development and design ==
During World War I, Sweden primarily relied on the Swedish Navy to enforce the nation's neutrality. The Riksdag invested in the fleet during the war, including submarines. Swedish doctrine viewed submarines as a cheap method to counter enemy capital ships, although the Navy was often wanted more boats. In the middle of the war, Swedish naval officials were impressed by the performance of German U-boats. As a result, Kockums bought a license to the Type UB-III U-boat from AG Weser. Kockums modified the design by removing the rear torpedo tube and shortened the hull before it was offered to the Navy, who ordered three boats. The design entered service as the Hajen class, the first of which was completed in 1917.

In 1921, the Hajen-class design was improved, primarily by lengthening it by 3 metres (9.8 ft) and having less powerful engines. The final Bävern-class design featured a length of 57.05 metres (187 ft 2 in), beam of 5.82 metres (19 ft 1 in), and a draught of 3.51 metres (11 ft 6 in), and a complement of 31. Armament consisted of four 457 mm (18.0 in) torpedo tubes and a 75 mm (3.0 in) deck gun. The boats were propelled by two diesel engines and two electric motors which produced 2,100 brake horsepower (1,600 kW) and 520 horsepower (390 kW) through two propellers. While surfaced, the boats had a maximum speed of 15.2 knots (28.2 km/h; 17.5 mph) and displaced 472 tons and had a speed of 8.2 knots (15.2 km/h; 9.4 mph) and displaced 650 tons while submerged.

The three submarines were all launched in 1921, built either at the Kockums yard in Malmö, or the Karlskrona Navy Yard. The boats operated throughout the inter-war period and most of World War II. In 1943, Illern sank following a collision and was scrapped. Her sister ships, Bävern and Uttern, were retired in 1944.

== Ships in class ==
Data
Name	Builder	Launched	Stricken	Broken up
Bävern	Kockums, Malmö	5 March 1921	6 October 1944	1956
Illern	Karlskrona Navy Yard	30 June 1921	Sank 12 August 1943	1944
Uttern	Karlskrona Navy Yard	25 July 1921	6 October 1944	1944
