= Hajen-class submarine (1954) =

Swedish Navy post-WW II submarine class

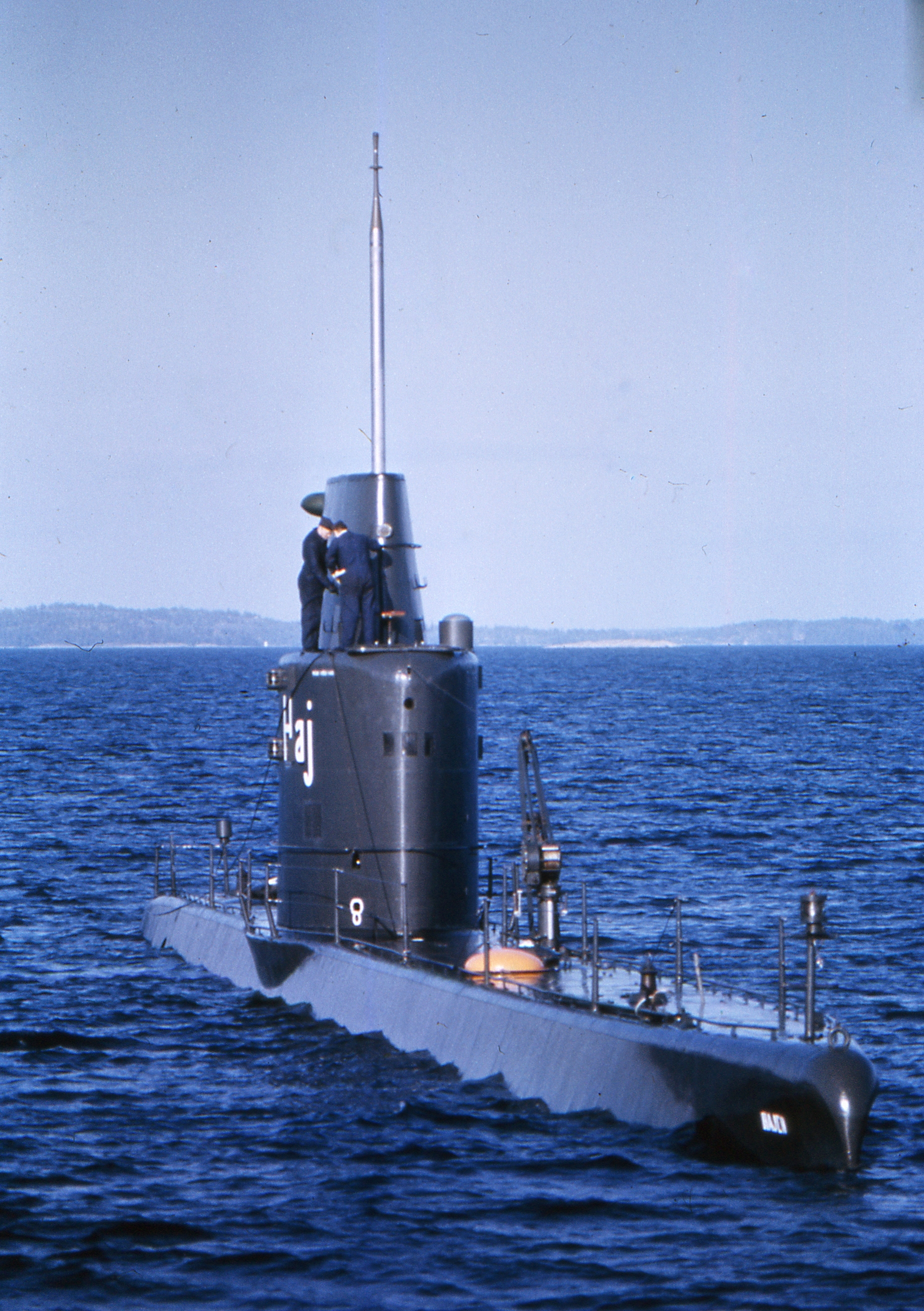
- HSwMS Hajen.

Class overview
- Builders: Kockums
- Operators: Swedish Navy
- Preceded by: Neptun class
- Succeeded by: Draken class
- Built: 1953–1960
- In commission: 1957–1980
- Planned: 6
- Completed: 6
- Active: 0
- Retired: 6

General characteristics
- Type: Submarine
- Displacement: 720 tonnes (Surfaced); 900 tonnes submerged
- Length: 65.8 m (215 ft 11 in)
- Beam: 5.1 m (16 ft 9 in)
- Draught: 5.0 m (16 ft 5 in)
- Propulsion: 2 shaft diesel-electric; 2 Pielstick Diesels 1,660 hp (1,240 kW); 2 ASEA electric motors
- Speed: 16 kn (30 km/h) surfaced; 20 kn (37 km/h) submerged
- Complement: 44
- Armament: 4 × 533 mm Torpedo Tubes (bow, 8 torpedoes)

The Hajen class, also known as the Hajen III class, was a series of submarines built by Kockums and operated by the Swedish Navy. The design was influenced by the German Type XXI submarine. A total of six submarines were built between 1954 and 1958 and were kept in service until 1980.

The first Hajen-class submarine to be built was HSwMS Hajen in 1954, followed by HSwMS Sälen (1955), HSwMS Valen (1955), HSwMS Illern (1957), HSwMS Bävern (1958), and HSwMS Uttern (1958).

== See also ==
Equivalent submarines of the same era

- Aréthuse class
- Type 205
- Toti class
- Natsushio class
