= HSwMS Vargen =

Three warships of Sweden have been named Vargen, after Vargen:

- HSwMS Vargen (1716), a warship launched in 1716.
- HSwMS Vargen (1790), a warship launched in 1790.
- HSwMS Vargen (1960), a Draken II-class submarine launched in 1960 and stricken in 1989.
