= HSwMS Gripen =

Seven warships of Sweden have been named Gripen, after Gripen:

- HSwMS Gripen (1677), a warship launched in 1677.
- HSwMS Gripen (1713), a galley launched in 1713.
- HSwMS Gripen (1715), a frigate launched in 1715.
- HSwMS Gripen (1750), a frigate launched in 1750.
- HSwMS Gripen (1775), a frigate launched in 1775.
- HSwMS Gripen (1928), a Draken I-class submarine launched in 1928 and stricken in 1947.
- HSwMS Gripen (1960), a Draken II-class submarine launched in 1960 and stricken in 1989.
