= HSwMS Nordkaparen =

Two warships of Sweden have been named Nordkaparen, after the North Atlantic right whale:

- HSwMS Nordkaparen (1935), a Delfinen-class submarine launched in 1935 and stricken in 1953.
- HSwMS Nordkaparen (1961), a Draken II-class submarine launched in 1961 and stricken in 1988.
