= Draken-class submarine =

Draken-class submarine may refer to two classes of submarines of the Swedish Navy:

- Draken-class submarine (1926), 3 boats
- Draken-class submarine (1960), 6 boats

== See also ==
- HSwMS Draken
- Draken (disambiguation)
- List of submarines of the Swedish Navy
