= HSwMS Springaren =

Two warships of Sweden have been named Springaren, after Springaren:

- HSwMS Springaren (1935), a Delfinen-class submarine launched in 1935 and stricken in 1956.
- HSwMS Springaren (1961), a Draken II-class submarine launched in 1961 and stricken in 1987.
