= HSwMS Draken =

Six warships of Sweden have been named Draken, after Draken:

- HSwMS Draken (1595), a warship launched in 1595.
- HSwMS Draken (1656), a warship launched in 1926 and ran aground in 1677.
- HSwMS Draken (1717), a galley launched in 1717.
- HSwMS Draken, a sloop-of-war wrecked in Bigbury Bay in 1798.
- HSwMS Draken (1926), a Draken I-class submarine launched in 1926 and stricken in 1948.
- HSwMS Draken (1960), a Draken II-class submarine launched in 1960 and stricken in 1982.
