= HSwMS Draken (1960) =

Draken-class submarine of the Swedish Navy

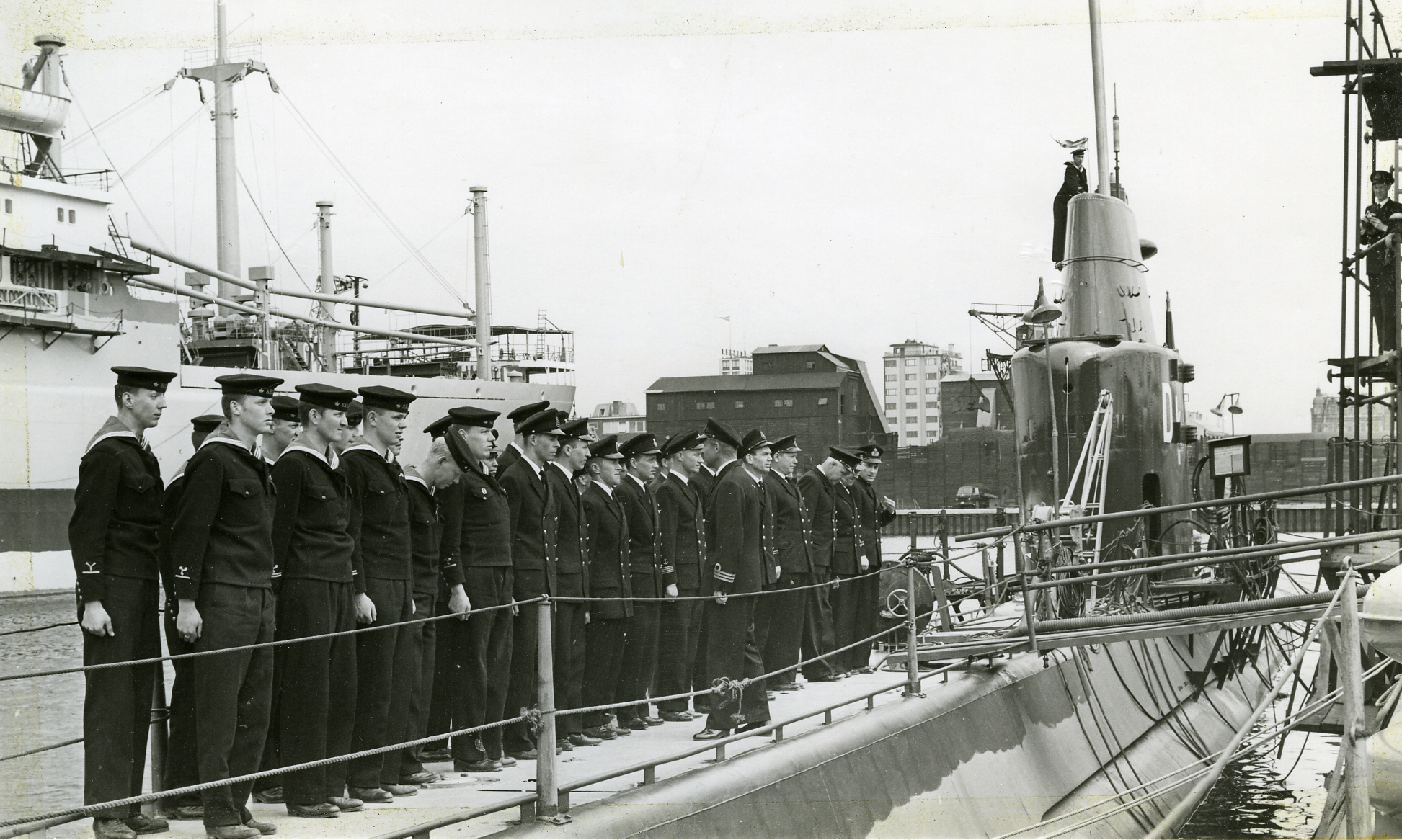
- HSwMS Draken in 1961

History

Sweden
- Name: Draken
- Namesake: Draken
- Builder: Saab Kockums
- Launched: 1 April 1960
- Commissioned: 4 April 1962
- Decommissioned: 1982
- Identification: Dk; Dra
- Fate: Scrapped, 1983

General characteristics
- Class & type: Draken-class submarine
- Displacement: 770 t (758 long tons), surfaced; 950 t (935 long tons), submerged
- Length: 69.3 m (227 ft)
- Beam: 5.1 m (17 ft)
- Draught: 5.3 m (17 ft)
- Propulsion: 1 shaft diesel-electric; 2 Pielstick Diesels 1660 hp; 2 ASEA electric motors
- Speed: 17 knots (31 km/h; 20 mph) surfaced; 22 knots submerged
- Complement: 36
- Armament: 4 × 533mm torpedo tubes(bow, 12 torpedoes)

HSwMS Draken (Dk), Sw. meaning The Dragon, was the lead boat of the Draken-class submarine of the Swedish Navy.

== Construction and career ==
HSwMS Draken was launched on 1 April 1960 by Saab Kockums, Malmö and commissioned on 4 April 1962. She became the first Swedish submarine (but the only one in the class) to be fitted with a rubber-coated hull to reduce the surface area for active sonar detection.

She was decommissioned in 1982 and scrapped in Landskrona in 1983.

== Gallery ==
HSwMS Draken

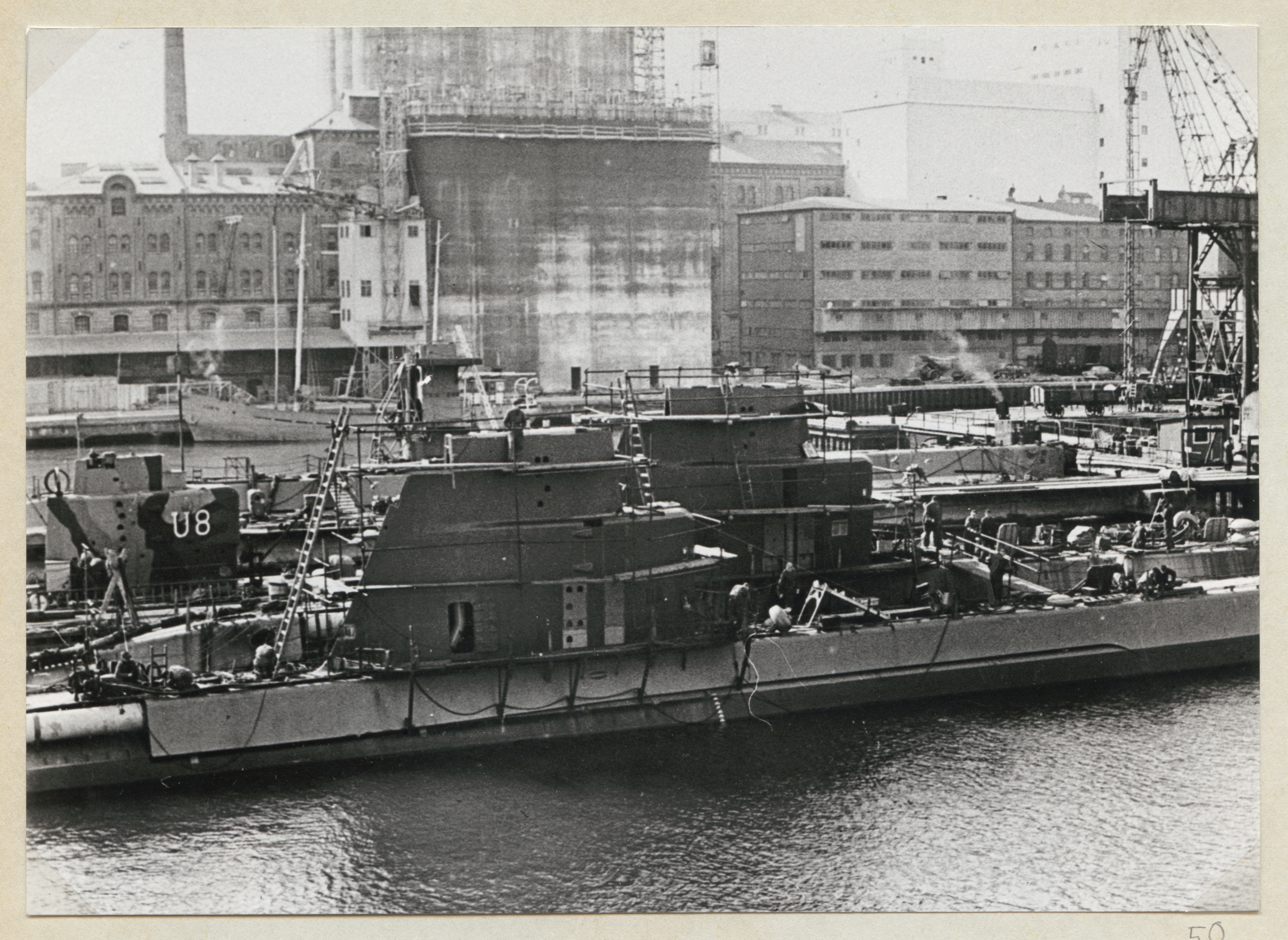
HSwMS Draken, Vergen, Nordkaparen and U8 In April 1961
