= HSwMS Springaren (1961) =

Draken-class submarine of the Swedish Navy

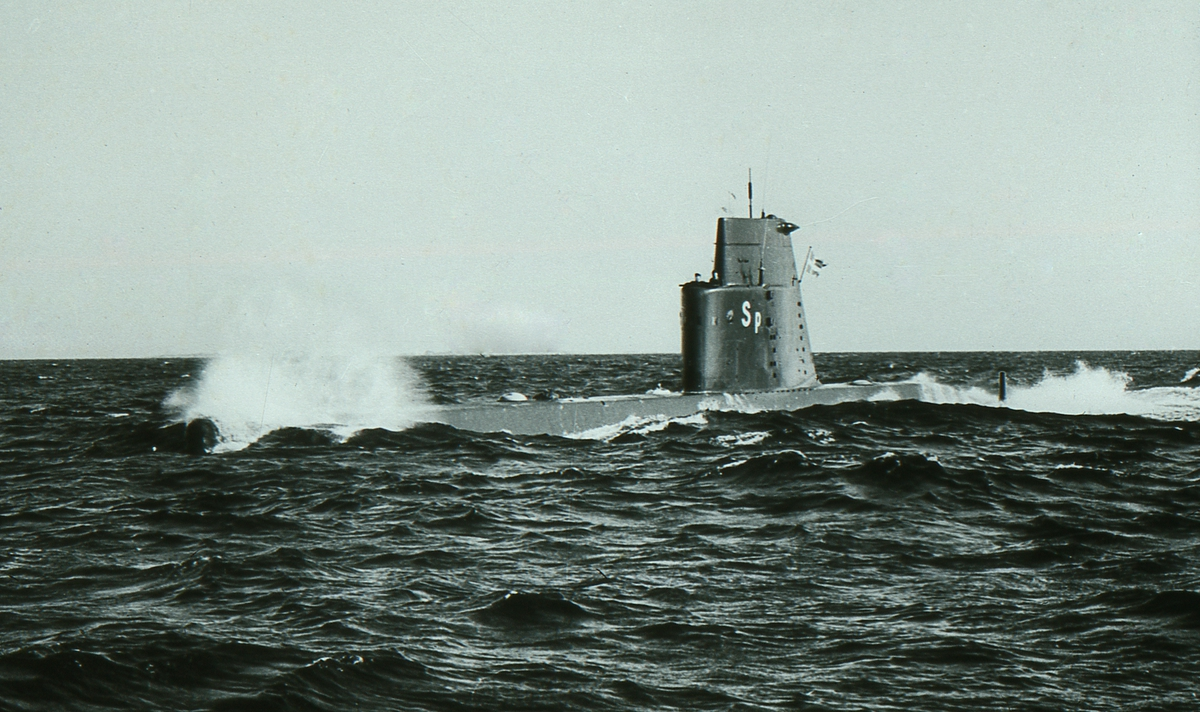
- HSwMS Springaren

History

Sweden
- Name: Springaren
- Namesake: Springaren
- Builder: Saab Kockums
- Launched: 31 August 1961
- Commissioned: 7 November 1962
- Decommissioned: 1 October 1987
- Identification: Sp; Spr
- Motto: Vade Retro Audaces Fortuna Juvat; (Fold Here! Happiness Stands The Bold Bee)
- Fate: Scrapped, 1999

General characteristics
- Class & type: Draken-class submarine
- Displacement: 770 t (758 long tons), surfaced; 950 t (935 long tons), submerged
- Length: 69.3 m (227 ft)
- Beam: 5.1 m (17 ft)
- Draught: 5.3 m (17 ft)
- Propulsion: 1 shaft diesel-electric; 2 Pielstick Diesels 1660 hp; 2 ASEA electric motors
- Speed: 17 knots (31 km/h; 20 mph) surfaced; 22 knots submerged
- Complement: 36
- Armament: 4 × 533mm torpedo tubes(bow, 12 torpedoes)

HSwMS Springaren (Sp), was the sixth boat of the Draken-class submarine of the Swedish Navy.

== Construction and career ==
HSwMS Springaren was launched on 31 August 1961 by Saab Kockums, Malmö and commissioned on 7 November 1962.

On September 24, 1980, Springaren was extremely close to colliding with an unknown submarine east of Huvudskär. During an exercise, she operated together with one of the Navy's anti-submarine helicopters. The hydrophone operator on Springaren reads a hydrophone effect. It sounds like a rattling moped at high speed. The connecting helicopters also detect the visitor, and immediately classify it as a submarine. The incident was followed by a two-week submarine hunt.

She was decommissioned on 1 October 1987 and later scrapped in Muskö in 1999.

== Gallery ==
HSwMS Springaren

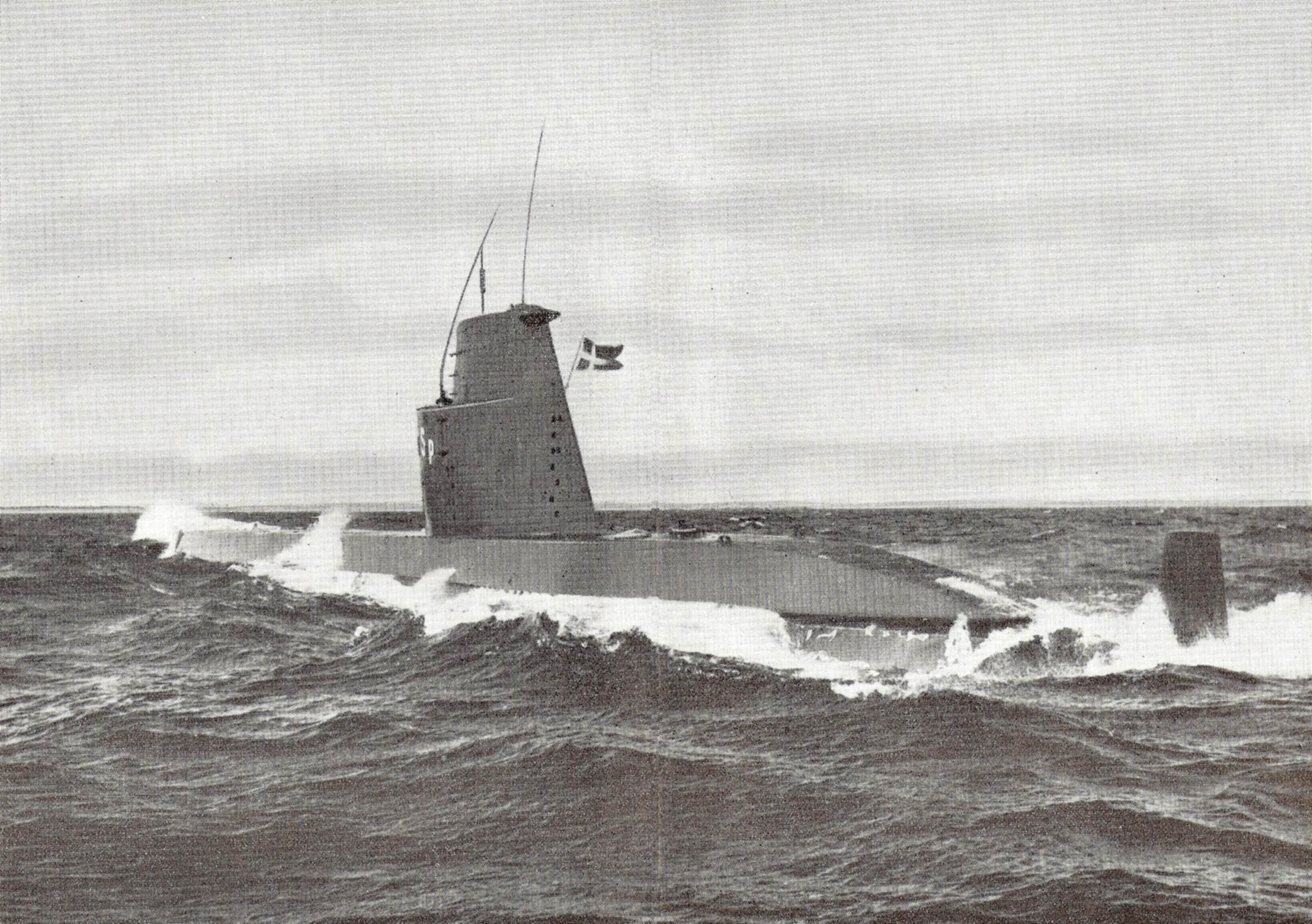
HSwMS Springaren in 1962

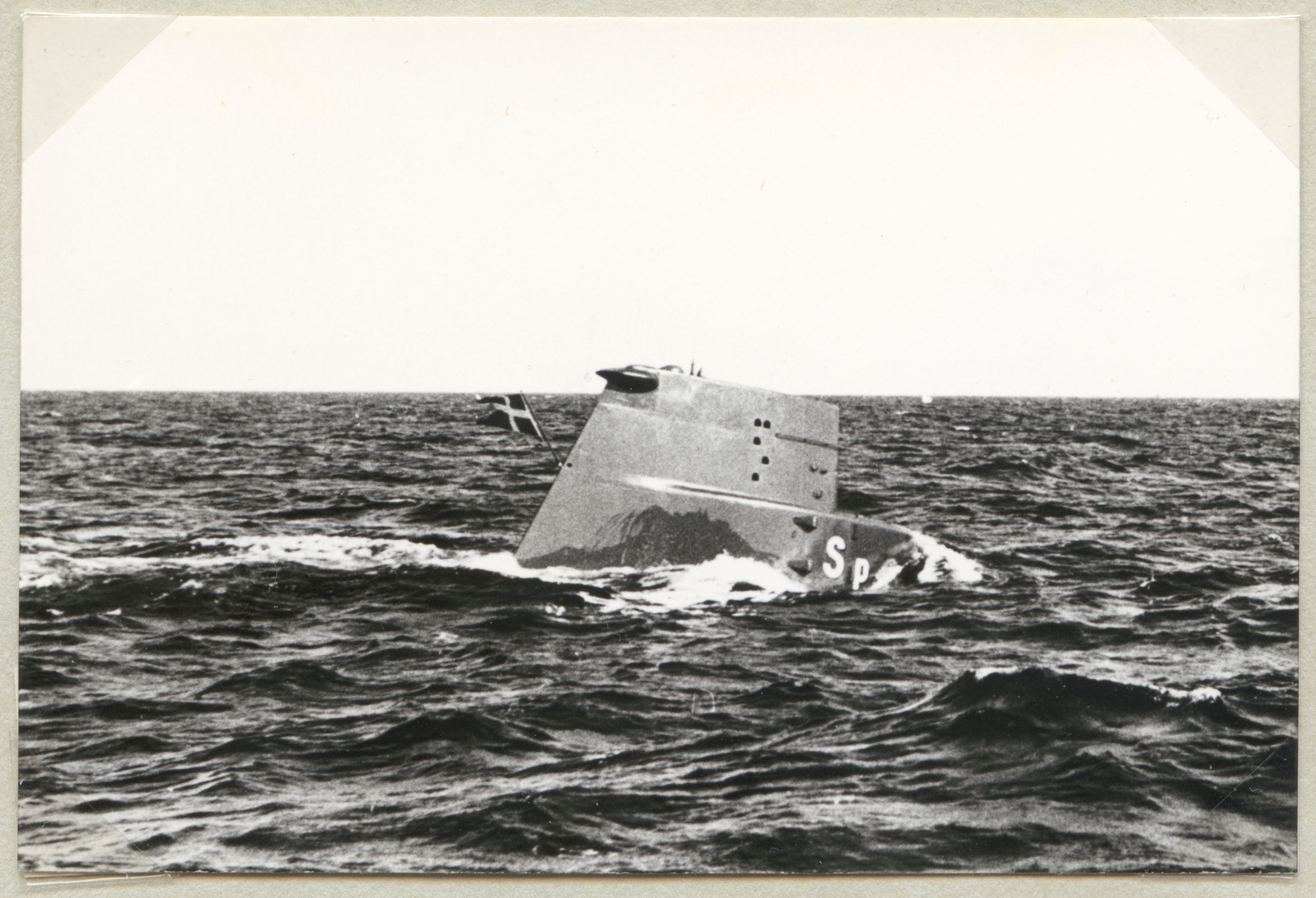

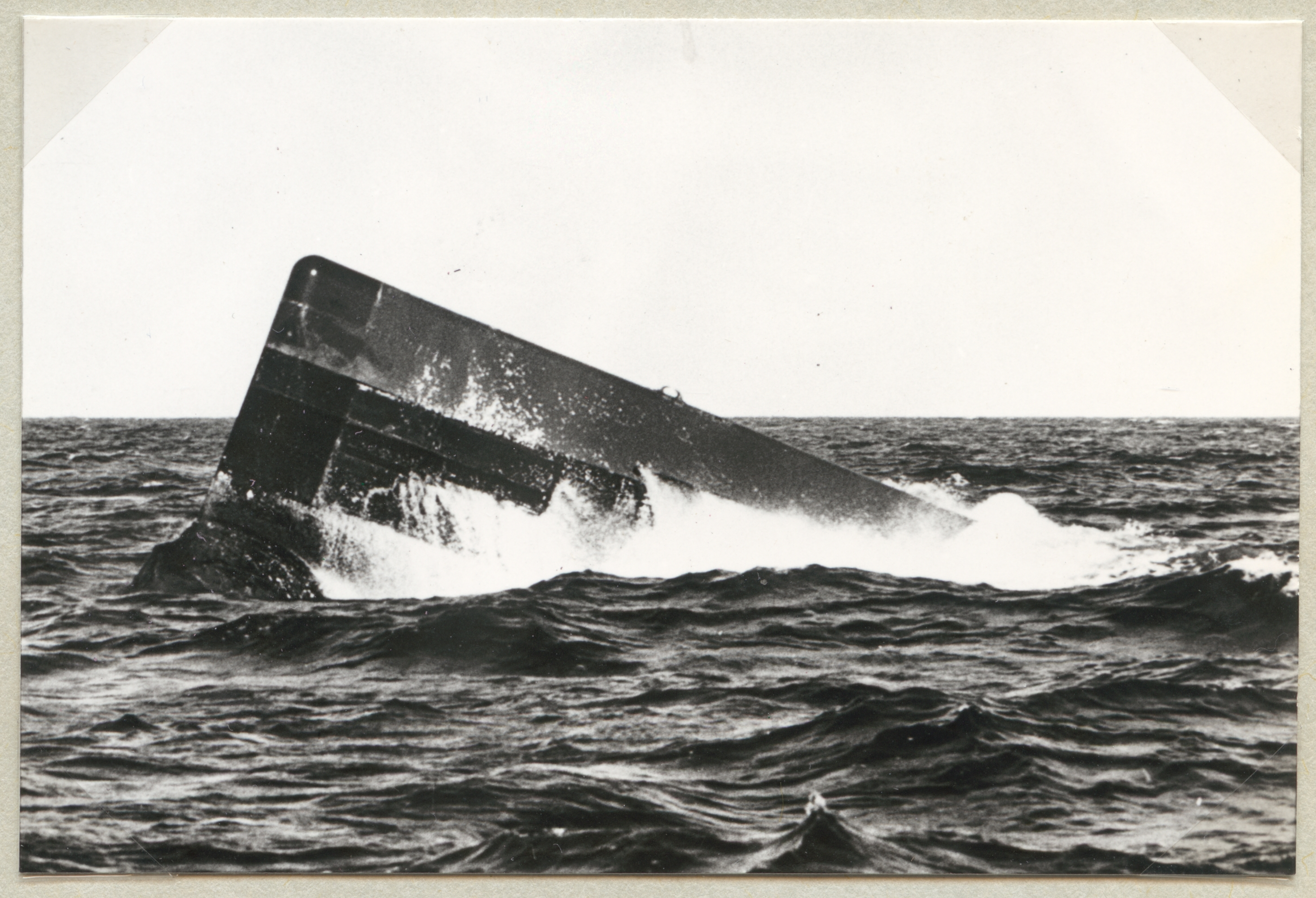

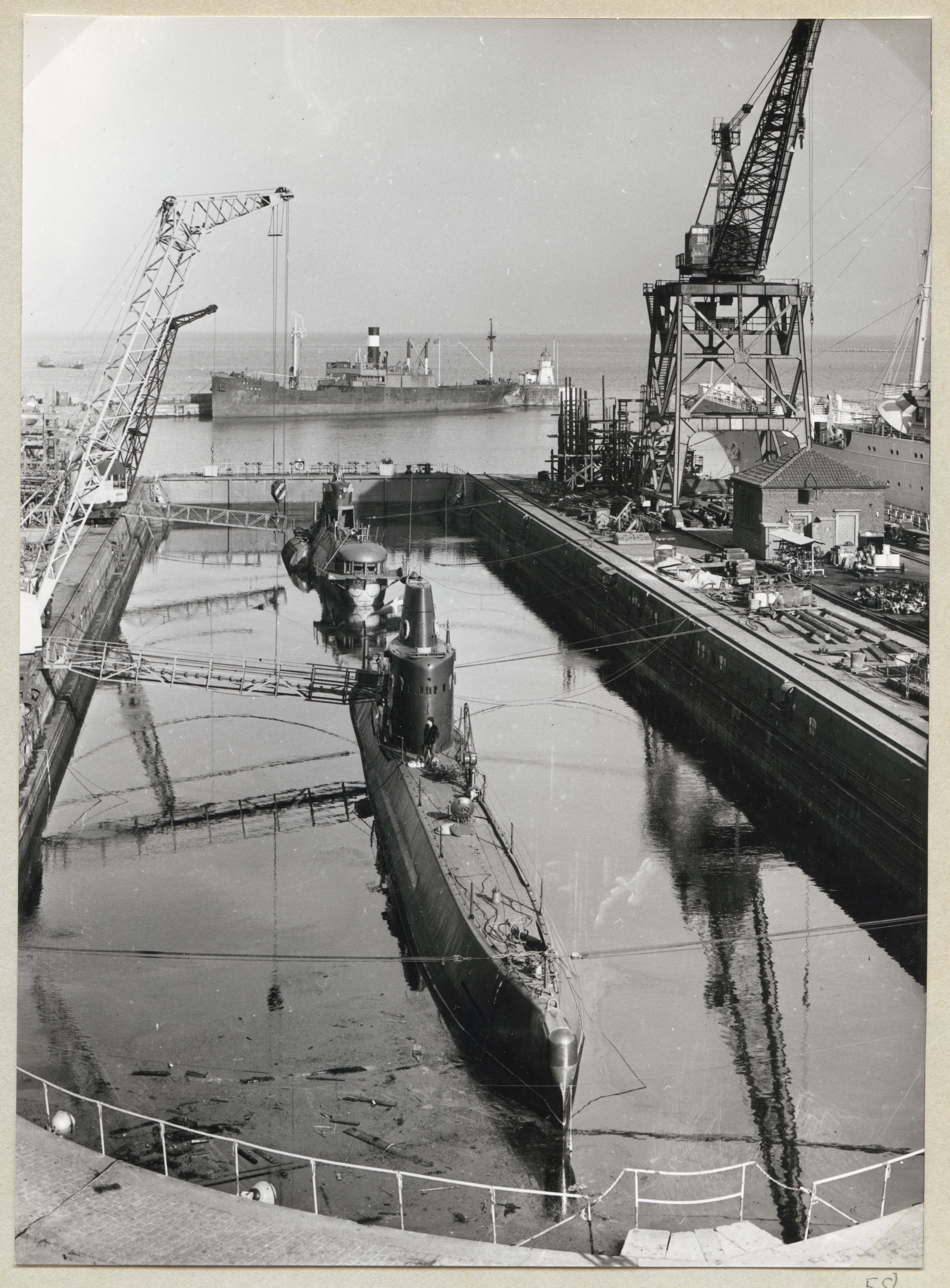
HSwMS Springaren in 1963
