= Draken =

Draken may refer to:

- Saab 35 Draken, a Swedish-manufactured fighter aircraft
- Draken International, a company providing fighter aircraft for training purposes
- The Draken, a fictional sea monster in the animated series Jumanji
- Draken, a rollercoaster in Gyeongju World
- Draken, a former cinema and concert hall in Stockholm, Sweden.
- Draken Harald Harfagre, a replica Viking longship
- Draken-class submarine

== See also ==
- Dragon (disambiguation), alternate name
- Drake (disambiguation)
- Drakan, video game series
