= Maritiman =

Floating museum in Gothenburg, Sweden

- Official logo
- Established: 1978; 48 years ago
- Location: Packhuskajen, Gothenburg, Sweden
- Coordinates: 57°42′34.0″N 11°57′36.0″E
- Type: Floating maritime museum
- Visitors: 30,000+/year
- Key people: Birger von Hall, President; Frida Svensson, Head of Operations
- Website: www.maritiman.se/en

The Maritiman is a floating maritime museum located in Gothenburg, Sweden. The exhibition ships is currently anchored at Packhuskajen on the Göta River. It is the largest floating museum in the world. The Maritiman is a member of the Swedish Military Heritage Secretariat.

== History ==
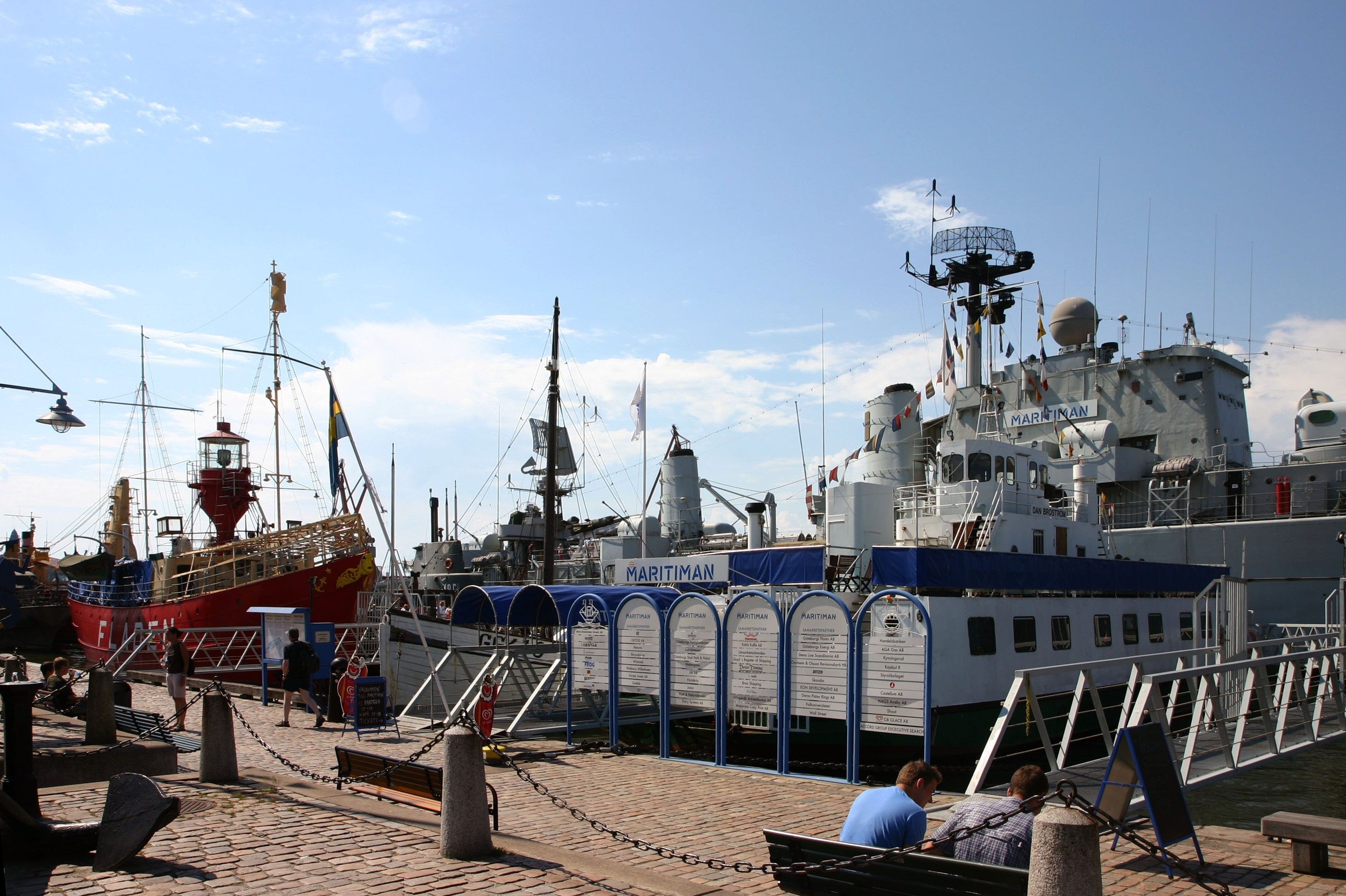
The entrance, pictured in July 2008.

Since its foundation, the port of Gothenburg has historically been an important hub for Sweden to the world's trading routes. Following the 1970s shipbuilding crisis however, the inner harbour became empty and unused. Some enthusiasts took this opportunity to rescue certain ships of historical interest from scrapping by creating the idea of a public museum. Thus, the Gothenburg Maritime Centre Foundation was established in 1985.

Struggling financially during its first years, the museum was finally opened to the public, from support provided by the Gothenburg Municipality, at Lilla Bommen during the summer of 1987. The collection of ships increased in size and was soon relocated to Packhuskajen. On 20 August 1994, King Carl XVI Gustaf officially opened the new museum.

== Collection ==
The collection consists of 10 ships. Currently, HSwMS Kalmarsund is rented to the Chalmers University of Technology.

Image	Name	Information
	Herkules	Tugboat.
	ESAB IV	Repair ship.
	Flodsprutan II	Fireboat.
	MS Stormprincess	Harbour tugboat.
	Dan Broström	Harbour ferry.
	HSwMS Småland	Halland-class destroyer.
	HSwMS Sölve	Hildur-class monitor.
	HSwMS Hugin	Hugin-class patrol boat.
	HSwMS Nordkaparen	Draken-class submarine.
	HSwMS Kalmarsund	Minelayer.

== See also ==
- East Indiaman Götheborg
