= HSwMS Delfinen (1961) =

Draken-class submarine of the Swedish Navy

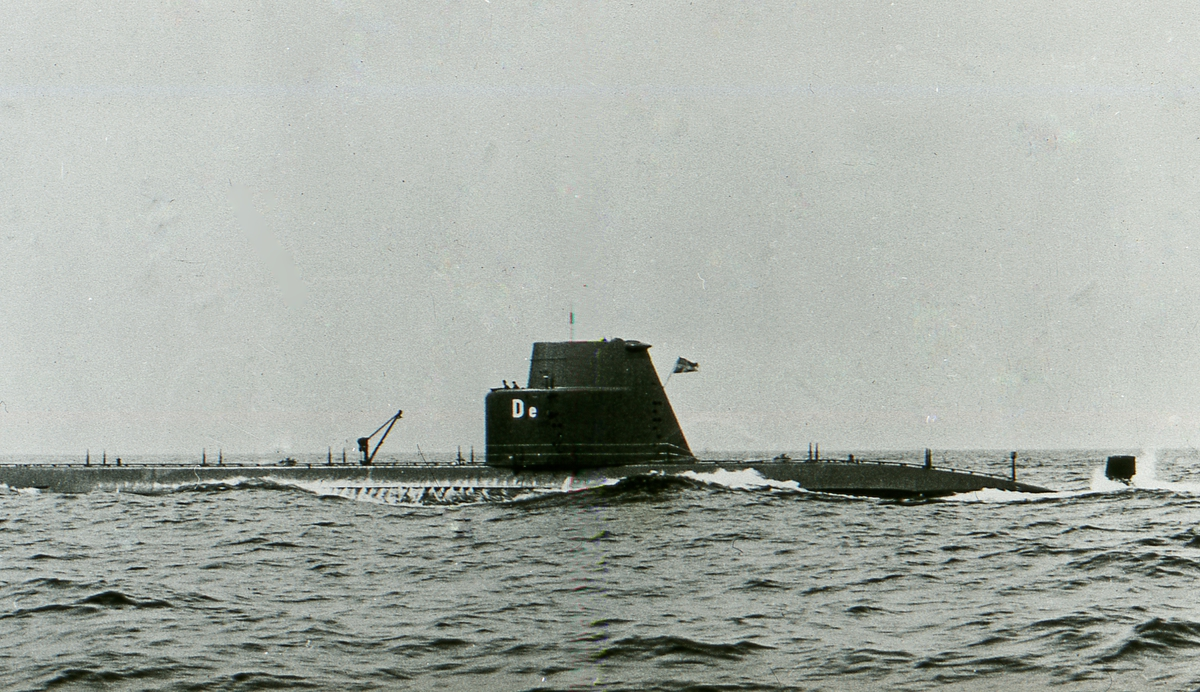
- HSwMS Delfinen

History

Sweden
- Name: Delfinen
- Namesake: Delfinen
- Builder: Saab Kockums
- Launched: 7 March 1961
- Commissioned: 7 June 1962
- Decommissioned: 1989
- Identification: De; Del
- Fate: Scrapped, 1993

General characteristics
- Class & type: Draken-class submarine
- Displacement: 770 t (758 long tons), surfaced; 950 t (935 long tons), submerged
- Length: 69.3 m (227 ft)
- Beam: 5.1 m (17 ft)
- Draught: 5.3 m (17 ft)
- Propulsion: 1 shaft diesel-electric; 2 Pielstick Diesels 1660 hp; 2 ASEA electric motors
- Speed: 17 knots (31 km/h; 20 mph) surfaced; 22 knots submerged
- Complement: 36
- Armament: 4 × 533mm torpedo tubes(bow, 12 torpedoes)

HSwMS Delfinen (De), was the fourth boat of the Draken-class submarine of the Swedish Navy.

== Construction and career ==
HSwMS Delfinen was launched on 7 March 1961 by Saab Kockums, Malmö and commissioned on 7 June 1962.

She was decommissioned in 1989 and scrapped later in Gävle in 1993.

== Gallery ==
HSwMS Delfinen

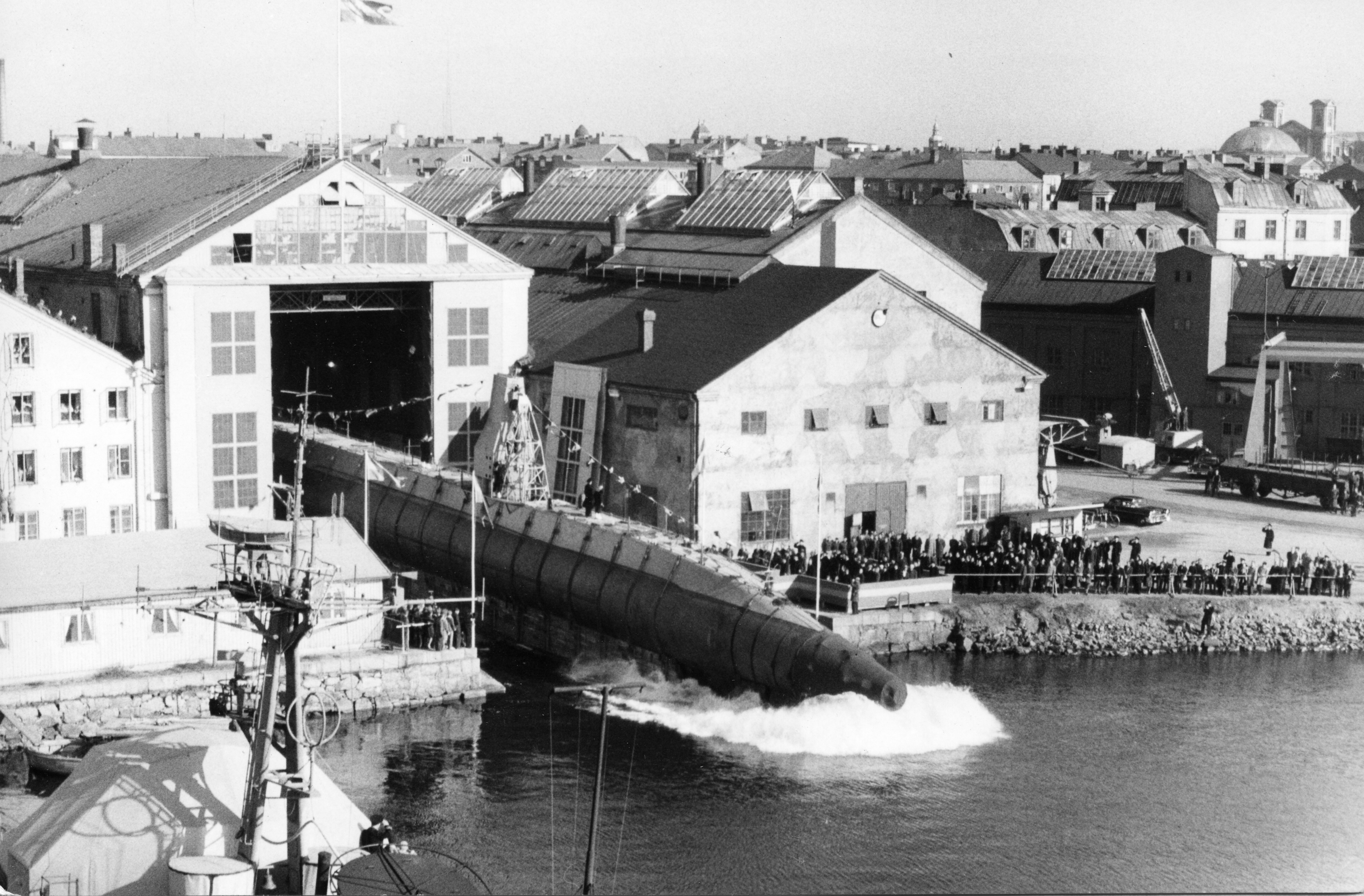
HSwMS Delfinen on 7 March 1961

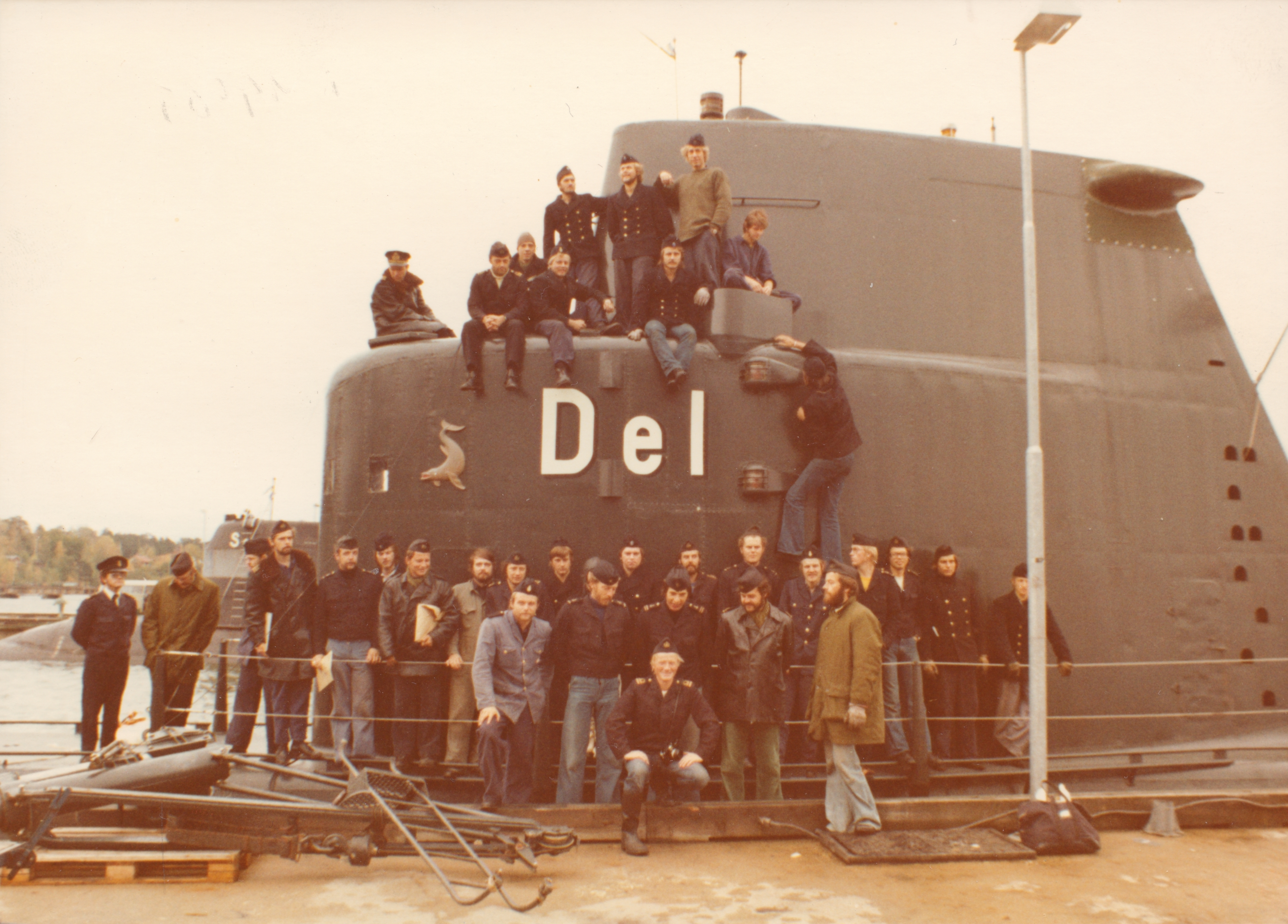
HSwMS Delfinen in 1972

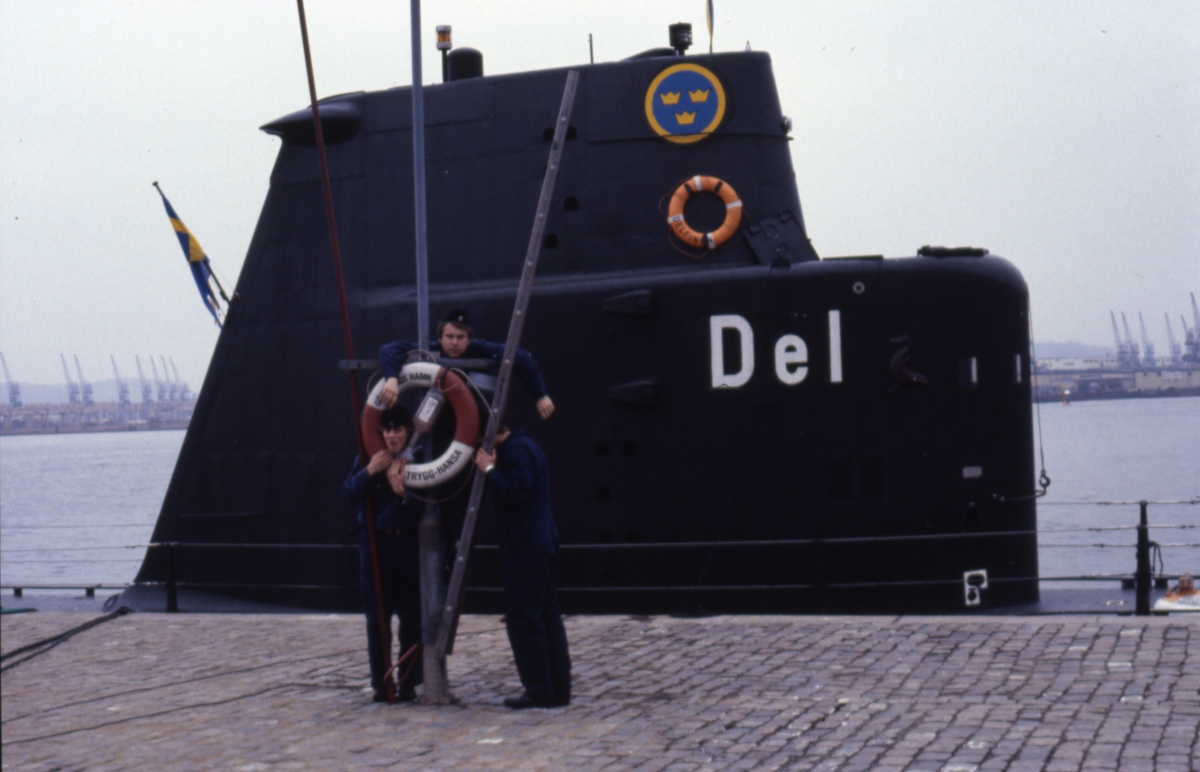
HSwMS Delfinen in 1982

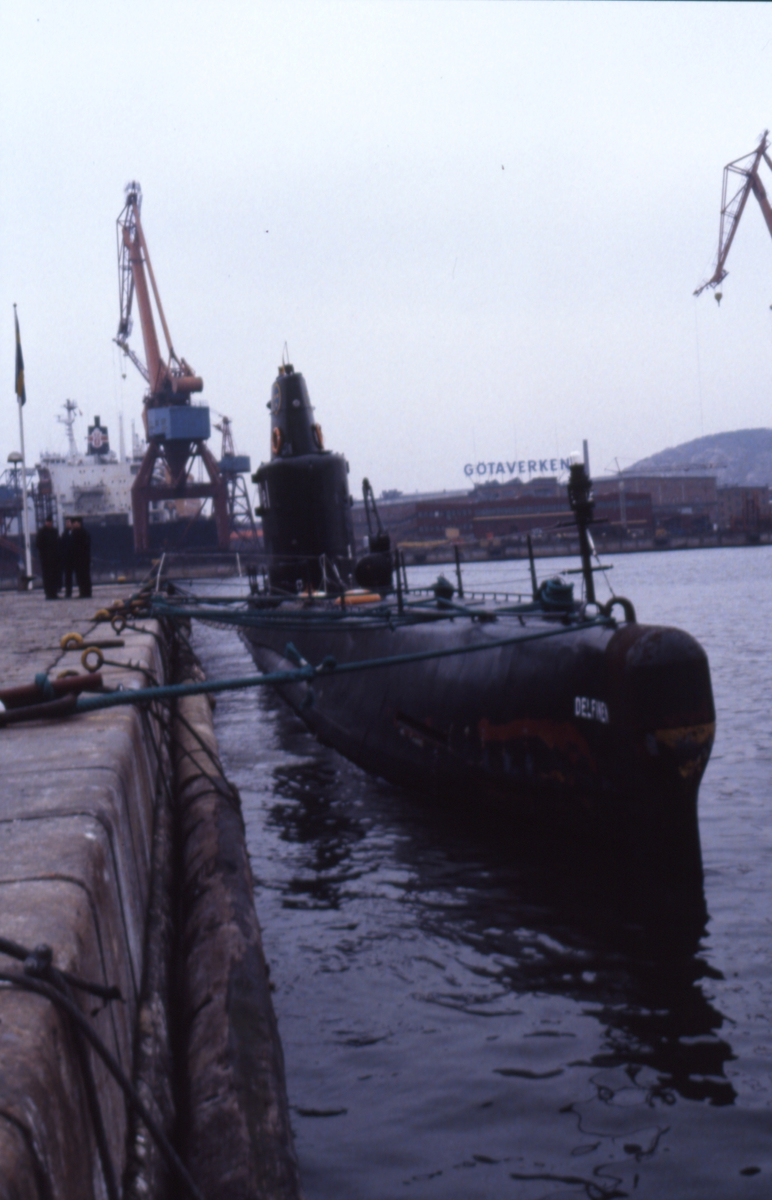
