= HSwMS Gripen (1960) =

Draken-class submarine of the Swedish Navy

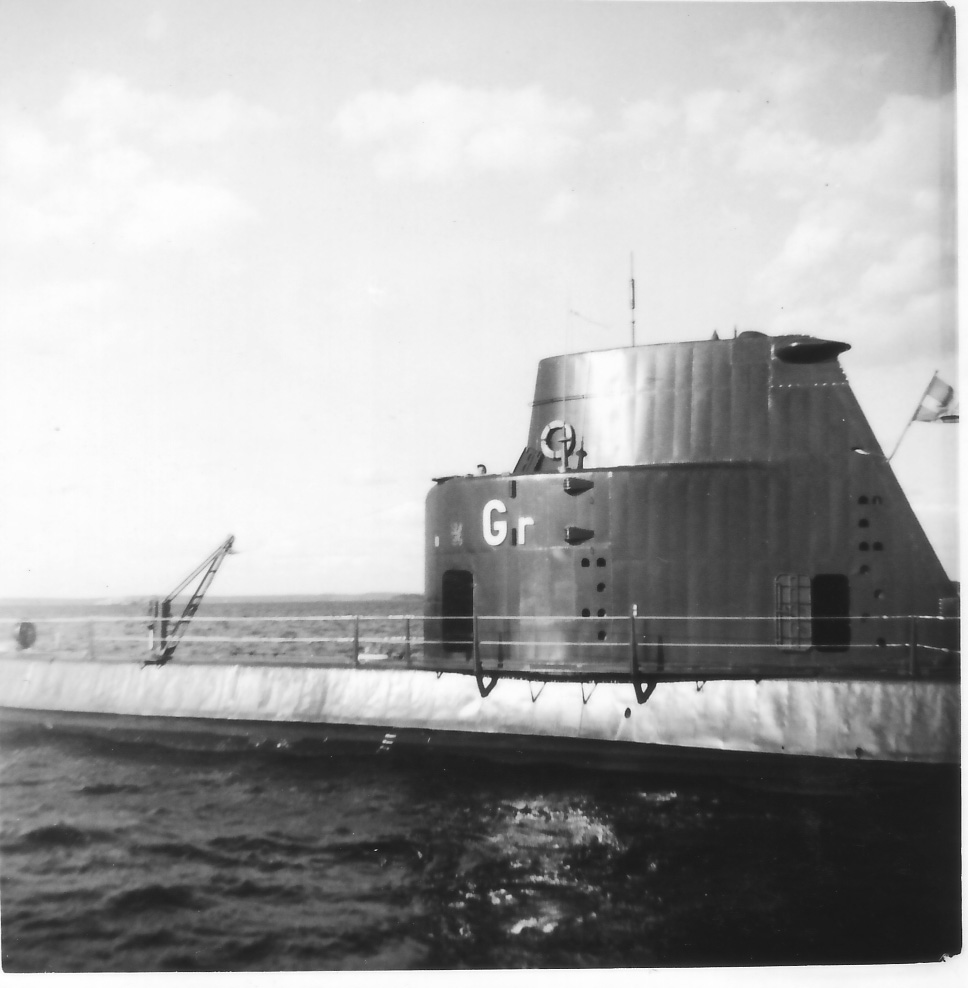
- HSwMS Gripen on 22 August 1964

History

Sweden
- Name: Gripen
- Namesake: Gripen
- Builder: Karlskronavarvet
- Launched: 31 May 1960
- Commissioned: 28 April 1962
- Decommissioned: 1982
- Identification: Gr; Gri
- Motto: Ubique vigilans; (Active everywhere)
- Fate: Scrapped, 1989

General characteristics
- Class & type: Draken-class submarine
- Displacement: 770 t (758 long tons), surfaced; 950 t (935 long tons), submerged
- Length: 69.3 m (227 ft)
- Beam: 5.1 m (17 ft)
- Draught: 5.3 m (17 ft)
- Propulsion: 1 shaft diesel-electric; 2 Pielstick Diesels 1660 hp; 2 ASEA electric motors
- Speed: 17 knots (31 km/h; 20 mph) surfaced; 22 knots submerged
- Complement: 36
- Armament: 4 × 533mm torpedo tubes(bow, 12 torpedoes)

HSwMS Gripen (Gr), was the second boat of the Draken-class submarine of the Swedish Navy.

== Construction and career ==
HSwMS Gripen was launched on 31 May 1960 by Karlskronavarvet, Karlskrona. The Minister of Defence Sven Andersson christened the submarine in the presence of, among others, Rear Admiral Sigurd Lagerman and Vice Admiral Gösta Ehrensvärd and County Governor Erik von Heland. Before the launch, the minister of defence inspected a guard of honour from the Karlskrona Naval Schools (Karlskrona örlogsskolor, KÖS). The Royal Swedish Navy Band played and the submarine glided in the water to the tune of the Swedish Navy's parade march. Minister Andersson delivered a long live for the king and the fatherland, and the Kungssången was sung. Gripen was commissioned on 28 April 1962.

She was decommissioned in 1982 and scrapped in 1989.

== Gallery ==
HSwMS Gripen

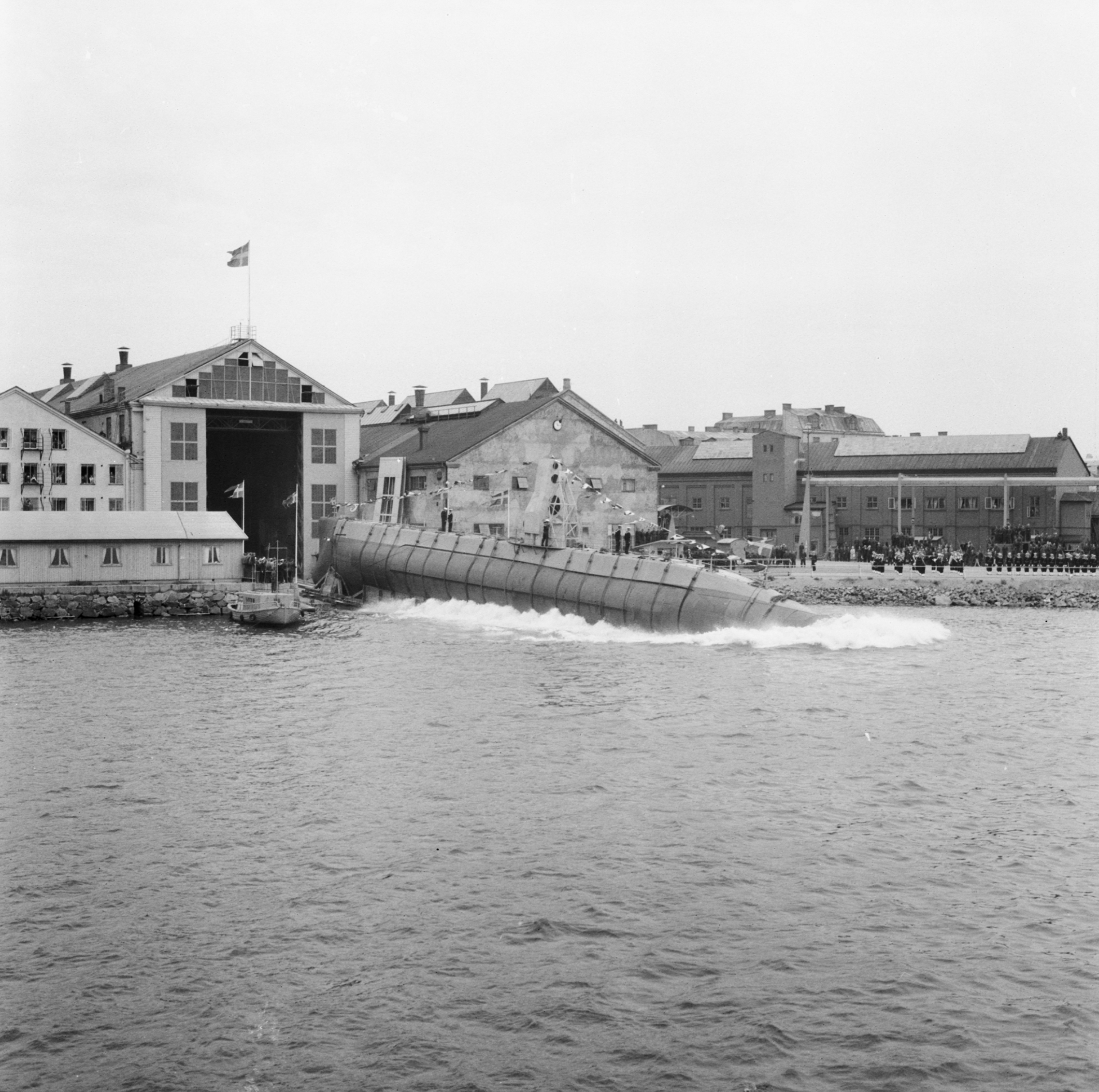
HSwMS Gripen on 31 May 1960

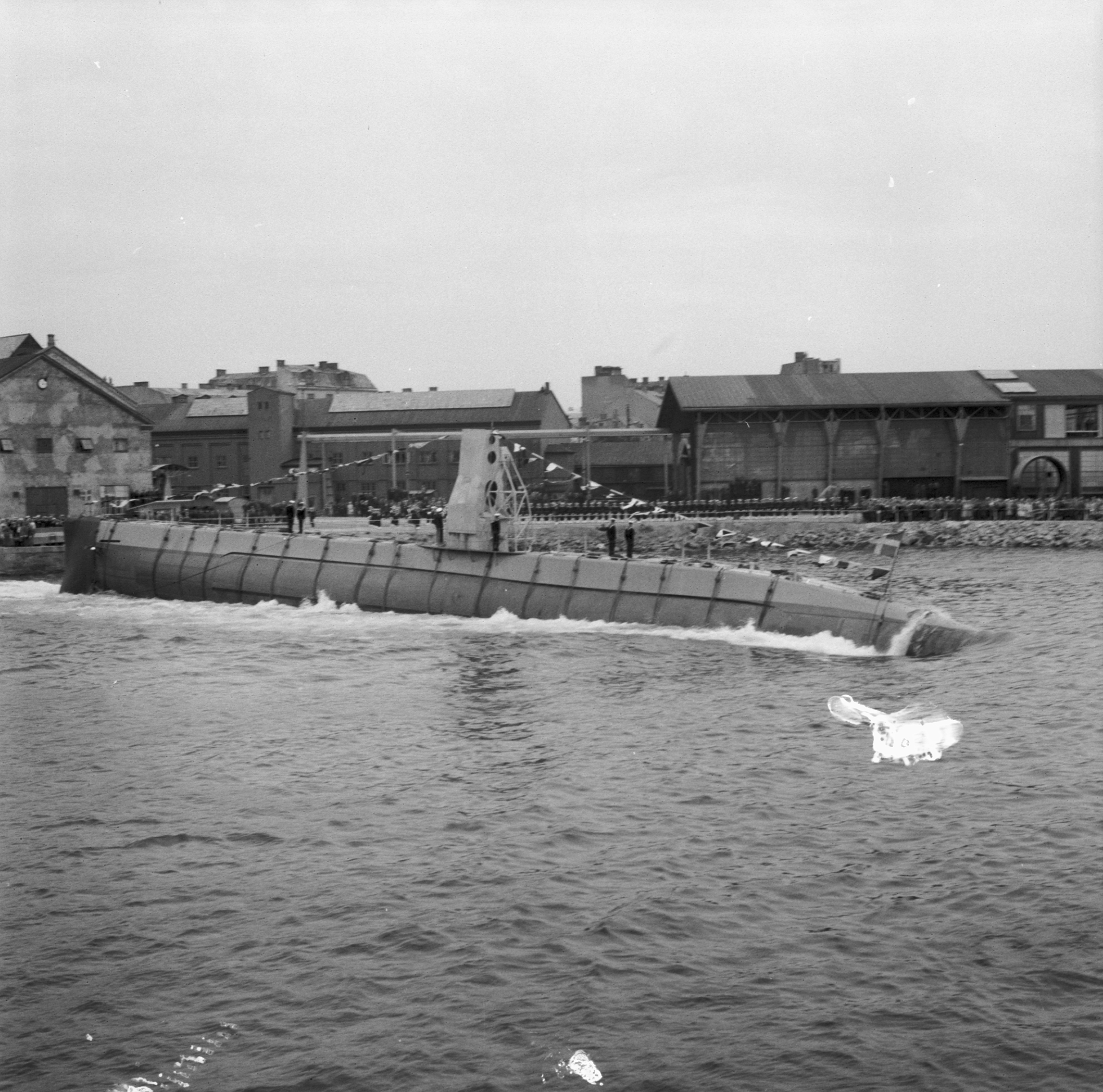

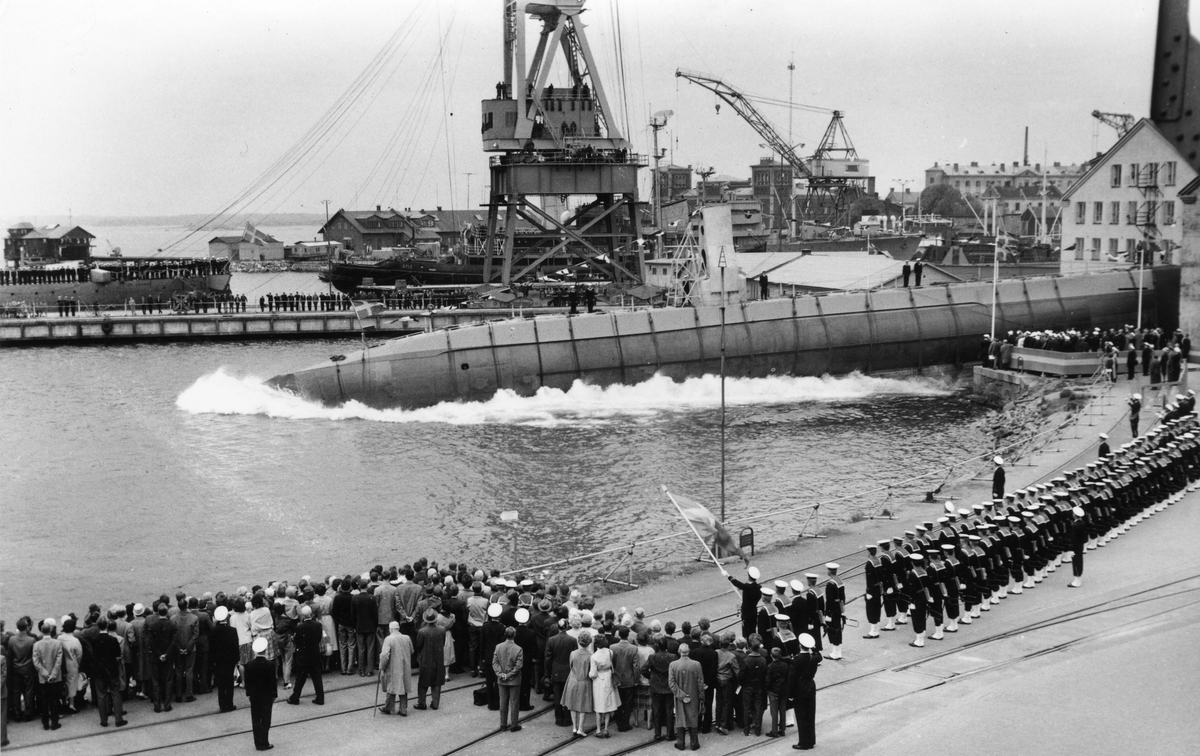

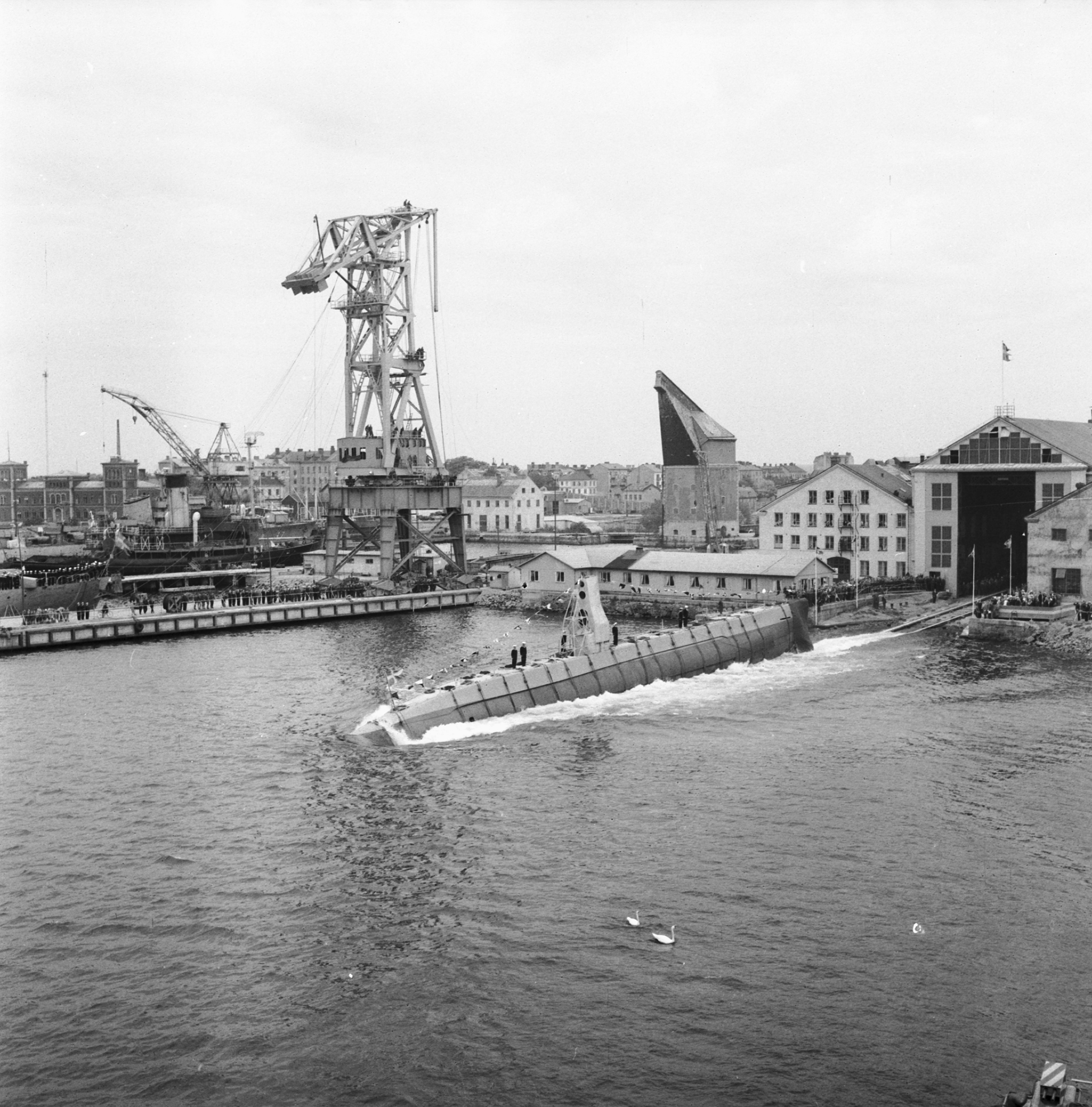
