= Erik von Heland =

Swedish politician (1880–1963)

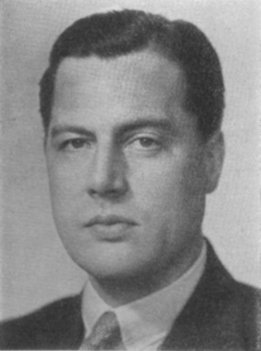
- Born: 1880
- Died: 1963 (aged 82 or 83)
- Occupation: Politician
- Political party: Centre Party

Erik von Heland (1880–1963) was a Swedish politician. He was a member of the Centre Party.
