= HSwMS Nordkaparen (1961) =

Draken-class submarine of the Swedish Navy

Coordinates: 57.7092234°N 11.9596974°E

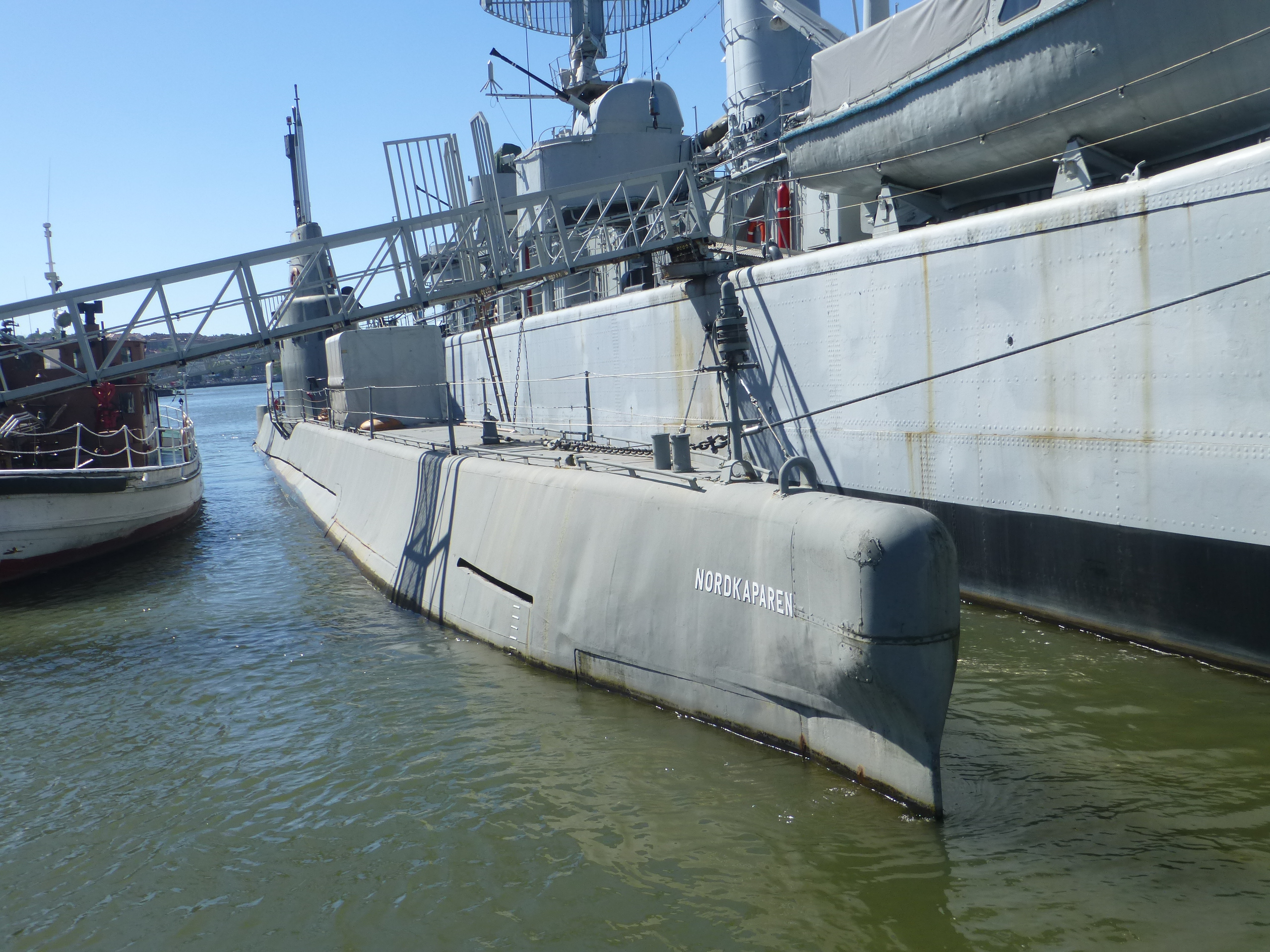
- HSwMS Nordkaparen on 19 August 2015

History

Sweden
- Name: Nordkaparen
- Namesake: Nordkaparen
- Builder: Saab Kockums
- Laid down: 1959
- Launched: 8 March 1961
- Commissioned: 4 April 1962
- Decommissioned: 1988
- Identification: Nor
- Motto: Semper In Viam; (Always On The Road)
- Status: Museum ship in Maritiman

General characteristics
- Class & type: Draken-class submarine
- Displacement: 770 t (758 long tons), surfaced; 950 t (935 long tons), submerged
- Length: 69.3 m (227 ft)
- Beam: 5.1 m (17 ft)
- Draught: 5.3 m (17 ft)
- Propulsion: 1 shaft diesel-electric; 2 Pielstick Diesels 1660 hp; 2 ASEA electric motors
- Speed: 17 knots (31 km/h; 20 mph) surfaced; 22 knots submerged
- Complement: 36
- Armament: 4 × 533mm torpedo tubes(bow, 12 torpedoes)

HSwMS Nordkaparen (Nor), was the fifth boat of the Draken-class submarine of the Swedish Navy.

== Construction and career ==
HSwMS Nordkaparen was launched on 8 March 1961 by Saab Kockums, Malmö and commissioned on 4 April 1962.

On 18 September 1980, Nordkaparen was extremely close to colliding with a foreign submarine between Utö and Huvudskär. During a speed test, Nordkaparen operated together with one of the navy's helicopters for anti-submarine warfare. This had its hydrophone immersed in the water. Just as the submarine was about to begin testing, Nordkaparen was called by the helicopter, which wondered if there were two submarines that would perform speed tests. The submarine replied that it was alone and stepped to the surface for safety reasons. Just as Nordkaparen broke the water surface, a submarine passed under the keel of the Swedish submarine by a margin of a few decimetres. The incident was followed by a two-week submarine hunt.

She was decommissioned in 1988 and became a museum ship in Maritiman, Gothenburg.

== Gallery ==
HSwMS Nordkaparen

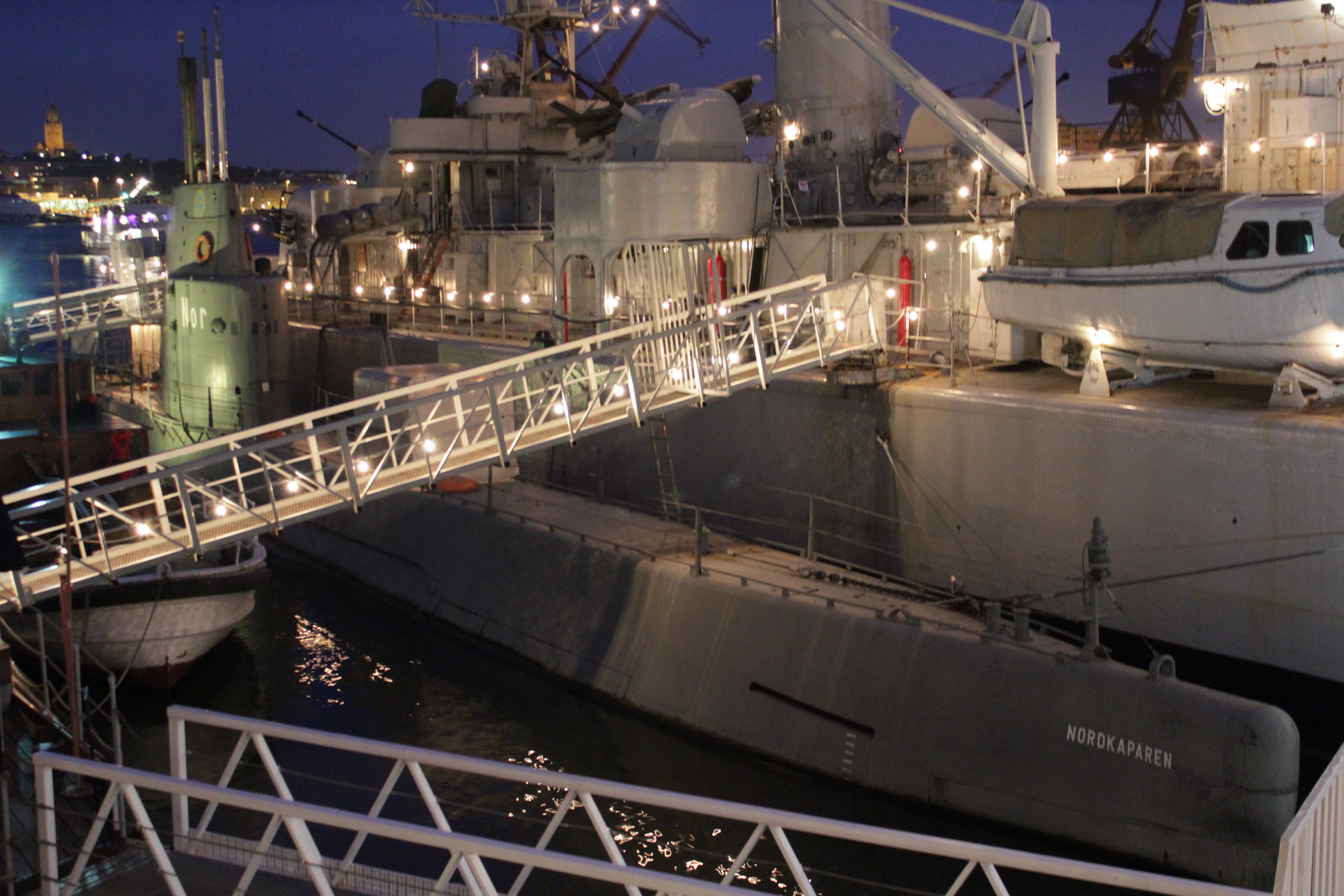
HSwMS Nordkaparen in Maritiman

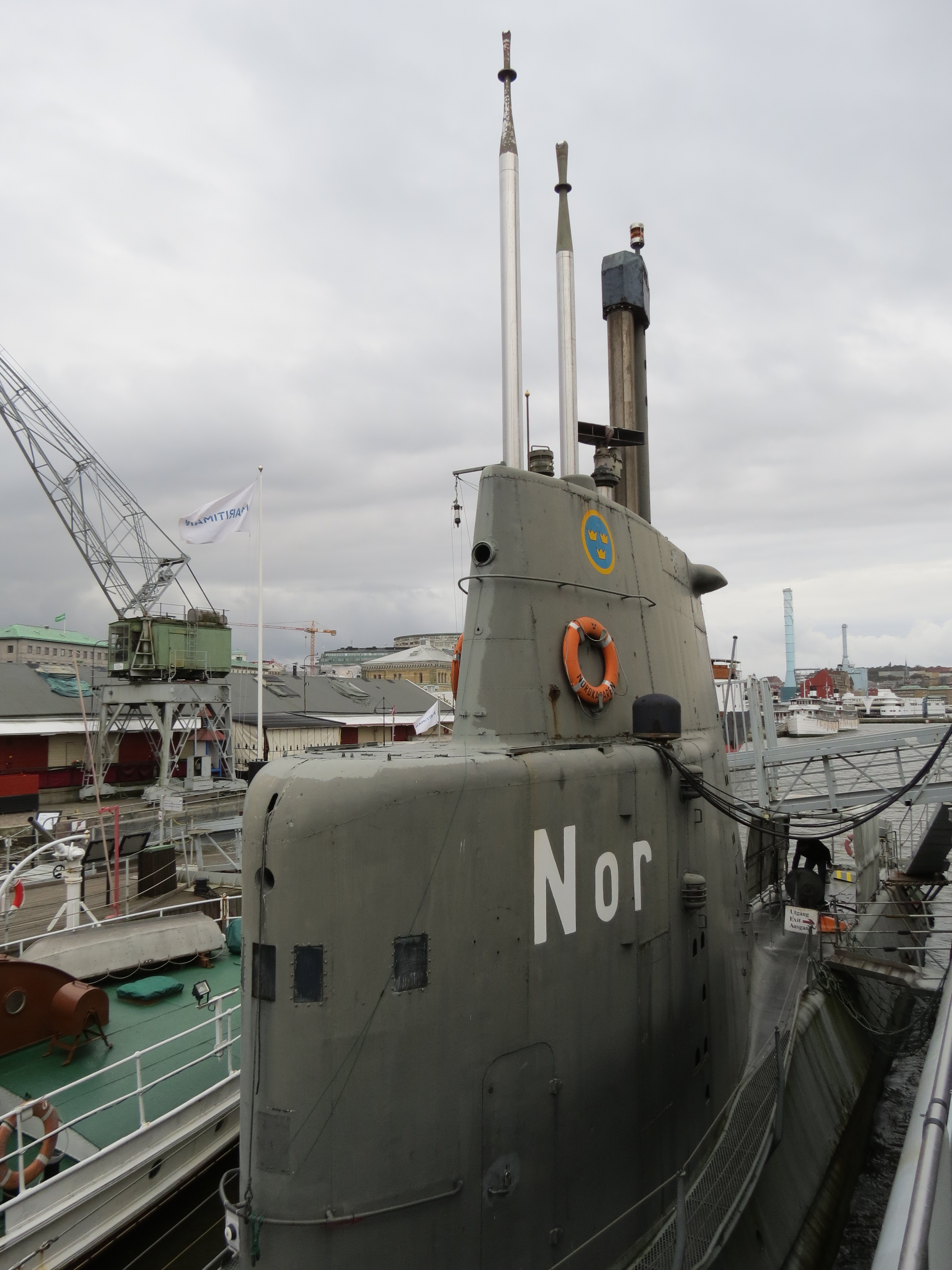

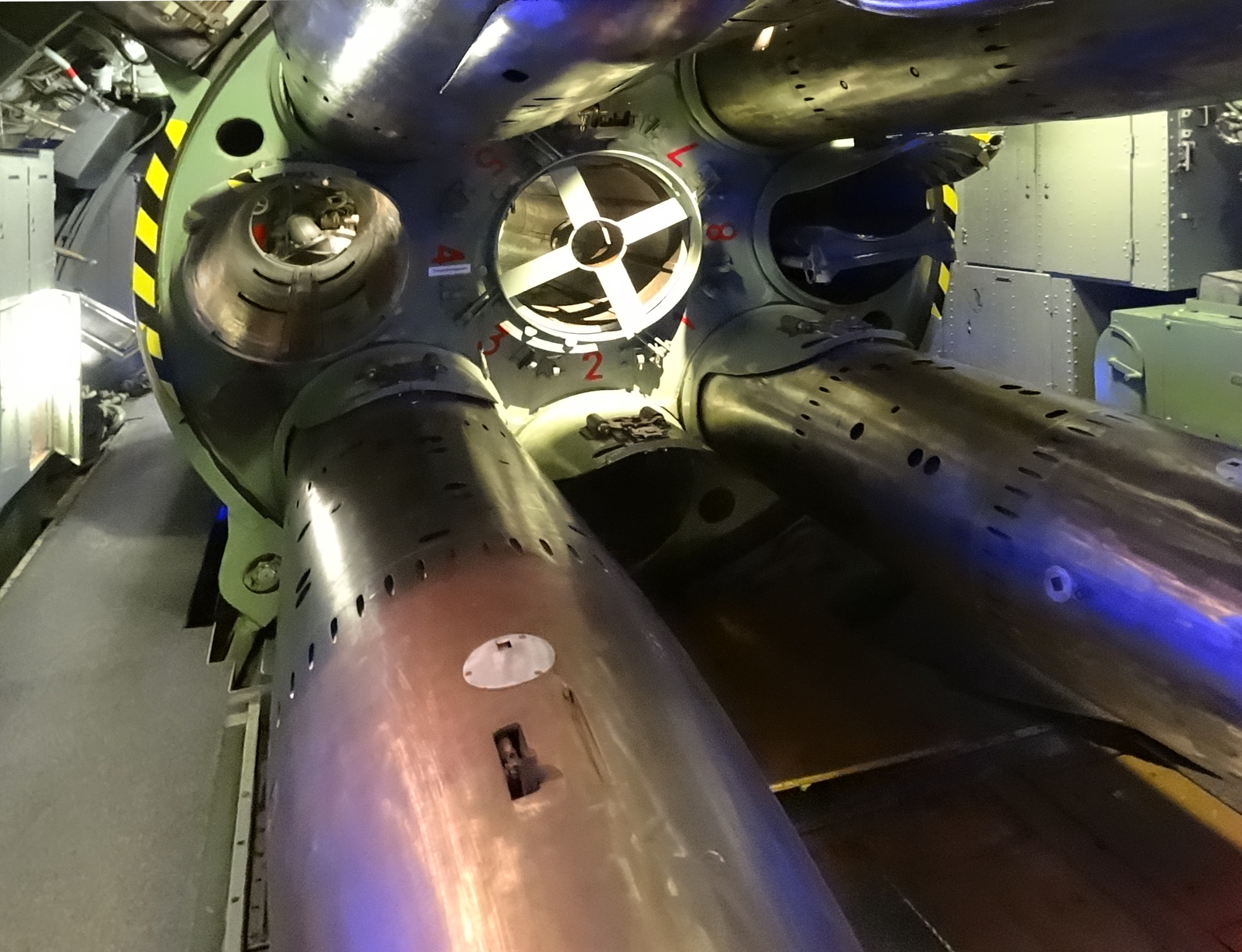

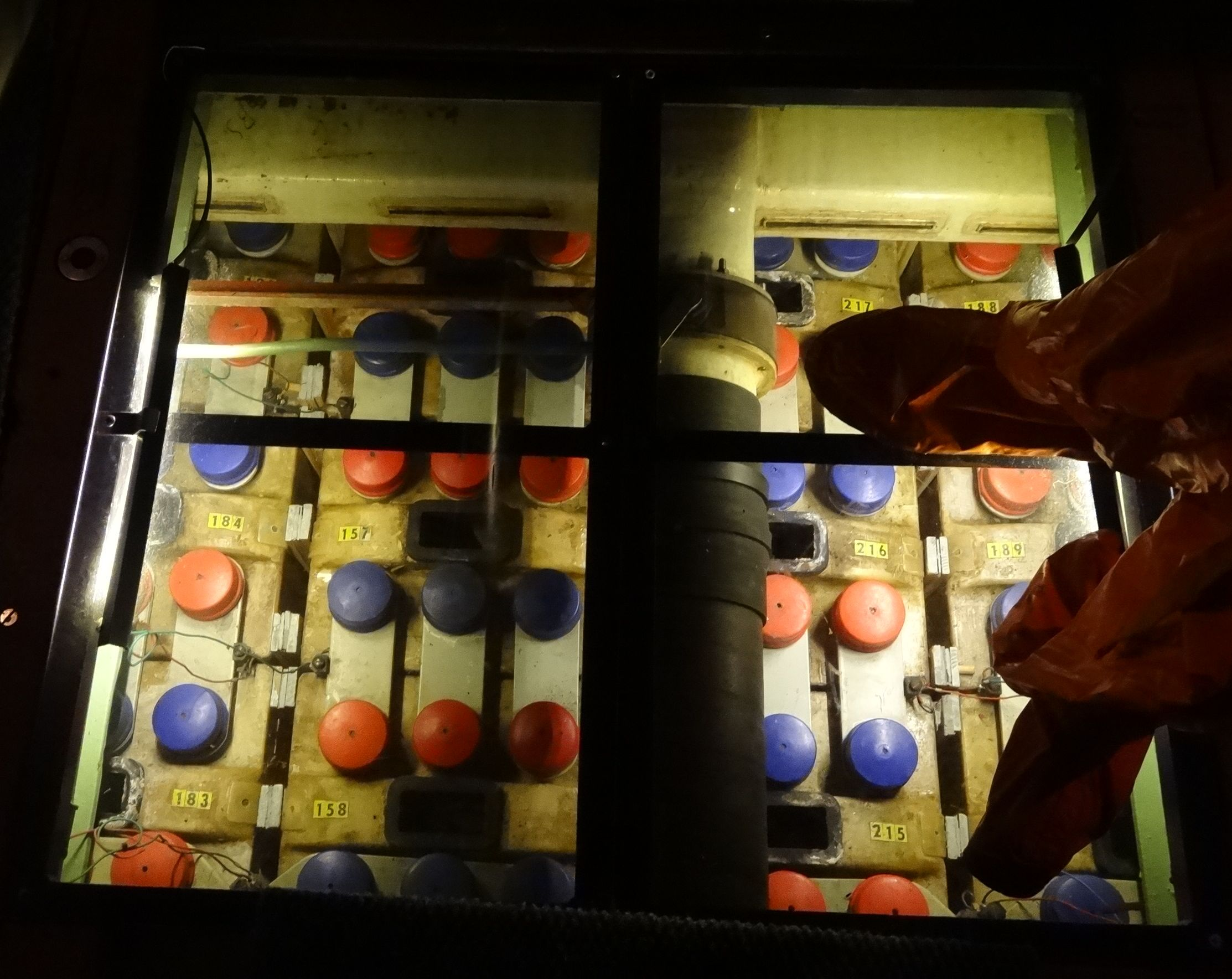
