= HSwMS Vargen (1960) =

Draken-class submarine of the Swedish Navy

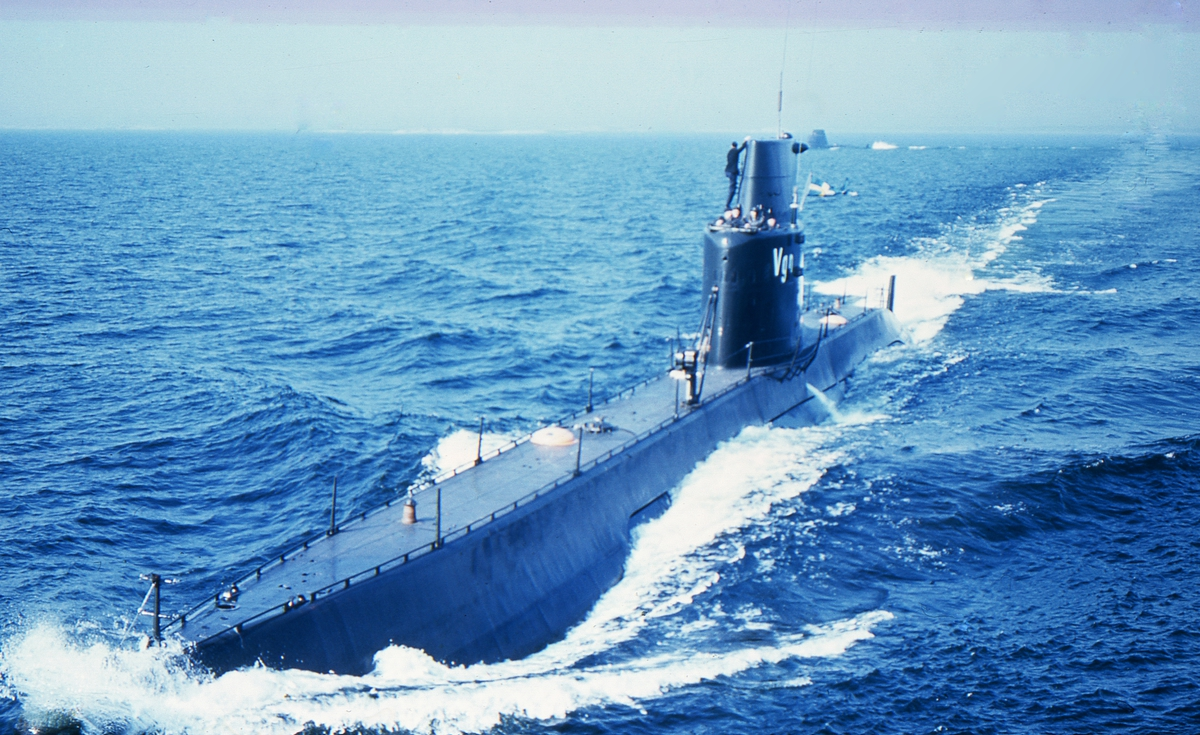
- HSwMS Vargen

History

Sweden
- Name: Vargen
- Namesake: Vargen
- Builder: Saab Kockums
- Launched: 20 May 1960
- Commissioned: 15 November 1961
- Decommissioned: 1989
- Identification: Vg; Vgn
- Motto: Lupus primus inter pares; (The foremost wolf among equals)
- Fate: Scrapped, 1989

General characteristics
- Class & type: Draken-class submarine
- Displacement: 770 t (758 long tons), surfaced; 950 t (935 long tons), submerged
- Length: 69.3 m (227 ft)
- Beam: 5.1 m (17 ft)
- Draught: 5.3 m (17 ft)
- Propulsion: 1 shaft diesel-electric; 2 Pielstick Diesels 1660 hp; 2 ASEA electric motors
- Speed: 17 knots (31 km/h; 20 mph) surfaced; 22 knots submerged
- Complement: 36
- Armament: 4 × 533mm torpedo tubes(bow, 12 torpedoes)

HSwMS Vargen (Vg), Sw. meaning The Wolf, was the second boat of the Draken-class submarine of the Swedish Navy.

== Construction and career ==
HSwMS Vargen was launched on 20 May 1960 by Saab Kockums, Malmö and commissioned on 15 November 1961.

She was decommissioned in 1989 and scrapped later in Gävle.

== Gallery ==
HSwMS Vargen

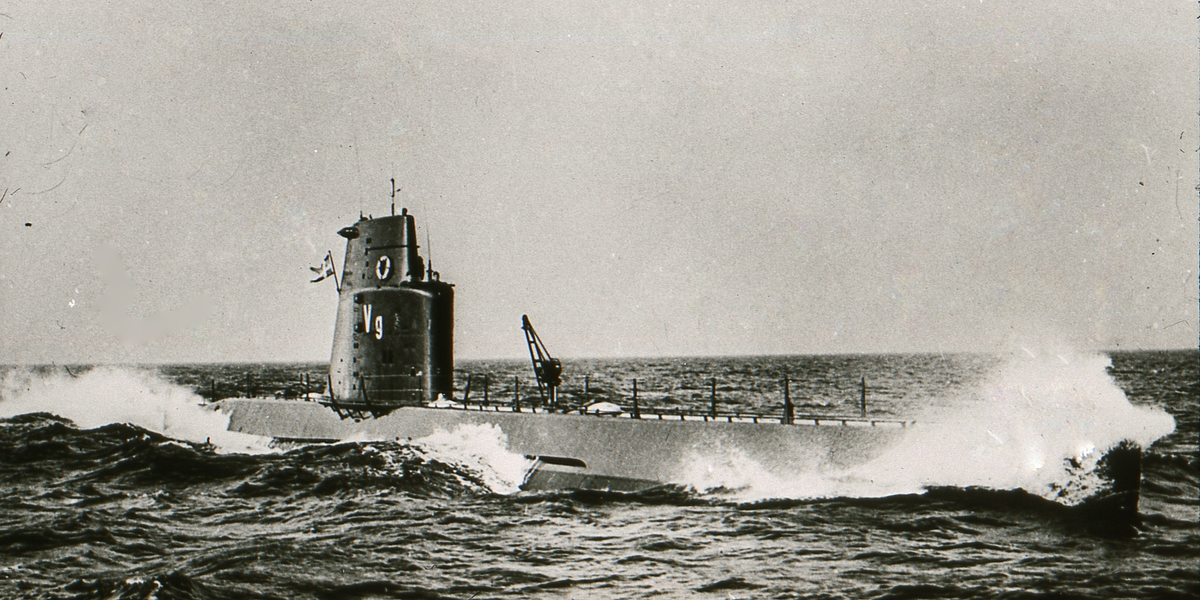
HSwMS Vargen

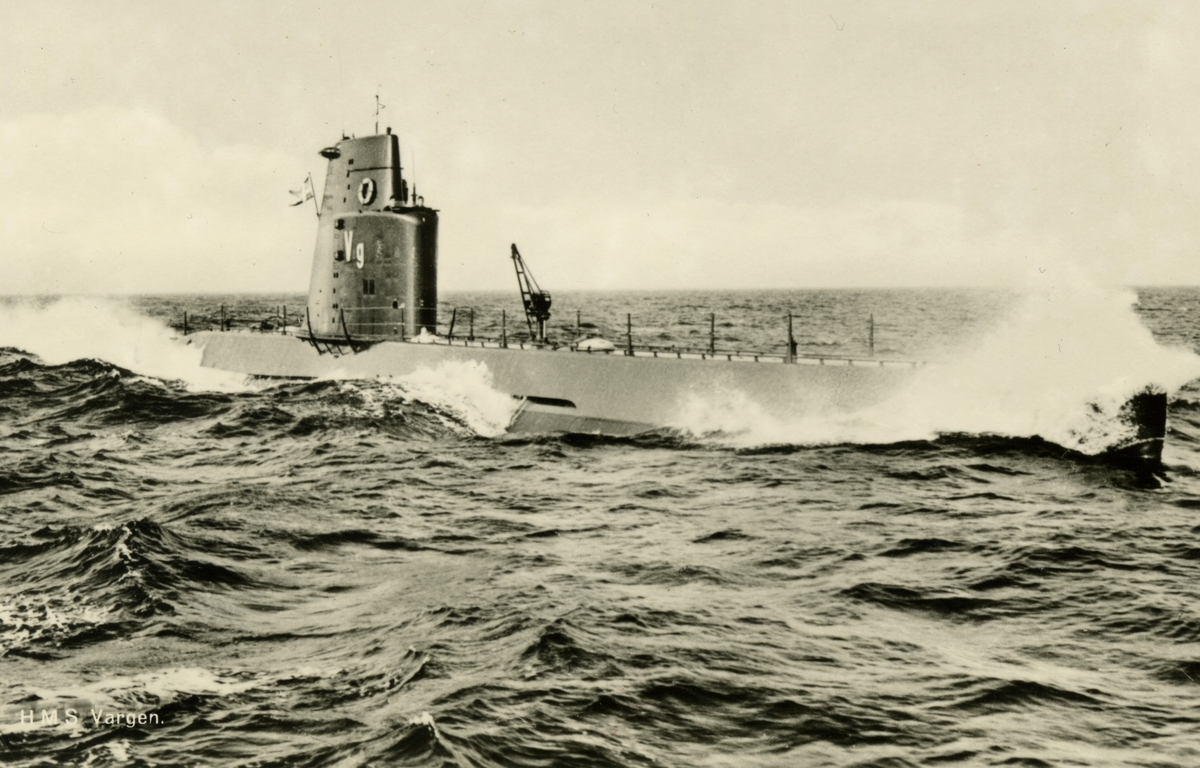

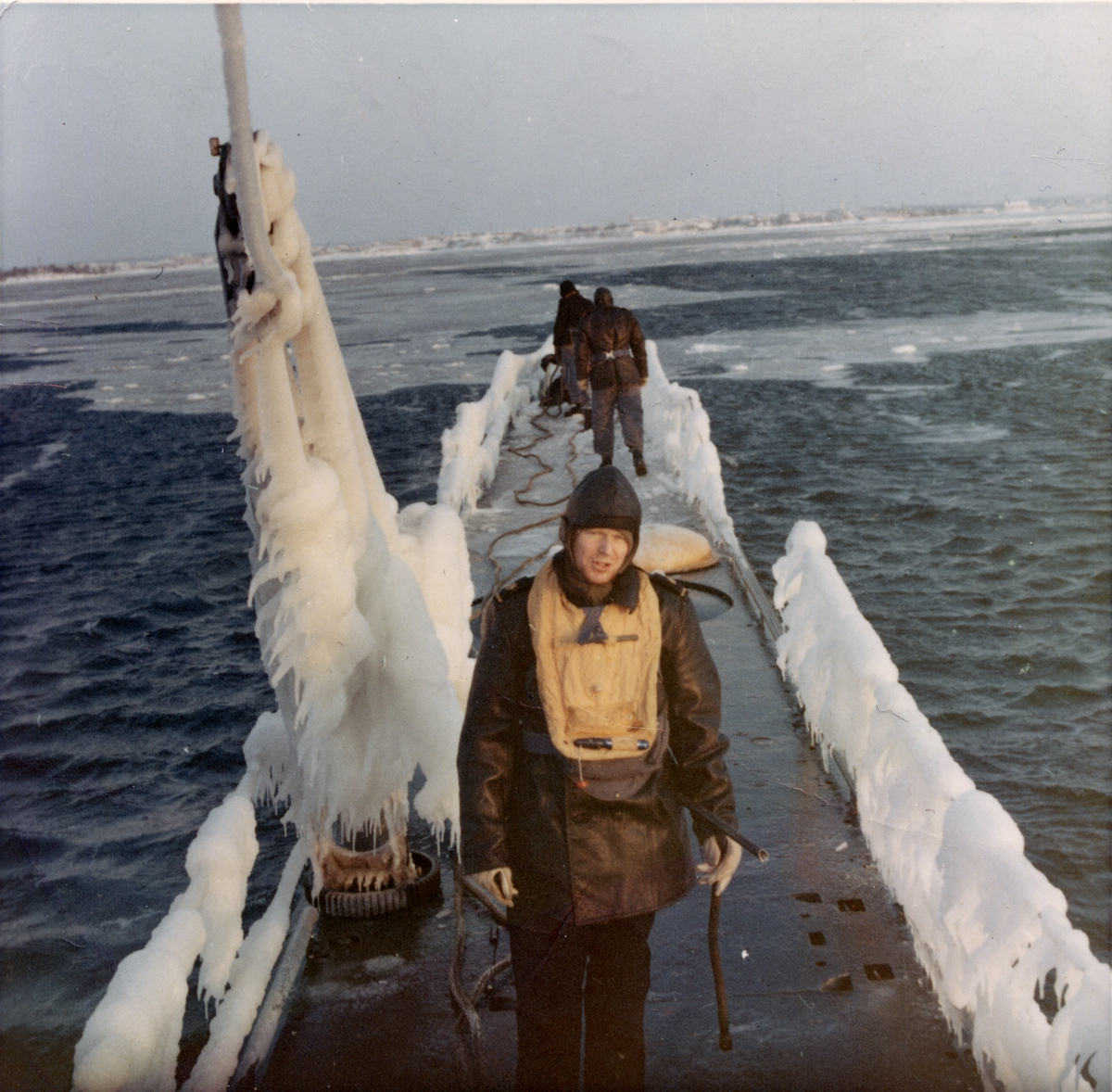
HSwMS Vargen in 1967

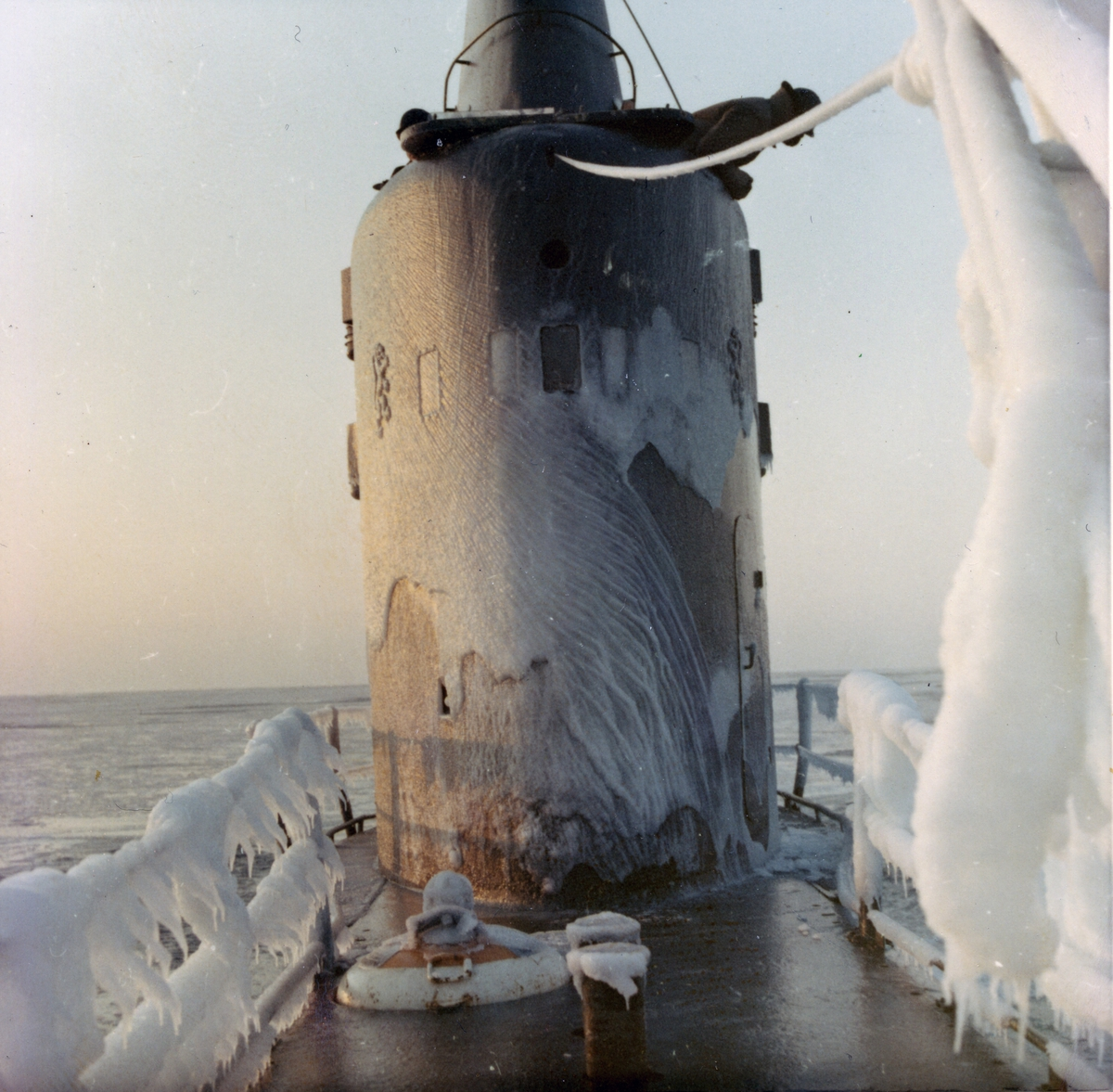
