= Huvudskär =

Swedish archipelago and lighthouse

Huvudskär lighthouse Huvudskär
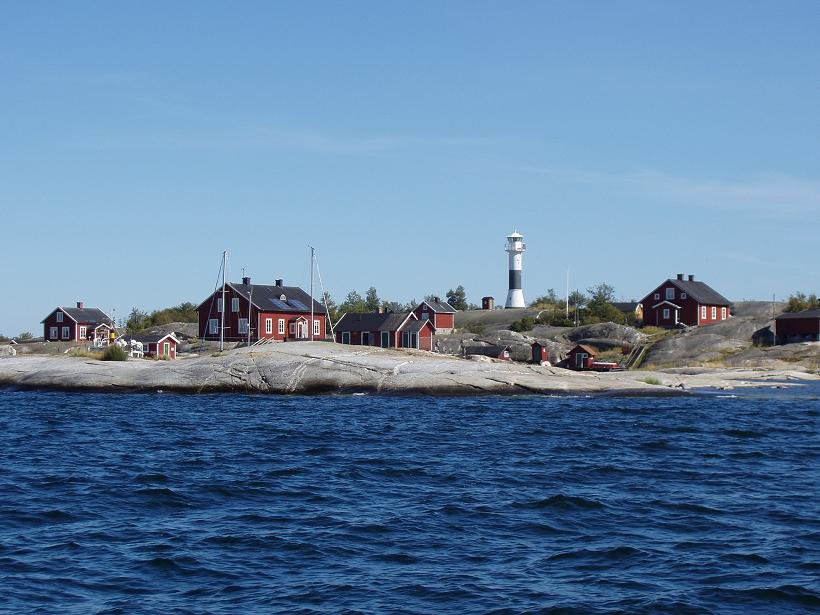
- Location: Ålandsskär; Huvudskär archipelago, east of Dalarö; Sweden
- Coordinates: 58.963081°N 18.568182°E

Tower
- Constructed: 1882 (first)
- Foundation: concrete
- Construction: concrete tower
- Automated: 1931
- Height: 16 metres (52 ft)
- Shape: tapered cylindrical tower with balcony and lantern
- Markings: white tower with one black band
- Power source: acetylene, solar cell panel
- Operator: Swedish Maritime Administration (Sjöfartsverket)

Light
- First lit: 1931 (current)
- Focal height: 26 metres (85 ft)
- Lens: 4th order Fresnel lens (original), 3rd order lens (current)
- Range: 12 nautical miles (22 km; 14 mi)
- Characteristic: Iso W 8s.
- Sweden no.: SV-2855

Huvudskär is a Swedish archipelago, consisting of about 200 rocks and islands, and a lighthouse. It is located in the Baltic Sea, in the southern part of the Stockholm archipelago. For many hundred years this area was very important for fishermen. Huvudskär is a very popular destination for sea travellers and tourists.

== The lighthouse ==
In 1882 the first lighthouse was lit. This was placed on top of a keepers house made of wood. The lantern came from the deactivated lighthouse on Korsö. The light was a kerosene lamp. In 1931, the now standing tower was built and both the lantern and keepers house were removed. The new tower first ran on acetylene gas, and later was electrified. In 1992, solar power was installed to the lighthouse. It is owned and remote-controlled by the Swedish Maritime Administration.

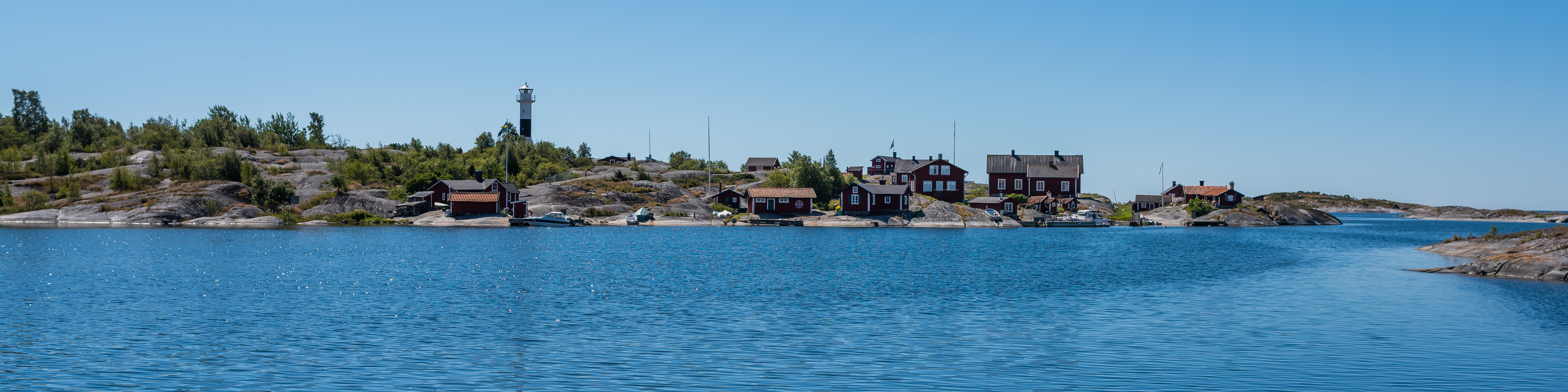
Huvudskär 2016
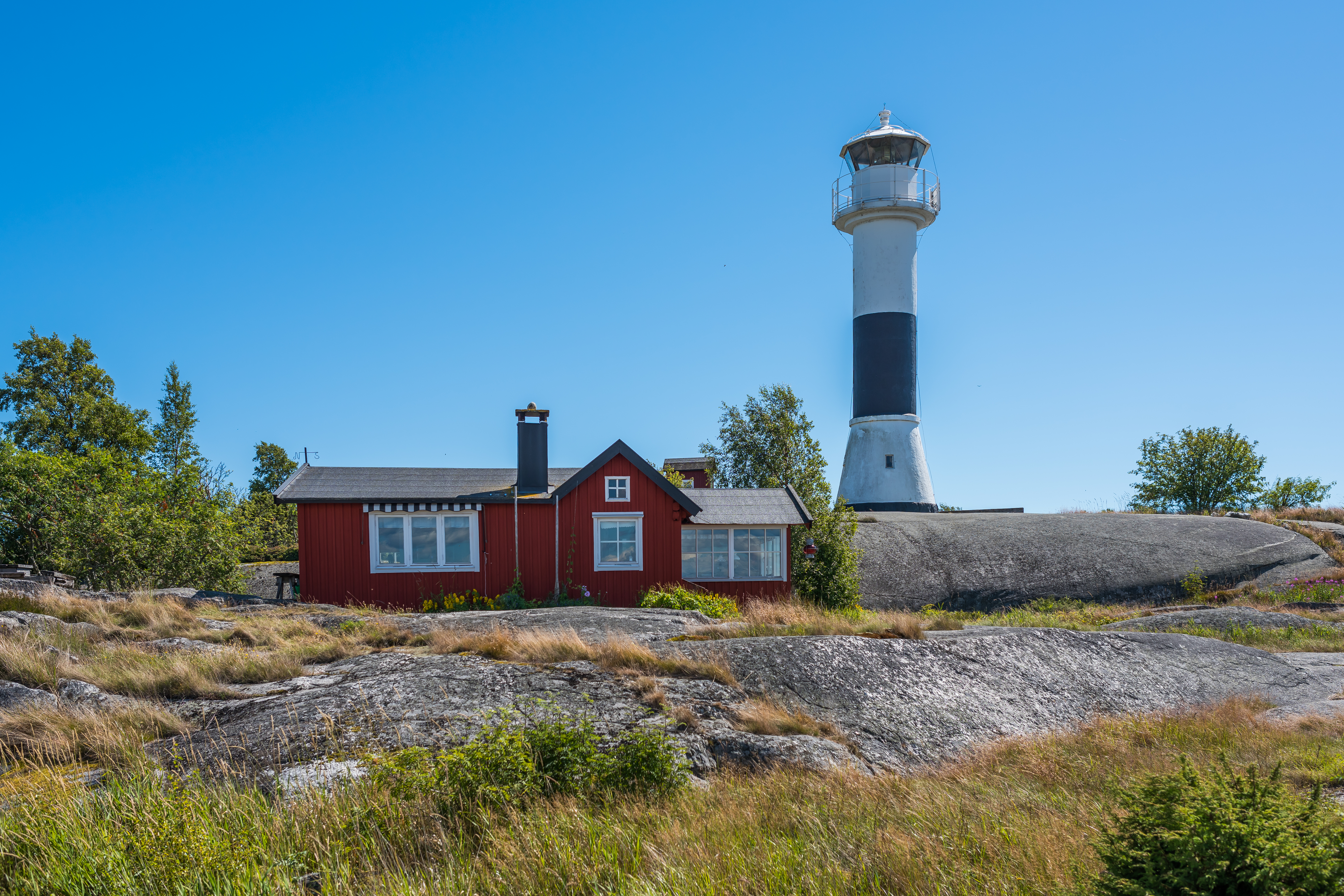

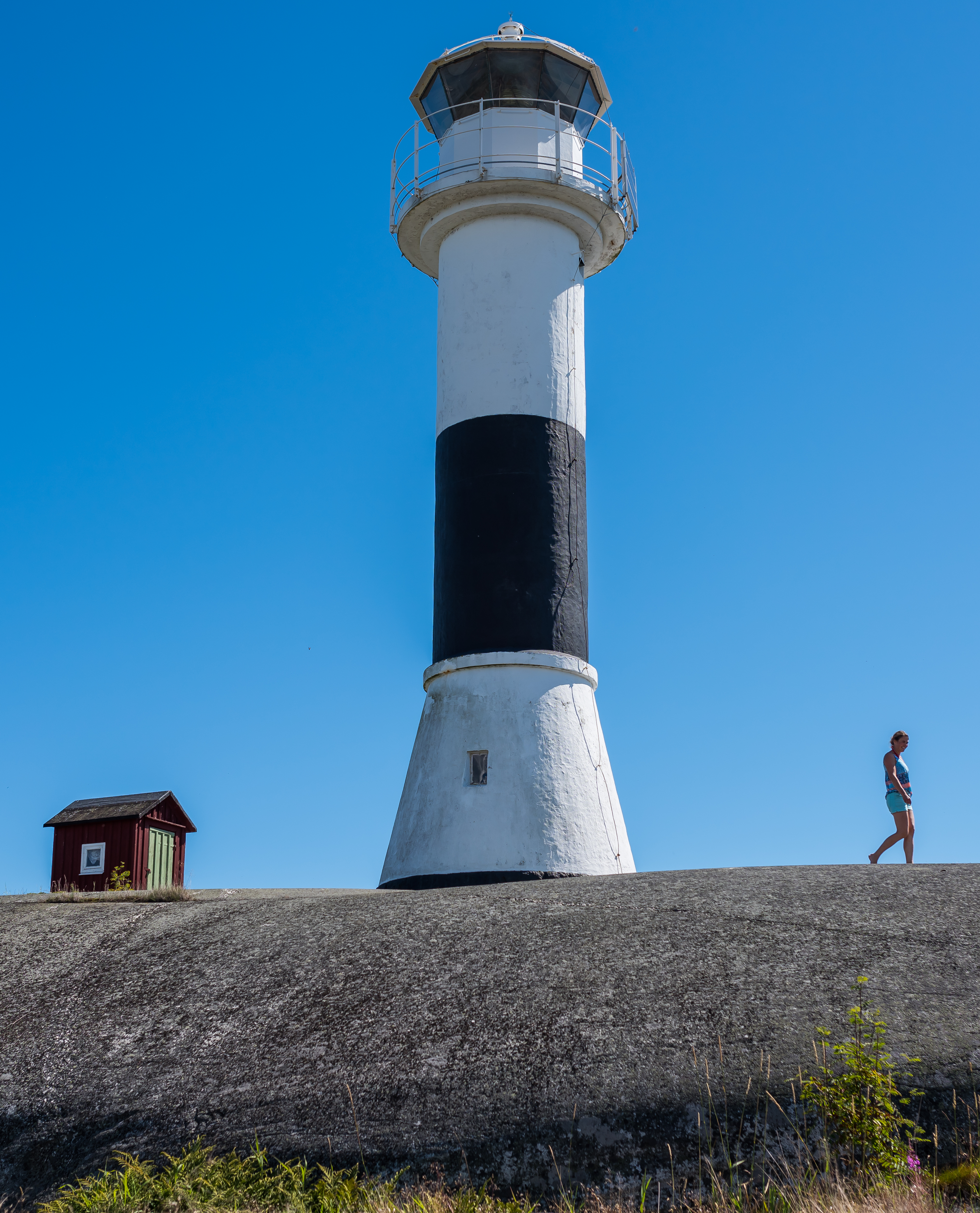

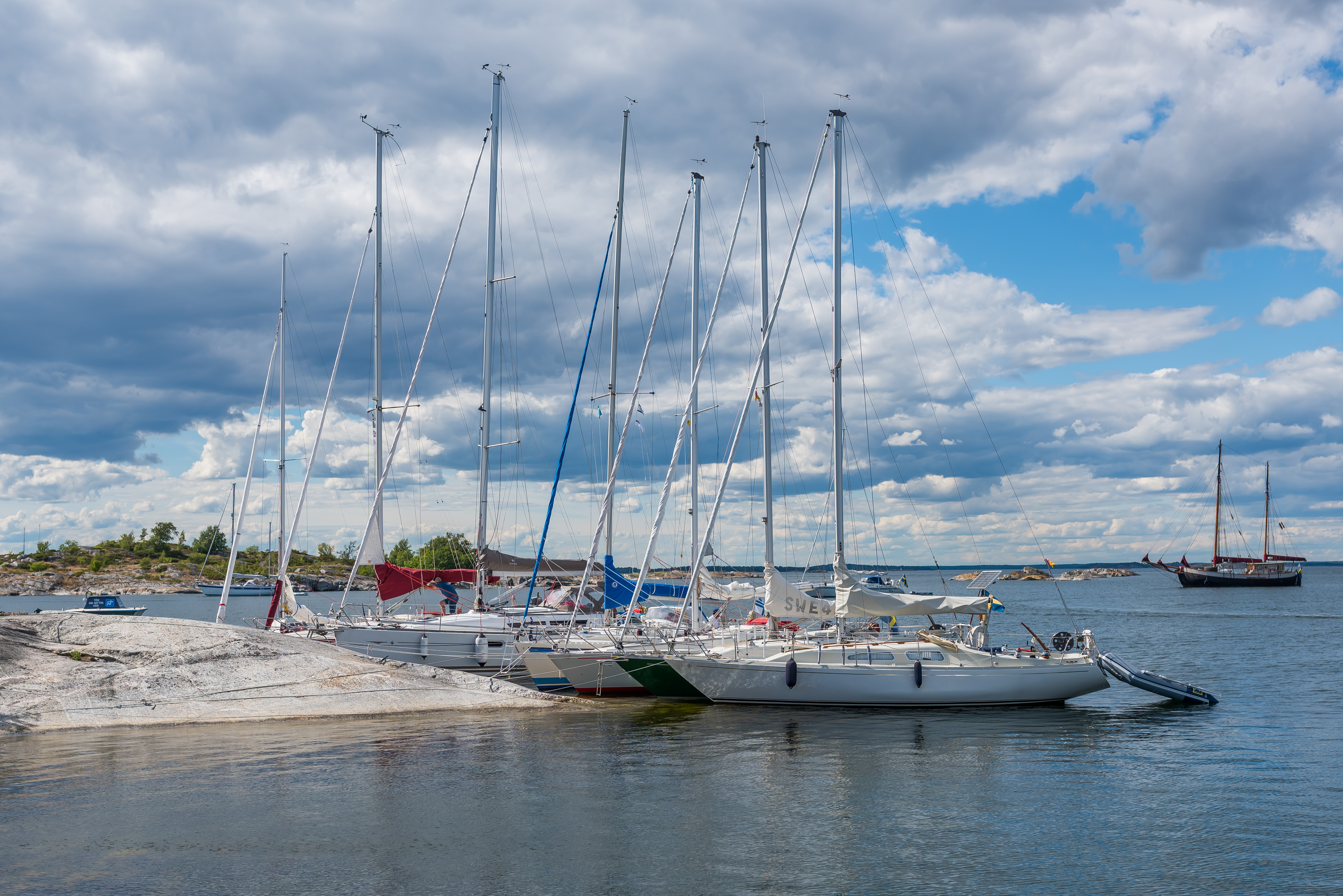

== See also ==
- List of lighthouses and lightvessels in Sweden
