= Draken-class submarine (1960) =

Swedish Navy submarine class

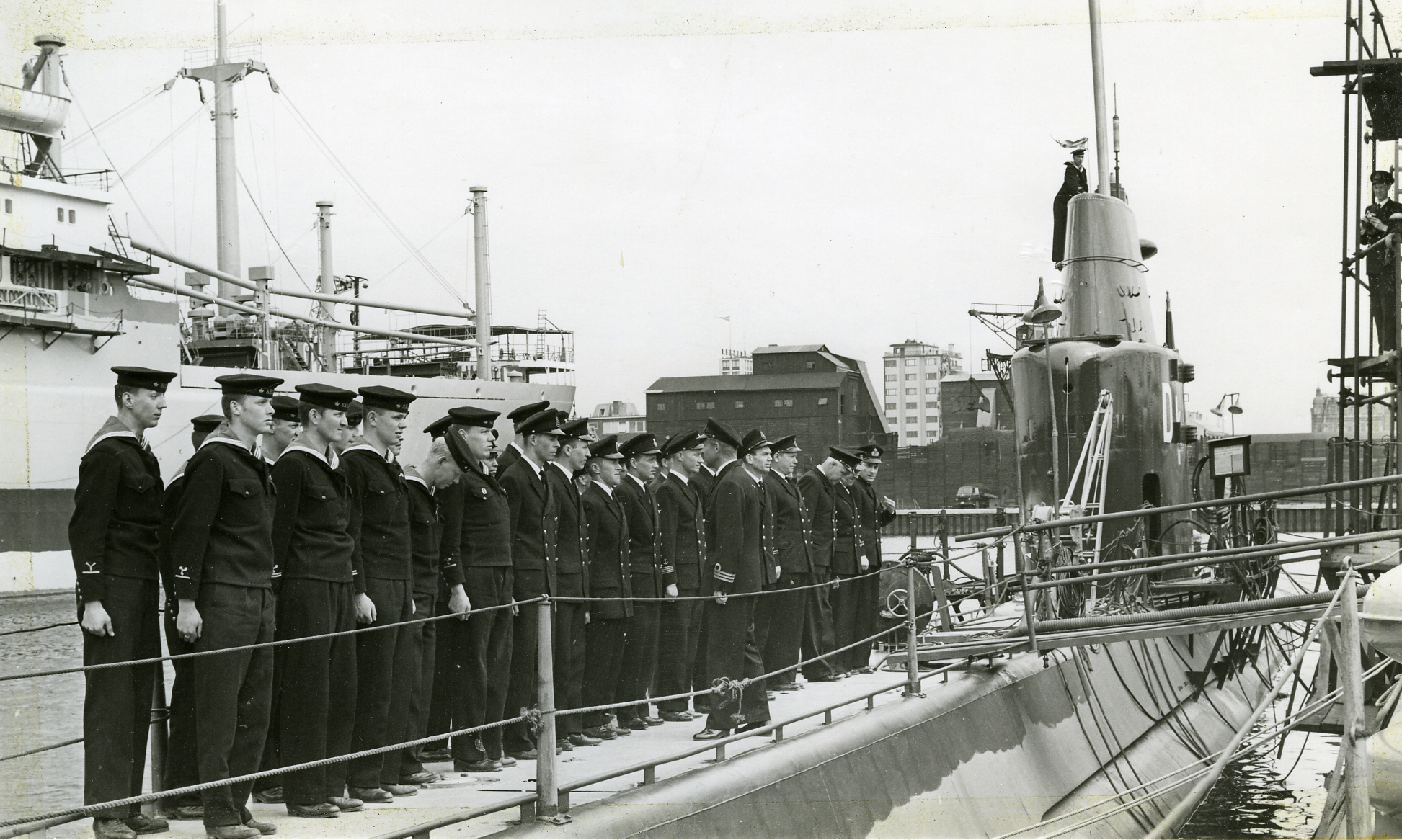
- HSwMS Draken in 1962

Class overview
- Builders: Kockums
- Operators: Swedish Navy
- Preceded by: Hajen class
- Succeeded by: Sjöormen class
- Built: 1957–1962
- In commission: 1962–1988
- Planned: 6
- Completed: 6
- Retired: 6
- Preserved: 1

General characteristics
- Type: Submarine
- Displacement: 770 t (760 long tons) (Surfaced); 950 t (930 long tons) (Submerged)
- Length: 69.3 m (227 ft 4 in)
- Beam: 5.1 m (16 ft 9 in)
- Draught: 5.3 m (17 ft 5 in)
- Propulsion: 1 shaft diesel-electric; 2 Pielstick diesel engines 1,660 hp (1,240 kW); 2 ASEA electric motors
- Speed: 17 knots (31 km/h; 20 mph) surfaced; 22 knots (41 km/h; 25 mph) submerged
- Complement: 36
- Armament: 4 × 533 mm (21.0 in) bow torpedo tubes; 12 torpedoes

The Draken class was a submarine class built for the Swedish Navy from 1960 to 1962. A total of six submarines were delivered. Four of the boats were modernised in 1981–1982. The design was a modified version of the Hajen class with only one shaft with a larger 5-bladed propeller for improved underwater performance and reduced noise. Draken, Vargen, Nordkaparen and Springaren were ordered from Kockums. Gripen and Delfinen were from Karlskrona. These boats were decommissioned 1988–1990 and were succeeded by the Sjöormen and Näcken-class submarines.

One submarine, HSwMS Nordkaparen, was preserved and can be seen at the Maritiman in Gothenburg.

== See also ==
Equivalent submarines of the same era

- Daphné class
- Sutjeska class
- Hayashio class
