= Stumholmen =

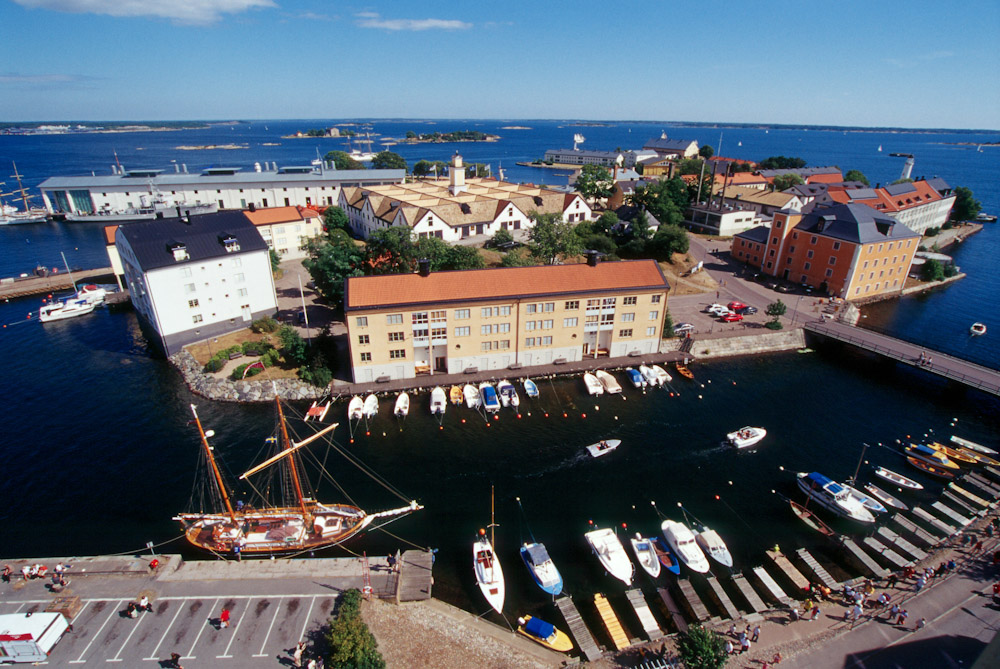
- Stumholmen from the west

- Location within Sweden
- Coordinates: 56°09′36″N 15°35′52″E
- Country: Sweden
- Province: Blekinge
- County: Blekinge County
- Municipality: Karlskrona Municipality

Population
  - Total: 277
- Time zone: UTC+1 (CET)
  - Summer (DST): UTC+2 (CEST)

Stumholmen is a small island to the east of Trossö in Karlskrona, Sweden. It is connected to the center of Karlskrona by the Bastionsgatan bridge. Formerly the property of the Navy, today it houses the National Naval Museum (Marinmuseum), one of Sweden's oldest founded in 1752, the Hyper Island educational complex, and several other historic buildings. The unusual Slup- och barkass- skjulet (Sloop and Longboat Shed) is noted for its remarkable roof while buildings on Laboratorieholmen once served as an isolation hospital when the town was struck with disease. Comprehensive restoration and renovation work has been undertaken since the 1990s, providing a variety of interesting sights for tourists as well as residential accommodation for senior citizens. Since 1998, the Naval City of Karlskrona, of which Stumholmen is a key component, has been a UNESCO World Heritage Site.

== History ==
In 1683, under King Karl XI, fortification plans were drawn up, providing workshops and stores for shipbuilding and provisioning. In 1782, Fredric Henric af Chapman was charged by King Gustav III to modernize shipbuilding methods in order to create a large new fleet. Chapman's success in building 10 ships of the line and 10 frigates in just three years brought a new period of prosperity. Over the years, there have been bakers, distillers, brewers, butchers, a textiles factory and, as both water and provisions were generally stored in barrels, a coopers’ workshop on the island. Today as a result of building dikes and landfill pads between Stumholmen and the islands of Laboratorieholmen and Bastion Kungshall, the area is seen as a single island. There are military buildings from the early 18th century, some designed by the commander in chief of the naval base, Carl August Ehrensvärd, who had taken an interest in Greek and Roman architecture. The navy yard continued to be expanded until the 1950s. Stumholmen was a great military workplace until the 1970s but is now a civilian area. As a result of an architectural competition, preservation work on 17 buildings was undertaken in the 1990s adhering to the general prínciple of "a quality conscious conversion of an historic environment". Development of residential facilities has provided over 150 apartments on the island, all reserved for rental or purchase by senior citizens. Occupants are offered car parking space as well as a boat space nearby. In 1998, the Naval city of Karlskrona became a UNESCO World Heritage Site.

== Landmarks ==
Stumholmen has several attractions, especially the Naval Museum which opened in 1997 with collections and exhibitions related to the Navy and the shipyard. There is also an operational Coast Guard center and a management and training center known as Hyper Island. As a result of an architecture competition, Stumholmen and its buildings were specially preserved in the 1990s.

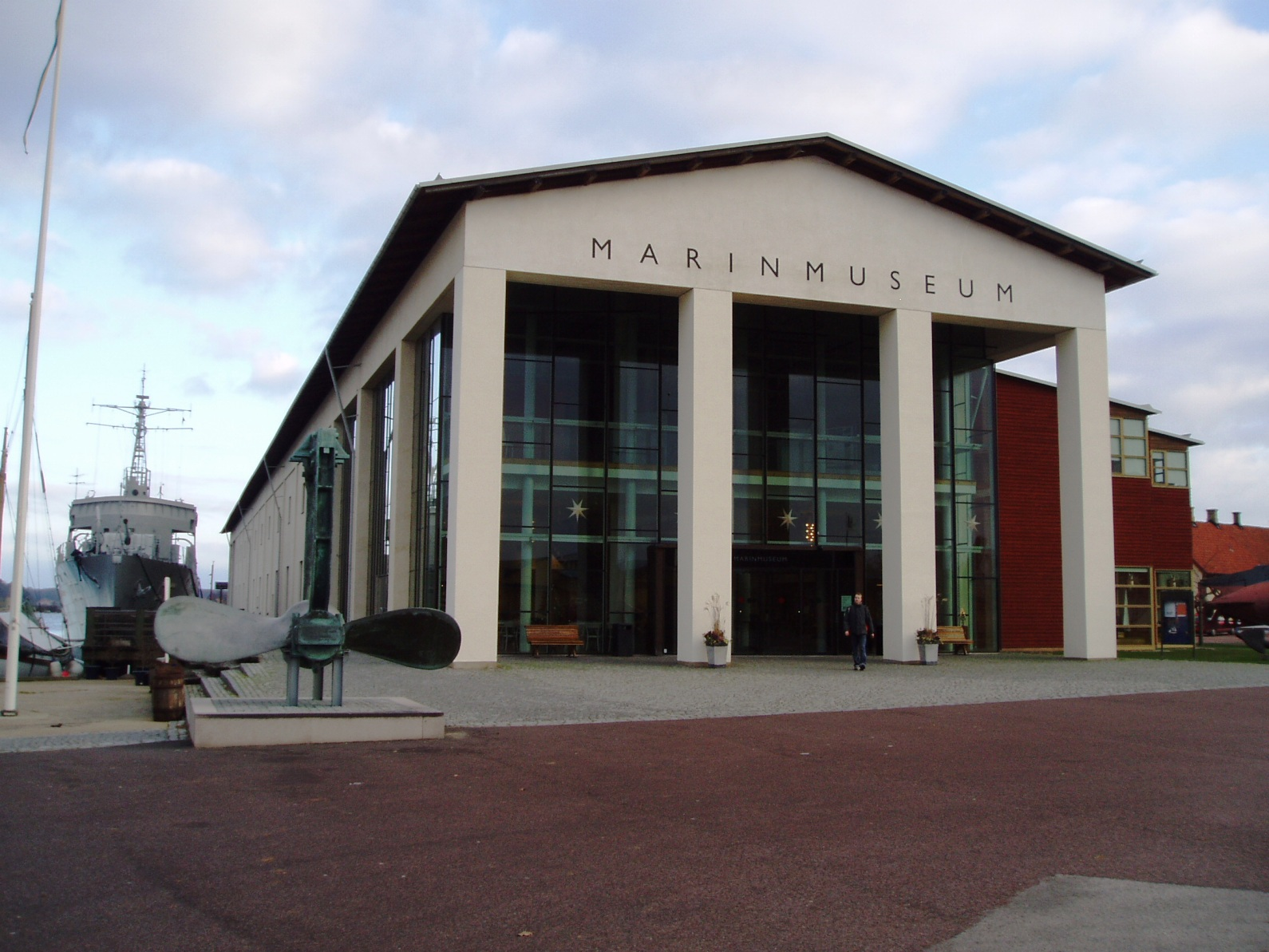
Naval Museum

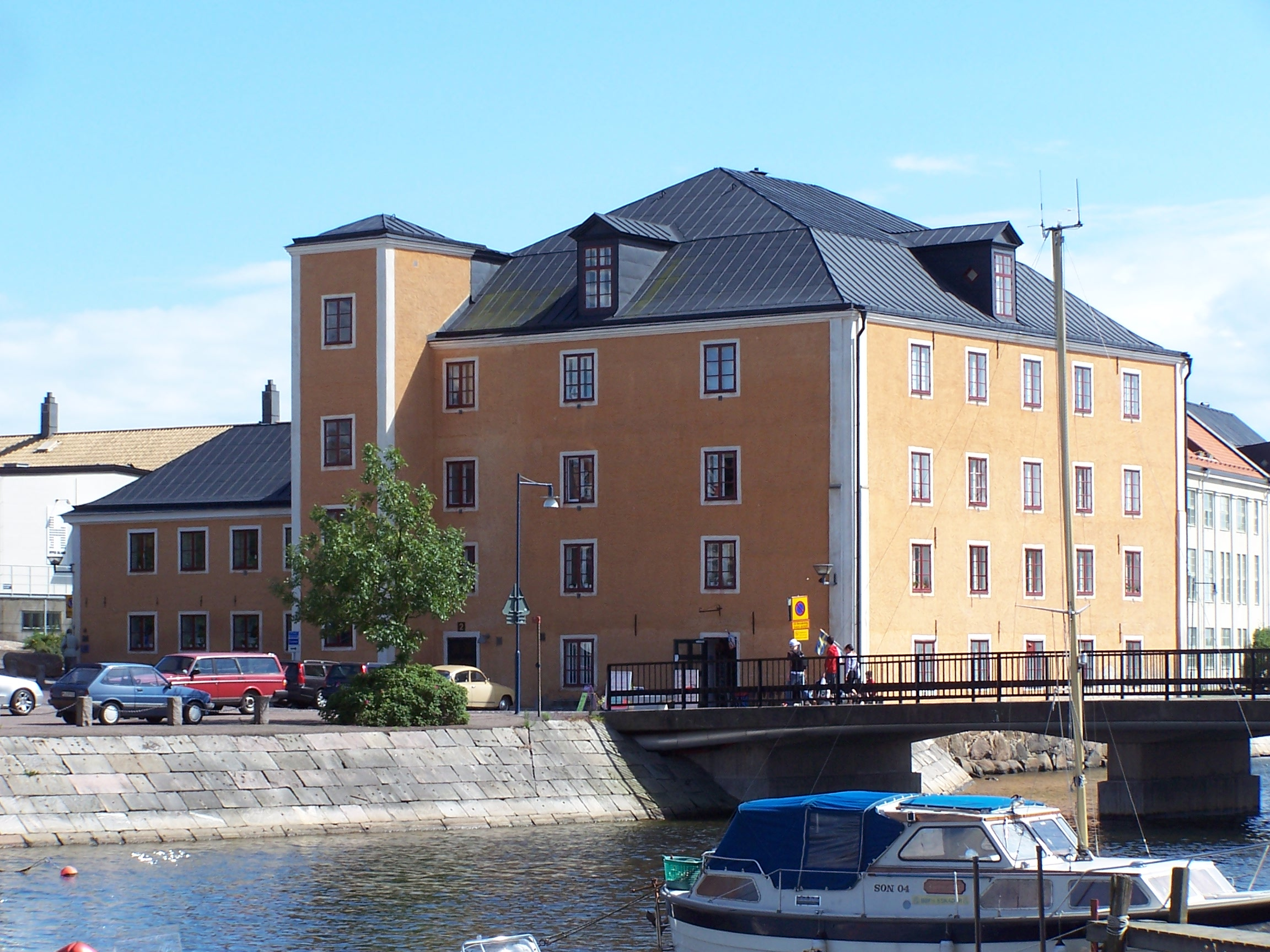
Crown Bakery

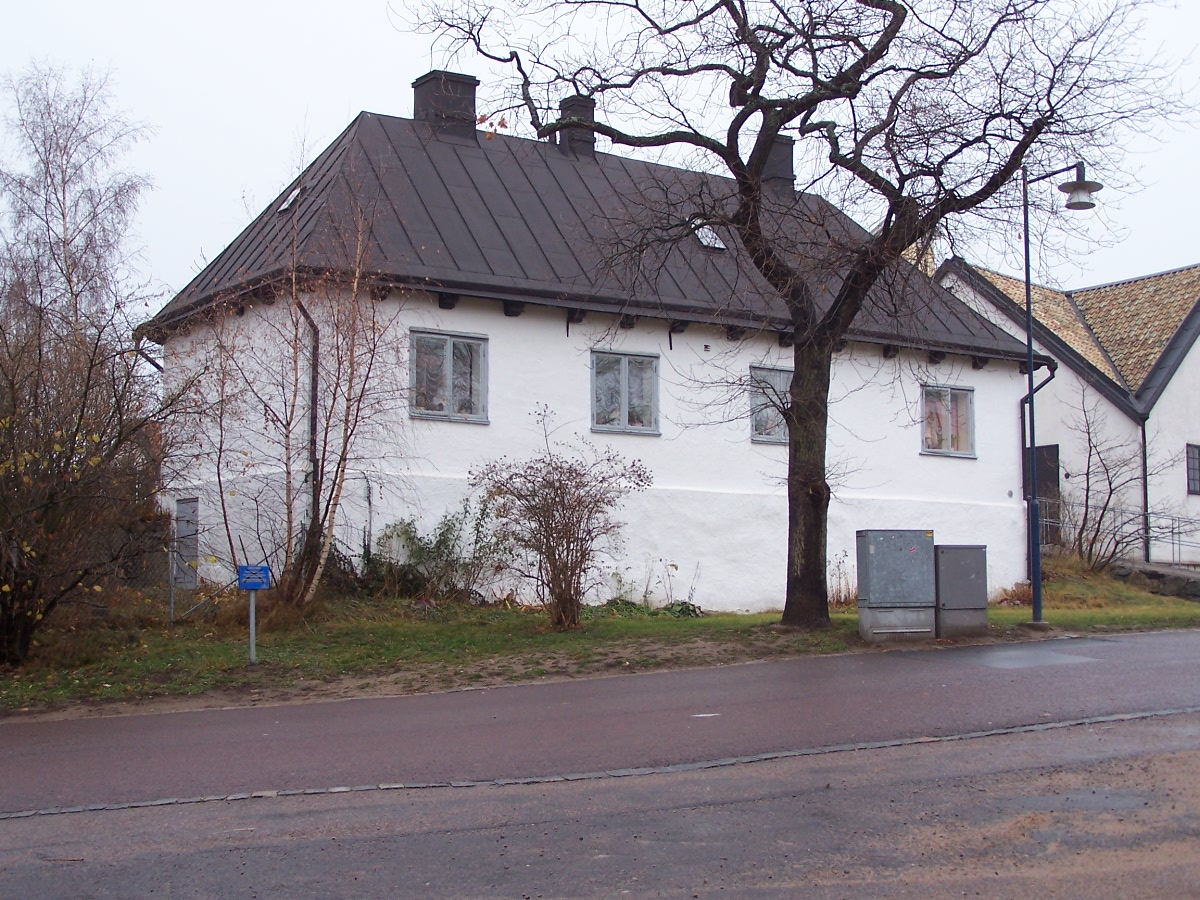
Corps de Garde

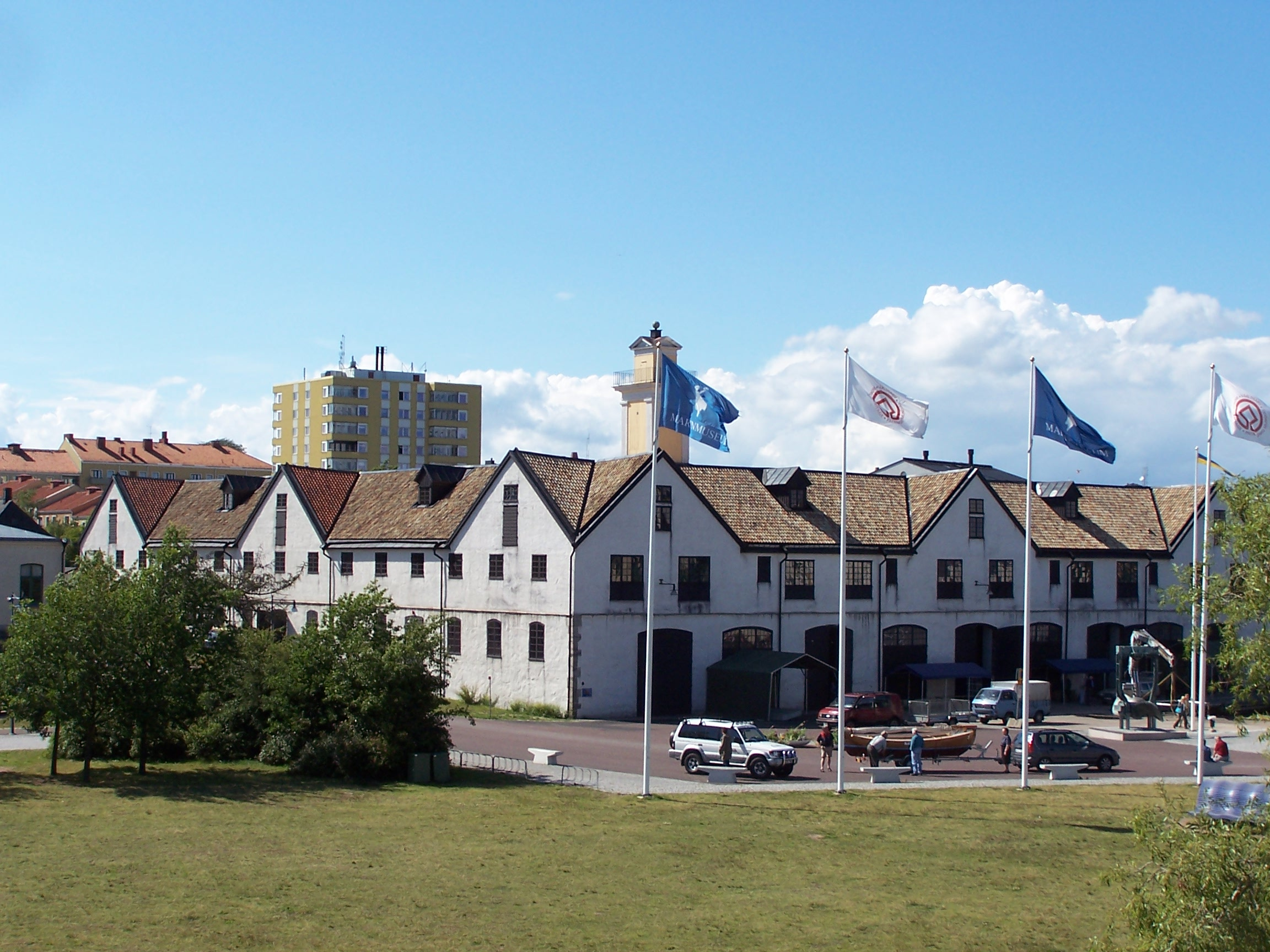
Sloop and Longboat Shed

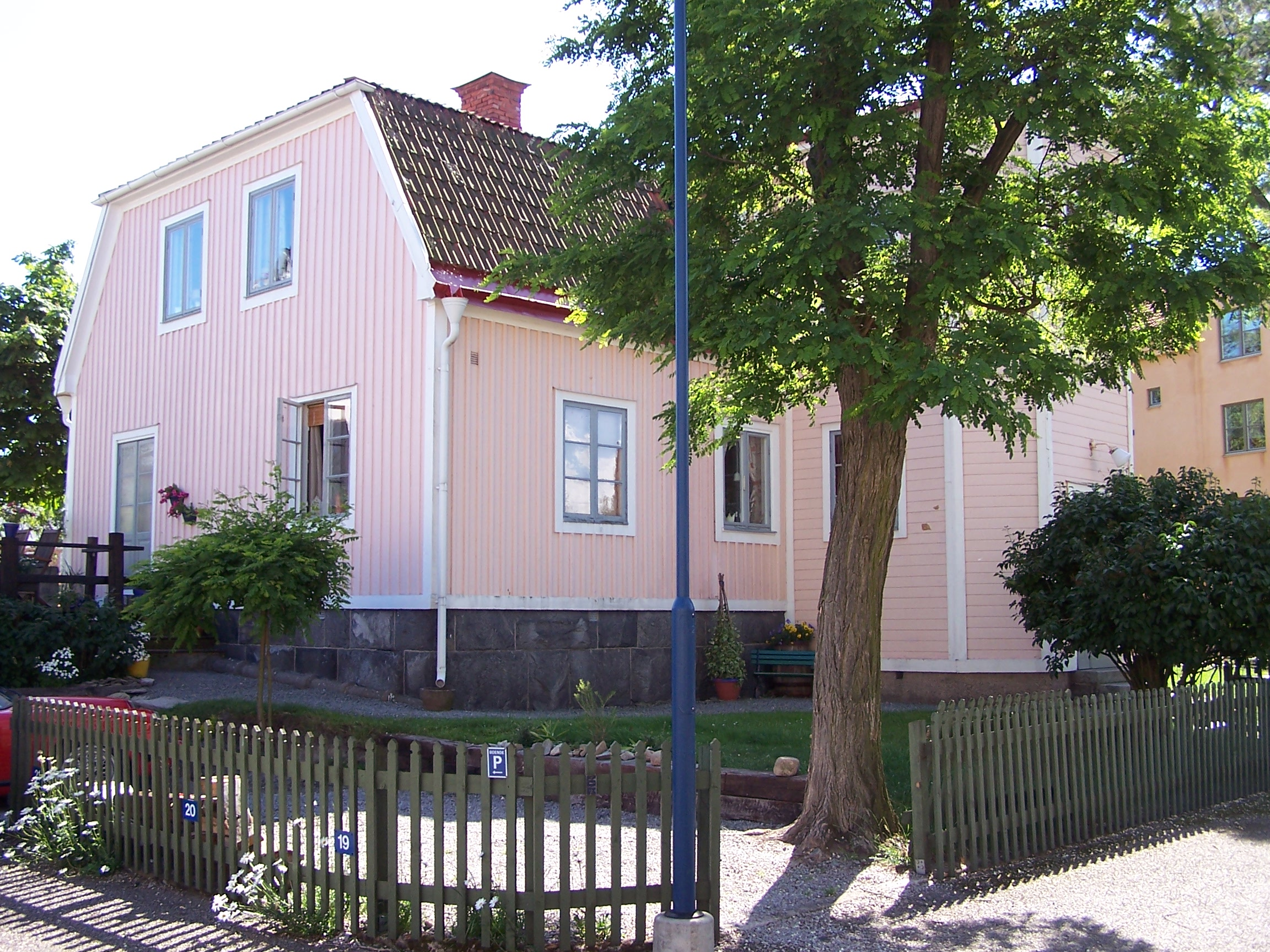
Western Villa (Hvite krog)

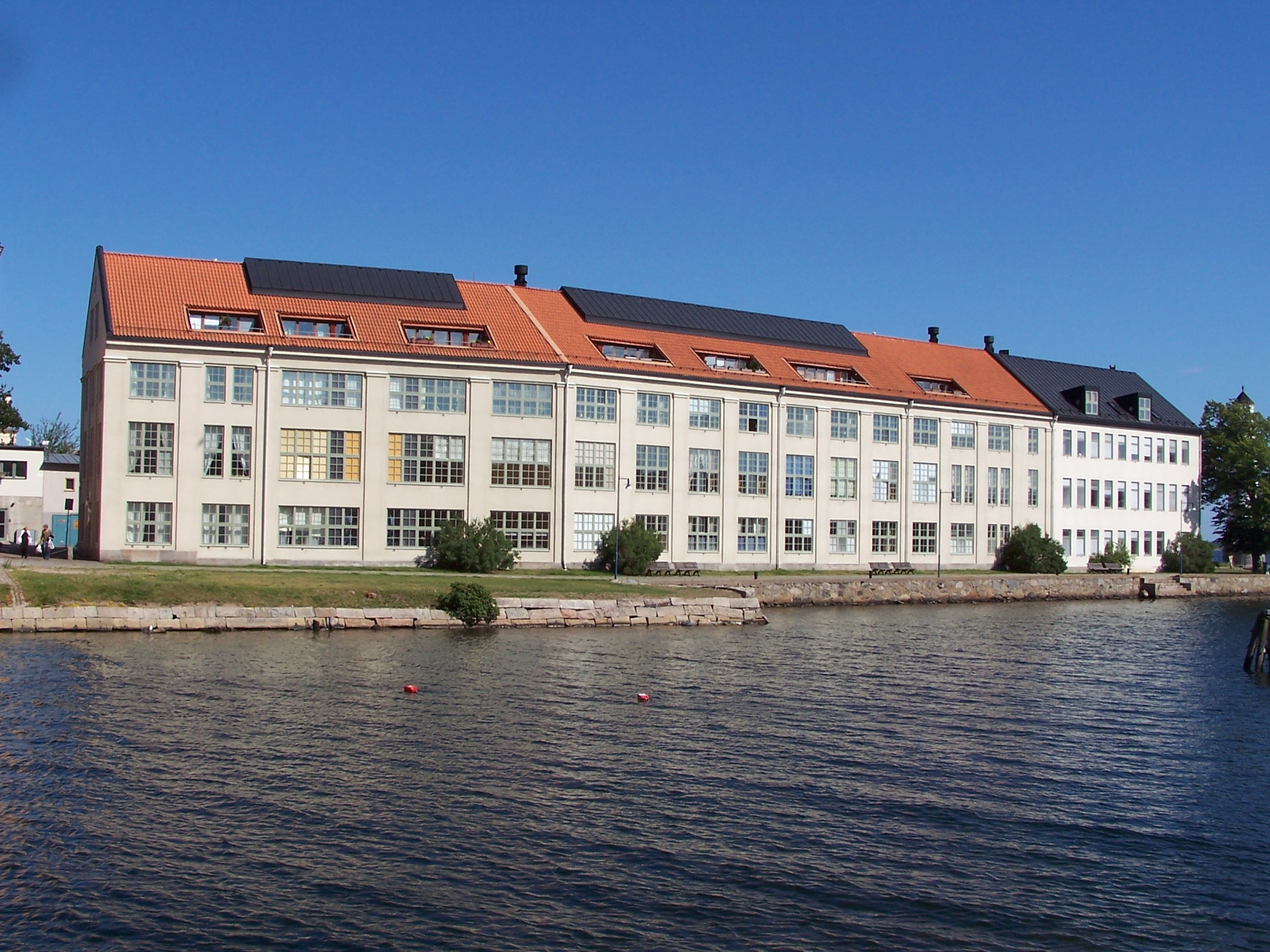
Clothing Manufactory

=== Naval Museum ===
The Naval Museum in Karlskrona is a state museum dedicated to Swedish naval defense, providing background on the history of the Swedish Navy. The foundations of the museum were laid in 1752 when King Adolf Frederick established the Navy's model chamber with artifacts representing the various vessels. From 1953 to 1997, the Naval Museum was located in the former Ship Goss Barracks outside the naval harbor. Since June 1997, it has been on the island of Stumholmen. The classic main facade is designed to harmonize with the 18th century Sloop and Longboat Shed. The museum projects like a pier out into the sea. It includes an underwater observation tunnel, a naval warfare gallery, a full-scale reconstruction of the gun-deck of the Dristigheten and an exhibition of ship's figureheads, most of which were carved by the 18th-century sculptor Johan Törnström. The Naval Museum is one of the National Maritime Museums together with Vasa Museum and the Maritime Museum in Stockholm.

=== Crown Bakery ===
The three-storey Crown Bakery was built during the 1730s. Hardtack biscuits were baked for long voyages and soft anchor bread for those on shore duty. Flour boats with rye flour from Lyckaby Crown Mill were able to moor next to the bakery which is seen as an early example of industrial production. On the ground floor there were eight ovens, the first floor housed a kiln while the second floor was used for storing bread and flour. The facility was extended around 1908 with an additional floor and was used as a clothing store. In the 1990s, it was converted into apartments but the facade has been preserved.

=== Corps de Garde ===
A guardhouse stands at the end of the bridge over to the island. Built in 1821–1826 in the Neoclassical style, the well-preserved stone building with a deeply pitched roof is probably the oldest guardhouse in Sweden. It is the only building in the Naval Base which faces towards the town itself. A description from 1781 details the interior as consisting of an entrance hall, a prison cell, a non-commissioned officers' room, a guard room and a room for fire equipment. The guardhouse was used to protect the naval base from unauthorised entry.

=== Sloop and Longboat Shed ===
The Sloop and Longboat Shed is one of Karlskrona's most remarkable buildings. It was built in the 1780s to store the Navy's smaller boats during the winter. The building is topped by 10 interconnected saddle-backed roofs allowing rainwater from 16 cavities to run into collection barrels. It now forms part of the Naval Museum.

=== Western Villa (Hvite krog) ===
The building on the left after the bridge is now known as the Western Villa. It was built in the 18th century on Wämö where it was originally a one-storey building housing the Hvite krog or White Tavern. Around 1908, it was moved to Stumholmen and converted into a two-storey apartment building.

=== The Clothing Manufactory ===
The manufactury was built in 1921 and housed the Navy's clothing shop, which became a model for similar facilities in other European countries. On the ground floor, almost 100 pairs of shoes were made each day while cutters, tailors and seamstresses produced naval uniforms on the first floor. It is an example of industrial architecture from the 1920s with clear classical features and now includes residential apartments.

=== Ratings Barracks ===
The Båtsmanskasernen (Ratings Barracks) was built in 1847 as quarters for about 500 navy conscripts. On each floor there are large, open dormitories accommodating 250 men in hammocks. Inside, the building gives the feel of a real ship. The floor is rounded like a deck and once had scuppers. The walls are panelled in oak. The building's centerline consists of mast-like columns. After serving as a barracks for some ten years, the building became a storage house. Today, the former barracks provides teaching facilities for the Hyper Island design and management school.

=== Bakery Living Quarters ===
One of Karlskrona's oldest buildings, the Bageribostället (Bakery Living Quarters), was built in the late 1600s and was originally an artillery workshop. After the artillery works were moved to Trossö Island in the 18th century, the building was used to accommodate crews from the bakery ships. When the new Crown Bakery was opened in 1863, accommodation was needed for the staff. J. T. Byström, the architect who had designed the bakery, extended the building in the Empire style, completing the work in 1866. It was later used as an official residence and today contains apartments.

=== Crown Prison ===
Kronohäkte (the Crown Prison) built in 1910–1911 was designed by F. Bothén according to the Philadelphia Model approach with open floors to supervision easier. It was developed during the first half of the 1800s with one-man cells along the walls around a central atrium. Behind the jail, there were fenced exercise areas and a surveillance tower. Kronohäkte was a detention center until the 1970s. Today it offers teaching facilities for the Hyper Island Business Management and Digital Media school which was founded in 1996 (see below).

=== Cholera and Quarantine Hospital ===
The disinfection building, hospital pavilion and fumigation shed are located on Laboratorieholmen which was once a separate island used as the site of a cannon foundry. After the 1788–1790 campaign against Russia, the returning fleet brought ship's fever, a form of typhus, to the city causing some 10,000 to lose their lives. A temporary hospital was built on Laboratorieholmen. Later it became a permanent building, one of Sweden's first cholera and quarantine hospitals. The complex includes a Disinfecting House from 1889 with a mortuary and cremation furnace as well as a Fumigation Building (the Kokhus) from 1875.

=== Naval aviation hangars ===
Stumholmen was a seaplane base from 1914 to 1949. Hangars No. 3 was built in 1926 for the Swedish Naval Air Service. They are among the last surviving wooden hangars in the country. Hangar No. 4 from 1929 has a double-arched roof and was used for the Swedish Air Force. In front of the hangars there are slipways of wood and concrete which were used for launching and hauling the aircraft in from the sea. Navy seaplanes were located on Stumholmen from 1914 to 1949.

=== Coopers' Storehouse ===
Tunnebodsmagasinet (the Coopers' Storehouse) was built in 1718 to store vasts numbers of barrels with water and provisions for the Navy. Today it is the Operational Headquarters of the Swedish Coast Guard.

=== Kungshall Bastion ===
Built in the mid-1680s, the bastion was used as a fortification for almost a century. In the 1790s, it was rebuilt as a slaughterhouse and for the storage of meat and groceries. It is now used by Blekinge Museum for storing artefacts. The bastion guns form one of Sweden's three permanent batteries, and are still used for firing ceremonial salutes.

== Companies on Stumholmen ==
In addition to the historic and residential attractions of Stumholmen, there are also three private companies: Hyper Island, an educational company located in the old military prison, was founded in 1996 by Jonathan Briggs, David Erixon and Lars Lundh. With support from the Swedish Ministry of Education, the school offers vocational courses in Digital Media, Management and Leadership based on "learn by doing" principles. With a staff of ten, there are up to 180 students per year. SITAC (Swedish Institute for Technical Approval in Construction), a subsidiary the SP Technical Research Institute of Sweden issues European Technical Approvals (ETA) for construction products and personal skills in the construction industry. The company's head office is located on the island. Founded in 1999, the Nurse Partner Group, including Nurse Partner and Doc Partner, is a recruitment and staffing agency focusing on health care. Although headquartered on Stumholmen, the organization also has offices in Oslo and Copenhagen.

== Gallery ==
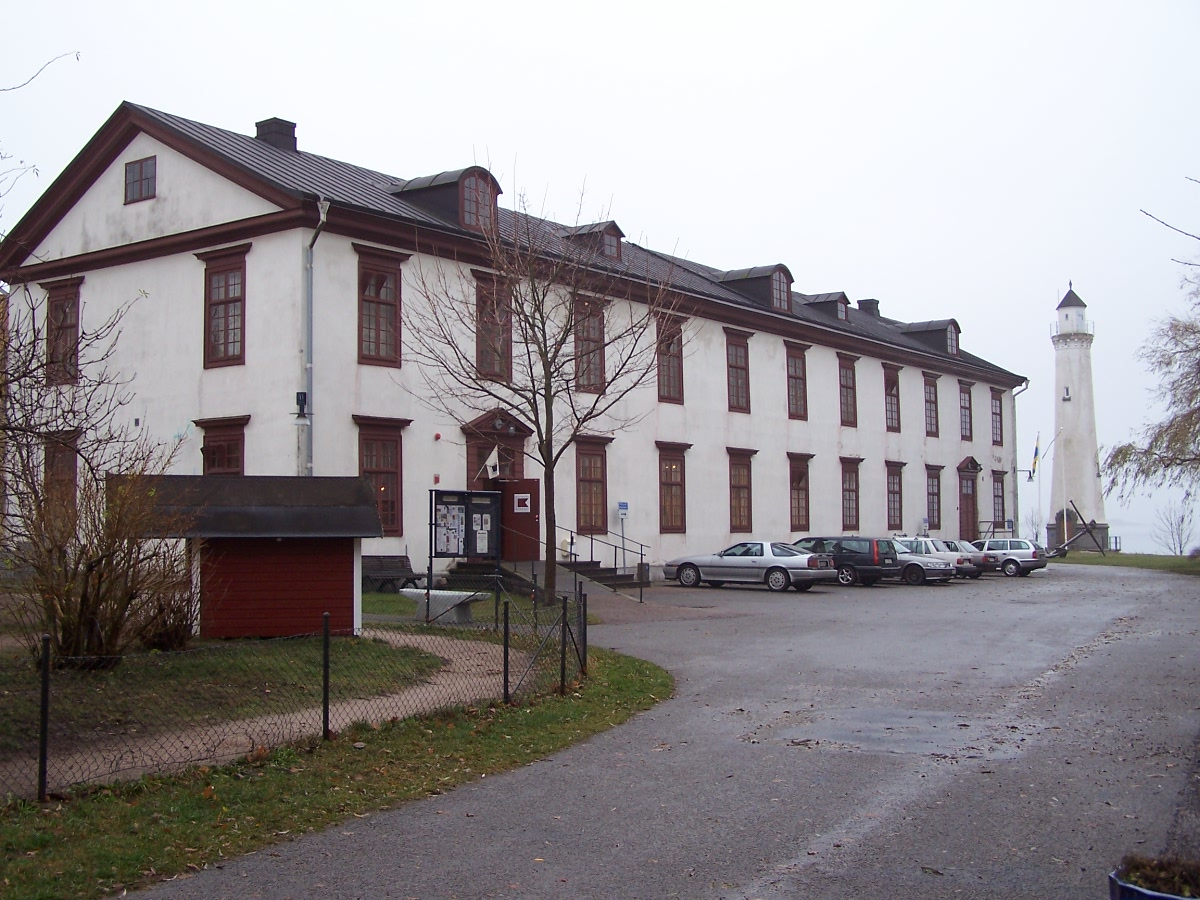
Ratings Barracks

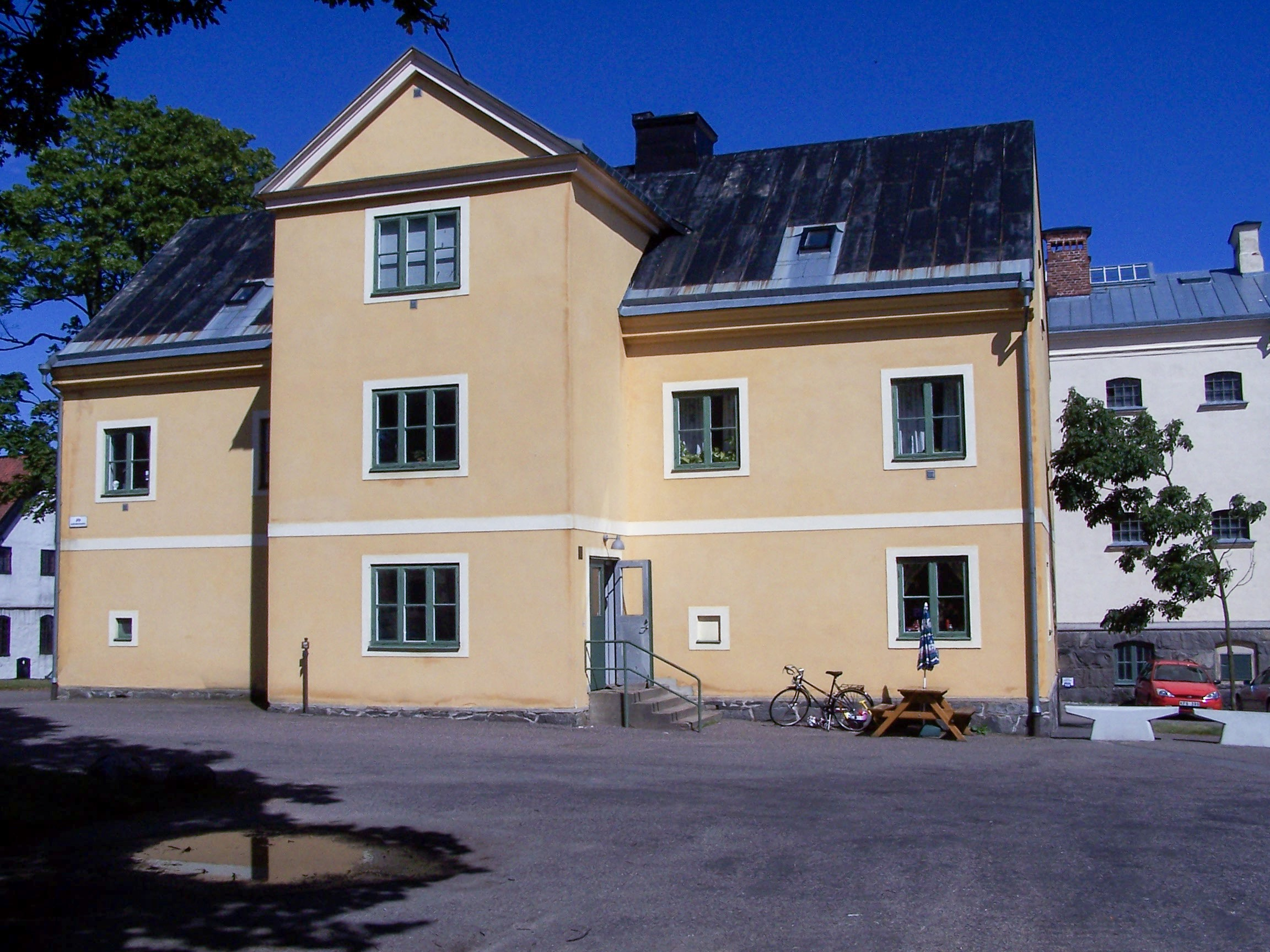
Bakery Living Quarters

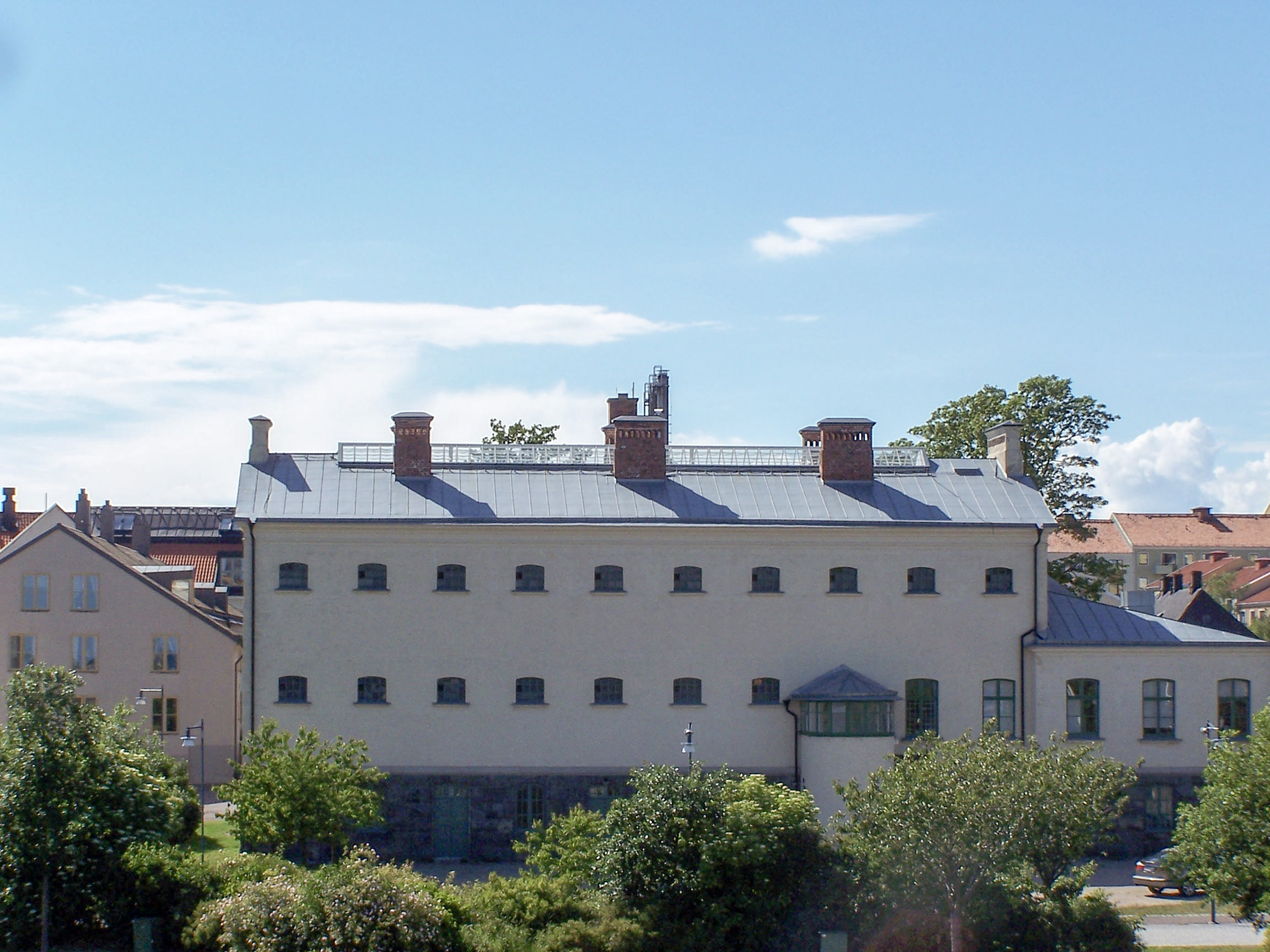
Crown Prison

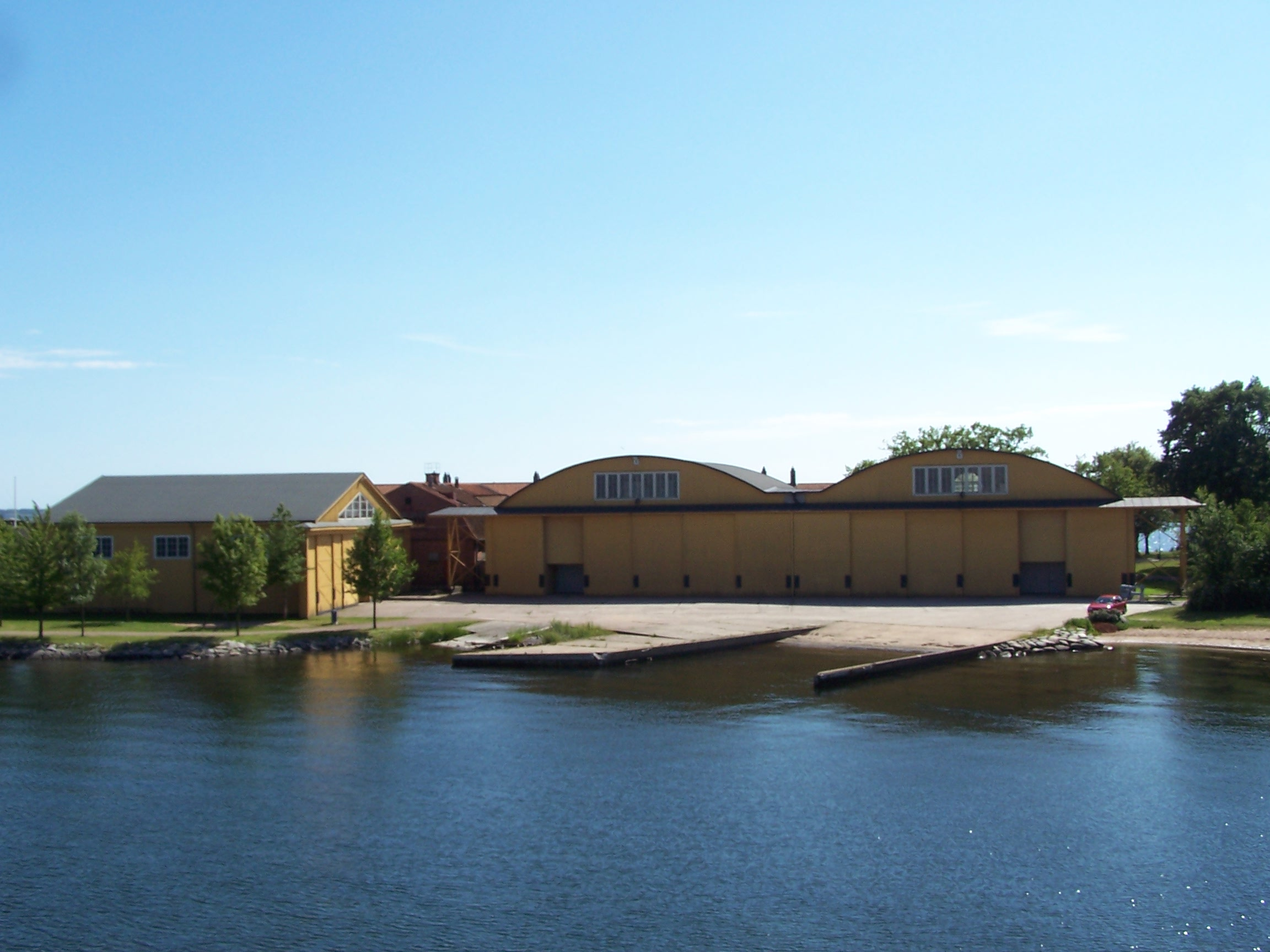
Naval aviation hangar

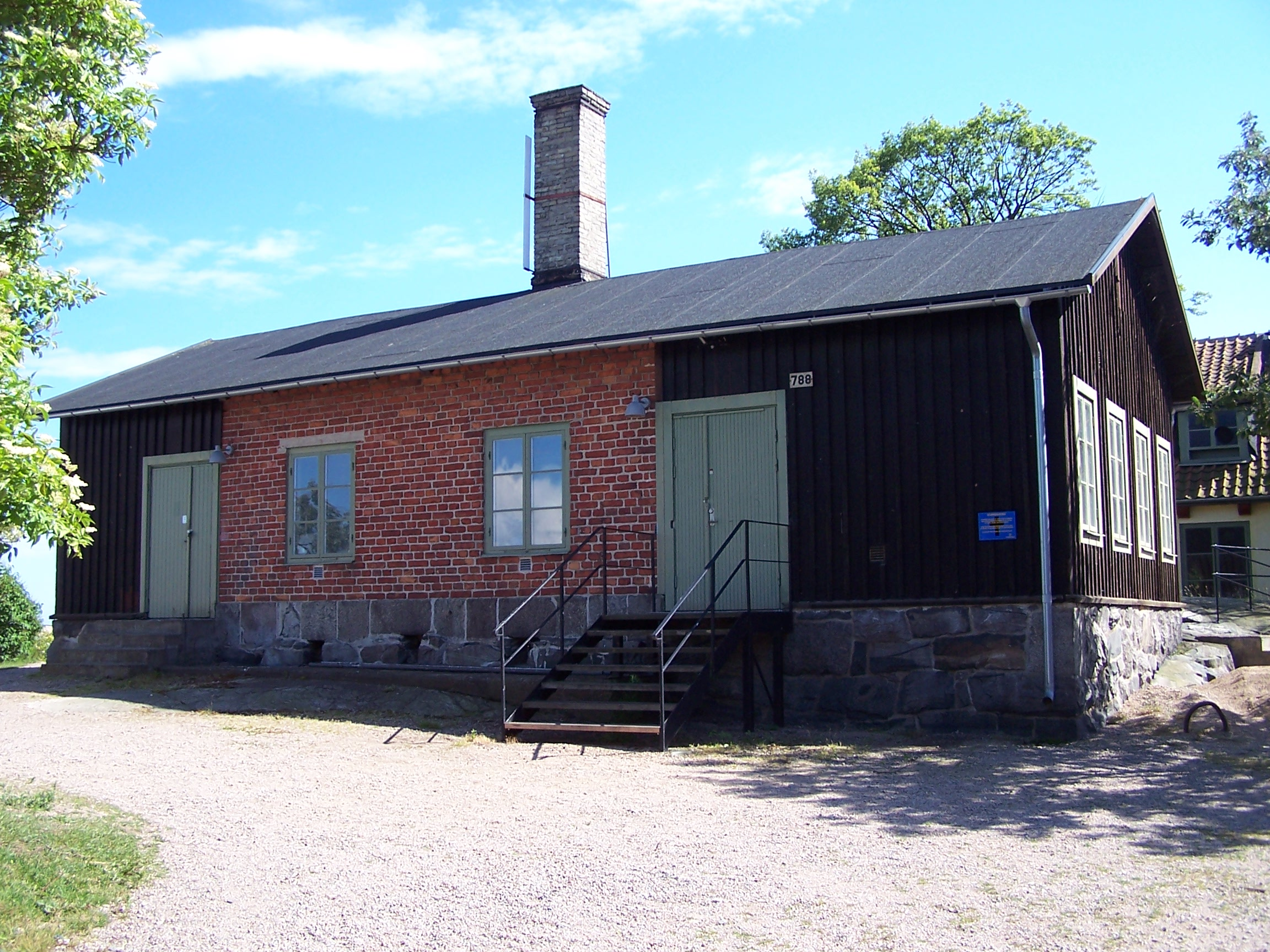
Disinfection Building

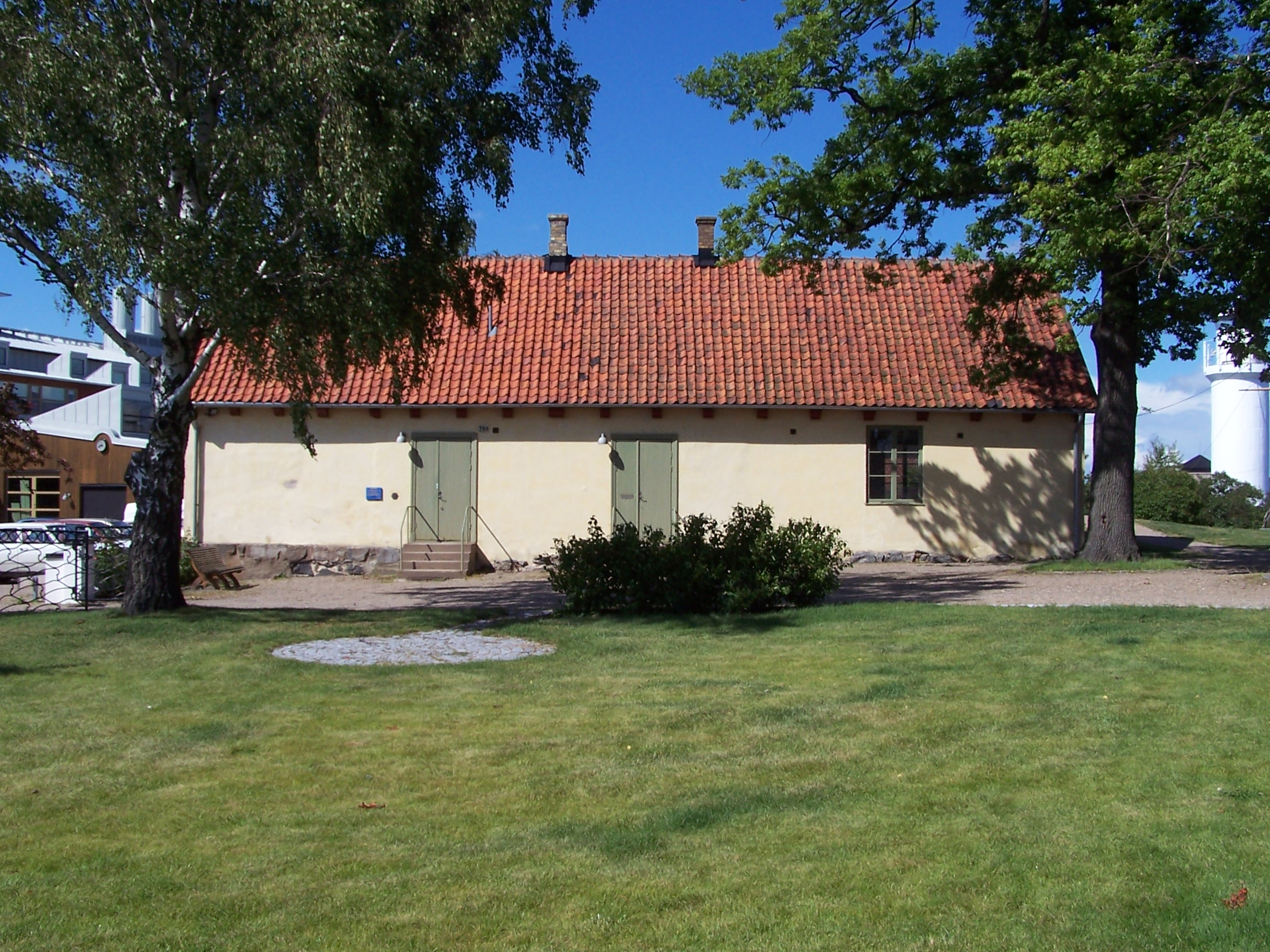
Quarantine Hospital

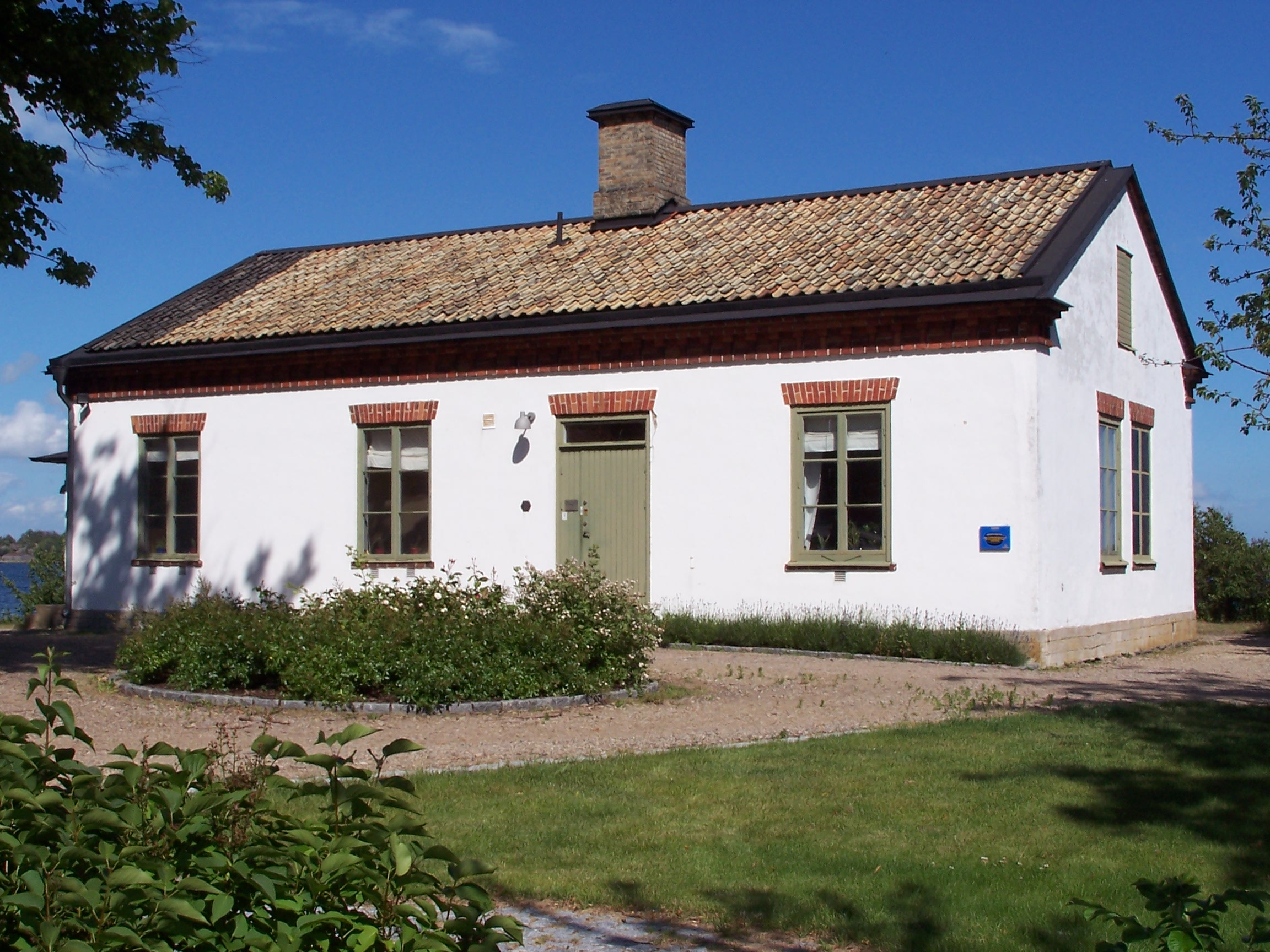
Fumigation Shed
