= Laxen-class submarine =

Swedish coastal submarine class

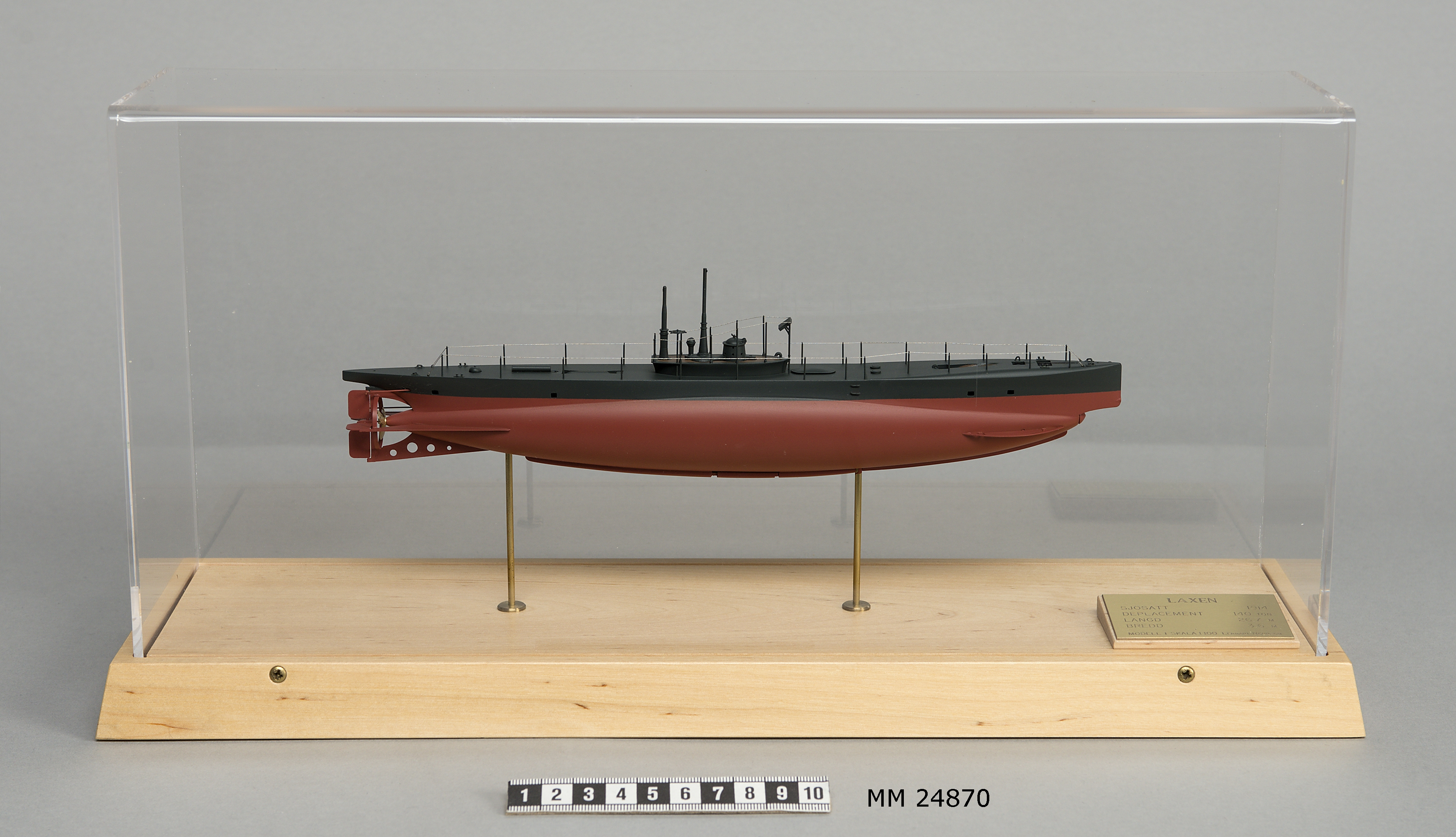
- Model of HSwMS Laxen at Marinmuseum in Karlskrona

Class overview
- Name: Laxen class
- Builders: Karlskrona Navy Yard
- Operators: Swedish Navy
- Preceded by: Undervattensbåten No 2 class
- Succeeded by: Abborren class
- Built: 1913–1915
- In service: 1914–1935
- Completed: 2
- Scrapped: 2

General characteristics
- Type: Coastal submarine
- Displacement: Surfaced: 140 tons; Submerged: 170 tons
- Length: 26.80 m (87 ft 11 in)
- Beam: 3.61 m (11 ft 10 in)
- Installed power: 700 bhp (520 kW) (diesel); 200 hp (150 kW) (electric)
- Propulsion: 2 × 6-cylinder diesel engines; 2 × electric motors; 2 shafts
- Speed: Surfaced: 8.8 knots (16.3 km/h; 10.1 mph); Submerged: 6.6 knots (12.2 km/h; 7.6 mph)
- Complement: 10
- Armament: 1 × 457 mm (18.0 in) torpedo tube

The Laxen class was a pair of coastal submarines operated by the Swedish Navy between 1915 and 1935. The vessels were some of the earliest Swedish submarines and a development of an initial design based on USS Holland. The submarines, Laxen and Gäddan, were commissioned in 1914 and 1915, respectively. The submarines served for about two decades, with the first decommissioned in 1935 and the second in 1931.

== Development and design ==
In 1900, the Swedish Navy sent Carl Richson to the United States, who was ordered to study submarines. After his return, he was inspired by USS Holland and designed HSwMS Hajen, Sweden's first submarine. Over the next decade, Hajen's design was further developed to create a fleet of coastal submarines. One of the later evolutions was the Undervattensbåten No 2 class in 1909, which served as the basis for the Laxen class. Compared to their predecessors, the Laxen class featured improved engines and superstructure. An improved design, which featured an additional torpedo tube and better engines, entered service as the Abborren class several years later.

The class measured 26.80 metres (87 ft 11 in) in length with a beam of 3.61 metres (11 ft 10 in) and displaced 140 tons surfaced and 170 tons submerged. The complement consisted of 10 officers and crew. They were powered by a pair of six-cylinder diesel engines and two electric motors that produced 700 brake horsepower (520 kW) and 200 horsepower (150 kW), which drove two propellers. This gave a maximum speed of 8.8 knots (16.3 km/h; 10.1 mph) on the surface and 6.6 knots (12.2 km/h; 7.6 mph) submerged. Armament comprised a single 457-millimetre (18 in) torpedo tube mounted in the bow.

During World War I, Sweden primarily relied on the Swedish Navy to enforce the nation's neutrality. Swedish doctrine viewed submarines as a cheap method to counter enemy capital ships, and the Navy often pushed to build more boats. Both were built at the Karlskrona Navy Yard and were commissioned into the fleet by 1915. They served through World War I and were retired in the early 1930s.

== Ships in class ==
Data
Name	Laid down	Launched	Commissioned	Stricken
Laxen	1913	1914	1914	1935
Gäddan	1914	1915	1915	1931
