= Abborren-class submarine =

Swedish coastal submarine class

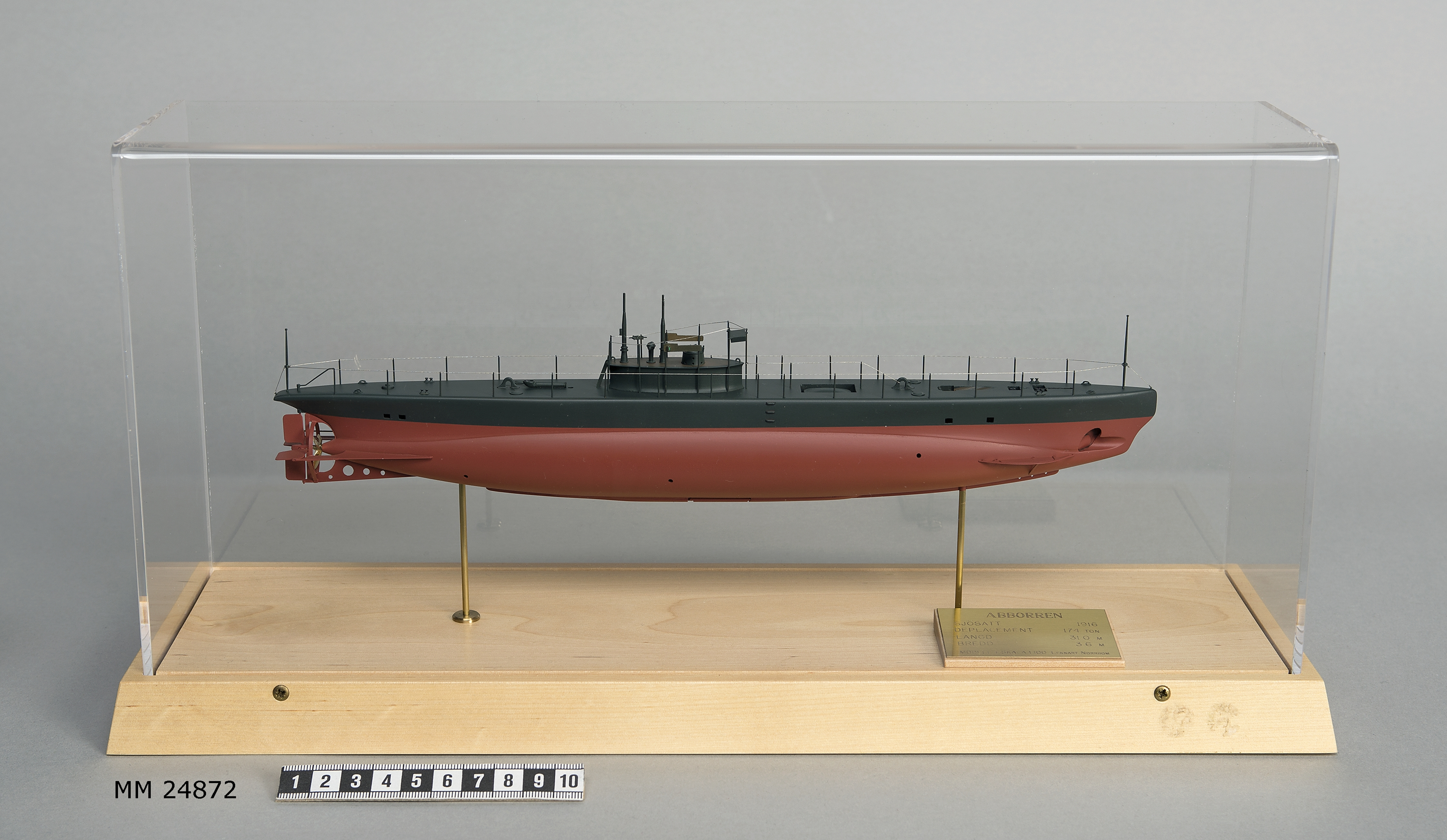
- Model of HSwMS Abborren at Marinmuseum in Karlskrona

Class overview
- Name: Abborren class
- Operators: Swedish Navy
- Built: 1916
- In service: 1916–1937
- Completed: 2
- Scrapped: 2

General characteristics
- Type: Coastal submarine
- Displacement: Surfaced: 174 tons; Submerged: 310 tons
- Length: 30.99 m (101 ft 8 in)
- Beam: 3.61 m (11 ft 10 in)
- Draft: 3.10 m (10 ft 2 in)
- Installed power: 920 bhp (690 kW) (diesel); 280 hp (210 kW) (electric)
- Propulsion: 2 × 6-cylinder diesel engines; 2 × Electric motors; 2 shafts
- Speed: Surfaced: 9.5 knots (17.6 km/h; 10.9 mph); Submerged: 7.4 knots (13.7 km/h; 8.5 mph)
- Complement: 14
- Armament: 2 × 457 mm (18 in) torpedo tubes

The Abborren class was a pair of coastal submarines operated by the Swedish Navy between 1916 and 1937. They were ordered as part of a military build-up to preserve Swedish neutrality during World War I and were the last in a series of submarines initially based on USS Holland. Both submarines were laid down in 1915 and commissioned in 1916. The ships had an uneventful service history and were decommissioned in 1937.

== Development and design ==
In 1900, the Swedish Navy sent Carl Richson to the United States, who was ordered to study submarines. After his return, he was inspired by USS Holland and designed HSwMS Hajen, Sweden's first submarine. Over the next decade, Hajen's design was further developed to create a fleet of coastal submarines. During World War I, Sweden primarily relied on the Swedish Navy to enforce the nation's neutrality. Swedish doctrine viewed submarines as a cheap method to counter enemy capital ships, and the Navy often pushed to build more boats. Throughout the war, the Riksdag invested in the fleet, which included expanding the number of submarines. In 1914, this included the two Laxen class boats that served as the basis for the subsequent Abborren class. Compared to their predecessors, the Abborren class featured an additional torpedo tube and more powerful engines and were the last costal submarines based on Richson's design.

The class had a length of 30.99 metres (101 ft 8 in), a beam of 3.61 metres (11 ft 10 in), and a draught of 3.10 metres (10 ft 2 in). They displaced 174 tons surfaced and 310 tons submerged, with a crew of 14. Propulsion was provided by two six-cylinder diesel engines and two electric motors that generated 920 brake horsepower (690 kW) and 280 horsepower (210 kW), respectively, which drove two propellers. Each boat could reach 9.5 knots (17.6 km/h; 10.9 mph) on the surface and 7.4 knots (13.7 km/h; 8.5 mph) submerged. Armament consisted of two 457-millimetre (18 in) torpedo tubes in the bow, capable of carrying four torpedoes in total.

Both were built at the Karlskrona Navy Yard, laid down in 1915, and commissioned into the fleet in 1916. After serving throughout World War I and the interwar period, they were stricken on 18 June 1937.

== Ships in class ==
Data
Name	Laid down	Launched	Commissioned	Stricken
Abborren	1915	25 May 1916	1916	18 June 1937
Braxen	1915	5 May 1916	1916	18 June 1937
