= HSwMS Desirée =

19th Century Swedish military ship

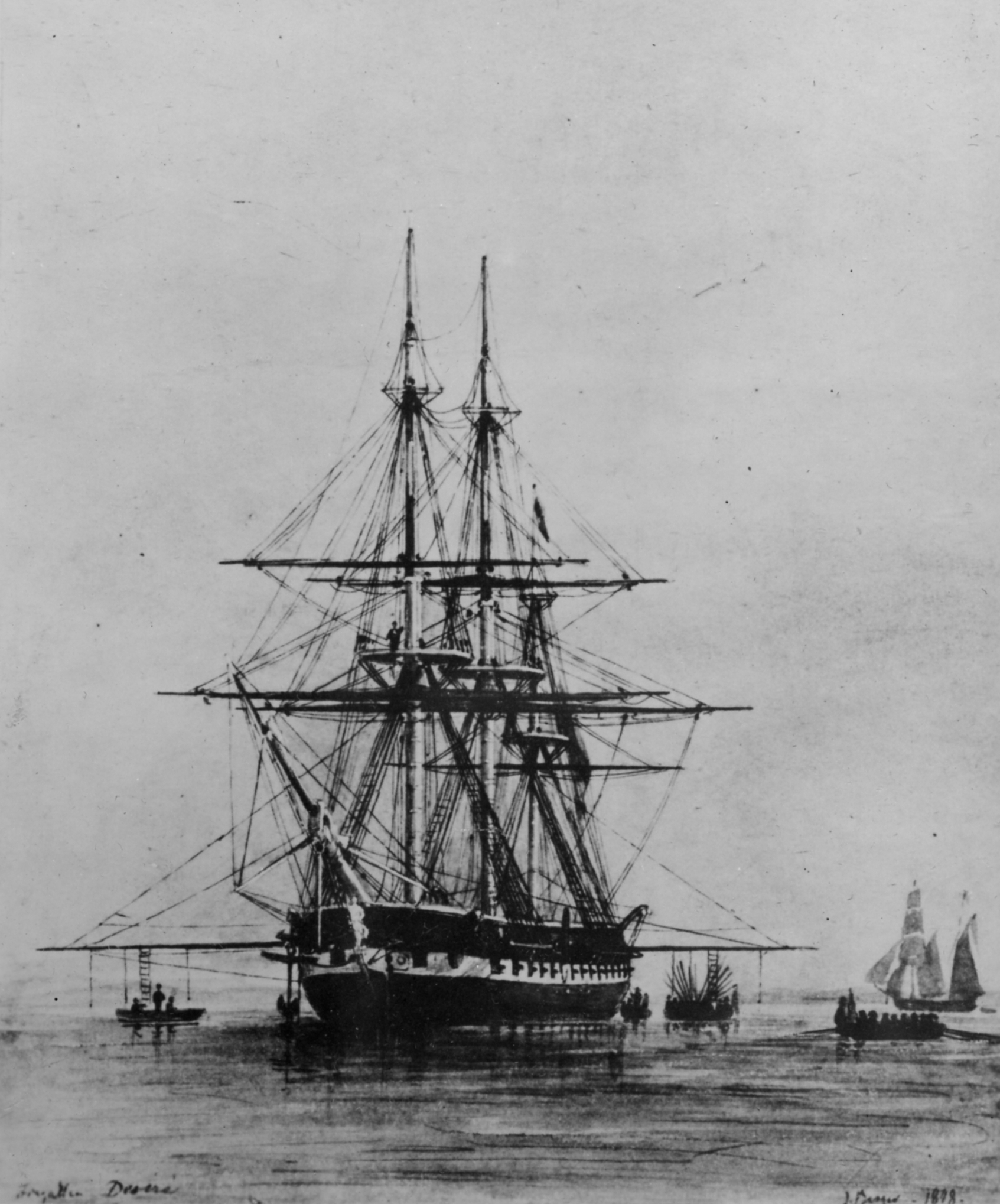
- Desirée in 1848, painting by Johan Christian Berger, on display at Marinmuseum

History

Sweden
- Name: Desirée
- Namesake: Queen Désirée Clary of Sweden-Norway
- Builder: Karlskrona Naval Shipyard
- Launched: 24 July 1843
- Decommissioned: 15 December 1862
- Fate: Broken up in 1867 after being used as coal storage

General characteristics
- Type: Frigate
- Displacement: 2,085 tons
- Length: 52.6 m (172 ft 7 in)
- Beam: 13.6 m (44 ft 7 in)
- Draft: 6.5 m (21 ft 4 in)
- Armament: 46 × 30-pounder guns; 6 × 7-inch shell guns

HSwMS Desirée was a Swedish frigate of the Royal Swedish Navy, named after Queen Desideria of Sweden-Norway. She was built at the Karlskrona Naval Shipyard to the designs of naval constructor Johan Aron af Borneman and launched on 24 July 1843. Her armament consisted of 46 thirty-pounder guns and six 7-inch shell guns.

Desirée served as the flagship of a Swedish-Norwegian naval squadron assembled in the Øresund under Rear Admiral Carl August Gyllengranat to support Denmark during the First Schleswig War (1848–1851). After a temporary ceasefire, the war resumed in 1849, with Commander Salomon Mauritz von Krusenstierna acting as both squadron and ship commander.

She was struck from service on 15 December 1862 and, after being used for several years as a coal hulk, was finally broken up in May 1867.
