= Undervattensbåten No 2-class submarine =

Swedish coastal submarine class

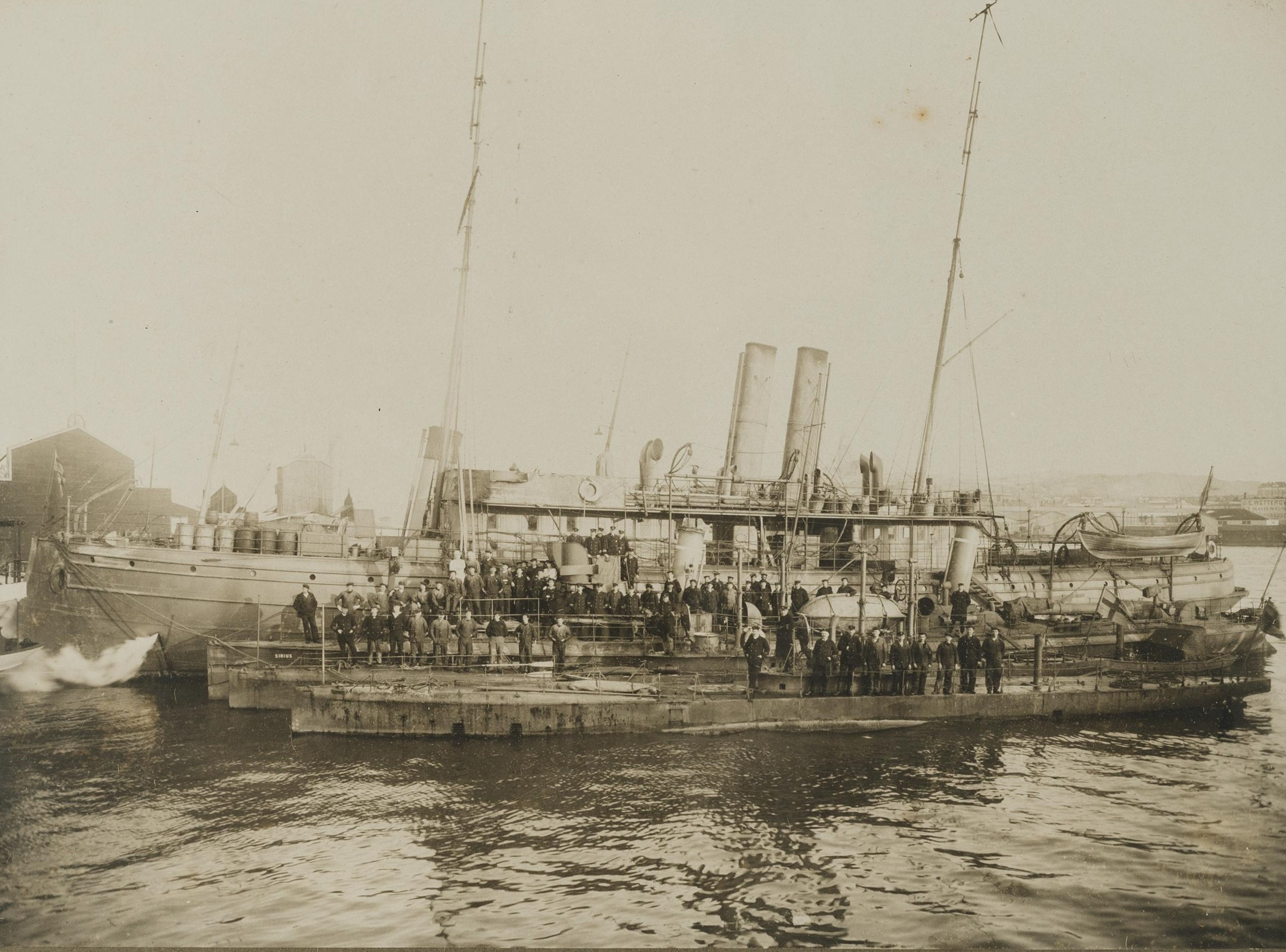
- Underettensbåten No 2 and Underettensbåten No 3 foreground in front of several other vessels

Class overview
- Name: Underettensbåten No 2 class
- Builders: Motala Verkstad
- Operators: Swedish Navy
- Preceded by: HSwMS Hajen
- Succeeded by: Laxen class
- Built: 1908–1910
- In service: 1909–1930
- Completed: 3
- Scrapped: 3

General characteristics
- Type: Coastal submarine
- Displacement: Surfaced: 138 tons; Submerged: 230 tons
- Length: 26.72 m (87 ft 8 in)
- Beam: 3.61 m (11 ft 10 in)
- Draft: 3.00 m (9 ft 10 in)
- Installed power: 420 bhp (310 kW) (diesel); 200 hp (150 kW) (electric)
- Propulsion: 1 × 6-cylinder Polar diesel engine; 1 × electric motor
- Speed: Surfaced: 8.8 knots (16.3 km/h; 10.1 mph); Submerged: 6.6 knots (12.2 km/h; 7.6 mph)
- Complement: 12
- Armament: 1 × 457 mm (18 in) torpedo tube

The Undervattensbåten No 2 class was a trio of coastal submarines operated by the Swedish Navy between 1909 and 1930. The boats were some of the earliest Swedish submarines and were heavily based on HSwMS Hajen, the first of her kind. The submarines, numbered 2 through 4, operated for two decades before being discarded by 1930.

== Development and design ==
In 1900, the Swedish Navy sent Carl Richson to the United States, who was ordered to study submarines. After his return, he was inspired by USS Holland and designed HSwMS Hajen, Sweden's first submarine. After Hajen entered service in 1904, Richson revisited the design in 1909. He enlarged the superstructure and added an outer casing, which entered service as the Undervattensbåten No 2 class. Several years later, the design was again modified, with better engines and superstructure, to create the Laxen-class submarines.

The class measured 26.72 metres (87 ft 8 in) in length with a beam of 3.61 metres (11 ft 10 in), draught of 3.00 metres (9 ft 10 in), and displaced 128 tons surfaced and 230 tons submerged. The complement consisted of 12 officers and crew. They were powered by a pair of Polar six-cylinder diesel engines and one electric motor that produced 420 brake horsepower (310 kW) and 200 horsepower (150 kW) respectively, which drove two propellers. This gave a maximum speed of 8.8 knots (16.3 km/h; 10.1 mph) on the surface and 6.6 knots (12.2 km/h; 7.6 mph) submerged. Armament consisted of a single 457-millimetre (18 in) torpedo tube mounted in the bow with a total capacity of three torpedoes.

The submarines were built by Motala Verkstad and were all launched in 1909. After entering service, the submarines operated along the Swedish archipelago before they were decommissioned between 1929 and 1930.

== Ships in class ==
Data
Name	Laid down	Launched	Commissioned	Stricken
Underettensbåten No 2	1908	25 February 1909	1909	6 June 1929
Underettensbåten No 3	1908	14 April 1909	1909	21 November 1930
Underettensbåten No 4	1909	16 October 1909	1910	6 June 1929
