= Johan Törnström =

Sculptor (1743–1828)

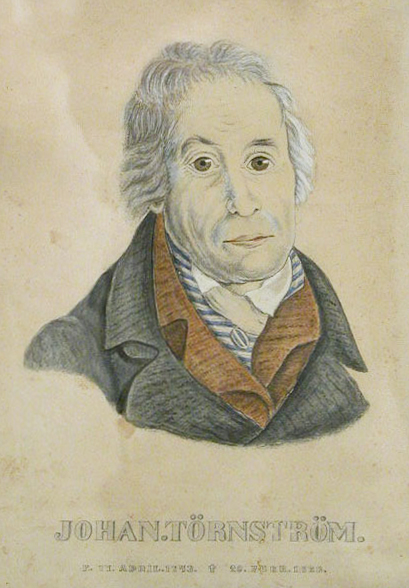
Johan Törnström, akvarell

Johannes "Johan" Törnström (17 April 1743 – 20 February 1828) was admiralty sculptor to the Swedish Navy at the Karlskrona naval base. He carved a number of figureheads for naval vessels, which are now housed at the Marinmuseum.

== Early years ==
Törnström was born in Ekeby, Västmanland. The son of a farmer, Törnström apprenticed in Stockholm with the wood sculptor G. J. Fast, and with the Frenchman Jean-Baptiste Masreliez (or Maserliez) (1753–1801). While Masreliez trained Törnström in wood carving and cabinet making, he never received formal training at the Royal Swedish Academy of Arts. His work, and that of Fredrik Henrik af Chapman, the Swedish Naval officer and shipbuilder, was inspired and influenced by the Neoclassical ideas of Admiral Augustin Ehrensvärd.

== Career ==
Törnström worked for a time as a furniture carver; he created works for the Stockholm Royal Palace until 1781; he created carvings for ships. Most likely, Törnström became acquainted with af Chapman during this time.

In 1781, af Chapman became manager of the Karlskrona shipyard, and summoned Törnström to become the official figurehead carver to the Navy. From 1782 to 1818, he worked at the shipyard's Sculptor's Workshop, which was originally built in the 1760, but whose masque crowning was redesigned by Törnström in a Neoclassical architectural style, meant to represent the classical Greek goddess of drama. He created most of the figureheads for 19 frigates (female depictions) and 15 ships of the line (male depictions) during his years at the Karlskrona shipyard. The oak carvings depicted Neoclassical figures, which could be more than 10 feet (3.0 m) in height and could take as much as 24 months to complete. While his style was described as "rugged" and "chunky", and evoked antique ideals as patriotic works, his female figures were characterized as buxom, wearing diaphanous clothing. Several of his figureheads are part of the collection at the Marinmuseum on Stumholmen Island in Karlskrona, ten of which arrived in the 1960s.

When the Navy suspended shipbuilding in 1790, Törnström created works for churches to provide for his family of ten children. He became a member of the Royal Swedish Academy of Arts in 1803. In 1814, he created the altarpiece and pulpit for the German Church in Karlskrona (Heliga Trefaldighetskyrkan; also, "Church of Holy Trinity"). He died in 1828.

Törmström died in Karlskrona.

== Gallery ==
Some of Törnström's figureheads are on display at the Marinmuseum. They include Minerva, Fäderneslandet ("Fatherland"), Fröja, Camilla, Galatea, Försiktigheten ("Prudence"), Äran ("Honour"), Dristigheten, La Badine och Carl XIII.

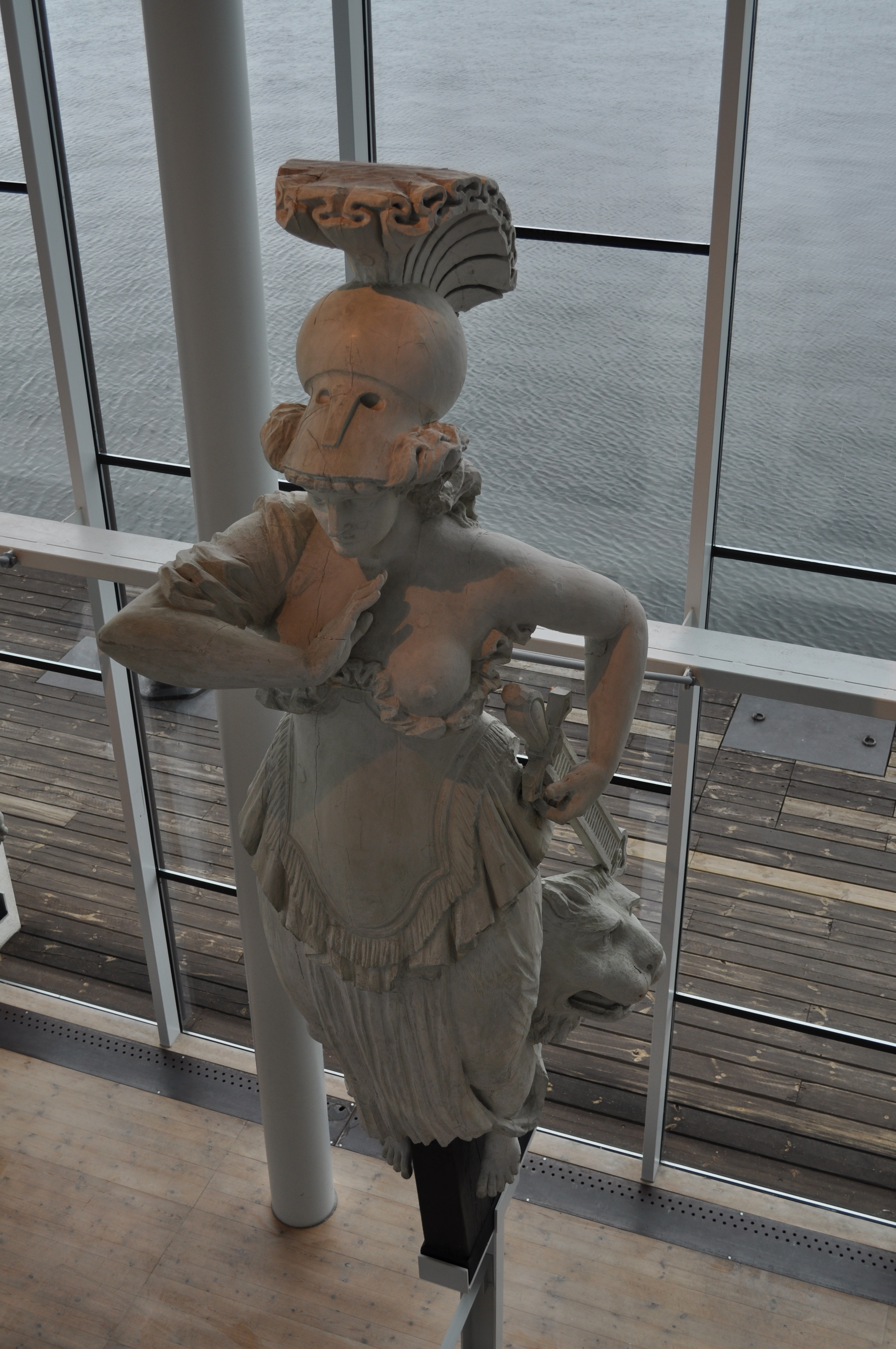
Svea for the gunship Fäderneslandet (1783)

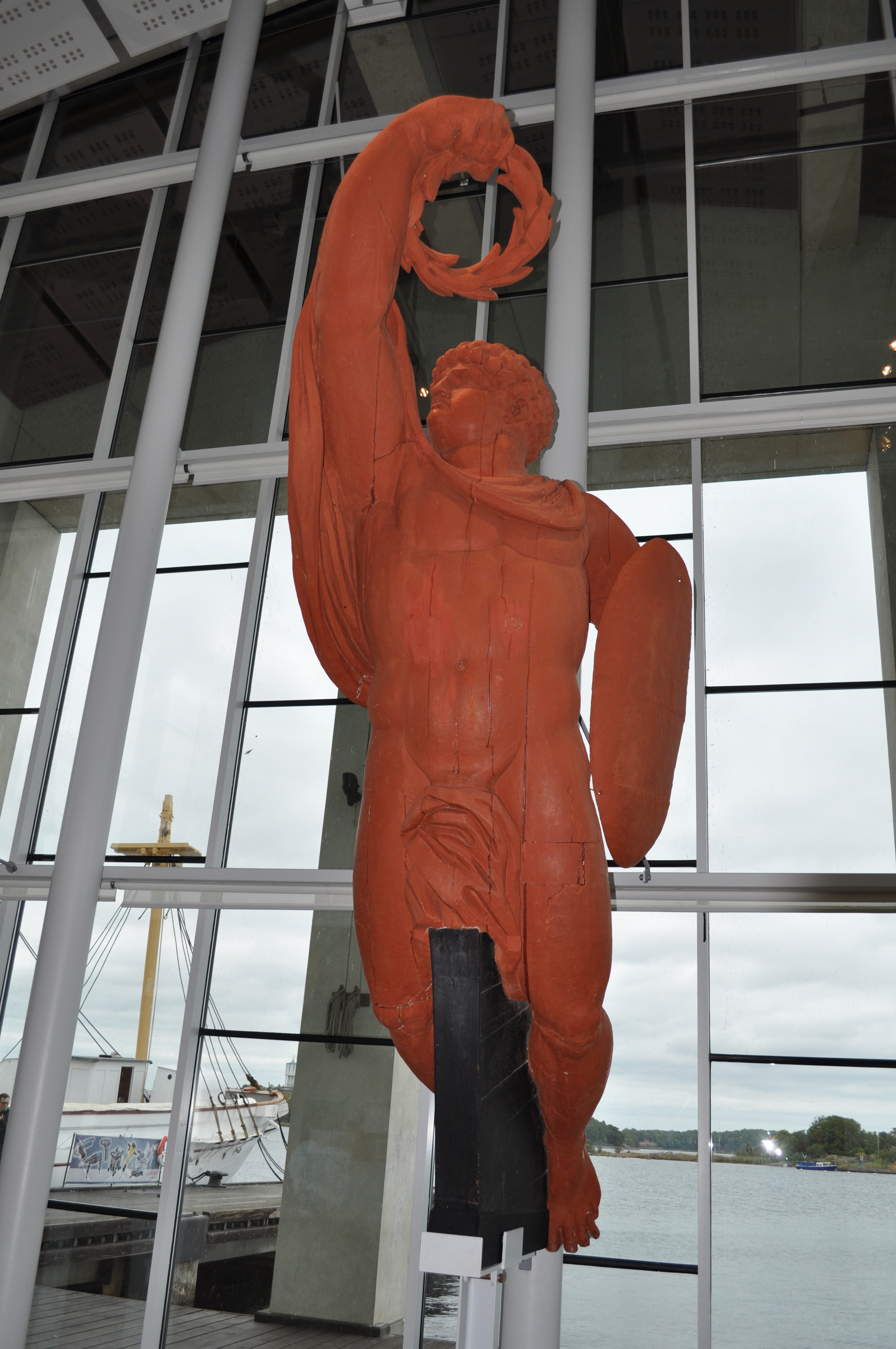
"Äran" for the ship of the line Äran (1784)

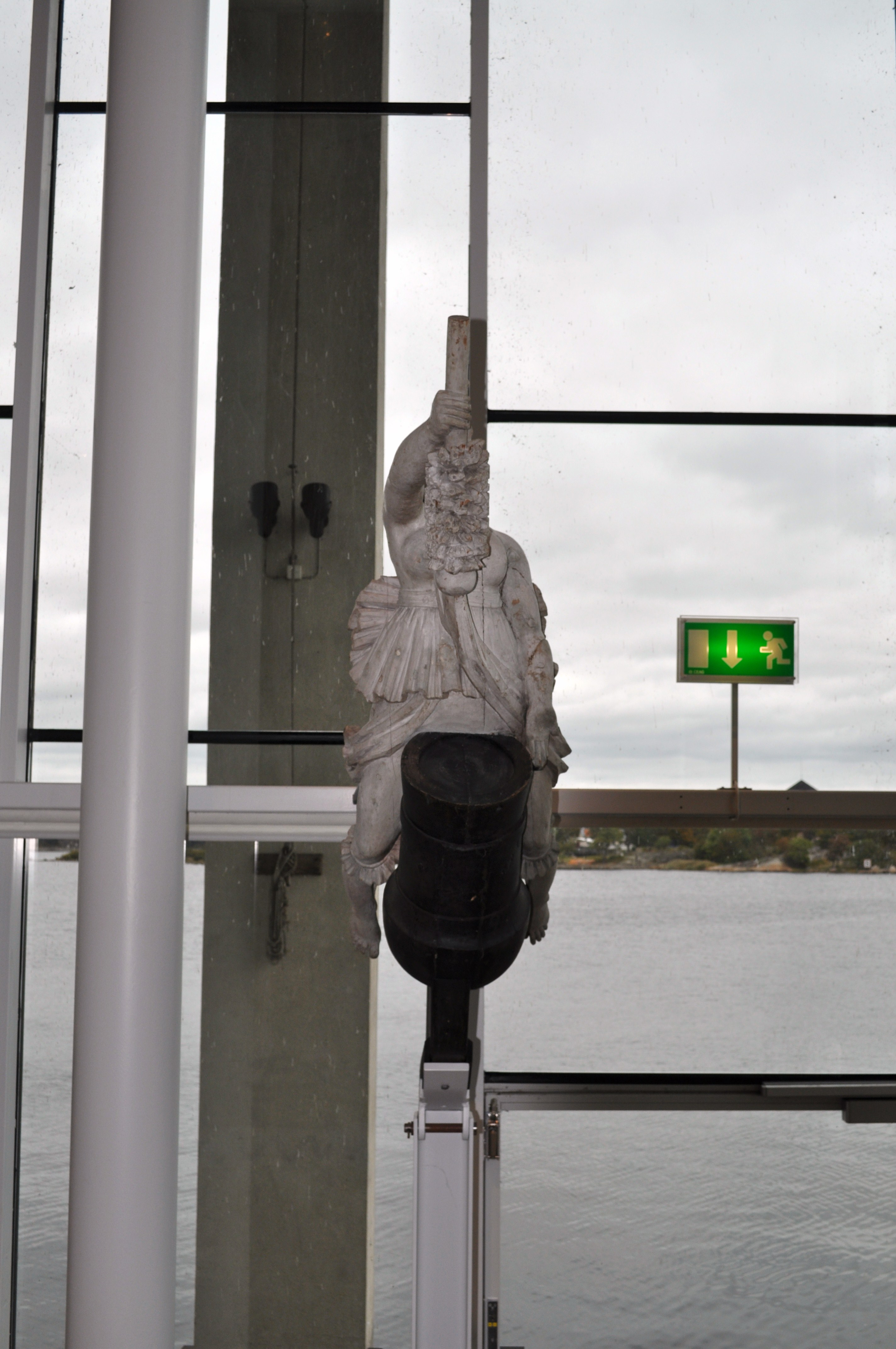
La Badin for the brigantine Le Badin (1815)

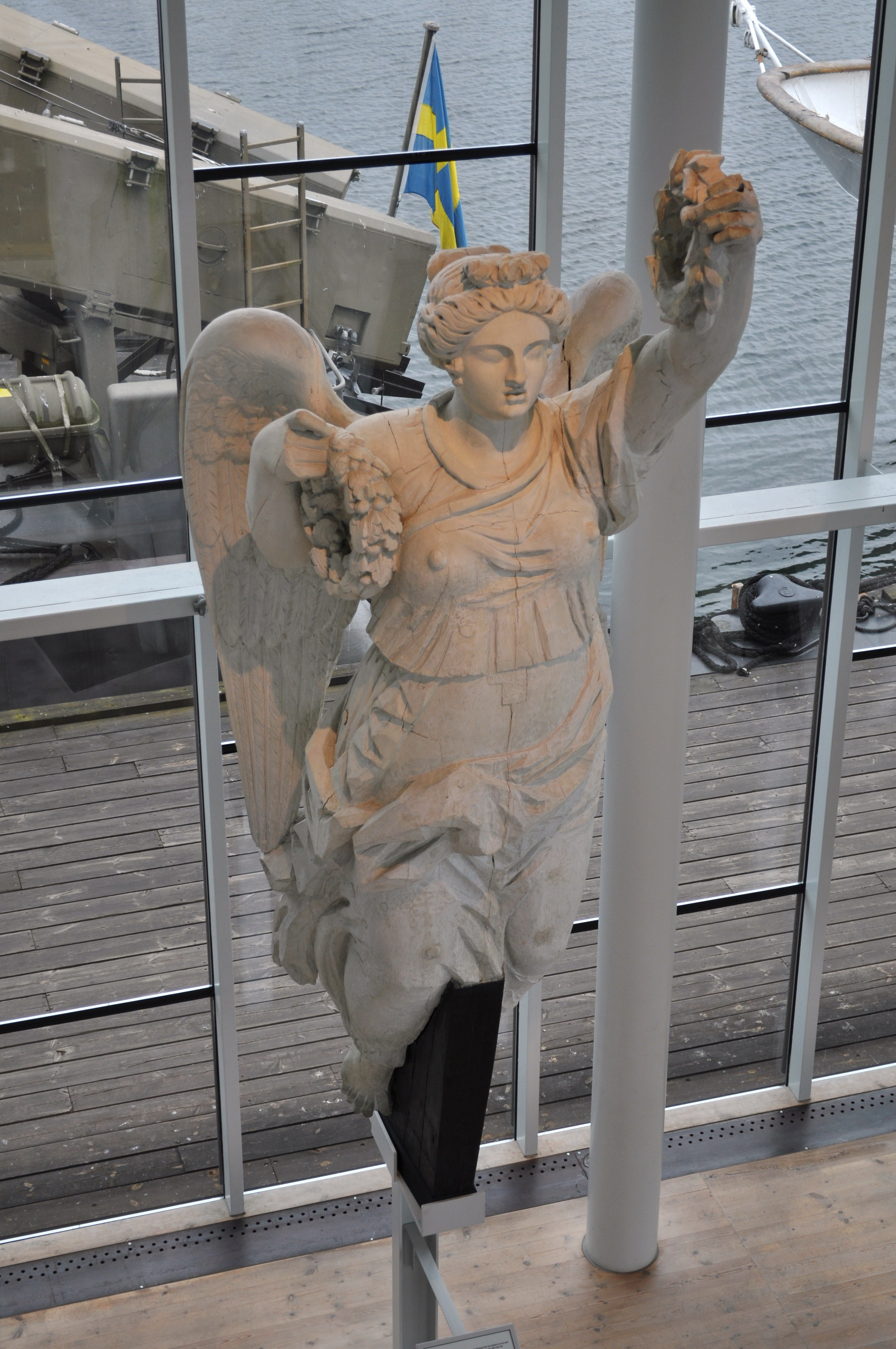
The goddess of "Victory" for the gunship Carl XIII (1819)
