= Marinmuseum =

Military history museum in Sweden

Coordinates: 56.1614°N 15.5995°E

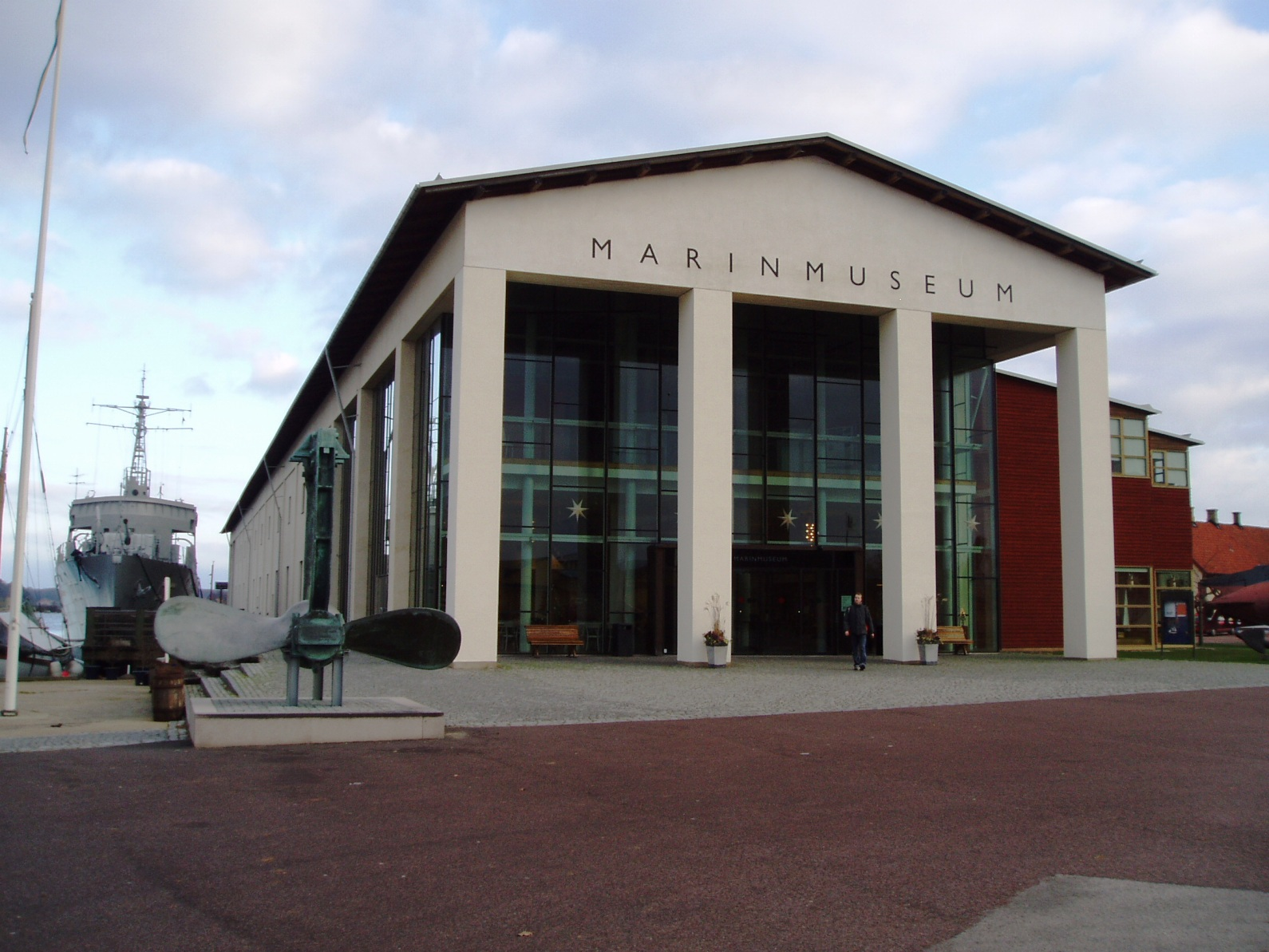
Marinmuseum

Marinmuseum (previously: Shipyard Museum, Varvsmuseet; alternate: Naval Dockyard Museum; translation: Naval Museum) is a maritime museum located on Stumholmen island, in Karlskrona. It is Sweden's national naval museum, dedicated to the Swedish naval defense and preservation of the country's naval history.

== History ==
Marinmuseum is one of Sweden's oldest museums. The museum was established in 1752 when King Adolf Frederick began the collection and documentation of naval objects in what was called the Model Room (Modellkammaren). He also ordered the preservation of ship models and shipbuilding machinery.

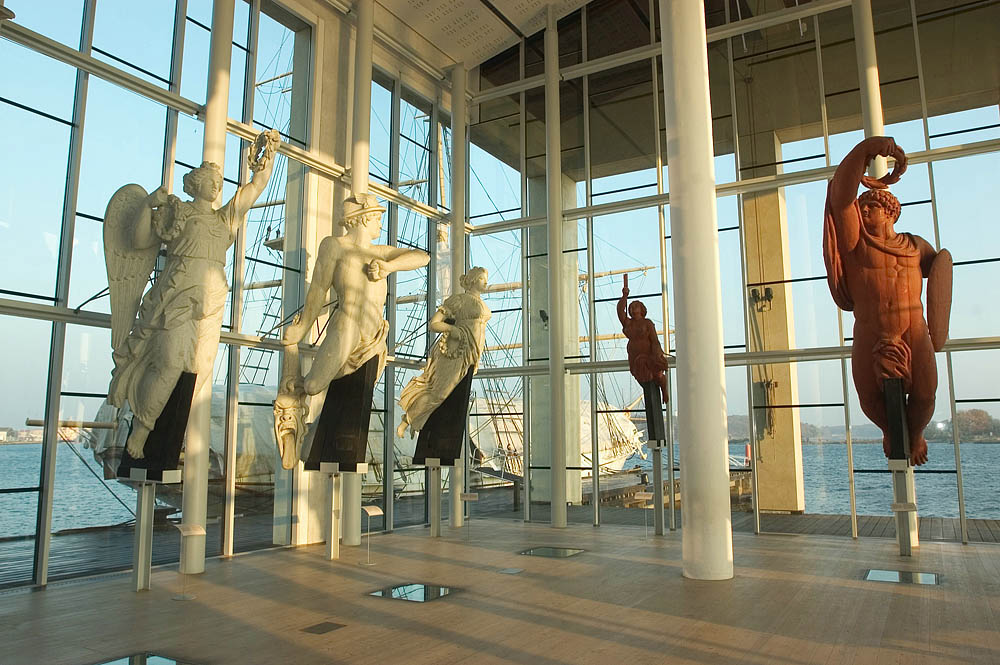
Figurehead Hall at Marinmuseum

During the period of 1953 through 1997, the museum was situated in the barracks of the Örlogshamnen naval harbor. Prior to 1963, it was known as the Shipyard Museum (Varvsmuseet). In the 1960s, ten figureheads created by Johan Törnström were brought to the museum. Since June 1997, the museum has been housed on the island of Stumholmen in central Karlskrona. The Statens Maritima Museer organization oversees the operations of the Marinmuseum, as well as Stockholm's Vasa Museum and the Maritime Museum.

== Architecture and fittings ==
The rectangular building design includes a pier which extends into the water. Around the pier are several museum ships. A specially designed underwater tunnel with windows provides a way to view the wreckage of several seventeenth-century ships.

== Collections ==
Figureheads from Swedish ships are on display, including many that were made by sculptor Törnström, royal sculptor to the navy, who worked at the Karlskrona shipyard during the 1700s. These include the figurehead of the ship the Dristigheten. The Marinmuseums Archives include 4,000 drawings and maps, mostly relating to the Sweden's Naval history; there are also pictures, paintings, and models. Subjects include submarines, shipbuilding strategies, battle tactics, and life on board ships of the Baltic Sea.

In June, 2014, a new section of the museum opened where visitors can view the very first submarine of the Swedish navy, HMS Hajen, as well as its far more modern sister in arms, HMS Neptun, which can be viewed not only from the outside but also from the inside.

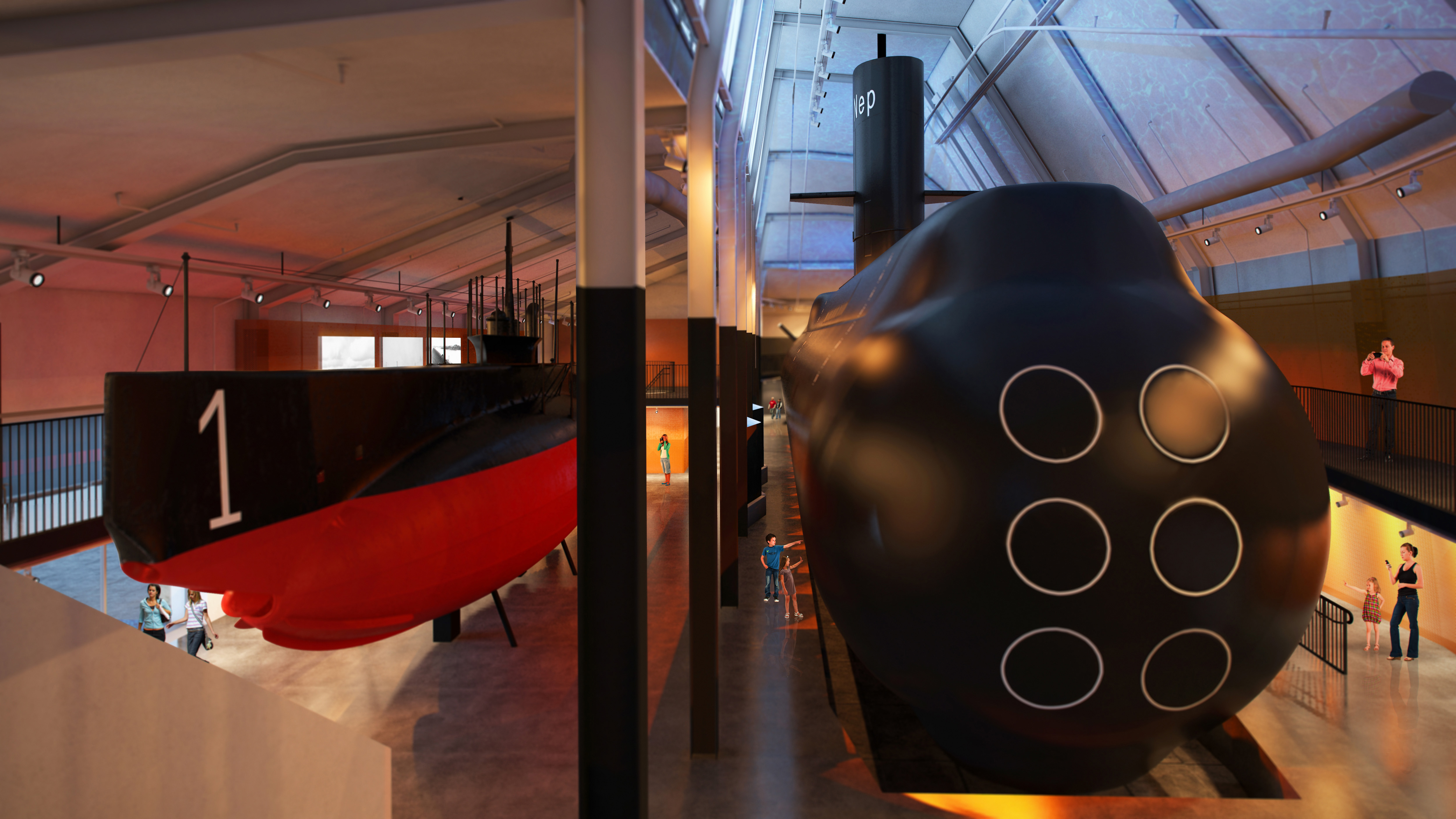
HMS Hajen, in service 1905-1922, and HMS Neptun, in service 1980-1998

Four warships are docked outside the museum as museum ships. The minesweeper, HSwMS Bremon, the fast attack craft, HSwMS Vastervik, the torpedo boat, HSwMS T-38, and the sail training ship HSwMS Jarramas.
