= Archer (disambiguation) =

An archer is a person who practices archery, using a bow to shoot arrows.

Archer or Archers may also refer to:

== People and fictional characters ==
- Archer (given name), including a list of people and fictional characters
- Archer (surname), including a list of people and fictional characters
- Baron Archer, an extinct title in the Peerage of Great Britain

== Places ==
=== Antarctica ===
- Archer Glacier, Graham Land
- Archer Point, Oates Land
- Mount Archer (Antarctica), Oates Land
- Archer Peak, Victoria Land

=== Australia ===
- Archer, Northern Territory, a suburb of Palmerston
- Archer Creek, west of Sydney Harbour
- Archer River, Cape York Peninsula
- Mount Archer, Queensland (Rockhampton Region), Queensland
- Mount Archer, Queensland (Somerset Region), Queensland

=== United States ===
- Archer, Florida, a city
- Archer, Idaho, an unincorporated community
- Archer, Illinois, an unincorporated community
- Archer, Iowa, a city
- Archer, Nebraska, an unincorporated community
- Archer, Nevada, a former mining camp
- Archer, Tennessee, an unincorporated community
- Archer, West Virginia, an unincorporated community
- Archer County, Texas
  - Archer City, Texas
- Archer Key, an island in Florida
- Archer Township, Harrison County, Ohio

== Arts and entertainment ==
=== Films ===
- "The Archers", the British film-making partnership of Powell and Pressburger
- Archer (film), a 1985 Australian TV film about the horse Archer (see Sports section)
- The Archer (film), a 1982 Finnish drama
- The Archer, 2005, directed by John Palmer
- The Archer, a 2017 drama directed by Valerie Weiss

=== Fictional characters ===
- Archer (DC Comics), a fictional character
- Archer (Fate/stay night), in Fate/stay night media
- Archer (Marvel Comics), an X-Factor character in Marvel Comics
- Archer, a titular character from the Valiant Comics book Archer & Armstrong

=== Statues and sculptures ===
- The Archer (Lepcke), a statue by Ferdinand Lepcke in Bydgoszcz, Poland
- Bogenspannerin (Berlin), one of its copies in Berlin, Germany
- The Archer (Moore), an abstract sculpture
- The Archer, a statue by Eric Aumonier at East Finchley tube station, London

=== Television ===
- Archer (1975 TV series), an NBC television series
- Archer (2009 TV series), an American animated television series

=== Music ===
- The Archers (musical group), a Christian music band
- The Archers (album), by The Archers, 1973
- The Archer (album), by Alexandra Savior, 2020
- "The Archer" (song), by Taylor Swift from Lover, 2019
- "Archer", a song by Arcturus from Arcturian, 2015
- "Archer", a song by Billy Corgan from Ogilala, 2017
- "The Archer", a song by Killa Sin from the soundtrack The Man with the Iron Fists, 2012
- "The Archer", a song by Bölzer from Hero, 2016
- "The Archer", a song by Alexandra Savior from The Archer, 2020
- "The Archer", a song by Greta Van Fleet from Starcatcher, 2023

=== Other arts and entertainment ===
- Archers (Kirchner), a 1935-1937 painting by Ernst Ludwig Kirchner
- The Archers, a long-running BBC Radio 4 soap opera
- The Archers, a 1796 opera by Benjamin Carr with a book by William Dunlap

== Companies ==
- Archer Capital, an Australian private equity firm
- Archer Mobile, a mobile technology company
- Archer Aviation, an American electric aircraft company

== Military ==
- Archer (tank destroyer), Self Propelled 17pdr, Valentine, Mk I, a British self-propelled anti-tank gun
- AA-11 Archer, NATO reporting name of the Vympel R-73 air-to-air missile
- Archer Artillery System, a partnership to develop a self-propelled artillery system for Sweden and Norway
- Operation Archer, a Canadian Forces operation supporting Operation Enduring Freedom in Afghanistan
- Archer (ship), various naval ships
- Archer class (disambiguation), various ship classes

== Sports ==
- Archer (horse) (1856–1872), Australian racehorse that won the first two Melbourne Cups in 1861 and 1862
- Archer Grand Prix cycle race, international cycle race held annually in Britain for over 50 years
- Archers Lacrosse Club, American lacrosse team in the Premier Lacrosse League
- Bydgoszcz Archers, American football team from Bydgoszcz, Poland

== Transportation ==
- 35th/Archer station, a Chicago Transit Authority station
- Piper Archer, Piper PA-28 Cherokee airplane; discontinued in 2009
- Rue des Archers, a street in Lyon, France
- Archer Avenue, outside Chicago, Illinois, US
- Archer Avenue lines, home to two stations in the Jamaica neighborhood of the Queens borough in New York City

== Other uses ==
- "The Archer", another name for the constellation Sagittarius or the astrological sign of the same name
- Archer High School, a public high school in Lawrenceville, Georgia, US
- Archer (typeface), a slab serif style digital typeface
- Airborne Real-time Cueing Hyperspectral Enhanced Reconnaissance (ARCHER), an aerial imaging system
- Advanced Research Computing High End Resource (ARCHER), a UK supercomputer; see Edinburgh Parallel Computing Centre

== See also ==
- Archery (disambiguation)
- Archar (disambiguation)
