= Bogenspannerin (disambiguation) =

Bogenspannerin is sculpture by Ferdinand Lepcke:

- The Archer (Lepcke), original in Bydgoszcz, Poland
- Four copies of the statue still exist in German cities:
  - Bogenspannerin (Berlin), Berlin
  - Coburg, Upper Franconia, Bavaria
  - Heringsdorf, Usedom Island in Western Pomerania
  - Wilhelmshaven, Lower Saxony
