= Archa (disambiguation) =

Archa is a transliteration of the Tatar name of Arsk, a town in the Republic of Tatarstan, Russia.

Archa may also refer to:

- Archa, a beer brewed by ThaiBev
- Archa (document store), a mediaeval document repository

== See also ==
- Archaea (disambiguation), or Archea
- Archery (disambiguation)
- Archa Darugha, a division of Kazan Khanate and later of Kazansky Uyezd
- Ala-Archa, a river in Kyrgyzstan
- On-Archa, a river in Kyrgyzstan
