= Archaic =

Archaic may refer to:

- Archaic Period (several meanings), archaeological term used to refer to a very early period differing by location
- Archaic humans, people before homo sapiens
- Archaic (comics), a comic-book series created by writer James Abrams and artist Brett Marting
- Archaism, an archaic word or style of speech or writing.

== See also ==
- Archaea, several meanings
- Archean, a geological eon
