= Rose Garden, Coburg =

Park in Coburg, Bavaria, Germany

Rose Garden
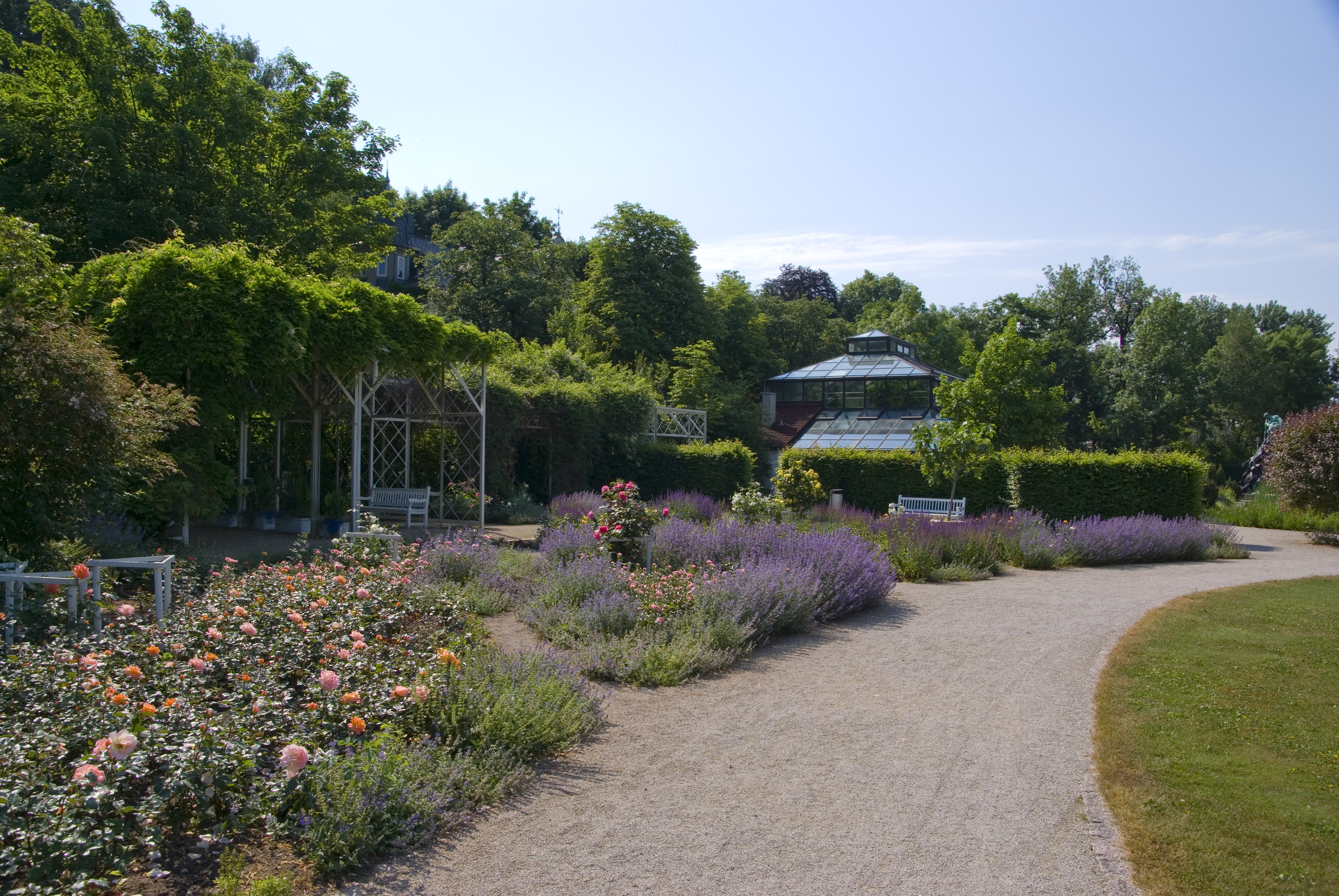
- The Rose Garden in Coburg

- Location within Germany
- Nearest city: Coburg
- Coordinates: 50°15′10″N 10°57′56″E

The Rose Garden (German: Rosengarten) is a park in Coburg, Bavaria, Germany, located between the Ketschentor (town gate) and the Angerturnhalle (a gym).

== History ==
Originally the area was a field called the Zollbauernwiese. The town of Coburg bought it in 1846. In 1906, the Sintflutbrunnen ("deluge fountain") was built by Ferdinand Lepcke to the south. This was a gift by the people of Coburg to their duke, Karl Eduard. The Rose Garden itself was created in 1929, when the "German Rose Revue" took place here and attracted 200,000 visitors.

In 1947, the town took over responsibility for the park's upkeep. The Rose Garden was significantly adapted in the 1960s, when the Congress Centre was built at the north of the park. The park was opened up and a big lawn was laid in its centre. Between 1987 and 1988 the Rose Garden was redeveloped again.

== Features ==
There are over 72 types of roses in the park. A palmhouse and some biotopes were also built. Since 1998, the Rose Garden has been an inner-city recreation centre. Despite its location being near streets, noise levels are low, and the appearance of the park has improved as the plants have grown. The big lawns are used in the summer for picnics. Adimission to the Rose Garden is free. An annual festival has been held in the Rose Garden since 2007(the Sintflutbrunnenfest).

=== Commemoratives plaques ===
There are two plaques in the Rose Garden, one commemorating composer Johann Strauss, who married in the town hall of Coburg and lived in Coburg until his death. The house where he worked and lived was in the Alexandrinenstraße until 1988. The other plaque commemorates Julius Popp, one of the creators of the Rose Garden.

=== Palmhouse ===
The palmhouse is at the south of the Rose Garden next to the fountain. It was opened on 10 March 1984 and has an area of 255 square metres. The building (20x15m) is made up of two parts: the vestibule and the main building. There are various types of orchids, bamboo, cactus and even birds. The house is open year-round and admission is free.

=== Congress Centre ===
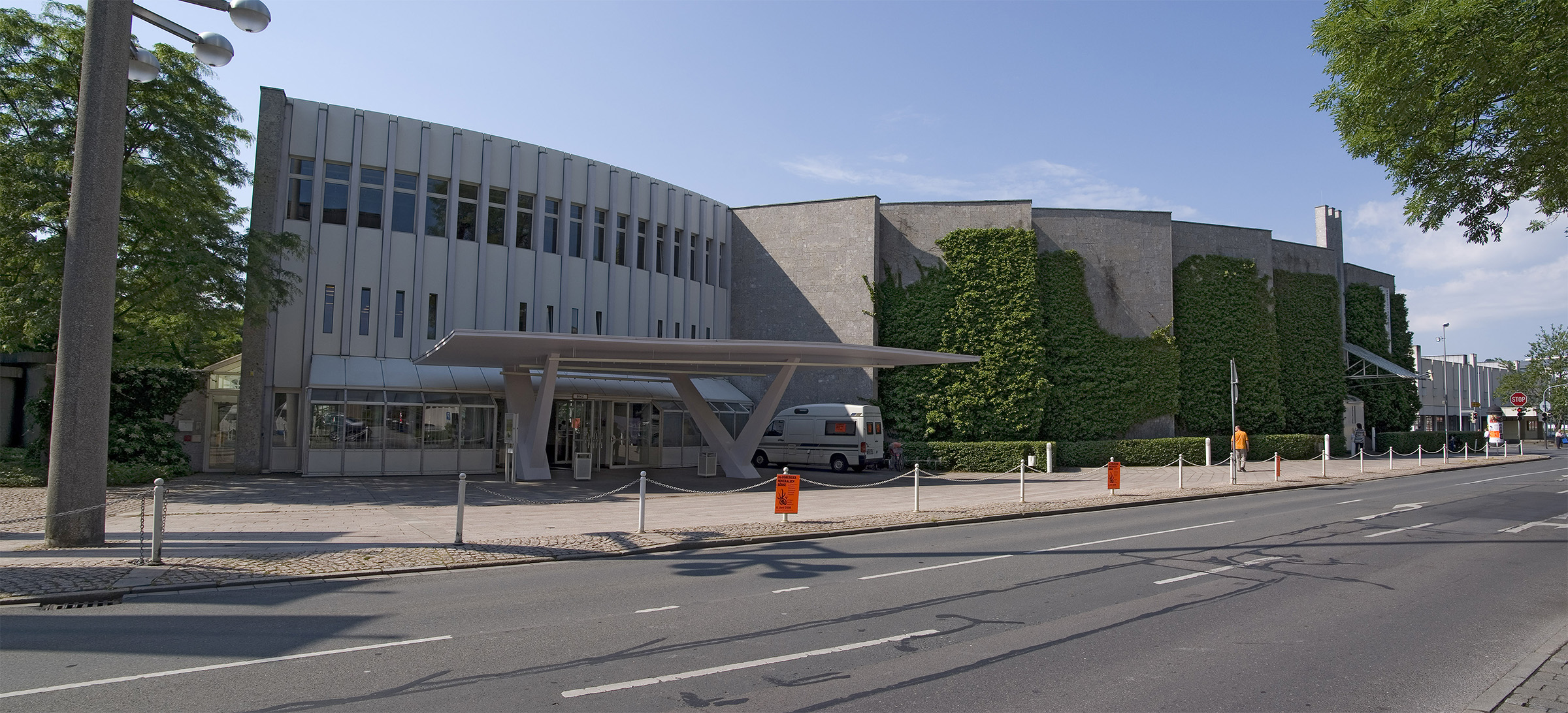
Congress Centre as seen from the street

Coburg's Congress Center is in the north of the Rose Garden. The building, completed in 1962, is a made of glass and iron and has plenty of light. The centre has two big halls for congresses for up to 1,100 people and other rooms for conferences. The centre also has a restaurant with a large patio affording panoramic views of the Rose Garden in summer.

== Plans ==
The future of the Rose Garden and the Congress Centre is uncertain. The new concept for the city centre (Neues Innenstadt Konzept) envisages a radical reconstruction of the garden and the demolition of the Congress Centre. The fountain is to be moved to the north of the Rose Garden. When and whether these plans are to be realized has not been decided. In May 2008, an architectural contest closed.

== Gallery ==
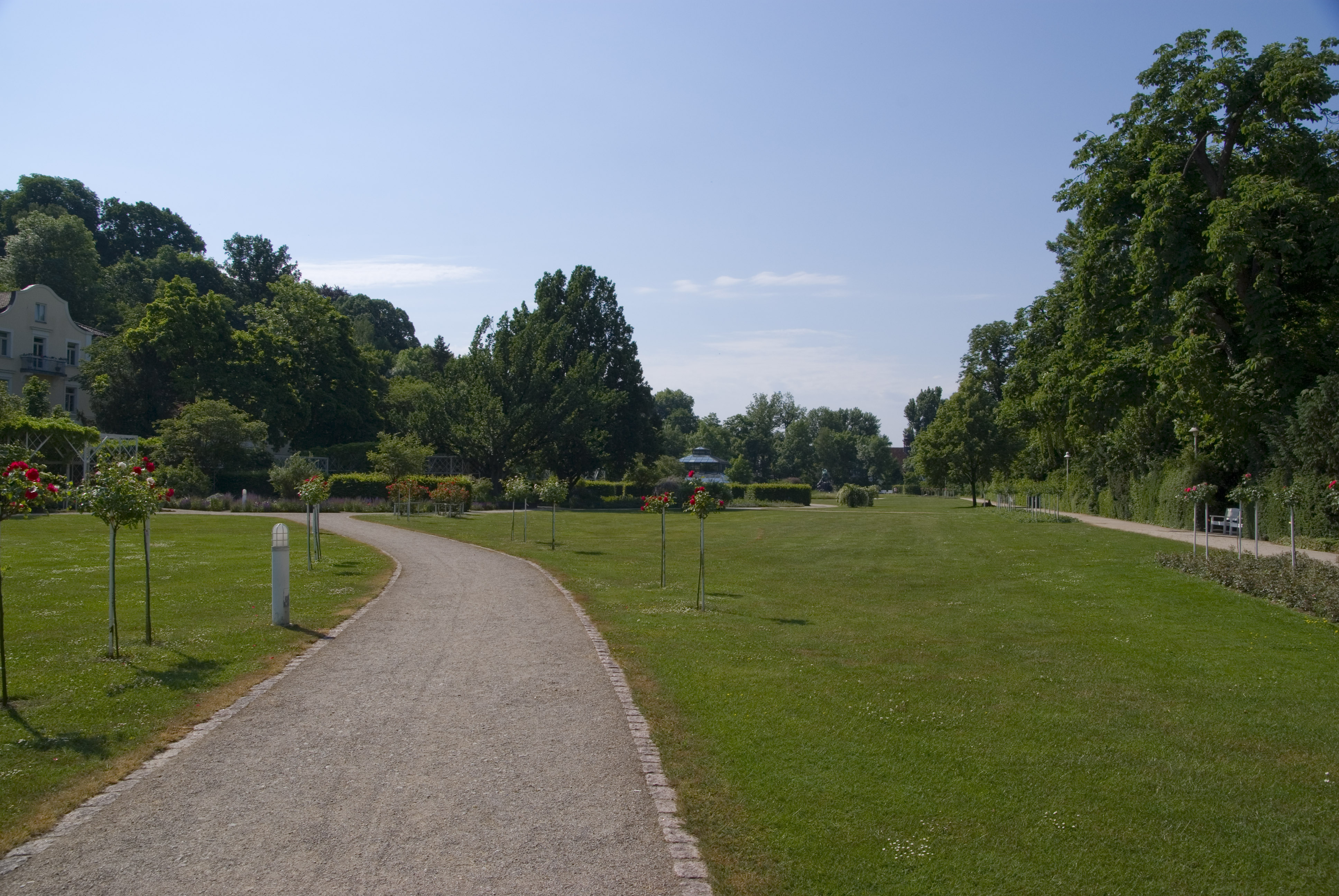
View from the north

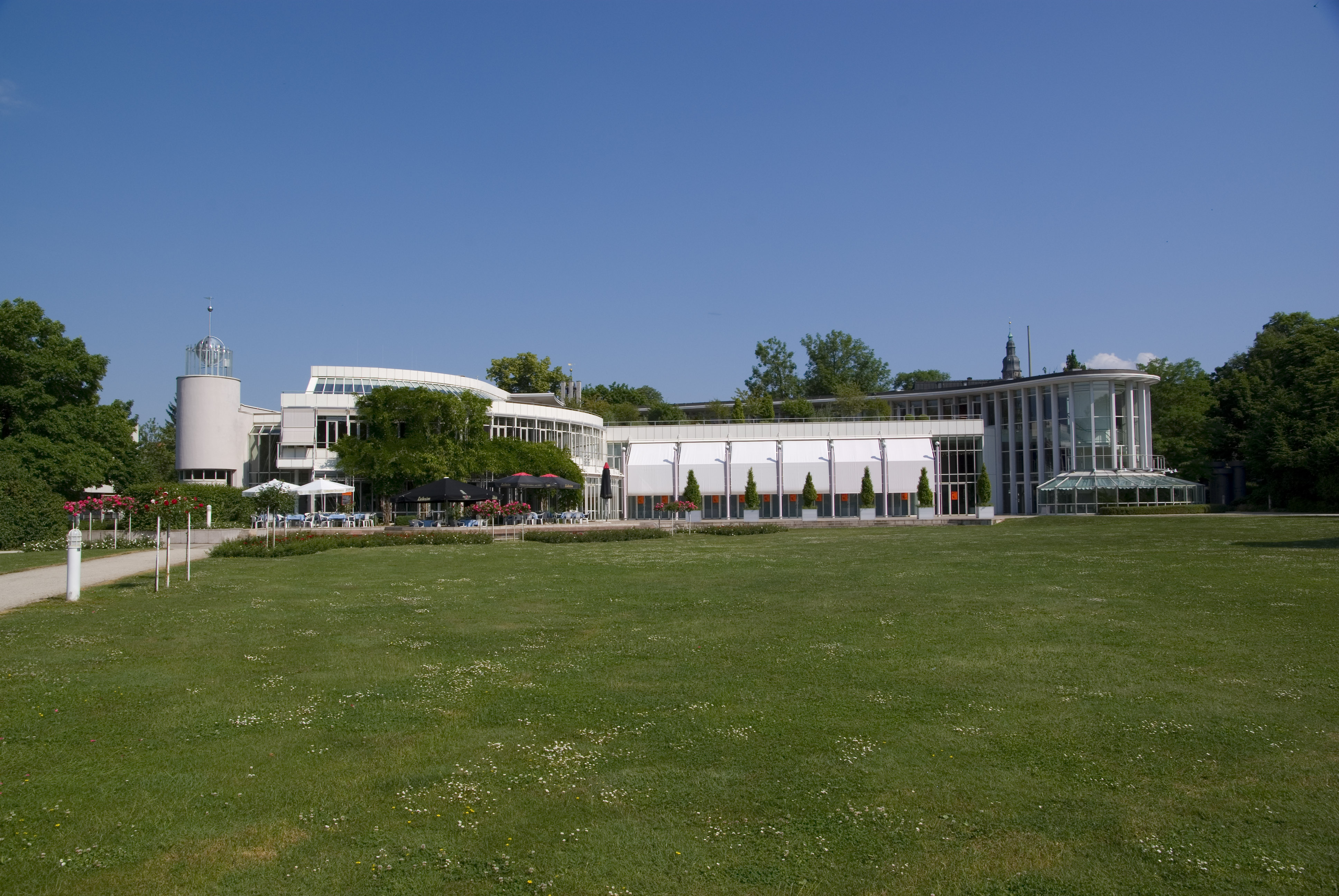
South side of the Congress Centre

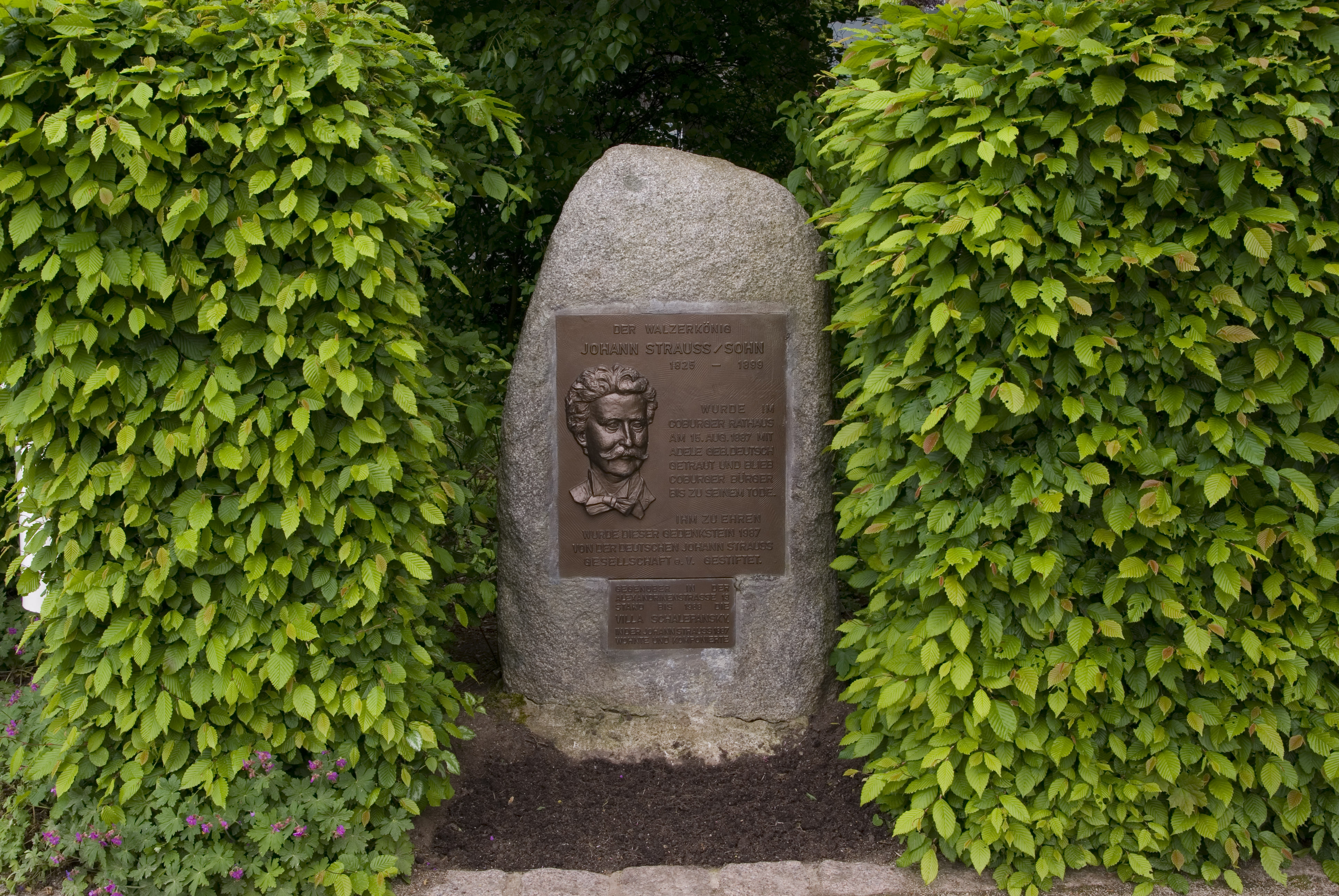
Plaque commemorating Johann Strauss

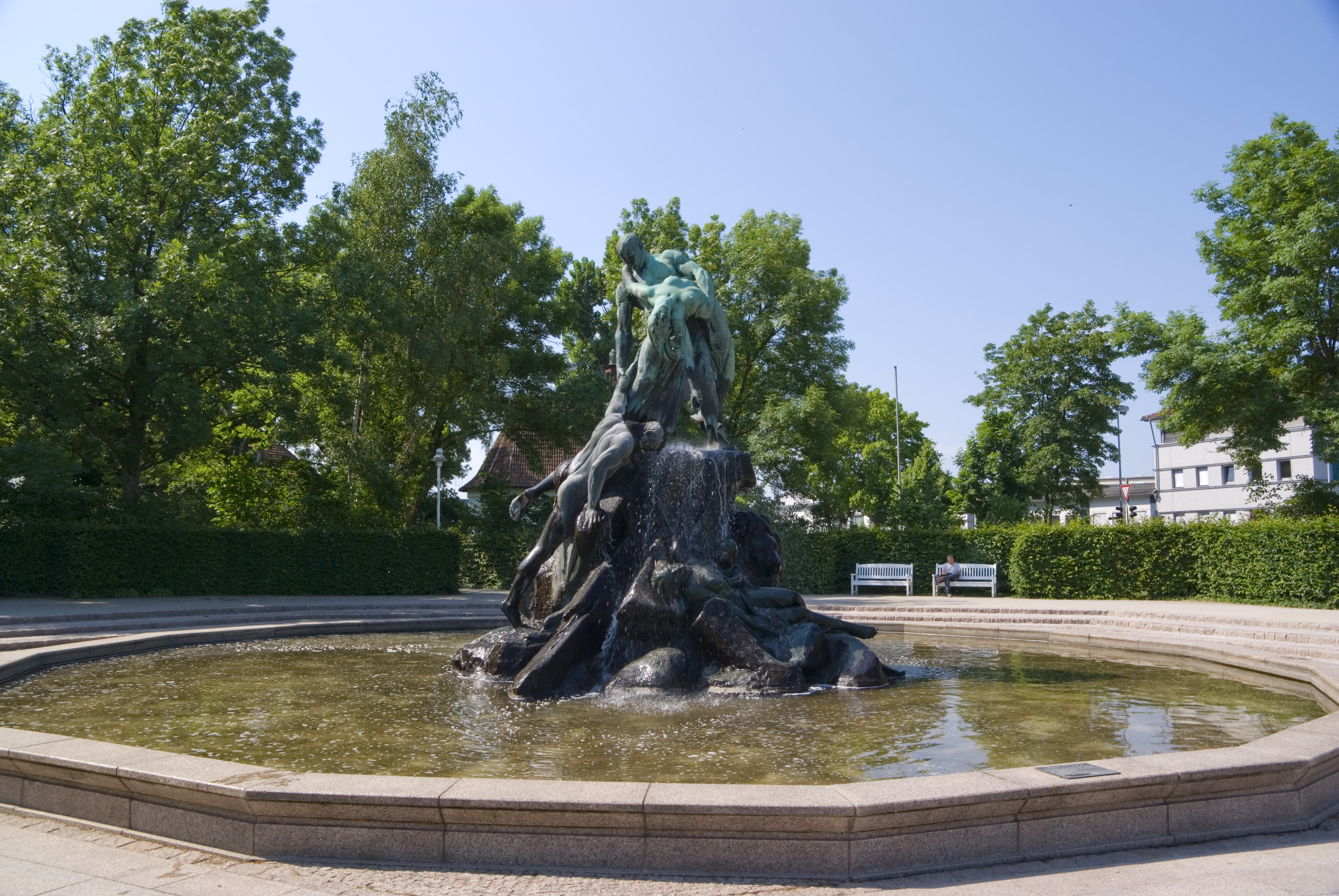
Sintflutbrunnen (fountain)

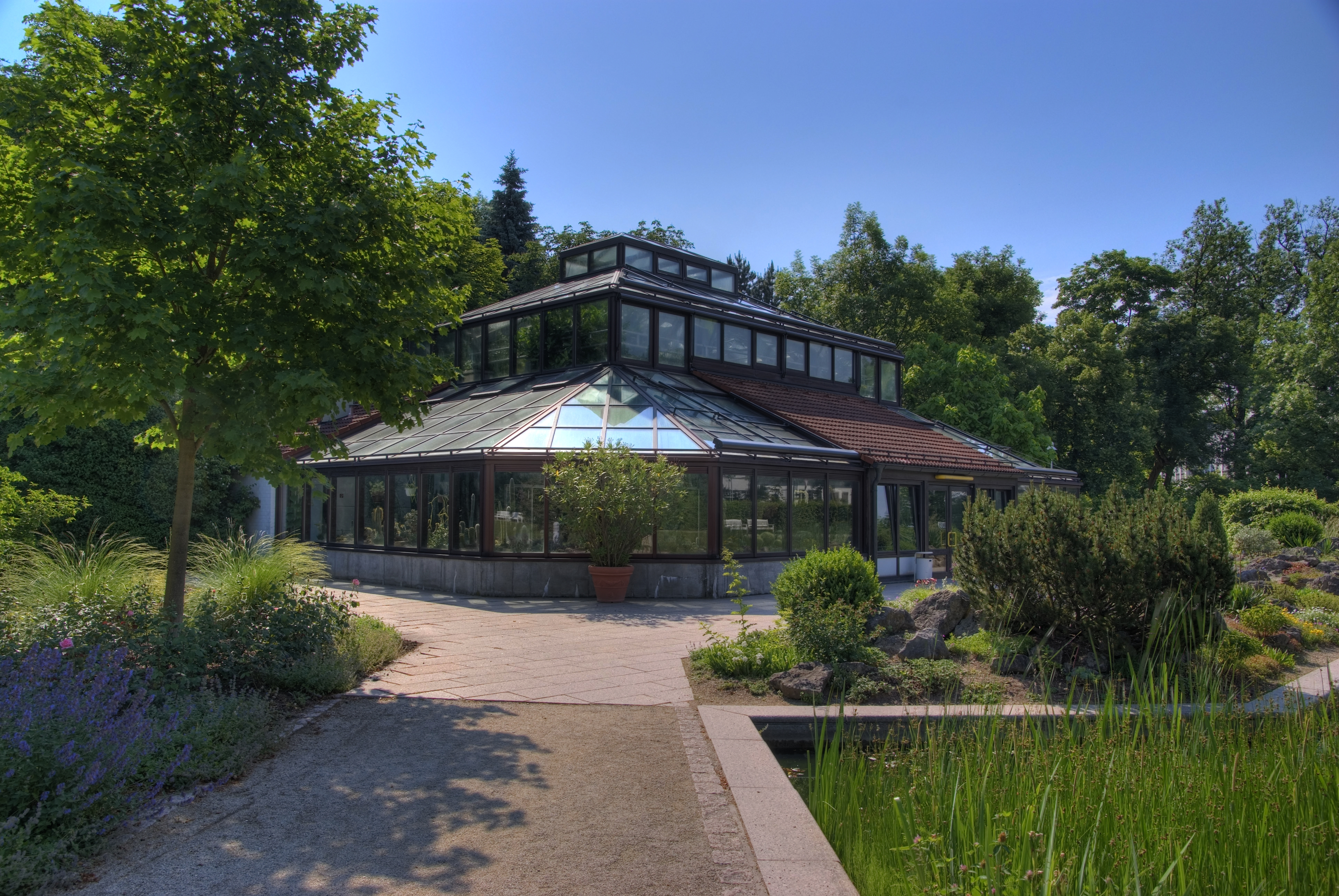
Palmhouse

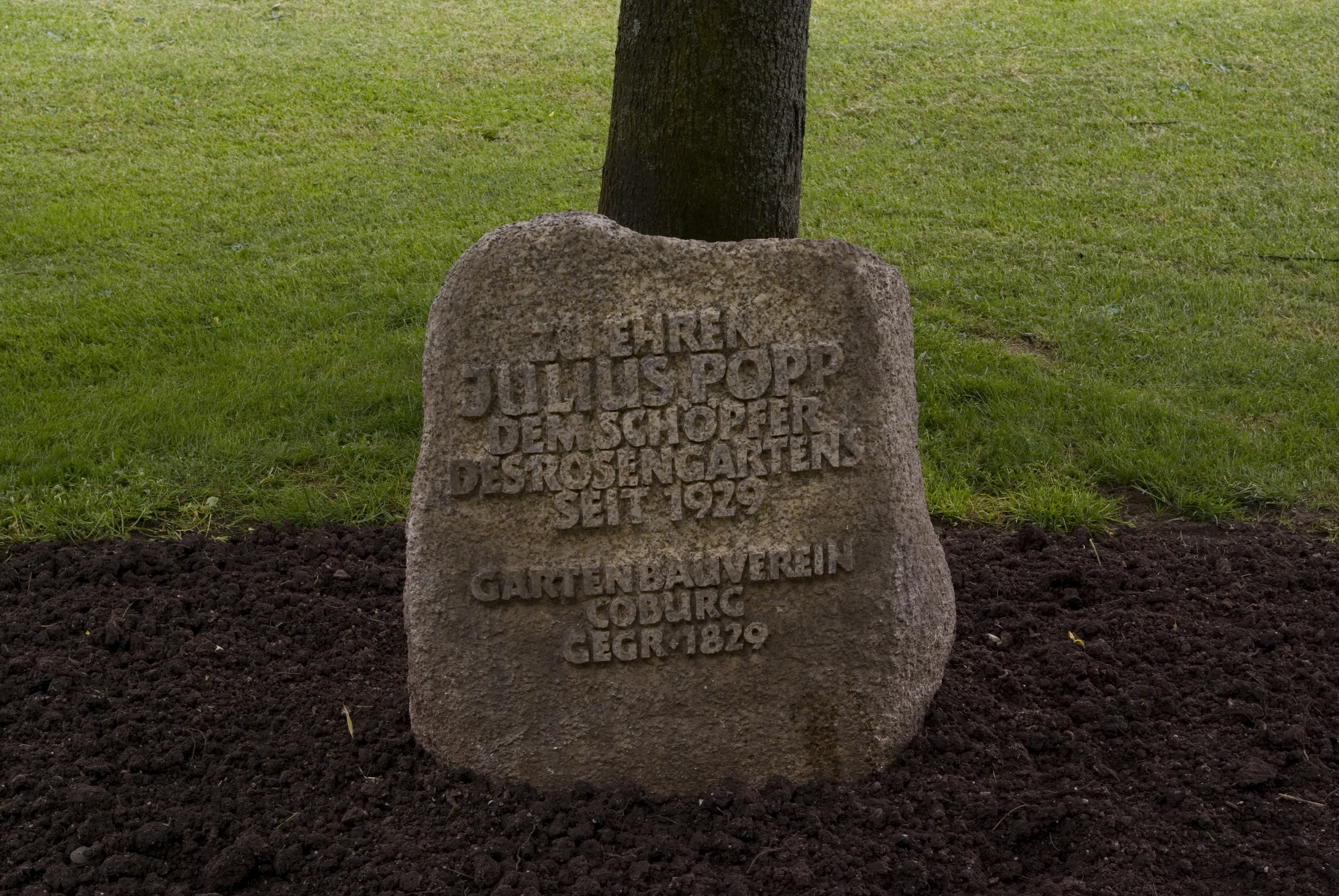
Plaque commemorating Julius Popp
