= Archers (Kirchner) =

Painting by Ernst Ludwig Kirchner

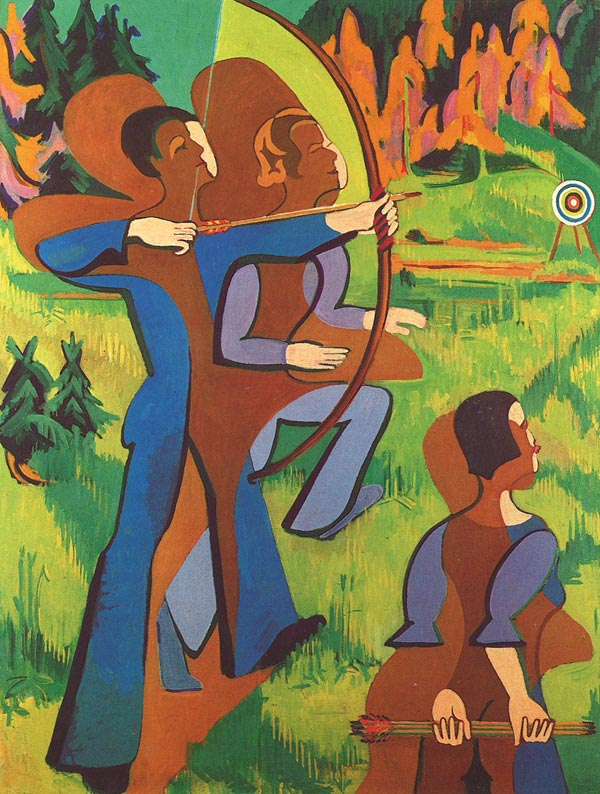
- Artist: Ernst Ludwig Kirchner
- Year: 1935-1937
- Medium: Oil on canvas
- Dimensions: 195 cm × 130 cm (77 in × 51 in)
- Location: Kirchner Museum Davos, Davos

Archers is an oil-on-canvas painting by German painter Ernst Ludwig Kirchner, created in 1935–1937, at his Swiss home town of Davos. It belongs to his last phase, in which he abandoned the Expressionism of his earlier work. The painting depicts three people engaged in the sport of archery. On the back it bears the signature EL Kirchner. The painting is part of the collection of the Kirchner Museum Davos.

== Description ==
The painting shows three people engaged in archery. A female figure in the foreground holds arrows in her hands, while the male figure on the left drawns the bow. The middle figure is shown in a tense posture. What they all have in common is their concentrated gaze directed at the target. The step position forms a pronounced diagonal from bottom left to the target, at top right, which thus forms the vanishing point of the perspective.

== Background and history ==
The motif of a bow shot has long been used in depictions of the martyrdom of Saint Sebastian. It cannot be ruled out that Kirchner alludes to this motif in his painting. A drawing with the same motif appears in an undated letter to fellow painter Erich Heckel, from June 1910. In that drawing, two archers point their arrows at a figure tied to a tree. Thorsten Sadowsky, director and curator of the Kirchner Museum Davos, questions whether if the artist saw himself as a martyr and states that in his drawing, two girls are aiming at Saint Sebastian. In the same letter also appears the drawing of a Crucifixion group. Kirchner may have seen himself in the male role as a passive sexual object. Between 1919 and 1923, Kirchner photographed a peasant girl with a bow and arrow, seen from below, to make her appear larger.

Kirchner's later style, created around 1924, is characterized by a conscious move away from German Expressionism. A sense of abstraction, but also naturalistic echoes, can be seen particularly in the target and determine the composition of the painting. The figures are no longer three-dimensional, as they were in his Expressionist phase, but flat. They also present the shadow areas in brown tones, which are characteristic of Kirchner's late period, and partly appear as some kind of aura of the people or as "shadows in the air". These superimposed color fields form independent, two-dimensional compositional elements within the painting. The American art historian Donald E. Gordon states that the colourfulness of the artist later work is reminiscent of Paul Gauguin.

On November 28, 1935, Kirchner wrote to his patron and collector Carl Hagemann: "Now I am making Archers, a big painting. The large, dark areas, the shadows in the air, are not noticed by the viewer at all [sic!]. They are a new discovery of mine and make the painting calm and monumental. You can still find a lot of things that have never been used in painting." In another letter to Hagemann dated from November 2, 1937, he mentions the 1937 exhibition at the Basler Kunsthalle, the quarrels of the curators there, and that the current painting Archers, would be shown there in a different exhibition of his works than before.
