= Bogenspannerin (Berlin) =

Outdoor sculpture in Berlin, Germany

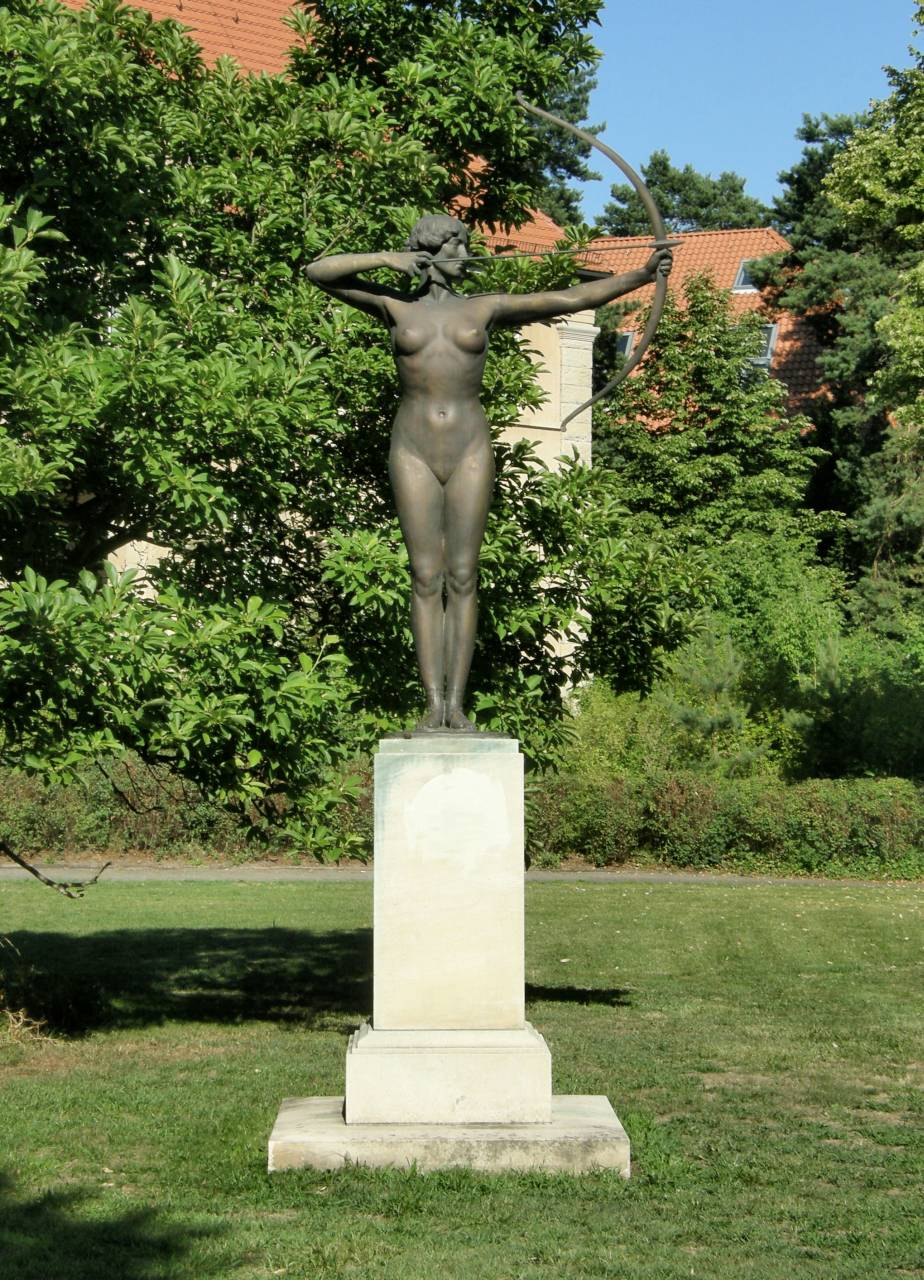
- The sculpture at Hohenzollernplatz, Berlin-Nikolassee in 2008
- Artist: Ferdinand Lepcke
- Medium: Sculpture
- Location: Alte Nationalgalerie, Berlin

Bogenspannerin is a sculpture by Ferdinand Lepcke. One copy is part of the collection of Alte Nationalgalerie in Berlin, Germany. The original version is located in Bydgoszcz (The Archer).

The original statue is located in the Jan Kochanowski Park in Bydgoszcz. A replica of a previous casting lost during the WWII was unveiled on December 12, 1997, at Hohenzollernplatz in Berlin. A replica exists at Heringsdorf on Usedom island. In the vicinity where the copy is exhibited, the family of Ferdinand Lepcke owned a property. A casting of this copy was placed in 1982 at Störtebekerplatz, Wilhelmshaven. A copy exists at the Alte Nationalgalerie in Berlin.
