= Deluge Fountain =

Fountain in Bydgoszcz

- Polish: Fontanna Potop
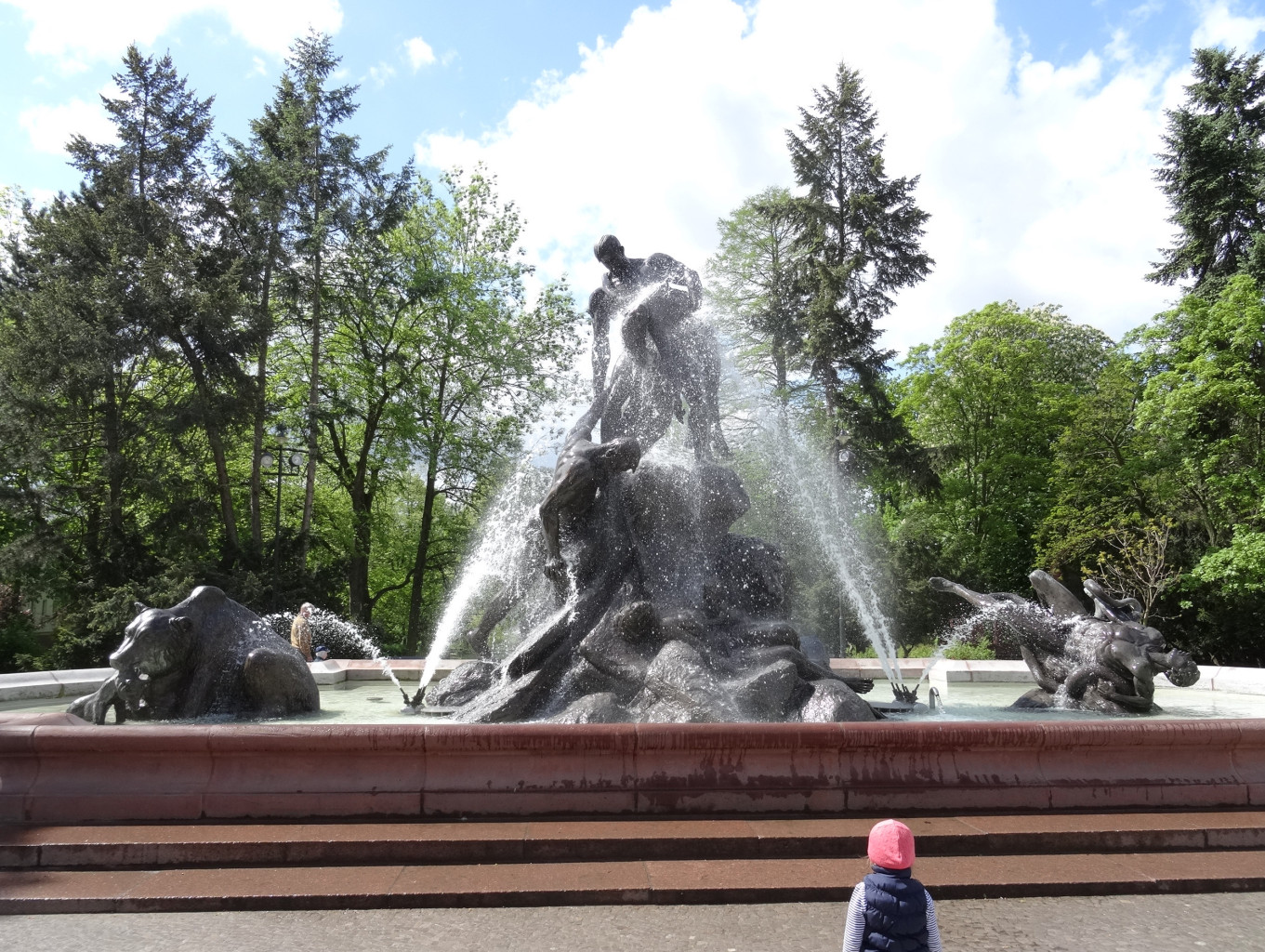
- Potop Fountain
- Interactive map of Deluge Fountain
- Location: Bydgoszcz
- Coordinates: 53°07′34″N 18°00′22″E
- Designer: Ferdinand Lepcke
- Type: Sculpture Fountain
- Material: Bronze
- Height: 6 m (20 ft)
- Beginning date: 1897
- Completion date: 23 July 1904 then 26 June 2014

The Deluge Fountain is a sculpture fountain which stood with all its elements between 1904 and 1943 and since 2014 in Bydgoszcz. Throughout its first existence (39 years) and since its rebuilding, the fountain has always been one of the tourist attractions of the city.

== History ==
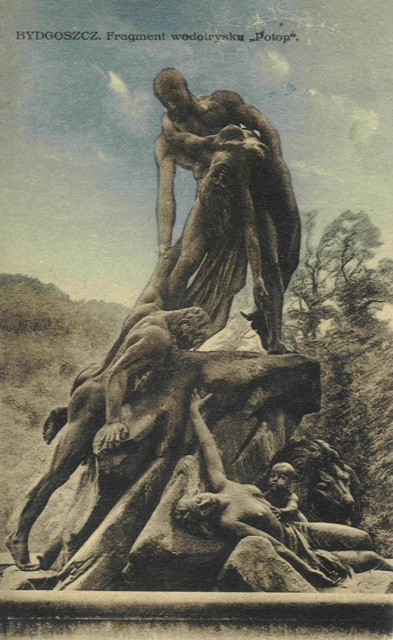
Fountain in Bromberg (Bydgoszcz) c. 1914

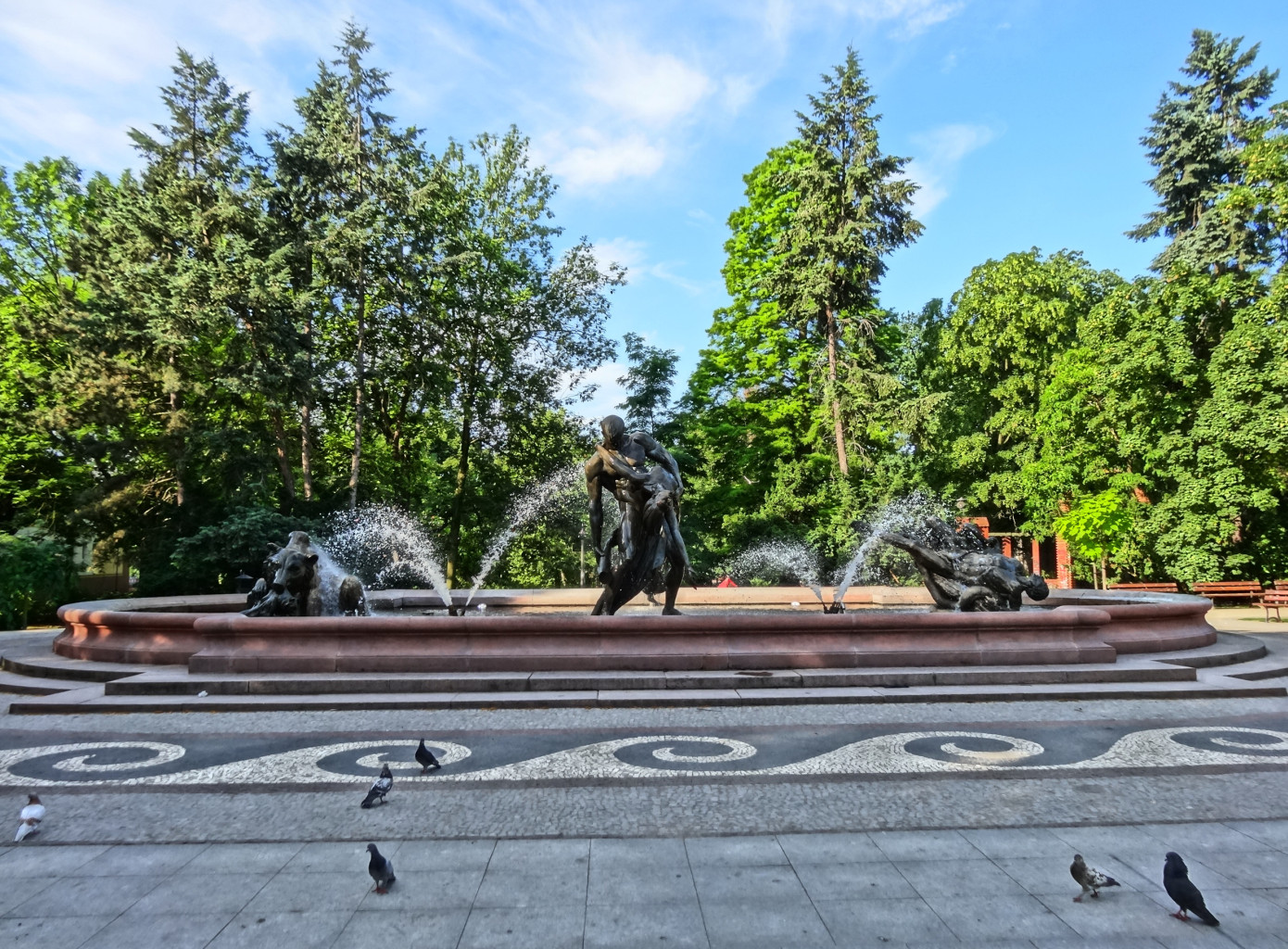
Stub of the fountain before rebuilding - 1 July 2013

The fountain is the result of a competition issued in 1897 by the National Commission for the Promotion of Fine Arts (German: Landes für Kunst Kommission Förderung der Künste Bildende) in Poznań, which theme was water sculptures in Bydgoszcz. The competition received 44 entries and rewarded a Berlin artist, Ferdinand Lepcke (1866–1909).

The construction lasted 6 years. It was built in downtown Bydgoszcz in the Regency Garden (now Park Casimir the Great), separated from the main street by St Peter and St Paul church. The unveiling ceremony took place at 1100 on 23 July 1904, the water system to the fountain being completed later in 1908. The event brought together representatives from Berlin and Poznań and many city residents. In 1908, Ferdinand Lepcke also realized an emblematic statue, The Archer, which stood on the Theatre Square in Bydgoszcz; it is still today the most popular symbol of the city on the Brda and Vistula rivers. The cost of the entire project, according to various sources, ranged between 110 and 200 thousand German Mark.

Deluge Fountain was dismantled on 7 January 1943, when German occupying forces decided to melt down the 8870 kg metal sculpture for use in World War II. After the war only the pool remained, in which the statue was replaced by a fountain by Józef Makowski depicting four stone fish bubbling water.

Deluge Fountain had two copies: in Coburg, Bavaria, the sculptor's hometown, where the sculpture is missing statues on both sides, and in Eisleben, Upper Saxony, which was also melted down in 1942 for war purposes. The Coburg replica has been used as an incomplete but useful blueprint in the reconstruction project.

The process of reconstruction was led by the "Social Committee for the Reconstruction of Bydgoszcz Deluge Fountain" (Polish: Społeczny Komitet Odbudowy Bydgoskiej Fontanny Potop) from 2006 to 2014. The funds were collected from diverse sources: social contributions, the city of Bydgoszcz, province of Kuyavia and Pomerania and the European Union. In April 2009, the first portion of the monument, the bear, was exhibited in the city. In April 2010, the reconstruction of the original, colorful mosaic of the pool with circles and waves shapes, was completed; it was funded by Bydgoszcz city council. On 30 June 2010, the second part of the sculpture returned - a man fighting with a snake. Its sculptor was Michał Pronobis from Radoszyce and its cast, worth over 100,000 zlotys, was made by Jacek Guzera from Kielce.

On 3 October 2012, the central figure returned to its original place. This piece is 3 meters tall and weighs 1,200 kg. In 2014, a new fountain bowl was re-installed together with a water treatment plant and a lighting system. The final element of the fountain, 7 meters tall, was installed on 14 June 2014. The unveiling ceremony took place on June 26, 2014.

In recognizance to this rebirth, the city unveiled a statue of professor Zygmunt Mackiewicz on May 15, 2016, nearby the fountain. Mackiewicz was a famous Bydgoszcz surgeon and initiator of the reconstruction project.

== Elements ==
The statue portrays the culminating moment of the biblical flood: people and animals who are left because they did not find shelter on the ark. The fountain is composed of three independent upstanding parts. The central block features a man, supporting a fainting woman in his left arm, while he strives with his other hand to pull another man up onto the rock. At the foot of the rock is a young mother, dying from exhaustion, but who managed to save her helpless child. A lion also climbs the rock.

The second block figures a lonely bear crawling on the rock, its head facing east and its right paw raised. In its clenched jaws, the bear holds the dead body of a cub. The third part of the sculpture references the Laocoön myth from Greek mythology, featuring a man fighting a contorted sea serpent.

The fountain is 7 meters tall and made of bronze with a total weight of 9 tons. The circular pool wall is made from red sandstone with some Silesian gray granite. The surrounding pavement is arranged in a mosaic.

== Gallery ==
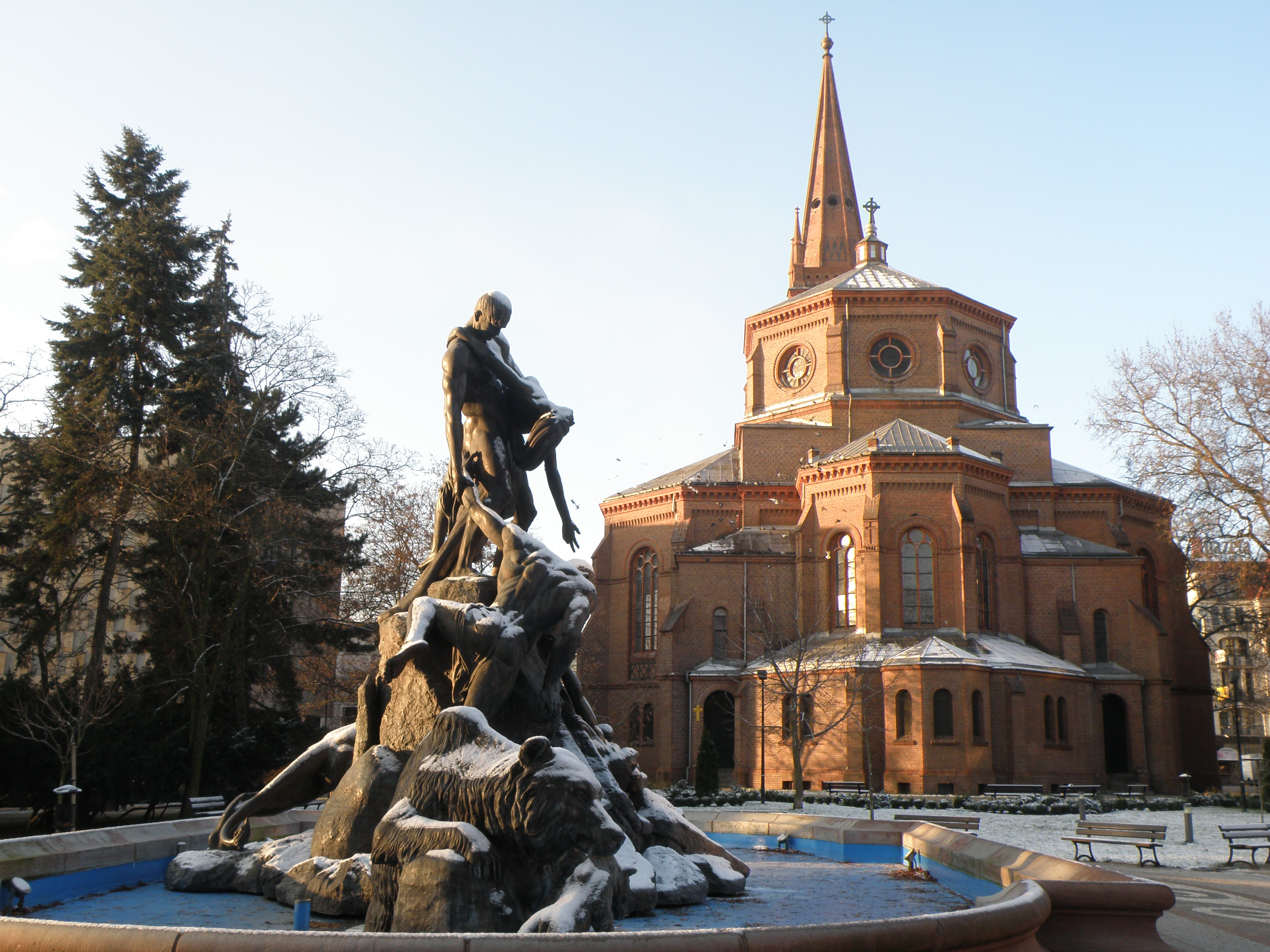
The fountain with St Peter's and St Paul's Church in the backdrop

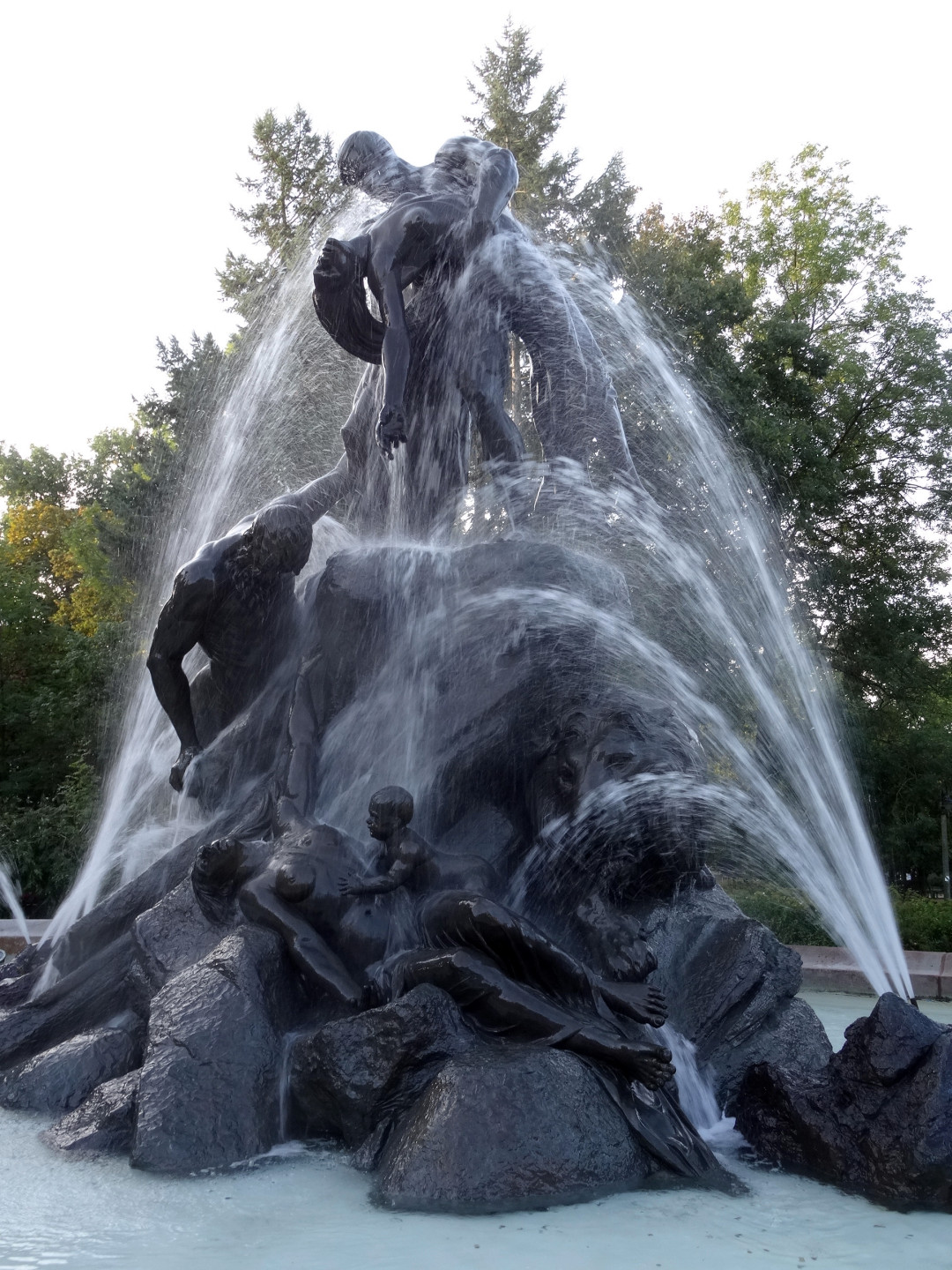
View of the upper elements

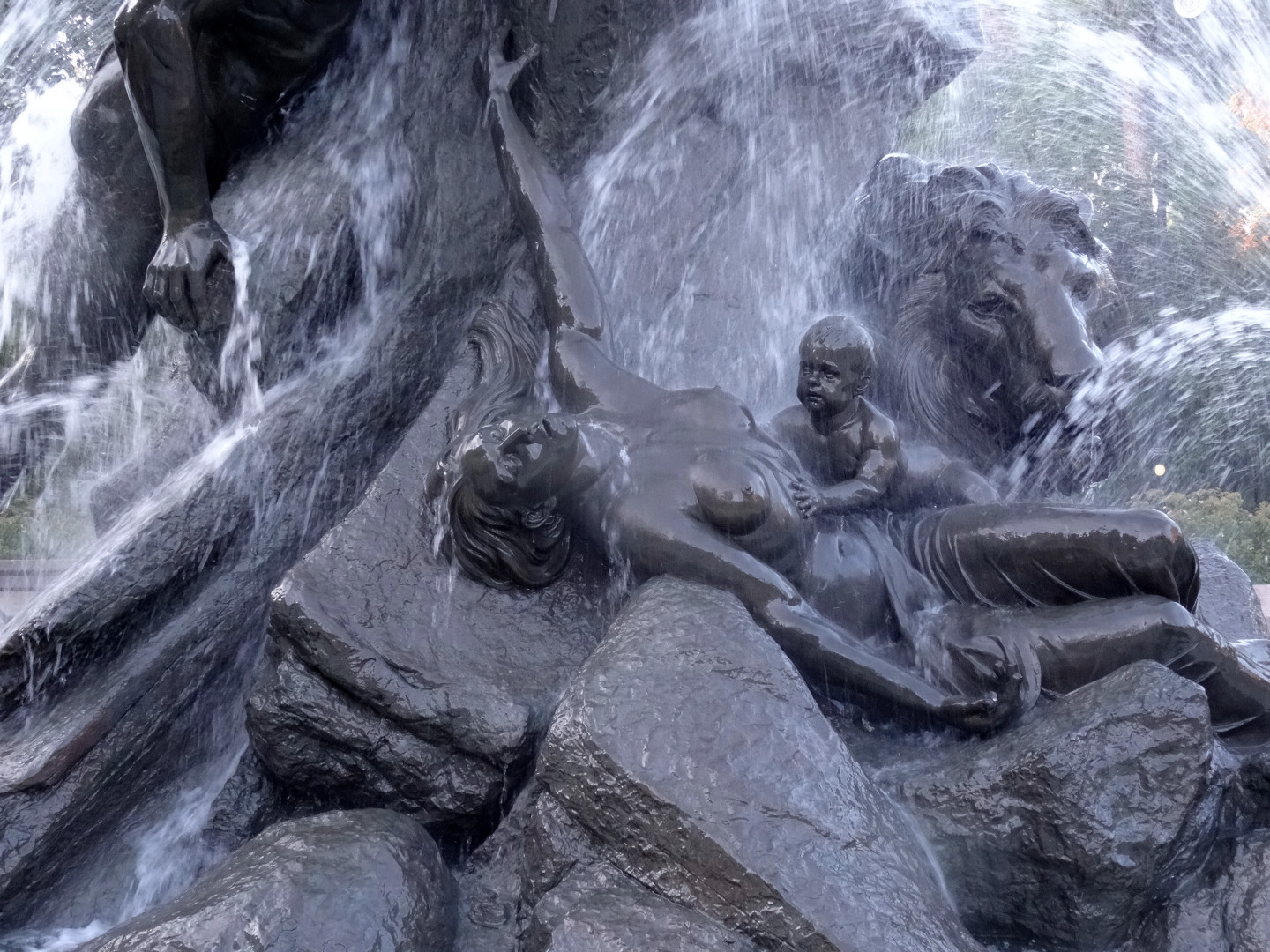
Detail of the bottom

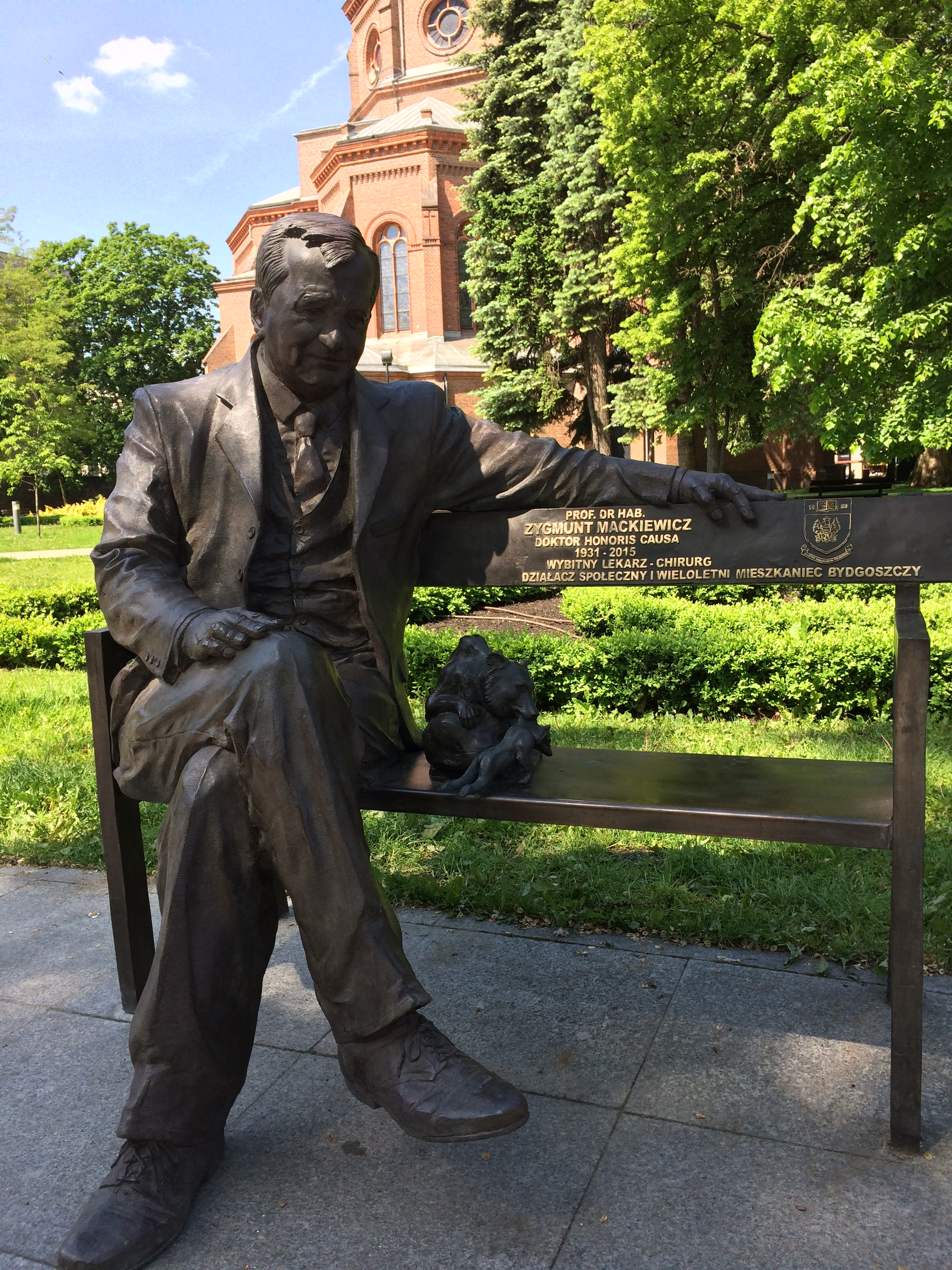
Statue of professor Zygmunt Mackiewicz

== See also ==
- Bydgoszcz
- Freedom Square in Bydgoszcz
- Ferdinand Lepcke
- Casimir the Great Park
- The Archer (Lepcke)

== Bibliography ==
- (in Polish) Stanisław Błażejewski, Janusz Kutta, Marek Romaniuk (2000). Bydgoski Słownik Biograficzny. Tom VI. Bydgoszcz: Kujawsko-Pomorskie Towarzystwo Kulturalne Wojewódzki Ośrodek Kultury. pp. 61–62. ISBN 8385327584.
