= Archar =

Archar may refer to:

- Archar (village), in Bulgaria
- Archar River, in Bulgaria
- Archar Peninsula, in Antarctica

== See also ==
- Archer (disambiguation)
