= Archaea (disambiguation) =

Archaea is a domain of single-celled organisms.

Archaea or archea may also refer to:

- Archaea (spider), an extinct genus of Archaeidae
- Archaea (journal), published by Hindawi
- Archaea Energy, biogas company

== See also ==
- Archaic (disambiguation), an earlier or ancient period or practice
- Archean, or Archæan, an early geological eon
- "archaeo-" ('ancient'), a commonly used taxonomic affixes
- Arcaea, a rhythm game developed and published by lowiro
