= Archaic Period =

The name Archaic Period is given by archaeologists to early periods in an archaeological chronology, generally covering the early developments of permanent settlements, agriculture, and large societies. In particular, it may refer to:

- Archaic Period (Americas) or period in the Americas, after the Lithic and before the Formative. Dates vary with areas, typically 8,000 to 2,000BC.
  - the Archaic period (North America) (8000 BC–1000 BC)
  - Archaic period in Mesoamerica
    - Archaic period (Belize) (8000 BC–2000 BC)
- Archaic Greece (800 BC–480 BC)
  - Archaic period in Greek art
- a period in the history of Etruscan art, between roughly 575 BC and 480 BC
- the Early Dynastic Period (Egypt) (3100 BC–2600 BC)

== See also ==
- Classical period (disambiguation)
