= Archery (disambiguation) =

Archery is the art, sport, practice or skill of using a bow to shoot arrows.

Archery may also refer to:

- Archery, Georgia, an unincorporated community, United States
- Archery (album), a 1982 album by John Zorn

== See also ==
- Archer (disambiguation)
