= Archer, Illinois =

- Unincorporated community
- Location within Illinois Location within the United States
- Coordinates: 39°46′53″N 89°44′09″W
- Country: United States
- State: Illinois
- County: Sangamon
- Elevation: 604 ft (184 m)
- Time zone: UTC-6 (Central (CST))
  - Summer (DST): UTC-5 (CDT)
- Area code: 217
- GNIS feature ID: 422412

Archer is an unincorporated community in Curran Township, Sangamon County, Illinois, United States. Archer is located on the Sangamon Valley Trail on the western border of Springfield.
