= Archer, West Virginia =

Unincorporated community in Wetzel County, West Virginia, U.S.

Archer
- Unincorporated community
- Location within the state of West Virginia Archer (the United States)
- Coordinates: 39°30′38″N 80°35′42″W
- Country: United States
- State: West Virginia
- County: Wetzel
- Elevation: 817 ft (249 m)
- Time zone: UTC-5 (Eastern (EST))
  - Summer (DST): UTC-4 (EDT)
- GNIS ID: 1553739

Archer is an unincorporated community in Wetzel County, West Virginia, United States.
