= Classical period =

Classical period may refer to:

- Classical antiquity, the Greco-Roman world from the 8th century BCE to the 5th century CE
  - Classical Greece, a specific period (c. 510 – c. 323 BCE) within classical antiquity
- Classical India, a period in Indian history (c. 322 – c. 550 CE)
- Classic stage, a period in North American prehistory (c. 500 – c. 1200 CE)
- Classical Islam, a period in Islamic history (various definitions)
- Classical Age of the Ottoman Empire (1453–1566)
- Classical period (music), a period in European music (c. 1750 – c. 1820)
