= Archaea Energy =

Archaea Energy is a US-based company that generates biogas by collection from landfill sites, as a source of renewable energy.

The company was founded in 2018 and based in Canonsburg, Pennsylvania, later moving to Houston. The name Archaea refers to the domain of life, microbes which can act as decomposers and methanogens. It was bought by BP in 2022 for $4.1 billion. As of 2025 it described itself as the largest renewable natural gas producer in the United States. BP in August 2026 advertised that it was looking to sell the company.
