= Kirchner Museum Davos =

Museum in Davos, Switzerland

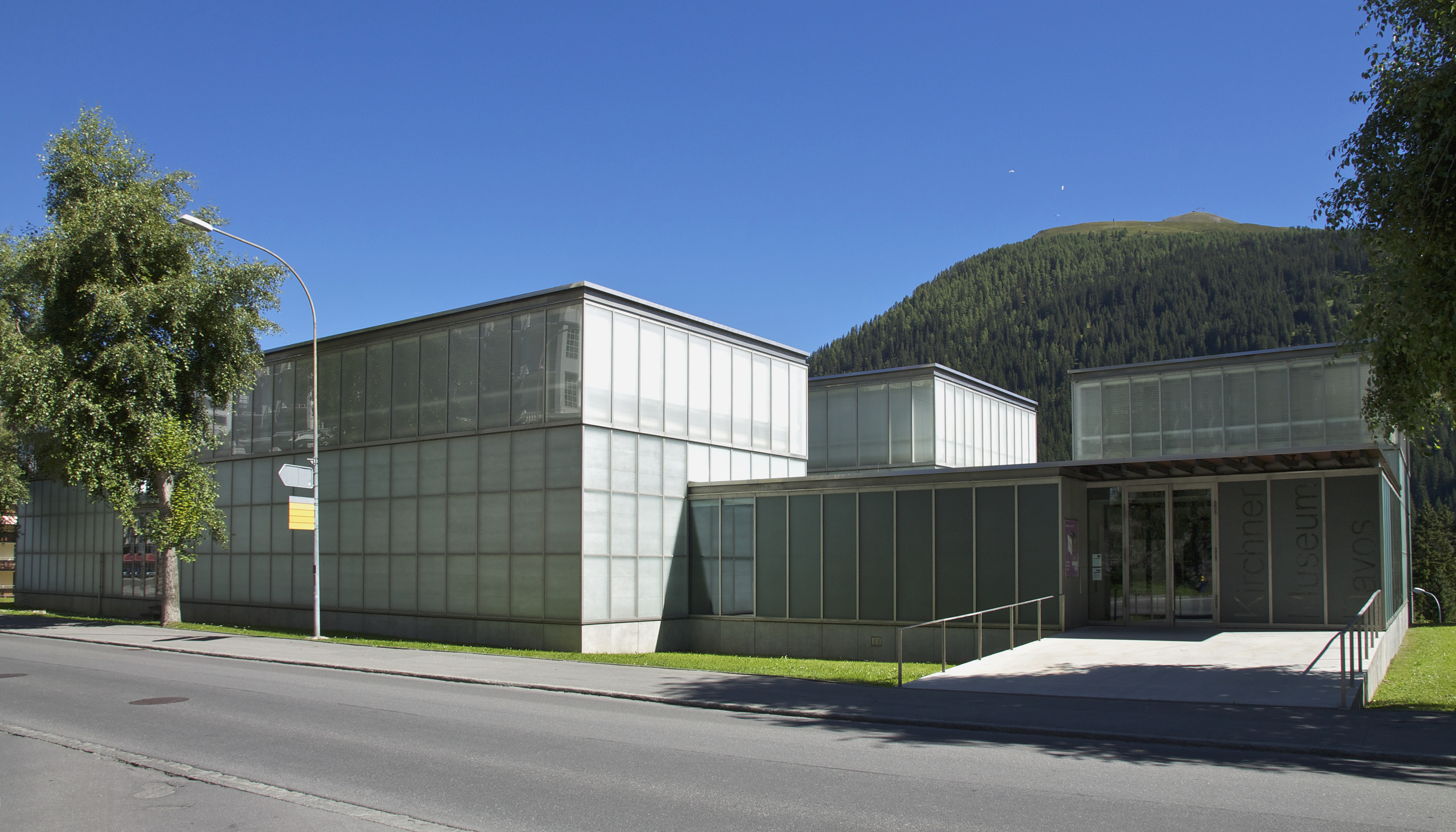
- Northern façade and entrance
- Interactive fullscreen map
- Location: Davos, Switzerland
- Coordinates: 46°48′01″N 9°49′36″E

The Kirchner Museum Davos is an art museum dedicated to the life and work of the German Expressionist artist Ernst Ludwig Kirchner, located in Davos, Switzerland. Kirchner lived in Davos from 1918 to 1938, and was inspired to create many of his works there.

== Collections ==
The collection of the museum includes a large number of artworks by Kirchner, including numerous paintings, sculptures, drawings, prints and textile works, as well as almost all of the artist's sketchbooks and photographs. All the important themes in Kirchner's oeuvre are represented: both studio, nude and circus scenes, portraits, figure and landscape paintings from his Die Brücke period to his late work, while living in Switzerland. The majority of the works of the museum comes from his Davos period, from 1918 to 1938. They reflect Kirchner's constant preoccupation with the mountain world, which impressed him vividly, and also his connection with its inhabitants. There are also in the museum numerous documents on the life and work of the artist and a library on Expressionism.

== History and development ==
The Kirchner Museum was founded in Davos in 1982 and was housed at first in the old post office building in Davos Platz. The Swiss art collector and dealer Eberhard W. Kornfeld, who had already acquired Kirchner's final house on Wildboden in Frauenkirch, near Davos, in the 1960s, and opened there his Kirchner collection to the public, on weekends, was instrumental in setting it up.

On September 4, 1992, a new building, donated by Kirchner's estate administrator, Roman Norbert Ketterer, was opened. The collection included then 519 works. On the occasion of the inauguration of the new building, 500 works and 160 sketchbooks with almost 10,000 drawings, were donated only from the artist's estate. In 1994, another 700 works and numerous surviving negatives of Kirchner's photographs were added.

After renovation work, the exhibition "Thirty Years of the Kirchner Museum Davos: The Collection", was inaugurated in December 2012 on the occasion of the museum's 30th anniversary. In the following exhibitions, Kirchner's work has been brought into dialogue with contemporary art.

In order to reach a broad audience, the museum not only offers guided tours through the exhibitions, but also workshops with programs for children, young people, schoolchildren and adults, and hikes following in Kirchner's footsteps, to the Stafelalp or to his grave in the Davos forest cemetery.

A number of 160 sketchbooks by Kirchner, published in book form in 1996 as a catalog raisonné, are made accessible through complete digitization.

The Kirchner Museum was one of ten Swiss museums to receive financial support from the federal authorities for provenance research in 2016/2017. In regard to the case of Nazi-looted art, around 80 works whose origin isn't fully documented have been selected. These included works by Kirchner and also by Alexej von Jawlensky and Wassily Kandinsky. Then museum director Thorsten Sadowsky explained in 2016 that "We don't want any unlawful acquisitions in our museum inventory".

In a referendum in November 2024, voters rejected a proposal for the city of Davos to invest $4.4 million in an extension to the museum that would have cost $12.7 million in total. Among the private sponsors who had pledged to contribute to the remaining funding were the World Economic Forum and the Ernst Ludwig Kirchner Foundation. In response, German fashion entrepreneur Uwe Holy decided against donating the Ulmberg collection – comprising around 100 works by artists including Kirchner and contemporaries such as Max Beckmann, Emil Nolde and Lyonel Feininger, as well as post-war artists such as Francis Bacon, Pierre Soulages and Louise Bourgeois – to the Kirchner Museum.

== The current building ==
The Kirchner Museum Davos was the first major commission that the Zürich architects Annette Gigon and Mike Guyer carried out. It is considered a pioneering example of a new approach to museum architecture, combining functionality and aesthetics, architectural intrinsic value and service to art. In 2012 it received the Daylight Award from the Velux Foundation, founded in 1980, the most valuable architecture prize in Switzerland.

Based on the regional conditions (climate and light conditions, Davos flat roof architecture), but above all with the idea of an ideal encounter between the visitors and works of art, the architects designed four cubes as exhibition halls. They are connected by a branched foyer with wide window fronts, which is meant as a place for reflection, and at the same time opens up a view of the alpine landscape that was si inspirational for Kirchner. The facade of the museum is completely covered with glass - opaque elements alternating with clear elements. The roof, the so-called 5th facade, is covered with broken glass. In addition to the exhibition rooms and the connecting access hall, there are also in the museums, didactic rooms, a library, a meeting room, offices, workshops, depots and ancillary rooms.

== Foundation and support association ==
The Ernst Ludwig Kirchner Foundation Davos owns both the collection and the museum building. The museum is supported by an association. The Kirchner Association Davos was founded in 1982, and it has around 600 members and institutions. It promotes the content-related work of the museum. The Kirchner Verein Davos actively supports the acquisition of works of art for his collection, the promotion of museum educational activities and publications, and the promotion of research through publications that are created in connection with the collection.

The museum is further supported by a patronage committee, which is made up of personalities whose names support the museum this way.

== See also ==
- List of museums in the Grisons
- List of museums in Switzerland
