= Archer Mobile =

American mobile technology company

Archer Inc.
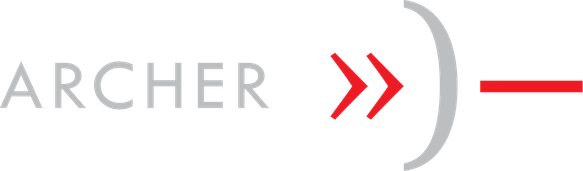
- Industry: Mobile Technology and Services
- Fate: Acquired by IMImobile (2017)
- Headquarters: Seattle, WA
- Area served: Worldwide
- Key people: Matt Harris, CEO
- Products: Mobile messaging design and delivery (MMS and SMS); Mobile web development; Carrier solutions; Mobile applications
- Services: Mobile social integration; Strategic mobile guidance; Mobile CRM solutions; Mobile commerce (include mobile strategy and creative services in this list)

Archer Mobile was a mobile technology company that offered services such as MMS and SMS messaging with the ability to deliver products like mobile coupons, QR codes, Microsoft tags, and mobile bank statements. The company, based in Seattle, WA, was formed from a merger of iLoop Mobile and Lenco Mobile in 2011. Some of the company's work included infrastructure development in Africa, providing mobile messaging products for clients such as African Bank, Standard Bank, the MTN group, and Vodacom. The company also provided the mobile website for the Obama campaign in the 2008 presidential election.

In 2017, Archer was purchased by IMImobile, which was in turn purchased by Cisco Systems in December 2021.
