= Archer, Nevada =

Archer
- Ghost town
- Location in Nevada
- Coordinates: 38°2′41″N 117°11′22″W
- Country: United States
- State: Nevada
- Counties: Nye
- Founded: 1904
- Deserted: 1904

Population
  - Total: 0

Archer is a former mining camp in Nye County, Nevada, that was inhabited in 1904. It was situated 2 miles (3 kilometres) southeast of Tonopah. The mining camp, that only contained tents and no permanent structures or frame buildings, was founded in the summer of 1904, because gold was found there. Archer was gone by the fall, since no additional ledges with gold were found. There are no remains of the mining camp.
