= Ferdinand Lepcke =

Sculptor, Poland, Germany, 19th century

- Born: March 23, 1866; Coburg, Saxe-Coburg and Gotha
- Died: March 12, 1909 (aged 42); Berlin, German Empire
- Resting place: Berlin
- Known for: Sculptor
- Notable work: Deluge Fountain, The Archer
- Style: Sculpting
- Awards

Ferdinand Lepcke (or Lepke; March 23, 1866 – March 12, 1909) was a German sculptor, who in particular realized two major monuments in Bydgoszcz: the Deluge Fountain and The Archer. He received a golden medal at the Great Berlin Art Exhibition and, the Berlin Minister for Spiritual Education and Medical Affairs awarded him the title of professor.

== Life ==
Ferdinand Lepcke was born on March 23, 1866, in Coburg in the Thuringian state of Saxe-Coburg and Gotha, located in today's Bavaria.

The family moved to Berlin at the end of his early childhood. After graduating from gymnasium, Ferdinand started studies at the Berlin Academy of Arts. He stayed there several years, from 1883 and 1890. During two years (1888–1890), he studied under the guidance of artist professor Fritz Schaper. He additionally honed his skills in the sculpture atelier of the Biber brothers and in the Kunstgewerbemuseum studio of the German capital.

He cherished the neoclassical style, had become ubiquitous in Germany since the mid-1850s with pioneers such as Johann Gottfried Schadow (1764–1850) and Christian Daniel Rauch (1777–1857). Actually, Lepcke felt closer to the spirit of the old masters than the trendy Art Nouveau. In his late years, however, he acknowledged his interest in nascent movements such as Jugendstil or Art Deco. This attachment to classical sculpture emanated from his passion for Antiquity.

In 1893, at the age of 27, he was awarded by the Prussian Academy of Arts the great state prize, consisting of a scholarship year in Rome: there he could refine his knowledge of ancient sculpture. Further study trips took him France and Copenhagen, Denmark. At this time, he was already a valued artist and a sought-after sculptor.

In 1895, Charles Alexander, Grand Duke of Saxe-Weimar-Eisenach awarded Ferdinand Lepcke the Knight's Cross of the Order of the White Falcon.

In 1897, Ferdinand moved back to Berlin and took the position of professor at the Academy of Arts. He was admitted to the artistic group of the Berliner Künstverein.

In 1903, the artist received a golden medal at the Great Berlin Art Exhibition. On June 8, 1905, the Berlin Minister for Spiritual Education and Medical Affairs awarded him the title of professor.

Ferdinand Lepcke died of pneumonia on March 19, 1909, in Berlin, at the age of 42.

== Notable works ==
Lepcke created small artworks (like busts) as well as large monuments.

- Busts of Andreas Sigismund Marggraf and Franz Karl Achard (1892), placed on a building at 10 Dorotheenstrasse in Berlin until 1945. Moved to the Berlin Sugar Museum;
- Statue of Justus Jonas in the Castle Church of Wittenberg (1892);
- Bildhauer (English: The sculptor), statue, sandstone (1893) bought by the Berlin National Gallery and placed in the columned hall in February 1897. Lost;
- Die Schreibende (English: The writer), plaster (1894)
- Bust of Adolph Paalzow (1894);
- Bust of Mr. Strohl-Fern, plaster (1895);
- Bust of Professor Dr. Fritsch (1897);
- Böses Gewissen (English: Bad conscience), bronze (1898);
- Herm of Friedrich Rückert, Carrara marble (1899), Berlin Viktoriapark;
- Überrascht (English: Surprised), bronze group (1899);
- Riesenspielzeug (English: Giant Toys), female figure (1903);
- Kuß (English: The Kiss), bronze (1900), Regional Museum in Bydgoszcz;
- "Bust of Ernst Ewald", plaster (1903);
- The Deluge, fountain (1903):
  - Original monument unveiled on July 23, 1904, in Bromberg. It was melted down in 1943 then rebuilt in 2014;
  - A copy of the main figures was placed in Coburg in 1906.
  - A reduced copy of all three groups of figures was placed in Eisleben in 1916. The ensemble was melted down in 1942;
- Wiedersehen (English: Goodbye), bronze (1904), Hermitage Museum, Saint Petersburg. 60-cm high replicas are proposed by the "Lauchhammer Art Foundry". A small bronze copy stands at the Regional Museum in Bydgoszcz;
- Bust of the painter A. Meyer, plaster (1904);
- Tänzerin (English: Dancer) (1905), Coburg Art Collections;
- Bust of Frau Banker Wagner, bronze (1905);
- Bogenspannerin (English: The Archer), bronze (1905):
- Heimkehr (English: Homecoming), bronze (1907);
- Bust of F. von Strantz, plaster (1907);
- Phryne (1907–1908), Kleiner Rosengarten, Coburg;
- Phryne, bronze (1907–1908), Schlachtensee, lost. A replica realized in 2007 by the "Lauchhammer Art Foundry" is standing in the forecourt of the Berlin-Nikolassee station;
- Bismarck, bronze relief (1908), Bismarck tower of Hildburghausen;
- Memorial for Ernst von Stubenrauch (1909), Teltow;
- Wasserschöpfende (English: Water scooping), bronze (1909).

== Awards and recognition ==
- Prussian Academy of Arts state prize in 1893.
- Knight's Cross of the Order of the White Falcon in 1895.
- Golden medal at the 1903 Great Berlin Art Exhibition.
- In Bydgoszcz, Lepcke designed and created two of the most famous landmarks of the city:
  - the statue of The Archer (German: Bogenspannerin-Polish: Łuczniczka). Unveiled in 1910, the naked sculpture, displayed in the downtown of Bromberg, aroused a lot of emotions and words of indignation. After the re-creation of the Polish state in 1918, the artwork was told to have been "intentionally set by the Prussian invader to scandalize Polish society";
  - The Deluge (German: Sintflutbrunnen-Polish: Fontanna Potop), a monumental fountain in the Park "Casimir the Great".
- In addition to the exhibitions in his native city of Coburg, Ferdinand Lepcke was the center of an exposition in Bydgoszcz, from December 18, 2014, to March 15, 2015, in the Regional Museum in Bydgoszcz located on Mill Island.

== Gallery ==
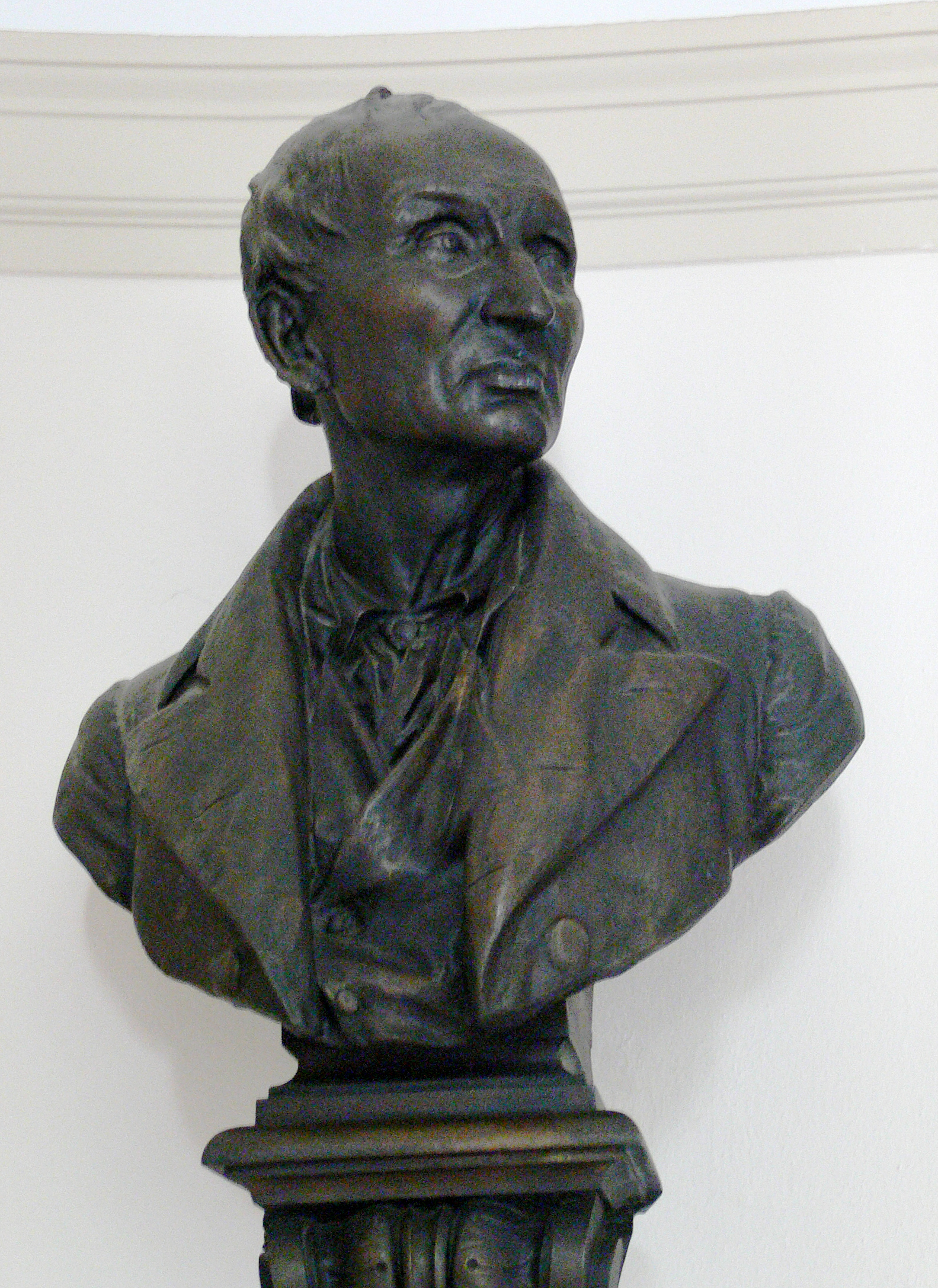
Bust of A.S. Marggraf (1892)

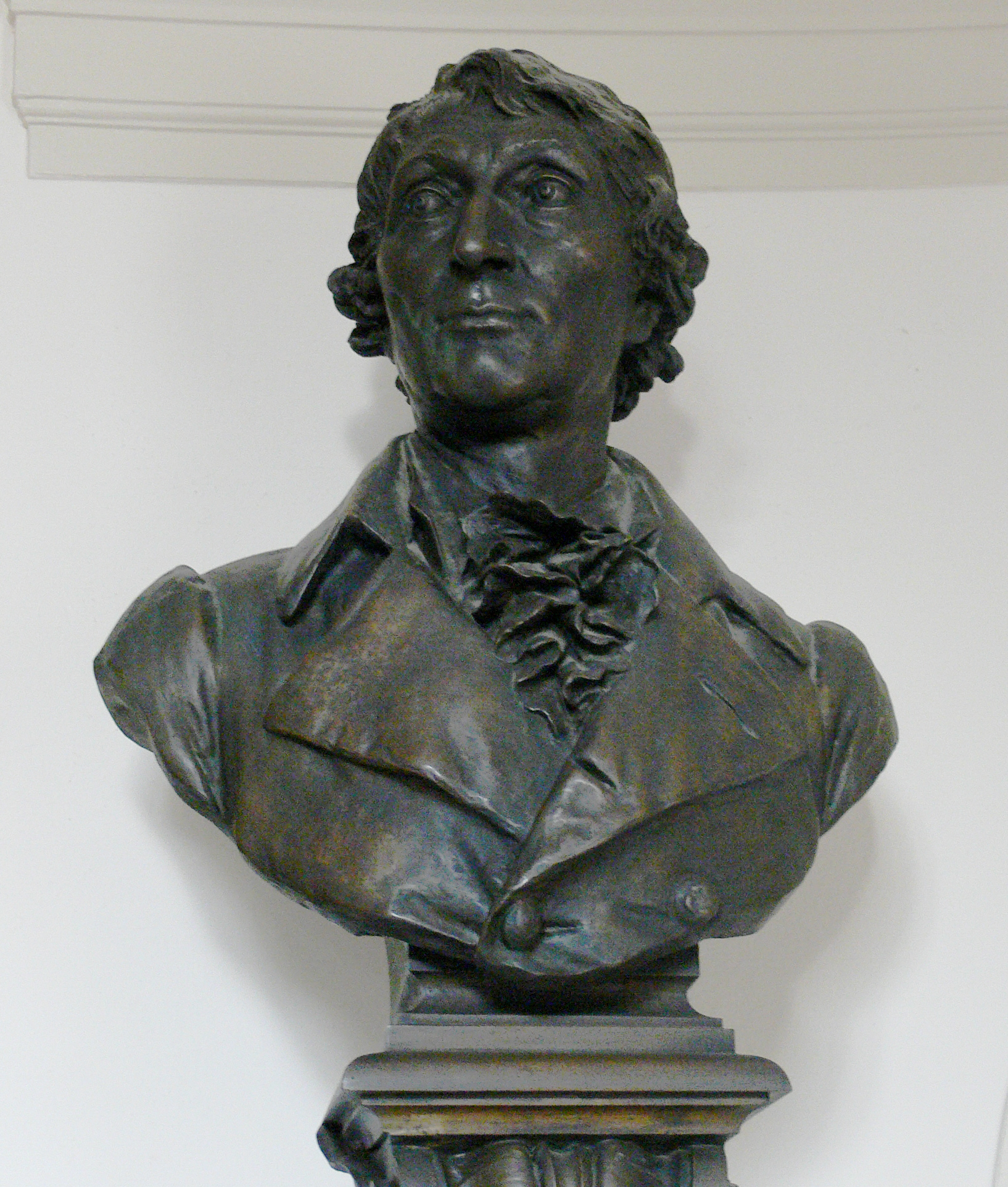
Bust of F.C. Achard (1892)

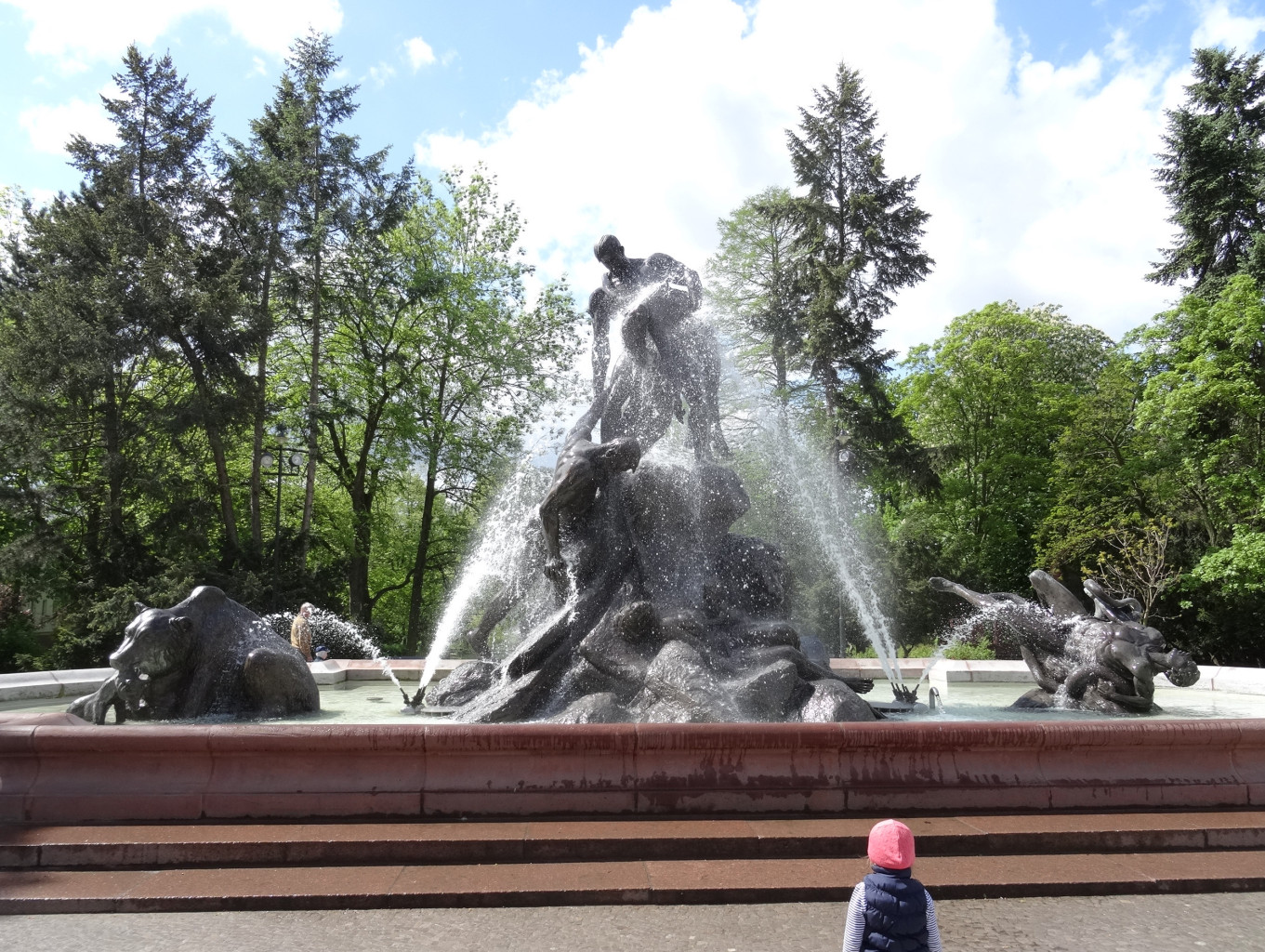
The Deluge (1908, re-cast in 2014)

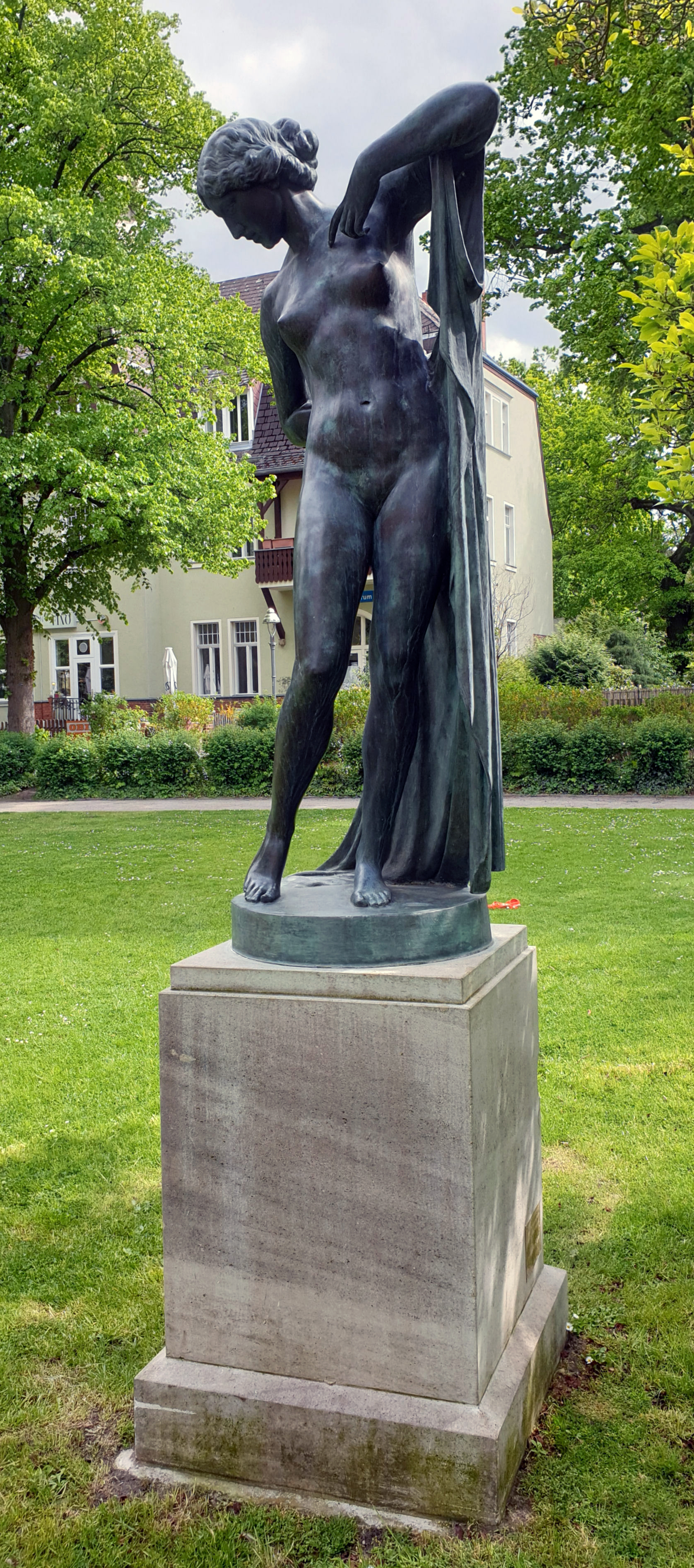
Phryne, 2007 replica of the 1907 statue

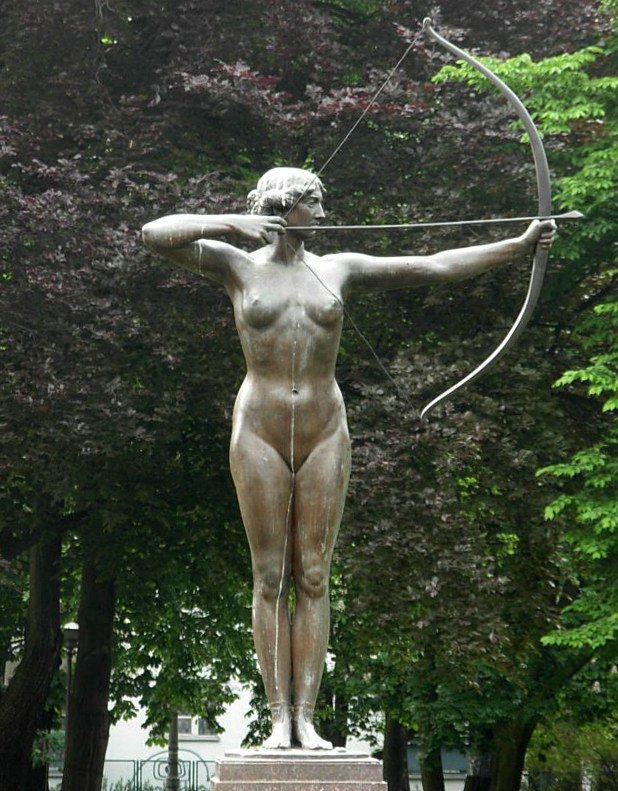
The Archer (1908)

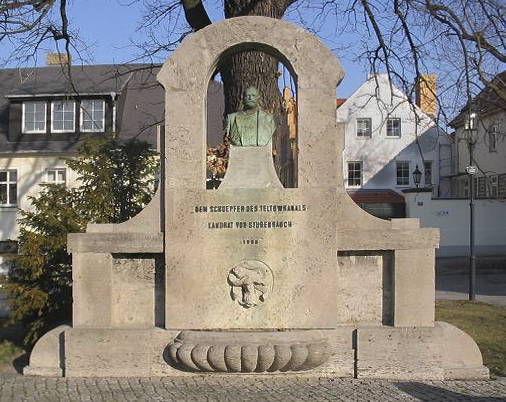
Memorial for Ernst von Stubenrauch (1909)

== See also ==
- Bydgoszcz
- Deluge Fountain
- The Archer, Bydgoszcz
- Rose Garden, Coburg
- List of Polish people

== Bibliography ==
- (in German) Nicky Heise, Susanne Kähler, Klaus Weschenfelder (2012). Ferdinand Lepcke (1866–1909). Monographie und Werkverzeichnis. Coburg: Kunstsammlungen der Veste Coburg. ISBN 9783874720922.
- (in German) Nicky Heise, Susanne Kähler, Inga Kopciewicz, Stefan Pastuszewski, Marek Romaniuk, Klaus Weschenfelder (2014). Ferdinand Lepcke 1866–1909. Bydgoszcz. ISBN 9788363572921.
- (in German) Heise, Nicky (2014). Ferdinand Lepcke. Allgemeines Künstlerlexikon. Berlin: Band 84, de Gruyter. p. 160. ISBN 9783110231892.
- (in German) Heise, Nicky (2016). Ferdinand Lepcke (1866–1909) – Ein Berliner Bildhauer um 1900. Das Teltower Land. Heimat-Magazin 2015/16. Berlin: Buchkontor Teltow. pp. 149–164. ISBN 9783981586541.
- (in Polish) Błażejewski Stanisław, Kutta Janusz, Romaniuk Marek (2000). Bydgoski Słownik Biograficzny. Tom VI. Bydgoszcz: Kujawsko-Pomorskie Towarzystwo Kulturalne Wojewódzki Ośrodek Kultury. pp. 61–62. ISBN 8385327584.
- (in Polish) Piotr Winter, Jerzy Derenda (1996). Bydgoska Łuczniczka i jej kopie. Bydgoszcz: Towarzystwo Miłośników Miasta Bydgoszczy. ISBN 8390323141.
