= The Archer (Lepcke) =

- pl: Łuczniczka, de: Bogenspannerin
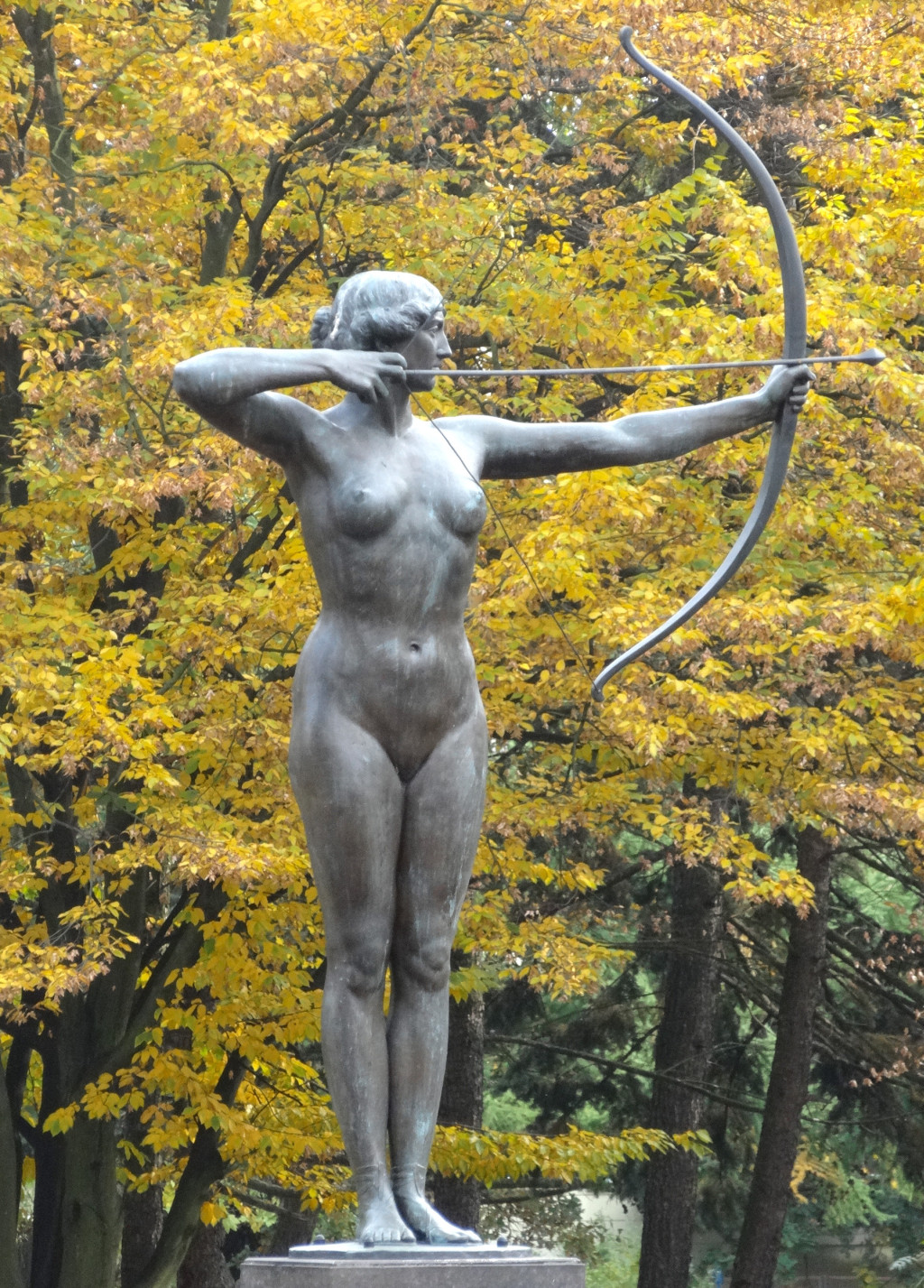
- View in Jan Kochanowski Park
- Artist: Ferdinand Lepcke (1866-1909)
- Completion date: 18 October 1910
- Medium: bronze
- Movement: Neoclassicism
- Subject: Young naked woman, tightening bow
- Dimensions: 175 cm × 105 cm (69 in × 41 in)
- Location: Bydgoszcz
- 53°07′50″N 18°00′44″E
- Owner: City of Bydgoszcz

The Archer or Archeress (Polish: Łuczniczka, German: Bogenspannerin) is a sculpture in Bydgoszcz, Poland. It stands in the Jan Kochanowski Park, facing the Polish Theatre. It is one of the oldest preserved sculptures in the city, realized by Ferdinand Lepcke. The figure of The Archer is one of the most expressive symbols of Bydgoszcz. Four copies of the statue still exist in German cities.

== Description ==
The statue has been designed by Berlin artist Ferdinand Lepcke. It is made of bronze and portrays a young naked woman, stretching a bow.

The silhouette has classic proportions and athletic body. The character only wears Roman-like sandals, and stands on a pedestal made of pink granite. Dimensions of the sculpture are: 210 cm (height), 128 cm (width), 35 cm (depth). The archer figure itself is 175 cm tall, 77 cm at waist and 105 cm at hip.

== History ==
The sculpture was probably created in 1908, and was one of Ferdinand Lepcke's last works, as he died of pneumonia at the age of 42 on 12 March 1909, in Berlin. The Archer was exhibited in Munich and Berlin, attracting great interest from professionals and visitors, and receiving praises in the press. Pictures of the work were also published in several professional art magazines. The miniature version, 80 centimetres (31 in) tall, made from gypsum, was exhibited in Bromberg in May 1910, at the exhibition organized by the German Society of Arts and Sciences in Bromberg (German: Deutsche Gesellschaft für Kunst und Wissenschaft). While visiting the exhibition a local magnate had the idea of purchasing a copy of the sculpture. This patron was a Bromberg Jewish banker and philanthropist, Lewin Louis Aronsohn. He personally decided to fund the acquisition of the original piece of art.

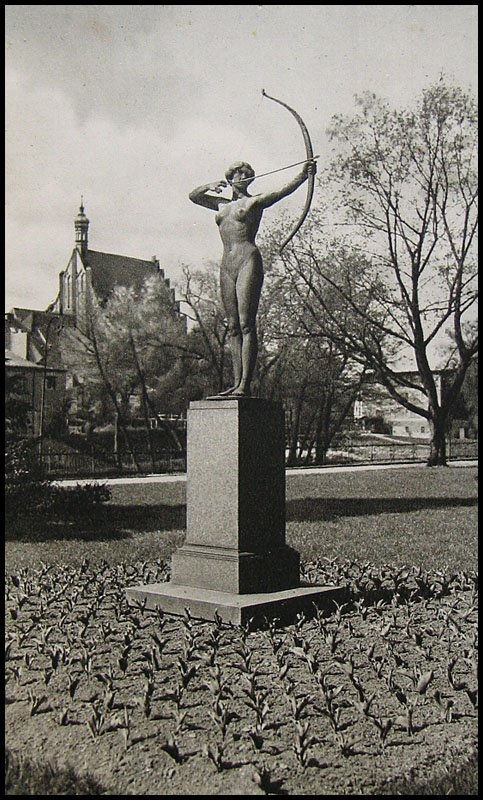
The statue in its original location c. 1920

The cost for Louis Aronsohn was 7,500 German gold mark. The Mayor of the city, Hugo Wolff, went to Berlin, to approach Lepcke's late brother and buy the original masterpiece, not one of several copies the artist had made. Hugo Wolff had entertained good relationship with Ferdinand Lepcke since the sculptor designed the colossal fountain The Deluge (Polish: potop) installed on Freedom Square in 1904. The statue arrived in Bromberg on August 26, 1910: the official unveiling ceremony took place on October 18, 1910, in the garden-cafe Teatralce, at the occasion of the 60th birthday of Louis Aronsohn. The figure was then moved to a pedestal standing in the middle of a flowery square, on Theatre Square, next to the Municipal Theatre. The Archer was aiming at the side wall of the theatre, parallel to Mostowa Street.

The naked silhouette standing in the middle of the city aroused much emotion and discussion in the Polish society of the newly reborn Poland during interwar period. The same arguments appeared in Berlin where a copy was exposed in 1908. During religious holidays, the statue was screened or dressed so as not to distract participants in the processions. On the opposite, 20-year old movie star Pola Negri was among the strongest supporters of the neoclassical statue, while living in Bydgoszcz. In 1928, city councilors tried to pass a resolution requesting the withdrawal of the monument, claiming that it was a symbol of the Prussian power.

A proposal was made to erect a statue of Jesus Christ in its place, since it stood on the ancient plot of the monastery and church of the Carmelites.

But people sobered up when Cyryl Ratajski, president of Poznań, proposed to purchase The Archer back for its city if the bill was passed. Hence the monument survived, but it was moved anyhow further away from the street around 1925, deeper into Theatre Square and closer to the river, avoiding direct eye contact with city inhabitants.

In autumn 1939, German forces moved the statue back to its previous place near the street, where it stayed until 1945. During fighting in January 1945, the figure was slightly damaged by gunshot in the back, on the hands and feet. However, it survived the fire and the destruction of the Municipal Theatre. In May 1948, The Archer was restored under the expertise of local sculptor Piotr Triebler.

In 1955, the sculpture was moved to a square next to the district museum on Gdańska Street, and in 1960, to the Jan Kochanowski Park, in front of the Polish Theatre. This move was linked to the planned re-construction on Theatre Square of the Freedom Monument of Plac Wolności, however the project never took shape, and The Archer stayed where one can admire it. Further preservation works happened in 1987 and 1990, to clean from corrosion the figure and the arrow.

The Archer, over time, gained more and more sympathy from the inhabitants of Bydgoszcz, visitors and tourists.

On 19 April 2013, to celebrate the 667th anniversary of the city charter, a new statue, the "Archer Nova" was unveiled, referring to Archer's original figure: it stands on a sphere, with its head slightly inclined, eyes closed, athletic body bent backward. It is visible on the yard facing the main entry of the Opera Nova. The sculpture was created by Maciej Jagodziński-Jagenmeer, from Toruń. It is made of bronze and covered with chromium, weighs 200 kg and is 1.8m tall - five centimeters more than the original Archer.

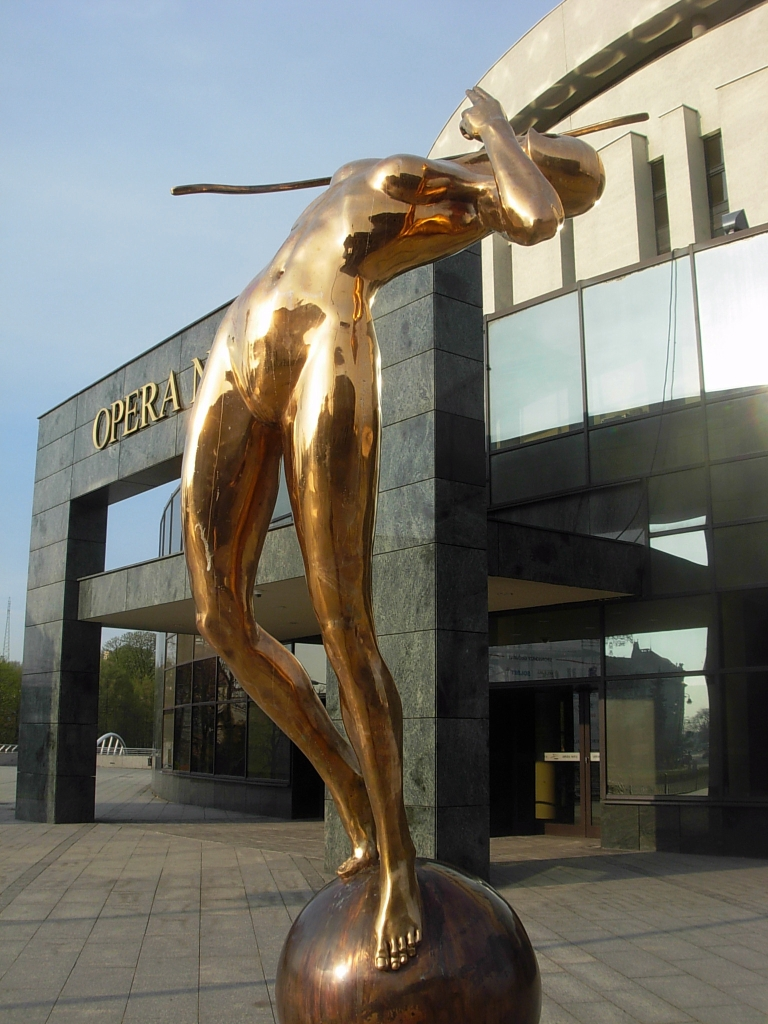
Łuczniczka Nova in 2015

== Other copies ==
While the original statue by Ferdinand Lepcke has been purchased to be displayed in Bydgoszcz, few copies have been realized and sent to the following cities:

- Coburg, hometown of Ferdinand Lepcke, in the north of Bavaria. The Archer copy still stands today in the park of the city;
- Berlin, where a copy called Bogenspannerin has been bought in 1908–1909. It stood opposite the train station near the town hall, but was damaged during World War II and scrapped in 1947. In 1994, a social initiative in favor of the reconstruction of the sculpture succeeded to have it recast. This archer has been standing since 1997 on Museum Island in Kolonnaden.;
- Heringsdorf, on Usedom island. The copy is a decoration of the park, and is still standing today in front of the Diana hotel. This Archer belonged to Ferdinand Lepcke's family, as was the sea resort Diana;
- Wilhelmshaven, the sculpture has been unveiled on 18 June 1982. This copy, made from Coburg's statue, has been fundraised by an association (German: Bidegast Vereinigun) of Germans from Bydgoszcz.

== A Bydgoszcz icon ==
The archer is widely considered to be a work of great artistic beauty, as critics in the interwar period have already noticed. Wojciech Rzeźniacki, a journalist, wrote in the 1930s: "[...] The Archer is an unmatched work of art. The way to focus the viewer's attention on the illusory aim of the arrow - absolve the artist who did not hesitate to present his modern Artemis in all her naked beauty. The tension of the muscles does not, however, reduce the charm of its shape. On the contrary, the attitude in which The Archer tightens the bow allowed the artist to develop all the noble harmony and symmetry of the statue."

The statue of Archer is connected with many literary works of local writers, as well as artists and photographers.

Today it is not known who was the model for The Archer figure. According to anecdotes disseminated in the press and in literature of the time, it could be:

- A girlfriend of Heinrich Seeling, founder of Former Municipal Theatre;
- Julia, Lewin Louis Aronsohn's daughter;
- One of Ferdinand Lepcke's models from Berlin.

Nowadays, the figure is one of the most important symbols of Bydgoszcz. Its image is used on stamps, badges and publications devoted to the city.

Statuettes of The Archer are handed out to participants of city competitions, events and festivals. In 2002, the name Łuczniczka has been given to the newly built sports and show arena. Bydgoszcz american football team bears the name of Bydgoszcz Archers, in reference to the sculpture.

== Gallery ==
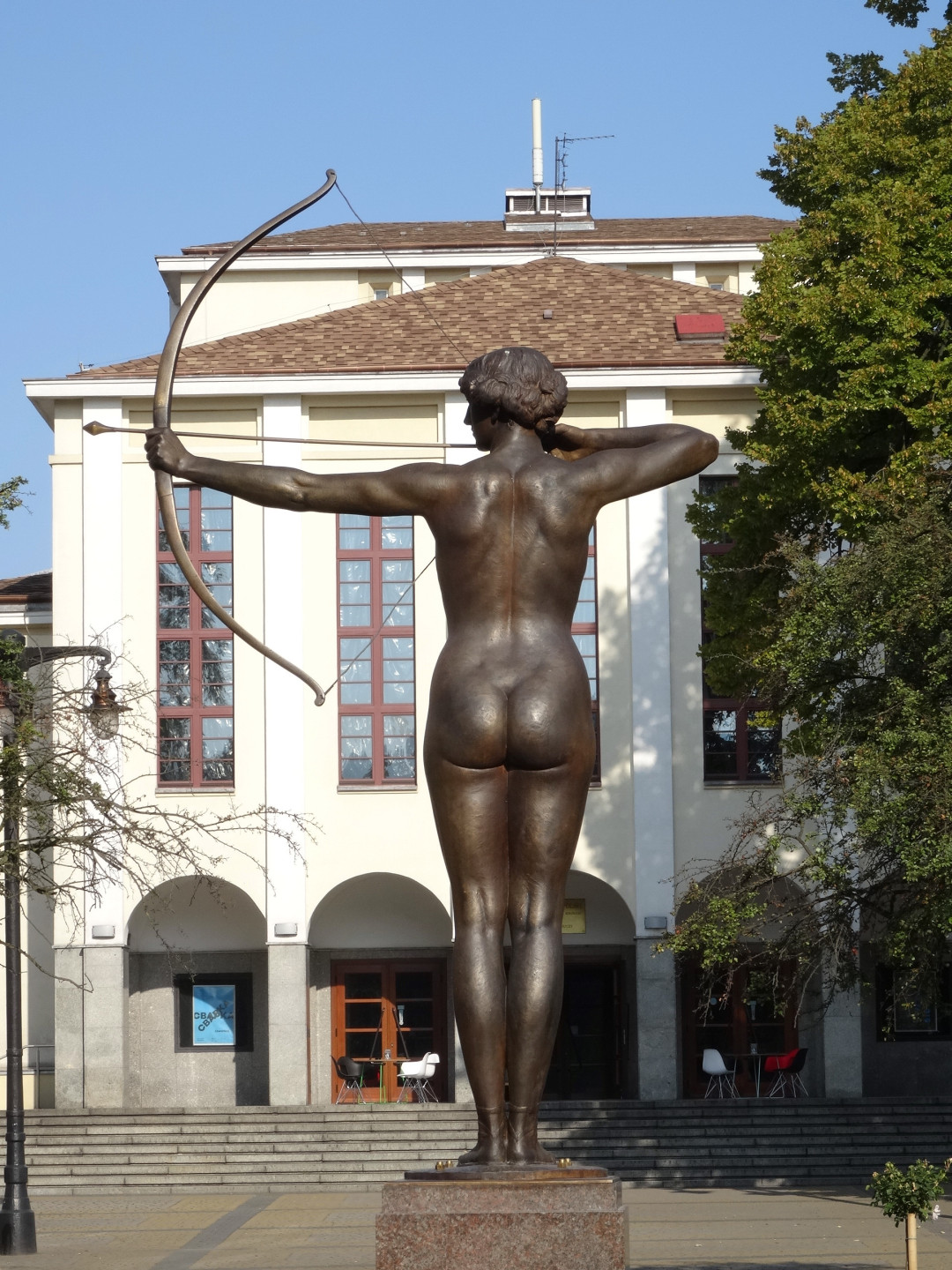
The Teatr Polski in the backdrop

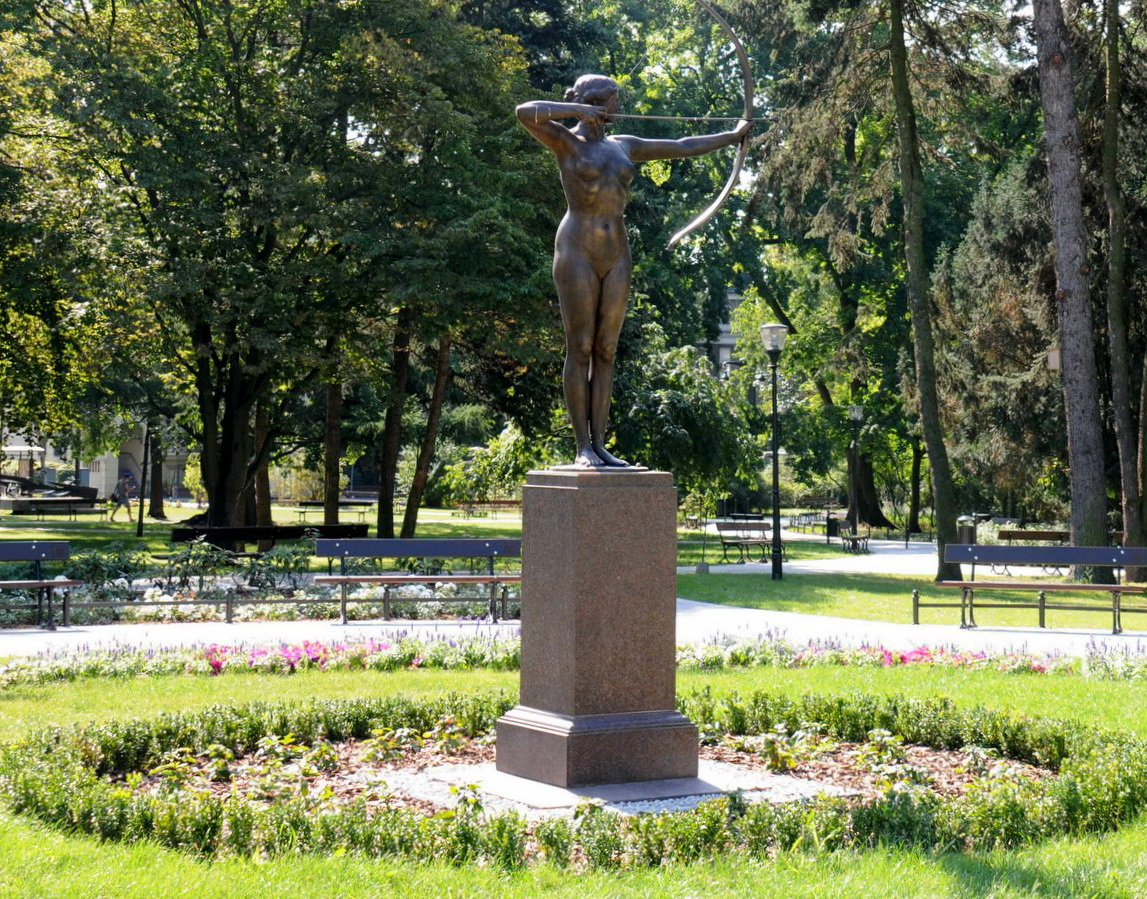
The statue and the flowerbed

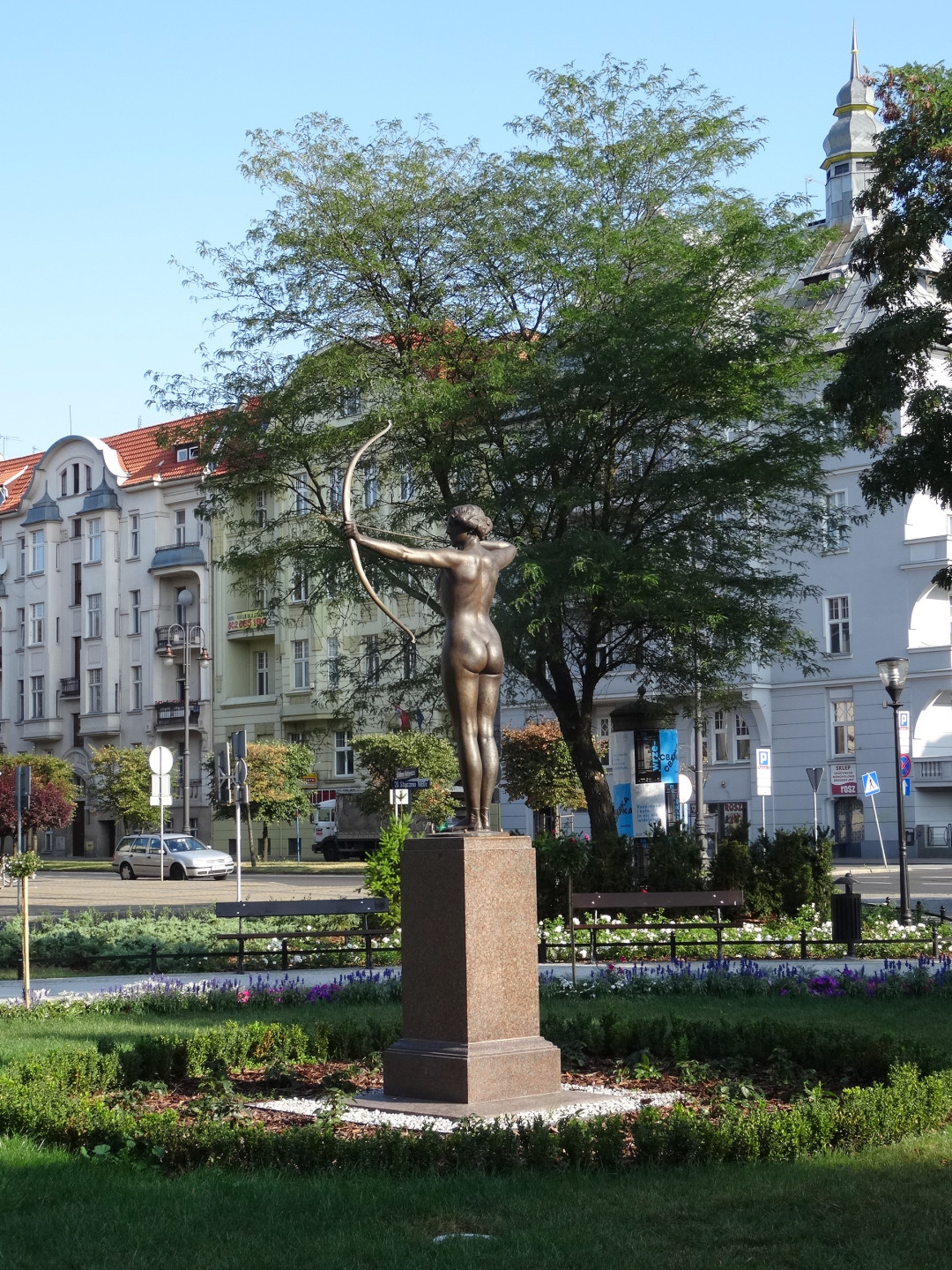
View of Adam Mickiewicz Alley in the background

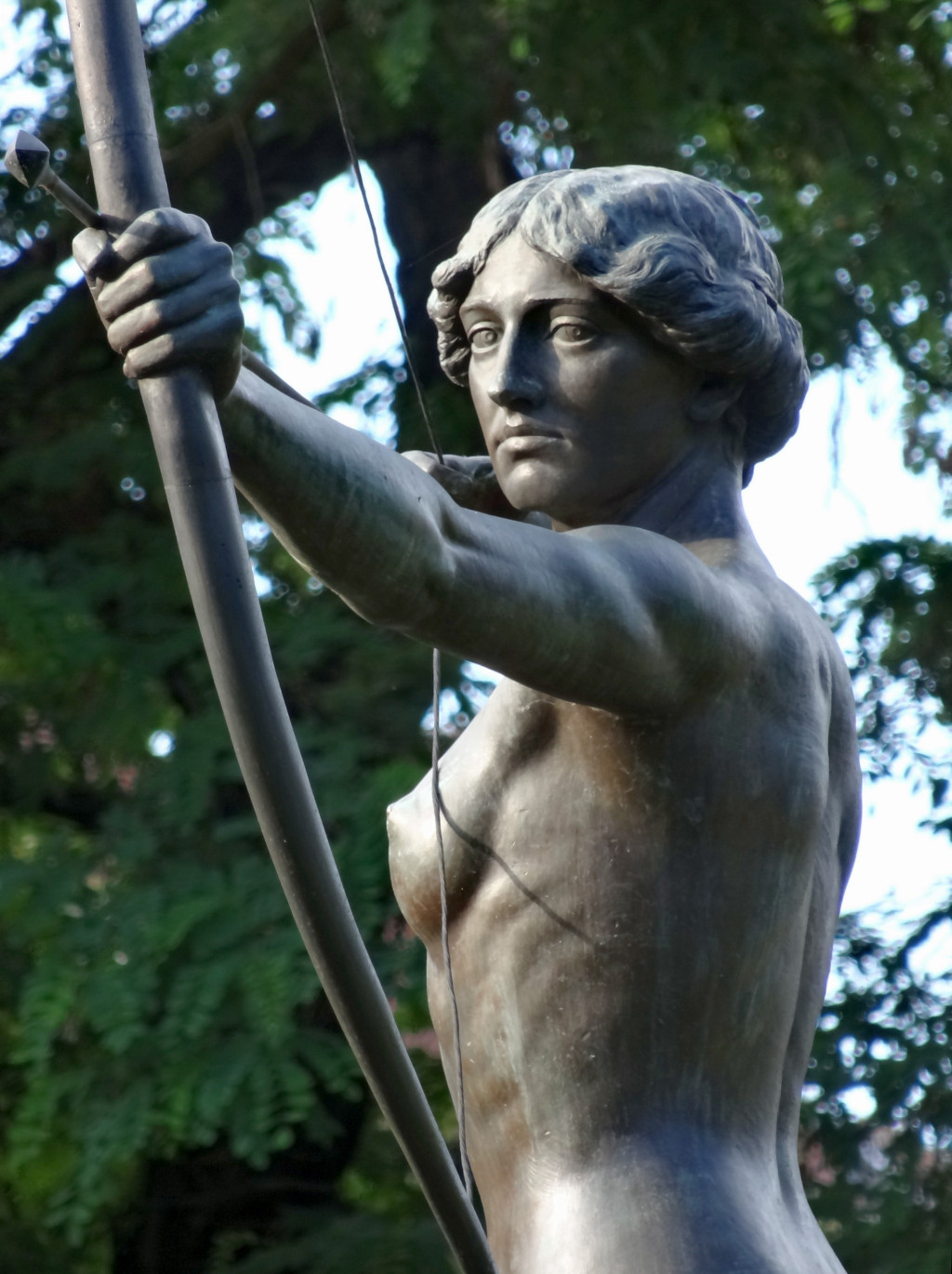
Detail of the bust

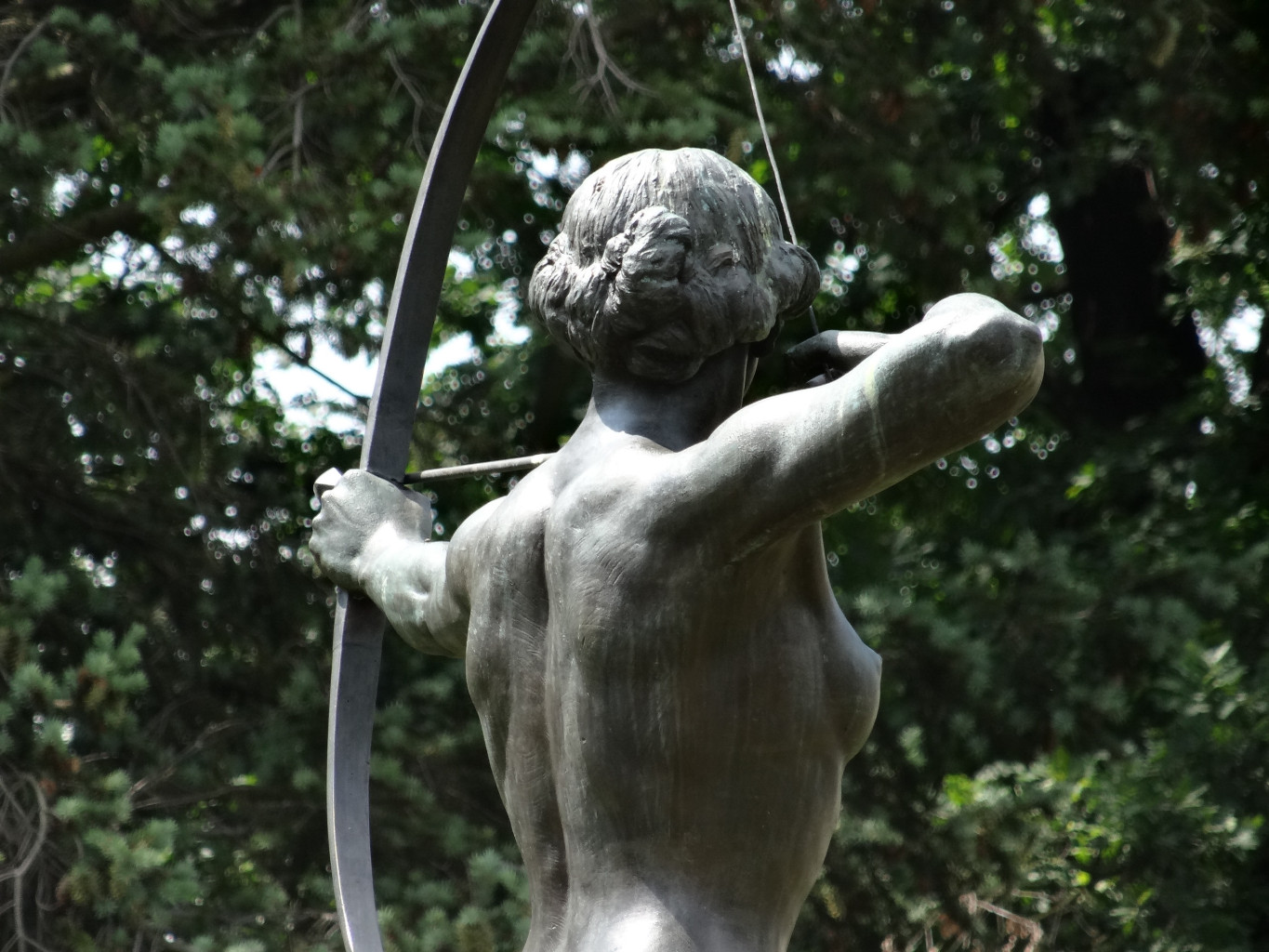
Detail of the back

== Bibliography ==
- Winter Piotr, Derenda Jerzy (1996). Bydgoska Łuczniczka i jej kopie (in Polish). Bydgoszcz: Towarzystwo Miłośników Miasta Bydgoszczy. ISBN 83-903231-4-1.
- (in Polish) Stanisław Błażejewski, Janusz Kutta, Marek Romaniuk (2000). Bydgoski Słownik Biograficzny. Tom VI. Bydgoszcz: Kujawsko-Pomorskie Towarzystwo Kulturalne Wojewódzki Ośrodek Kultury. pp. 61–62. ISBN 8385327584.
