= HSwMS Västergötland =

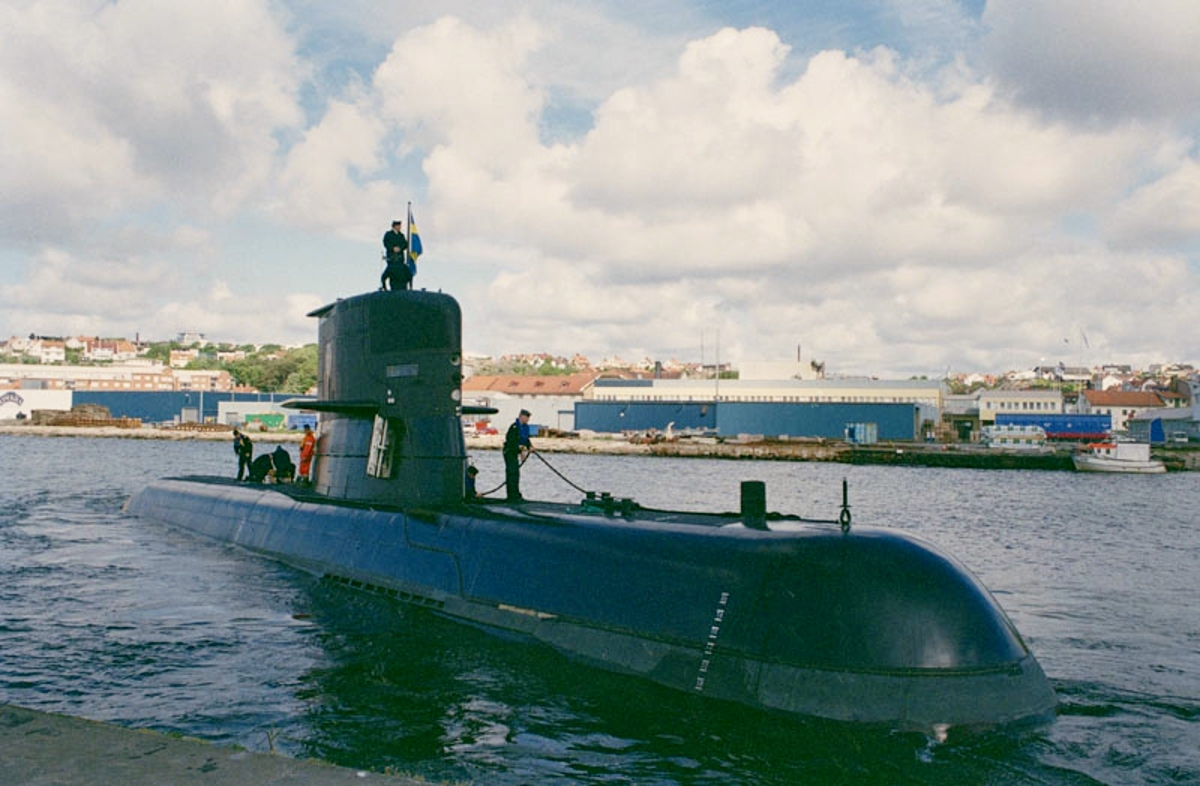
- HSwMS Västergötland on 7 February 2005.

History

Sweden
- Name: Västergötland
- Namesake: Västergötland
- Ordered: 10 January 1983
- Builder: Kockums
- Launched: 19 July 1986
- Commissioned: 27 November 1987
- Decommissioned: 1997
- Motto: Unum, sed leonem; (One, but one lion)
- Nickname(s): Vgd
- Fate: Sold to Singapore in 2005

Singapore
- Name: Swordsman
- Namesake: Swordsman
- Acquired: 4 November 2005
- Commissioned: 30 April 2013
- Home port: Changi
- Motto: Strike with Valour. Triumph in Unity.
- Status: Active

General characteristics
- Class & type: Västergötland-class submarine; Archer-class submarine
- Displacement: 1,400 t (1,378 long tons) surfaced; 1,500 t (1,476 long tons) submerged
- Length: 60.5 m (198 ft 6 in)
- Beam: 6.1 m (20 ft 0 in)
- Propulsion: 2 × Hedemora Diesel generators; 2 × Kockums v4-275R Sterling AIP units
- Speed: 8 knots (15 km/h; 9.2 mph) (Surfaced) 15 knots (28 km/h; 17 mph) (Submerged)
- Complement: 28 officers and enlisted
- Armament: 6 × 533 mm (21 in) torpedo tubes; 3 × 400 mm (16 in) torpedo tubes

HSwMS Västergötland (Vgd) was the lead ship of the Västergötland-class submarines, named after Västergötland, Sweden. The submarine was launched on 19 July 1986 and entered service with the Swedish Navy on 20 October 1988. Västergötland served with the Swedish Navy until 1997 when the submarine was decommissioned. In 2005 Västergötland and sister boat HSwMS Hälsingland were sold to Singapore, where Västergötland was renamed RSS Swordsman and entered service on 30 April 2013.

== Development ==
The submarine design combined the best properties from the preceding Sjöormen and Näcken classes. Submarines of the Västergötland class had greater submarine hunting capacity than previous classes, partly due to the fact that they were equipped with a new modern submarine torpedo. The submarines in the Västergötland class were able to fire up to six heavy and six light wire-guided torpedoes at the same time against different targets, a world record of perhaps dubious benefit that probably still stands today.

The Västergötland class included the submarines HSwMS Södermanland and HSwMS Östergötland. After significant upgrades, these two submarines were reclassified to a new Södermanland class.

== Service in Sweden ==
The submarine served in the Swedish Navy for almost 25 years and was then sold to Singapore in 2005 together with HSwMS Hälsingland.

== Service in Singapore ==
HSwMS Västergötland was renamed RSS Swordsman. Singapore's Ministry of Defence (MINDEF) signed an agreement with Kockums for the supply of two Archer-class (formerly Västergötland-class) submarines to the Republic of Singapore Navy (RSN) on 4 November 2005. More than 20 years old and previously in reserve with the Swedish Navy, the submarines were transferred to the RSN on completion of the modernisation and conversion for operation in tropical waters. RSS Archer was launched on 16 June 2009. RSS Archer underwent sea trials following its launch and is now operational. The second submarine, RSS Swordsman, was launched on 20 October 2010. The Archer-class submarines entered service in 2013 and replaced the Challenger-class submarines that were retired in 2015.

In October 2018, RSS Swordsman participated in Exercise Bersama Lima as part of the Five-Power-Defence-Arrangement exercise and was noted to have performed well, remaining undetected by the participating ships in the anti-submarine warfare exercise.

In November 2018, the Republic of Singapore Navy announced on its official Facebook page that RSS Swordsman successfully conducted a live torpedo firing in the Andaman Sea.

== Gallery ==
HSwMS Västergötland & RSS Swordsman gallery

HSwMS Västergötland's badge.

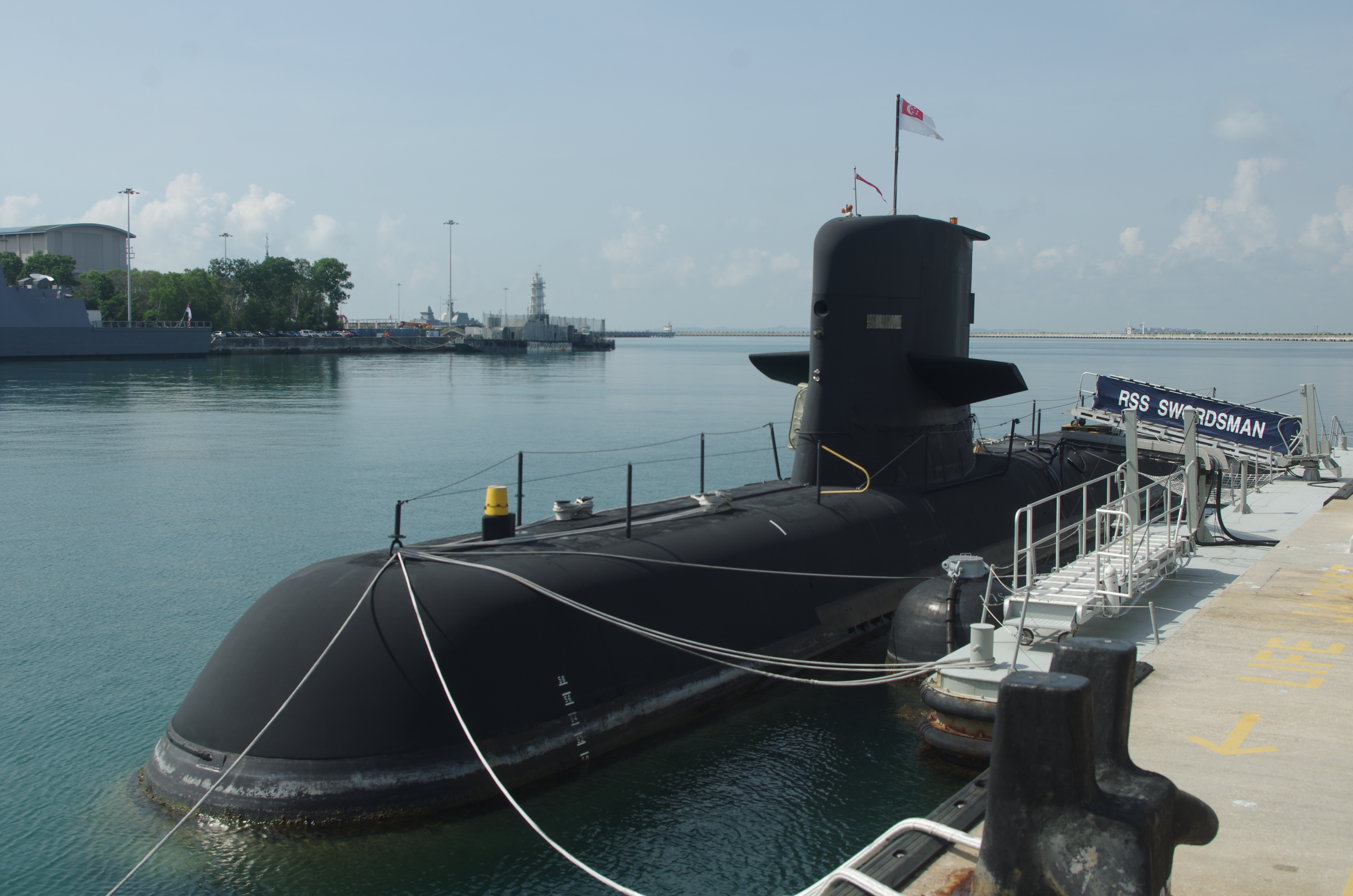
RSS Swordsman alongside Changi Naval Base in 2019.
