= HSwMS Najad =

Several ships of the Swedish Navy have been named HSwMS Najad, named after the mythological water spirit:

- HSwMS Najad (1942) was a Neptun-class submarine launched in 1942 and decommissioned in 1966
- HSwMS Najad (1979) was a Näcken-class submarine launched in 1979

== See also ==
- HSwMS Najaden
- HMS Naiad
