= HSwMS Hälsingland (Hgd) =

History

Sweden
- Name: Hälsingland
- Namesake: Hälsingland
- Ordered: 1 January 1984
- Builder: Kockums
- Launched: 31 August 1987
- Commissioned: 20 October 1988
- Decommissioned: 1997
- Motto: Maximus Caprorum; (Largest among bucks)
- Nickname(s): Hgd
- Fate: Sold to Singapore in 2005

Singapore
- Name: Archer
- Namesake: Archer
- Acquired: 4 November 2005
- Commissioned: 2 December 2011
- Home port: Changi
- Motto: Strike silent. Strike as one.
- Status: Active

General characteristics
- Class & type: Västergötland-class submarine; Archer-class submarine
- Displacement: 1,400 t (1,378 long tons) surfaced; 1,500 t (1,476 long tons) submerged
- Length: 60.5 m (198 ft 6 in)
- Beam: 6.1 m (20 ft 0 in)
- Propulsion: 2 × Hedemora Diesel generators; 2 × Kockums v4-275R Sterling AIP units
- Speed: 8 knots (15 km/h; 9.2 mph) (Surfaced) 15 knots (28 km/h; 17 mph) (Submerged)
- Complement: 28 officers and enlisted
- Armament: 6 × 533 mm (21 in) torpedo tubes; 3 × 400 mm (16 in) torpedo tubes

HSwMS Hälsingland (Hgd), was the second submarine of the Västergötland class. The vessel was named after Hälsingland, Sweden. The submarine was launched on 31 August 1987 and entered service with the Swedish Navy on 20 October 1988. Hälsingland served with the Swedish Navy until 1997 when the submarine was decommissioned. In 2005 Hälsingland and sister boat HSwMS Västergötland were sold to Singapore, where Hälsingland was renamed RSS Archer and entered service on 2 December 2011. Archer remains in service.

== Development ==
The submarine design combined the best properties from the preceding Swedish Sjöormen and Näcken classes. Submarines of the Västergötland class had greater submarine hunting capacity than previous classes, partly due to the fact that they were equipped with a new modern submarine torpedo. The submarines in the Västergötland class were able to fire up to six heavy and six light wire-guided torpedoes at the same time against different targets, a world record of perhaps dubious benefit that probably still stands today.

The Västergötland class included the submarines HSwMS Södermanland and HSwMS Östergötland. After significant upgrades, these two submarines were reclassified to a new Södermanland class.

== Service in Sweden ==
The submarine served in the Swedish Navy for almost 25 years and was then sold to Singapore in 2005 together with HSwMS Västergötland.

== Service in Singapore ==
HSwMS Hälsingland was renamed RSS Archer. Singapore's Ministry of Defence (MINDEF) signed an agreement with Kockums for the supply of two Archer-class (formerly Västergötland-class) submarines to the Republic of Singapore Navy (RSN) on 4 November 2005. More than 20 years old and previously in reserve with the Swedish Navy, the submarines were transferred to the RSN on completion of the modernisation and conversion for operation in tropical waters. RSS Archer was launched on 16 June 2009. RSS Archer has undergone sea trials following its launch and is now operational. The second submarine, RSS Swordsman, was launched on 20 October 2010. The Archer-class submarines entered service in 2013 and replaced the Challenger-class submarines that were retired in 2015. RSS Archer's crew motto and philosophy is 'Strike Silent, Strike as One'.

RSS Archer's inaugural exercise was in 2013 as part of Exercise CARAT with the United States Navy. It has since taken part in numerous exercises such as Ex Singsiam and Ex SIMBEX which is held with the Royal Thai Navy and Indian Navy respectively.

In 2014, RSS Archer was awarded the Republic of Singapore Navy's Best Ship Award, after participating in fleet-level exercises with various foreign partners including the United States Navy.

In 2015, RSS Archer participated in the first-ever anti-submarine warfare exercise in Exercise Singsiam's history in the Andaman Sea alongside counterparts from the Royal Thai Navy. During the exercise, RSS Archer trained with naval helicopters jointly deployed from HTMS Naresuan, HTMS Saiburi, RSS Intrepid as well as a Dornier 228 Marine Patrol Aircraft(MPA).

In July 2015, RSS Archer participated in the 21st Exercise CARAT after 11 days of intensive shore and at sea exercises. This exercise is noted to have involved a Los Angeles Class submarine, USS Houston, the Arleigh Burke class USS Lassen and a P-8A Poseidon maritime patrol aircraft as well as the Republic of Singapore Navy warships RSS Supreme for the Anti-Submarine Warfare training engagement.

== Gallery ==
HSwMS Hälsingland & RSS Archer gallery

HSwMS Hälsingland's badge
