= Archer (ship) =

Archer is the name of various ships:

- RSS Archer, a submarine of the Republic of Singapore, first ship in the Archer-class submarine
- HMS Archer, various ships of the British Royal Navy named "Archer"
- HMAS Archer (P 86), an Attack-class patrol boat of the Royal Australian Navy
- CSS Archer, a Confederate States of America commerce raider
- Texan brig Archer, a Republic of Texas brig
- USS Archer (BAVG-1), a United States Navy escort carrier

== See also ==
- Daisy Archer, a Maryland Fisheries Force and Navy patrol boat
- SS Empire Archer, a British Empire-class cargo ship
- Archer class (disambiguation), various ship classes
- Archer (disambiguation)
