= Archer class =

Archer class may refer to:

- Archer-class patrol vessel, a class of patrol and training vessel of the Royal Navy
- Archer-class submarine, a class of submarines of the Republic of Singapore Navy
- Archer-class sloop, a 19th-century class of Royal Navy screw sloop
- Archer-class (1801 batch) gun brigs, 18th-century Royal Navy gun brigs
- Archer-class (1804 batch) gun brigs, 18th-century Royal Navy gun brigs
- Archer (character class), a fantasy archetype

== See also ==
- Archer (disambiguation)
- Archer (ship)
