= HSwMS Näcken =

Several ships of the Swedish Navy have been named HSwMS Näcken, named after the mythological water spirit:

- HSwMS Näcken (1942), a Neptun-class submarine launched in 1942 and decommissioned in 1966
- HSwMS Näcken (1978), a Näcken-class submarine launched in 1978 and decommissioned in 2005
