= HSwMS Hälsingland =

Two warships of Sweden have been named Hälsingland, after Hälsingland:

- HSwMS Hälsingland (J23), a Östergötland-class destroyer launched in 1959 and stricken in 1982.
- HSwMS Hälsingland (Hgd), a Västergötland-class submarine launched in 1987 and since in active service.
