= List of shipwrecks in March 1853 =

The list of shipwrecks in March 1853 includes ships sunk, foundered, wrecked, grounded, or otherwise lost during March 1853.

== 1 March ==
List of shipwrecks: 1 March 1853
Ship	State	Description
Carib	United Kingdom	The ship ran aground near Woosung, China. She was on a voyage from Liverpool, Lancashire to Woosung.
Eliza	United Kingdom	The ship was severely damaged by fire at Boulogne, Pas-de-Calais, France.
Ellen	United Kingdom	The ship was wrecked on the Horse Bank, in Liverpool Bay with the loss of all hands.
Perseverance	United Kingdom	The ship ran aground on the Barber Sand, in the North Sea off the coast of Norfolk. She was on a voyage from Poole, Dorset to Hartlepool, County Durham. She was refloated and resumed her voyage.
St. George	United Kingdom	The ship was driven ashore at the Melbourne Heads, Victoria. She was refloated and taken in to Hobson Bay.

== 2 March ==
List of shipwrecks: 2 March 1853
Ship	State	Description
Christine Marie	Hamburg	The ship was driven ashore on Scharhörn. She was on a voyage from Middlesbrough, Yorkshire, United Kingdom to Hamburg. She was refloated on 4 March and taken in to Cuxhaven.
Garrell	United Kingdom	The ship ran aground on the Barnard Sand, in the North Sea off the coast of Suffolk. She was on a voyage from Shoreham-by-Sea, Sussex to Hartlepool, County Durham. She was refloated and taken in to Kessingland, Suffolk.
Mary Ann	United Kingdom	The ship ran aground on the Pollock Slip, off the coast of Massachusetts, United States. She was on a voyage from Liverpool, Lancashire to Boston, Massachusetts. She was refloated and resumed her voyage in a leaky condition, arriving on 4 March.

== 3 March ==
List of shipwrecks: 3 March 1853
Ship	State	Description
Albatross	United Kingdom	The steamship ran aground in the River Lee. She was on a voyage from Liverpool, Lancashire to Cork.
Ann and Jane	United Kingdom	The ship struck the Western Rocks, in the Isles of Scilly and was severely damaged. She was on a voyage from Caernarfon to Perth. She was taken in to port in the Isles of Scilly.
City of Manchester	United Kingdom	The steamship ran aground on the Hamburgh Flats, off the coast of Delaware, United States. She was later refloated.
Ann Mills	United Kingdom	The brig was driven on to Newcombe Sand, in the North Sea off the coast of Suffolk. Her crew were rescued by a yawl. She subsequently came ashore at Kessingland, Suffolk. She was refloated on 7 March and taken in to Lowestoft, Suffolk.
Free	United Kingdom	The ship was driven ashore at Livorno, Grand Duchy of Tuscany. She was on a voyage from Liverpool to Livorno. She was refloated.
Kingston	United Kingdom	The ship departed from Marseille, Bouches-du-Rhône, France for a British port. No further trace, presumed foundered with the loss of all hands.
Ranger	United Kingdom	The ship ran aground at South Shields, County Durham. She was on a voyage from South Shields to London. She was refloated and put back to South Shields.
Ranger	United Kingdom	The ship departed from Marseille, Bouches-du-Rhône, France for an English port. No further trace, presumed foundered with the loss of all hands.

== 4 March ==
List of shipwrecks: 4 March 1853
Ship	State	Description
Aurora	United Kingdom	The ship was driven ashore at Spurn Point, Yorkshire. Her crew were rescued by Carter's rocket apparatus. Aurora was on a voyage from London to Sunderland, County Durham. She was refloated on 9 March and taken in to Grimsby, Lincolnshire.
Carena	United Kingdom	The ship ran aground between the Jardines and the Isle of Pines, Cuba. She was on a voyage from Cienfuegos, Cuba to Swansea, Glamorgan. She was refloated and put in to Havana, Cuba in a leaky condition.
Evangeline	United Kingdom	The ship was in collision with another vessel. She put in to Folkestone, Kent where she ran aground. She was on a voyage from Sunderland, County Durham to Hong Kong. She was refloated and taken in to The Downs. Evangeline subsequently put in to Ramsgate, Kent for repairs.
Gerhardina Bertha	Bremen	The ship was driven ashore by ice on Langlütjen. She was on a voyage from Sunderland to Vegesack.
Grafstroom	Netherlands	The ship ran aground on the Krammer, off the coast of Zeeland.
James and Ann	United Kingdom	The brig was driven ashore at Spurn Point. Her crew were rescued by Carter's rocket apparatus. She was on a voyage from London to South Shields, County Durham. James and Ann was refloated on 8 March and towed in to Grimsby, Lincolnshire in a leaky condition.
James Saville	United Kingdom	The brigantine was run down and sunk in the North Sea off the coast of Yorkshire by the brig Eliza and Jane. Her crew were rescued by Glance (United Kingdom).
Margaret	United Kingdom	The three-masted schooner was in collision with Marmora (United Kingdom) and was abandoned by her crew, who were rescued by Marmora. She was subsequently driven ashore 8 nautical miles (15 km) south of Bridlington, Yorkshire in a severely damaged condition. She was refloated on 9 March and taken in to Bridlington.
Morgiana	United Kingdom	The ship was driven ashore at Spurn Point. Her crew were rescued by Carter's rocket apparatus. She was on a voyage from London to Hartlepool, County Durham.
Nathaniel, and William	United Kingdom	The ships were in collision off Bridlington and were both driven ashore tangled together. Nathaniel was on a voyage from London to South Shields. She was refloated on 5 March and taken in to Bridlington. William was refloated on 8 March and taken in to Bridlington.
Placidia	United Kingdom	The brig was driven ashore at Spurn Point. Her crew were rescued by Carter's rocket apparatus. She was on a voyage from London to South Shields. Placidia was refloated on 7 March and resumed her voyage.
Rapid	United Kingdom	The ship was on Tongatapu. All on board were rescued. She was on a voyage from San Francisco, California, United States to Sydney, New South Wales.
Robert Kerr	United Kingdom	The barque was abandoned in the Atlantic Ocean (40°36′N 53°05′W). All 45 people on board were rescued by the barque Douglass (United Kingdom). Robert Kerr was on a voyage from Glasgow, Renfrewshire to New York, United States.

== 5 March ==
List of shipwrecks: 5 March 1853
Ship	State	Description
Alpha	Kingdom of Hanover	The galiot ran aground on the Goodwin Sands, Kent, United Kingdom. She was refloated but consequently sank in The Downs. Her crew were rescued.
Amy	United Kingdom	The ship ran aground on the Cerca Bank. She was on a voyage from Maranhão, Brazil to Liverpool, Lancashire. She was refloated and taken in to Maranhão in a severely leaky condition.
Arabia	United States	The ship was driven ashore on Tybee Island, Georgia. She was on a voyage from Liverpool to Savannah, Georgia. She was refloated.
Canada	United Kingdom	The ship ran aground on the Stonehouse Shoal, in the Atlantic Ocean 10 nautical miles (19 km) south of Tybee Island. She was on a voyage from Queenstown, County Cork to Havana, Cuba.
Friends	United Kingdom	The ship was in collision with Lady Williamson (United Kingdom) and then ran aground on the Stoney Binks, in the North Sea off the mouth of the Humber. She was on a voyage from London to South Shields, County Durham. She was refloated and put in to Bridlington, Yorkshire.

== 6 March ==
List of shipwrecks: 6 March 1853
Ship	State	Description
Anna Maria	United Kingdom	The troopship was driven ashore in the United States of the Ionian Islands. She was on a voyage from Queenstown, County Cork to Corfu, United States of the Ionian Islands. She was refloated on 9 March and taken in to Corfu.
Glory	United Kingdom	The schooner sank in the Irish Sea off the South Stack Lighthouse, Anglesey. Her crew survived. She was on a voyage from Arklow, County Wicklow to Liverpool, Lancashire.
Hercules	United Kingdom	The barque was abandoned in the Atlantic Ocean (35°00′N 72°30′W. Her eighteen crew were rescued by Montauk and Perote (both United States) before she foundered.
Spee	United Kingdom	The ship was driven ashore at Bridlington, Yorkshire. She was refloated and resumed her voyage.
Water Lily	United Kingdom	The ship was driven ashore at Bridlington. She was refloated and resumed her voyage.

== 7 March ==
List of shipwrecks: 7 March 1853
Ship	State	Description
Belmont	United Kingdom	The ship caught fire and was scuttled at New Orleans, Louisiana, United States.
Clutha	United Kingdom	The ship was wrecked at Western Bay, Newfoundland, British North America. She was on a voyage from Cádiz, Spain to Saint John's, Newfoundland.
Hercules	United Kingdom	The ship foundered in the Atlantic Ocean. Her crew were rescued. She was on a voyage from Liverpool, Lancashire to Charleston, South Carolina, United States.
Maine	United States	The ship was damaged by fire at New Orleans.
Mississippi	United States	The ship was driven ashore on Sharp Island. She was on a voyage from Rotterdam, South Holland, Netherlands to Baltimore, Maryland. She was refloated and towed in to Baltimore.

== 8 March ==
List of shipwrecks: 8 March 1853
Ship	State	Description
Alecto	(United Kingdom of Great Britain and Ireland) Victoria	The ship was driven ashore a Point Richards.
Mary and Caroline	United Kingdom	The ship ran aground near "Nagara", Ottoman Empire. She was on a voyage from Constantinople, Ottoman Empire to a British port. She was refloated with assistance from the tug Brothers (United Kingdom).

== 9 March ==
List of shipwrecks: 9 March 1853
Ship	State	Description
Indifferente	United Kingdom	The ship departed from Malta for an English port. No further trace, presumed foundered with the loss of all hands.
Rocket	United Kingdom	The ship was driven ashore at Eccles-on-Sea, Norfolk.

== 10 March ==
List of shipwrecks: 10 March 1853
Ship	State	Description
Atalanta	United States	The ship was driven ashore at Sandy Hook, New Jersey.
Queen Victoria	United Kingdom	The brig was run down and sunk in the North Sea off Cromer, Norfolk by the paddle steamer Water Witch (United Kingdom). Her crew were rescued by Water Witch. Queen Victoria was on a voyage from Hartlepool, County Durham to Rochester, Kent.

== 11 March ==
List of shipwrecks: 11 March 1853
Ship	State	Description
Aim, or Ann	United Kingdom	The schooner was wrecked at Deal, Kent. Her crew were rescued by Marchioness of Londonderry (United Kingdom).
Castilian Maid	United Kingdom	The schooner was driven ashore in Castletown Bay. She was on a voyage from Port Dinorwic, Caernarfonshire to Newcastle upon Tyne, Northumberland. She was refloated and taken in to Castletown, Isle of Man in a sinking condition.
George Bolton	United Kingdom	The steamship suffered a boiler explosion and sank in the North Sea off the mouth of the Humber with the loss of two of her ten crew.
Leonidas	United Kingdom	The full-rigged ship was driven ashore at Redcar, Yorkshire. She was on her maiden voyage, from Sunderland, County Durham to London. She was refloated on 13 March and taken in to West Hartlepool, County Durham in a severely damaged condition.
Telscida	Austrian Empire	The ship was driven ashore in Whiting Bay, County Cork, United Kingdom. Her crew were rescued. She broke up on 11 March.
Thomas Henry	(United Kingdom of Great Britain and Ireland) British North America	The ship was driven ashore and wrecked at Crookhaven, County Cork. She was on a voyage from New Orleans, Louisiana, United States to Liverpool, Lancashire.
Willing Lass	United Kingdom	The schooner ran aground on the Skull Rock. All on board were rescued. She was on a voyage from the Clyde to Melbourne, Victoria. Willing Lass was refloated on 20 March and towed in to Belfast, County Antrim.

== 12 March ==
List of shipwrecks: 12 March 1853
Ship	State	Description
Charles	United Kingdom	The ship was driven ashore near Saint John, New Brunswick, British North America. She was on a voyage from Saint John to Australia. She was refloated and put in to Yarmouth, Nova Scotia, British North America.
Cromwell	United Kingdom	The ship struck a sunken wreck and foundered off the north coast of Norfolk. Her crew were rescued. She was on a voyage from South Shields, County Durham to London.
Fanny	United Kingdom	The sloop ran aground on the Theddlethorpe Knowl, in the North Sea off the coast of Lincolnshire. She was on a voyage from London to Leeds, Yorkshire. She was refloated but found to be severely leaky. Fanny was assisted in to Grimsby, Lincolnshire by the sloop Benjamin and Sarah (United Kingdom) and was beached.
George Canning	United States	The ship was driven ashore on Düne, Heligoland. She was on a voyage from New York to Hamburg.
Linea	Sweden	The ship ran aground on the Norder Rinne, off Læsø, Denmark ad was wrecked. Her crew were rescued. She was on a voyage from Halmstad to Stavanger, Norway.
United States	United States	The ship arrived at New York in a leaky condition and sank.

== 13 March ==
List of shipwrecks: March 1853
Ship	State	Description
Edmund	Bremen	The ship ran aground at Bremerhaven. She was on a voyage from Liverpool, Lancashire, United Kingdom to Bremerhaven.
Georges	France	The smack was driven ashore as Shoreham-by-Sea, Sussex, United Kingdom. She was on a voyage from Cherbourg, Manche to Shoreham-by-Sea.

== 14 March ==
List of shipwrecks: 14 March 1853
Ship	State	Description
RMS America	United Kingdom	The steamship ran aground on the Burbo Bank, in Liverpool Bay. She was on a voyage from Boston, Massachusetts United States to Liverpool, Lancashire. She was refloated and taken in to Liverpool.
Bercean	France	The ship was lost in the Bay of Lancresse, Channel Islands with the loss of all hands.
Diligence	United Kingdom	The smack ran aground on the Briggs, in the Irish Sea. She was refloated on 25 March and towed in to Belfast, County Antrim.
Due Cugine	(Ottoman Empire) Damascus Eyalet	The bombard sprang a leak and foundered in the Mediterranean Sea. her crew were rescued. She was on a voyage from Malta to Mesatura Ottoman Tripolitania.
Flora	United Kingdom	The ship was in collision with a brig off Skagen, Denmark and was then wrecked on the Skaw Reef. Her crew were rescued. She was on a voyage from Hartlepool, County Durham to Randers, Norway.
Harmony	United Kingdom	The ship was driven ashore near Greencastle, County Donegal. She was on a voyage from Lough Swilly to Glasgow, Renfrewshire. She was refloated on 16 March and taken in to Londonderry.
Mor	United Kingdom	The clipper ran aground and was wrecked in the Yangtze kiang. She was on a voyage from Bombay, India to Shanghai, China.
Pomona	United Kingdom	The ship was driven ashore at Lerwick, Shetland Islands. She was refloated and resumed her voyage.

== 15 March ==
List of shipwrecks: 15 March 1853
Ship	State	Description
Mary Mac	United Kingdom	The ship was driven ashore on Rathlin Island, County Donegal. She was on a voyage from Ardrossan, Ayrshire to Boston, Massachusetts, United States. She was refloated on 4 July.
Schwan	Flag unknown	The ship ran aground at Killala, County Mayo, United Kingdom. She was on a voyage from Brăila, Ottoman Empire to Ballina, County Mayo. She was towed up the River Moy on 24 March but ran aground and was wrecked.

== 16 March ==
List of shipwrecks: 16 March 1853
Ship	State	Description
John Bull	United Kingdom	The steamship ran aground at Teufelsbrück. She was on a voyage from Hamburg to London. She was refloated with the assistance of another steamship and resumed her voyage.
Lady Rowena	United Kingdom	The barque was destroyed by fire near Sagres, Portugal. Her crew were rescued by the brigs Grand and Zenith (both France). Lady Rowena was on a voyage from Alexandria, Egypt to Liverpool, Lancashire.
Luisa y Yesusa	Spain	The ship was wrecked on the Ginger Key. Her crew were rescued. She was on a voyage from Liverpool, Lancashire, United Kingdom to Havana, Cuba.
Spring	United Kingdom	The ship ran aground on the Mussel Scarp, in the North Sea off the coast of County Durham. She was refloated and taken in to South Shields, County Durham in a leaky condition.

== 17 March ==
List of shipwrecks: 17 March 1853
Ship	State	Description
Admiral	United Kingdom	The paddle steamer ran aground in Lough Foyle. She was on a voyage from Londonderry to Liverpool, Lancashire. She was refloated on 22 March and completed her voyage.
Admiral Nelson	(United Kingdom of Great Britain and Ireland) Jersey	The schooner ran aground at Sunderland, County Durham. She was on a voyage from Jersey to Sunderland. She was refloated and towed in to Sunderland.
Amazone	Russia	The ship was run aground and was damaged at South Shields, County Durham, United Kingdom. She was on a voyage from Berdyansk to South Shields.
Blackheath	United Kingdom	The ship ran aground and was damaged at Port Phillip, Victoria. She was on a voyage from London to Port Phillip.
Lydia	United Kingdom	The ship was driven ashore south of Blyth, Northumberland. Her crew were rescued by Manby Mortar. She was on a voyage from Aberdeen to Sunderland.
Neptune	United Kingdom	The ship ran aground in the River Tyne at Stanhope, County Durham. She was on a voyage from the River Tyne to Havre de Grâce, Seine-Inférieure, France and British North America. She was refloated and taken in to South Shields, County Durham.
Osbourne	United States	The ship was wrecked on Grand Bahama, Bahamas. All on board were rescued. She was on a voyage from Liverpool to New Orleans, Louisiana.
Peacock	United Kingdom	The ship was driven ashore in the Dardanelles. She was on a voyage from Liverpool to Constantinople, Ottoman Empire.

== 18 March ==
List of shipwrecks: 18 March 1853
Ship	State	Description
Espirito Santo	Portugal	The ship was abandoned in the Atlantic Ocean with the loss of two lives. She was on a voyage from Pará, Brazil to Porto.
King William	United Kingdom	The ship struck a sunken rock off Porto, Portugal and was damaged. She was on a voyage from Porto to Leith, Lothian.
Spray	United Kingdom	The ship was driven ashore by ice at Cuxhaven. She was on a voyage from Pernambuco, Brazil to Bremen She was refloated and found to be severely leaky.
Willing Lass	United Kingdom	The schooner was driven ashore at Ballywalter, County Down. She was refloated on 21 March and towed in to Belfast, County Antrim.

== 19 March ==
List of shipwrecks: 19 March 1853
Ship	State	Description
Abeona	United Kingdom	The barque was destroyed by fire in the Mississippi River. She was on a voyage from New Orleans, Louisiana, United States to Liverpool, Lancashire.
Salacia	United Kingdom	The ship was driven ashore at Hartlepool, County Durham. She was on a voyage from Seaham, County Durham to London. She was refloated and taken in to Hartlepool.
Wiking Lass	United Kingdom	The ship ran aground on the Skull Rock. She was on a voyage from the Clyde to Melbourne, Australia.

== 18 March ==
List of shipwrecks: 18 March 1853
Ship	State	Description
King William	United Kingdom	The ship ran aground and was damaged at Porto, Portugal. She was on a voyage from Porto to Leith, Lothian. She was later refloated an put back to Porto.

== 19 March ==
List of shipwrecks: 19 March 1853
Ship	State	Description
Honor	Malta	The schooner was driven ashore and wrecked at Zakynthos, Greece. She was on a voyage from Patras to Zakynthos

== 20 March ==
List of shipwrecks: 20 March 1853
Ship	State	Description
Lavinia	United Kingdom	The ship was driven ashore at "Gioja", Sicily. She was on a voyage from Genoa, Kingdom of Sardinia to Constantinople, Ottoman Empire. She was refloated in mid-May but drove ashore again and was wrecked.

== 21 March ==
List of shipwrecks: 21 March 1853
Ship	State	Description
Cluny	United Kingdom	The ship was driven ashore near Liverpool, Lancashire. She was on a voyage from Liverpool to New Orleans, Louisiana, United. She was refloated and taken it to Liverpool.
Cornelia	Netherlands	The ship was driven ashore at Zandvoort, North Holland. She was on a voyage from Trieste to Amsterdam, North Holland. She was refloated on 25 March and towed in to Texel, North Holland.
Glanusk	United Kingdom	The ship was driven ashore on the west coast of Sardinia with the loss of two of her crew.
Hopewell	United Kingdom	The ship was driven ashore at Swanage, Dorset. She was refloated and put in to Poole, Dorset in a leaky condition.

== 22 March ==
List of shipwrecks: 22 March 1853
Ship	State	Description
Baronet	United Kingdom	The barque was driven ashore by ice at Cuxhaven. She had been refloated by 27 March.
Blessing	United Kingdom	The brig was driven ashore by ice at Cuxhaven. She had been refloated by 27 March.
Colombo	United Kingdom	The ship ran aground on the Goodwin Sands, Kent. She was on a voyage from Sicily to Newcastle upon Tyne, Northumberland. She was refloated and taken in to Ramsgate, Kent in a leaky condition.
Effart	United Kingdom	The ship was driven ashore by ice at Cuxhaven. She had been refloated by 27 March.
Elbe	United Kingdom	The steamship was driven ashore by ice at Cuxhaven.
Galatea	Hamburg	The ship was driven ashore by ice at Cuxhaven. She had been refloated by 27 March.
Gem	United Kingdom	The barque was driven ashore by ice at Cuxhaven. She had been refloated by 27 March.
Hever	Hamburg	The ship was driven ashore by ice at Cuxhaven. She was on a voyage from Genoa, Kingdom of Sardinia to Hamburg. She had been refloated by 27 March.
Jay	United Kingdom	The brig was driven ashore by ice at Cuxhaven. She had been refloated by 27 March.
Jeune Victorieux	Grand Duchy of Mecklenburg-Schwerin	The galeas was driven ashore by ice at Cuxhaven.
John Spencer	United Kingdom	The full-rigged ship was driven ashore by ice at Cuxhaven. She had been refloated by 27 March.
Juniper	United Kingdom	The ship was damaged by ice at Glückstadt, Duchy of Holstein. She was on a voyage from Grimsby, Lincolnshire to Hamburg.
Mathilde	Hamburg	The ship was driven ashore by ice at Cuxhaven. She was on a voyage from Puerto Cabello, Venezuela to Hamburg. She had been refloated by 27 March.
Ocean	Sweden	The barque was driven ashore by ice at Cuxhaven. She had been refloated by 27 March.
Oder	Hamburg	The barque was driven ashore by ice at Cuxhaven. She had been refloated by 27 March.
Patria	United Kingdom	The ship was driven ashore by ice at Cuxhaven.
Roscoe	United Kingdom	The ship ran aground on the Corton Sand, in the North Sea off the coast of Suffolk. She was on a voyage from London to Sunderland, County Durham. She was refloated and taken in to Great Yarmouth, Norfolk.
Trident	United Kingdom	The steamship was damaged by ice at Glückstadt. She was on a voyage from Hamburg to London.
Wanderer	United Kingdom	The brig was wrecked on the East Hoyle Bank, in Liverpool Bay. She was on a voyage from Liverpool, Lancashire to Cardiff, Glamorgan.
Washington	United States	The barque was driven ashore by ice at Cuxhaven.

== 23 March ==
List of shipwrecks: 23 March 1853
Ship	State	Description
Baronet	United Kingdom	The ship was driven ashore by ice at Cuxhaven.
Blessing	United Kingdom	The ship was driven ashore by ice at Cuxhaven.
Elbe	United Kingdom	The ship was driven ashore by ice at Cuxhaven.
Gem	United Kingdom	The barque was driven ashore by ice at Cuxhaven.
Jay	United Kingdom	The ship was driven ashore by ice at Cuxhaven.
John Spencer	United Kingdom	The ship was driven ashore by ice at Cuxhaven.
Robert and Betsey	United Kingdom	The ship sprang a leak and was beached 2 nautical miles (3.7 km) north of Bridlington, East Riding of Yorkshire. She was on a voyage from Hartlepool, County Durham to King's Lynn, Norfolk. She was refloated the next day and taken in to Bridlington.

== 24 March ==
List of shipwrecks: 24 March 1853
Ship	State	Description
Colombo	Flag unknown	The brig ran aground on the Goodwin Sands, Kent, United Kingdom.
Condraty Savin	Russia	The ship was driven ashore and wrecked at Galata, Ottoman Empire. She was on a voyage from Odesa to Antwerp, Belgium.
Eliza	United Kingdom	The ship was driven ashore at Penzance, Cornwall. She was on a voyage from Swansea, Glamorgan to Plymouth, Devon. She was refloated the next day.
Flora	Stettin	The ship was destroyed by fire off "Zeigenort".
Kirwan	United Kingdom	The ship was driven against the quayside and damaged at Penzance.
Sarah Dickson	United Kingdom	The ship was driven ashore at Penzance. She was on a voyage from Arklow, County Wicklow to Plymouth. She was refloated the next day and taken in to Penzance.
Sultana	Hamburg	The schooner was wrecked in the Isles of Scilly, United Kingdom with the loss of all hands. She was on a voyage from Baltimore, Maryland, United States to Hamburg.
Victoria	United Kingdom	The hoveller, a lugger foundered in the Gull Stream, off the coast of Kent with the loss of two of the three people on board.

== 25 March ==
List of shipwrecks: 25 March 1853
Ship	State	Description
Augusta	Russia	The ship was wrecked at Barber's Point, in the Dardanelles. She was on a voyage from Newcastle upon Tyne, Northumberland to Constantinople, Ottoman Empire.
Duncan Ritchie	United Kingdom	The ship was partly abandoned in the Atlantic Ocean. Thirteen crew and some passengers were rescued by Agneta Juliana (Netherlands). Duncan Ritchie was on a voyage from Leith, Lothian to Port Phillip, Victoria. She put in to the Isles of Scilly on 28 March.
George	United Kingdom	The brig struck a sunken rock and sank 3 nautical miles (5.6 km) off the Brizens, off Land's End, Cornwall. Her six crew were rescued by the schooner Brilliant (United Kingdom).
Hawthorn	United Kingdom	The brig sank in the River Wear. She was refloated.
Henry Holland	United Kingdom	The ship was driven ashore at "Corrygill", Ayrshire. She was on a voyage from the Clyde to Saint John, New Brunswick, British North America.

== 26 March ==
List of shipwrecks: 26 March 1853
Ship	State	Description
Antarctic	United States	The whaler was wrecked at Waitangi Beach in New Zealand's Chatham Islands with the loss of one life when she was driven ashore in a heavy gale.
Cleopatra	United Kingdom	The three-masted schooner ran aground on the Newcombe Sand, in the North Sea off the coast of Suffolk. She was on a voyage from Dundee, Forfarshire to London or vice versa. She was refloated and taken in to Lowestoft, Suffolk.
Cornelius	United Kingdom	The brig foundered in the Bay of Biscay. Her crew were rescued by the schooner St. Louis (France).
Coromandel	United Kingdom	The schooner was driven onto the Salthouse Bank, in the Irish Sea off Lytham St. Annes, Lancashire. She was refloated but consequently sank. Her crew were rescued by the Lytham Lifeboat. Coromandel was on a voyage from Troon, Ayrshire to Lytham St. Annes.
Figaro	Bremen	brig ran aground on the Goodwin Sands, Kent, United Kingdom. One hundred passengers were taken off by a lugger. Figaro was on a voyage from Bremen to New York, United States. She was refloated and towed in to Ramsgate, Kent by the tug Ramsgate (United Kingdom).
F. J. Wichelhausen	Bremen	The full-rigged ship was driven ashore in the Hudson River. She was on a voyage from New York to Bremen. She was refloated the next day and resumed her voyage.
London Packet	United Kingdom	The ship was driven ashore 1.5 nautical miles (2.8 km) west of Newhaven, Sussex. She was on a voyage from Rouen, Seine-Inférieure, France to London.

== 27 March ==
List of shipwrecks: 27 March 1853
Ship	State	Description
Aboukir, and Serampore	India	The barque Aboukir was driven into the full-rigged ship Serampore and then driven ashore at Madras with the loss of all but three of her eight crew. Serampore consequently foundered with the loss of eighteen of her 26 crew. She was on a voyage from Calingapatnam to Madras.
Asia	United Kingdom	The ship was damaged by fire at Liverpool, Lancashire.
Bucanier	United Kingdom	The barque was driven ashore and wrecked at Madras.
Buccaneer	United Kingdom	The brig was wrecked at Pondicherry, India. Her crew survived.
Devonshire	United Kingdom	The ship was driven ashore and damaged at Madras.
Jupiter	United Kingdom	The brig sank at Negapatam, India with the loss of both hands on board at the time.
King Henry	United Kingdom	The barque was severely damaged at Calicut, India.
La Cleante	France	The ship was wrecked near Cuddalore, India.
La Florine	France	The full-rigged ship was wrecked near Cuddalore.
La Semillante	France	The ship was wrecked near Pondicherry.
Le Marius	India	The full-rigged ship was wrecked near Cuddalore.
L'Hercule	France	The full-rigged ship was wrecked near Cuddalore.
L'Hortenze	France	The brig was wrecked near Cuddalore.
Lutchimi	India	The barque was driven ashore at Madras. Her seventeen crew were rescued.
Muddut Mowlah	India	The sloop was driven ashore and wrecked at Madras with the loss of most of her crew.
Nossa Senhora de Monte	Portugal	The brig capsized at Madras with the loss of seventeen of her 24 crew.
Rama	France	The full-rigged ship was wrecked near Pondicherry with the loss of eight of her crew.
Soorawarasawmy	India	The sloop was wrecked near Porto Novo with the loss of a crew member. She was on a voyage from Calingapatnam to Madras.
Vuncatashawaraloo	India	The sloop was wrecked near Cuddalore with the loss of two of her crew. She was on a voyage from Vizagapatam to Madras.
Wuzeer	United Kingdom	The ship was wrecked on the Cherbaniani Reef, north of the Laccadive Islands. Her crew survived. She was on a voyage from Liverpool, Lancashire to Bombay, India.

== 28 March ==
List of shipwrecks: March 1853
Ship	State	Description
Louisa	United Kingdom	The ship was destroyed by fire off Berbice, British Guiana. Her crew were rescued.
Schau	Russia	The ship ran aground and was wrecked off Skagen, Denmark. Her crew were rescued. She was on a voyage from South Shields, County Durham, United Kingdom to Ventava, Courland Governorate.
St. George	(United Kingdom of Great Britain and Ireland) British North America	The ship was abandoned in the Atlantic Ocean. Her 21 crew were rescued by the barque Eliza (United Kingdom). St. George was on a voyage from Glasgow, Renfrewshire to Boston, Massachusetts, United States.
William	United Kingdom	The schooner ran aground on the Corton Sand, in the North Sea off the coast of Suffolk.
Woodcock	United Kingdom	The flat was run down and sunk in the River Mersey by George Canning (United Kingdom).

== 29 March ==
List of shipwrecks: 29 March 1853
Ship	State	Description
Essex	United Kingdom	The ship ran aground on the Barber Sand, in the North Sea off te coast of Norfolk. She was refloated and resumed her voyage.
Fame	United Kingdom	The ship was wrecked on the Boulmer Rock, Northumberland.
Victoria	United Kingdom	The hovelling lugger foundered in the Gull Stream, off the coast of Kent with the loss of three of her four crew. The survivor was rescued by Fawn (United Kingdom).
Unnamed	United Kingdom	The schooner was in collision with the steamship (United Kingdom) and foundered in the Irish Sea off the Calf of Man, Isle of Man with the loss of all hands.

== 30 March ==
List of shipwrecks: 30 March 1853
Ship	State	Description
Cadet	United Kingdom	The brig sank at Valparaíso, Chile.
Lord Cochrane	United Kingdom	The brig sank at Valparaíso.
Osprey	United States	The brig was driven ashore on "Sevenmile Beach", United States. She was on a voyage from Puerto Rico to Philadelphia, Pennsylvania, United States. She was declared a total loss.
Scotch	United Kingdom	The steamship ran aground 20 nautical miles (37 km) off Belfast, County Antrim. All on board, about 200 people, were rescued.

== 31 March ==
List of shipwrecks: 31 March 1853
Ship	State	Description
Bristol	United Kingdom	The ship was driven ashore at Swansea, Glamorgan.
Caspian	United Kingdom	The ship ran aground on the Skagen Reef. She was on a voyage from Whitby, Yorkshire to Memel, Prussia. She was refloated and taken in to Helsingør, Denmark for repairs.
Chieftain	United Kingdom	The ship was driven ashore at Swansea.
Emma Tully	United Kingdom	The ship struck the Passage Rock and was consequently beached at Akyab, Burma. She was on a voyage from the Cape of Good Hope, Cape Colony to Ceylon and Akyab. She was temporarily repaired, refloated and taken in to Calcutta, India for permanent repairs.
Febro	Bremen	The brig ran aground on the Goodwin Sands, Kent, United Kingdom.
General Koyle	United Kingdom	The ship ran aground off Havre de Grâce, Seine-Inférieure, France. She was on a voyage from Havre de Grâce to Sunderland, County Durham.
Generous	United Kingdom	The brig was driven ashore and wrecked at Saint-Quentin-en-Tourmont, Somme, France. She was on a voyage from Havre de Grâce, Seine-Inférieure, France to Sunderland, County Durham. Generous was refloated on 8 April and taken in to Le Crotoy, Somme.
Lady Newborough	United Kingdom	The ship was driven ashore near Porthdinllaen, Caernarfonshire. She was on a voyage from Port Talbot, Glamorgan to Amlwch, Anglesey. She was refloated on 7 April and taken in to Porthdinllaen.
Myrtle	United Kingdom	The ship was wrecked at Loughshinny, County Dublin. Her crew were rescued.
Star of Brunswick	United Kingdom	The ship was driven ashore at Crosby Point, Lancashire. She was on a voyage from Bideford, Devon to Liverpool, Lancashire. She was refloated on 23 April and taken in to Liverpool.
Thornly	United Kingdom	The brig sank at Sunderland, County Durham. She was refloated.
Trust in Providence	United Kingdom	The trawler was driven ashore at St. Mawes, Cornwall.
Two Brothers	United Kingdom	The smack was driven ashore and wrecked at St. Anthony Head, Cornwall with the loss of one of her two crew.
Victor	United Kingdom	The ship was driven ashore at Swansea.
Warbler	United Kingdom	The ship ran aground on the Burbo Bank, in Liverpool Bay. She was on a voyage from New Orleans, Louisiana, United States to Liverpool. She was refloated.

== Unknown date ==
List of shipwrecks: Unknown date in March 1853
Ship	State	Description
Alibi	United Kingdom	On 8 March 1853, the ship ran aground on a reef 60 nautical miles (110 km) north of Fremantle, Swan River Colony. She was on a voyage from Singapore to Port Phillip, Victoria. She was refloated and out in to Fremantle, where she arrived on 18 March.
Augusta	France	The barque was wrecked at Laguna. Her crew were rescued. She was on a voyage from Laguna to Havre de Grâce, Seine-Inférieure.
Ceres	(United Kingdom of Great Britain and Ireland) British North America	The schooner was wrecked at St. Shott's, Newfoundland in mid-March.
Henrietta	United Kingdom	The ship foundered in the Pacific Ocean west of Cape Horn, Chile. Her crew were rescued. She was on a voyage from Cardiff, Glamorgan to Panama City, Republic of New Granada.
Indienne	French Navy	The corvette was wrecked at "Amboutatou", Madagascar.
Jesse Stephens	United Kingdom	The barque was abandoned in the Atlantic Ocean. Her sixteen crew were rescued by the steamship Pacific (United States). Jesse Stephens was on a voyage from New York to Liverpool, Lancashire.
Johannes	Kingdom of Hanover	The schooner barque was wrecked.
Joseph Wheeler	United Kingdom	The ship ran aground and was damaged on the South Point Reef. She was on a voyage from Liverpool, Lancashire to Barbados. She was refloated and completed her voyage, arriving on 24 March.
Lady Eglintoune	United Kingdom	The ship was driven ashore at Trefusis Point, Cornwall. She was refloated on 24 March and beached at Falmouth, Cornwall.
Margaret	United Kingdom	The ship was driven ashore south of Bridlington, Yorkshire. She was refloated on 9 March and taken in to Bridlington.
Moses Taylor	United Kingdom	The ship was wrecked at the mouth of the Mississippi River. She was on a voyage from New Orleans, Louisiana to Liverpool. She was refloated on 29 March and put back to New Orleans for repairs.
Nathaniel	United Kingdom	The ship was driven ashore at Bridlington. She was on a voyage from London to South Shields, County Durham. She was refloated on 8 March and taken in to Bridlington.
Neptune	United Kingdom	The ship ran aground in the River Tyne near the Stanhope Drops. She was on a voyage from the River Tyne to Havre de Grâce, Seine-Inférieure and British North America. She was refloated on 17 March.
HMS Rattler	Royal Navy	The sloop-of-war struck a sunken rock at Amoy, China was damaged. She was beached at Tae-tan (today's Dadan Island, Lieyu Township, Kinmen County, Fujian, Republic of China (Taiwan)) for repairs.
Reindeer	United Kingdom	The ship was discovered abandoned off Cape San Antonio, Argentina. She was on a voyage from Valparaíso, Chile to Montevideo, Uruguay. She was subsequently taken in to Buenos Aires, Argentina, where she arrived on 2 April.
Tennessee	United States	The steamship was wrecked near San Francisco, California before 15 March. All on board were rescued.
HMS Wasp	Royal Navy	The Archer-class sloop was driven ashore whilst on a voyage from Corfu to Constantinople, Ottoman Empire. She was refloated and taken in to Malta for repairs.
Wilmington	United States	The brig was abandoned in the Atlantic Ocean before 14 February.
Witch	United Kingdom	The cutter was abandoned in the Atlantic Ocean. Her crew were rescued by Freia (United Kingdom). Witch was on a voyage from Cardiff, Glamorgan to Lisbon, Portugal.
