= HDMS Najaden =

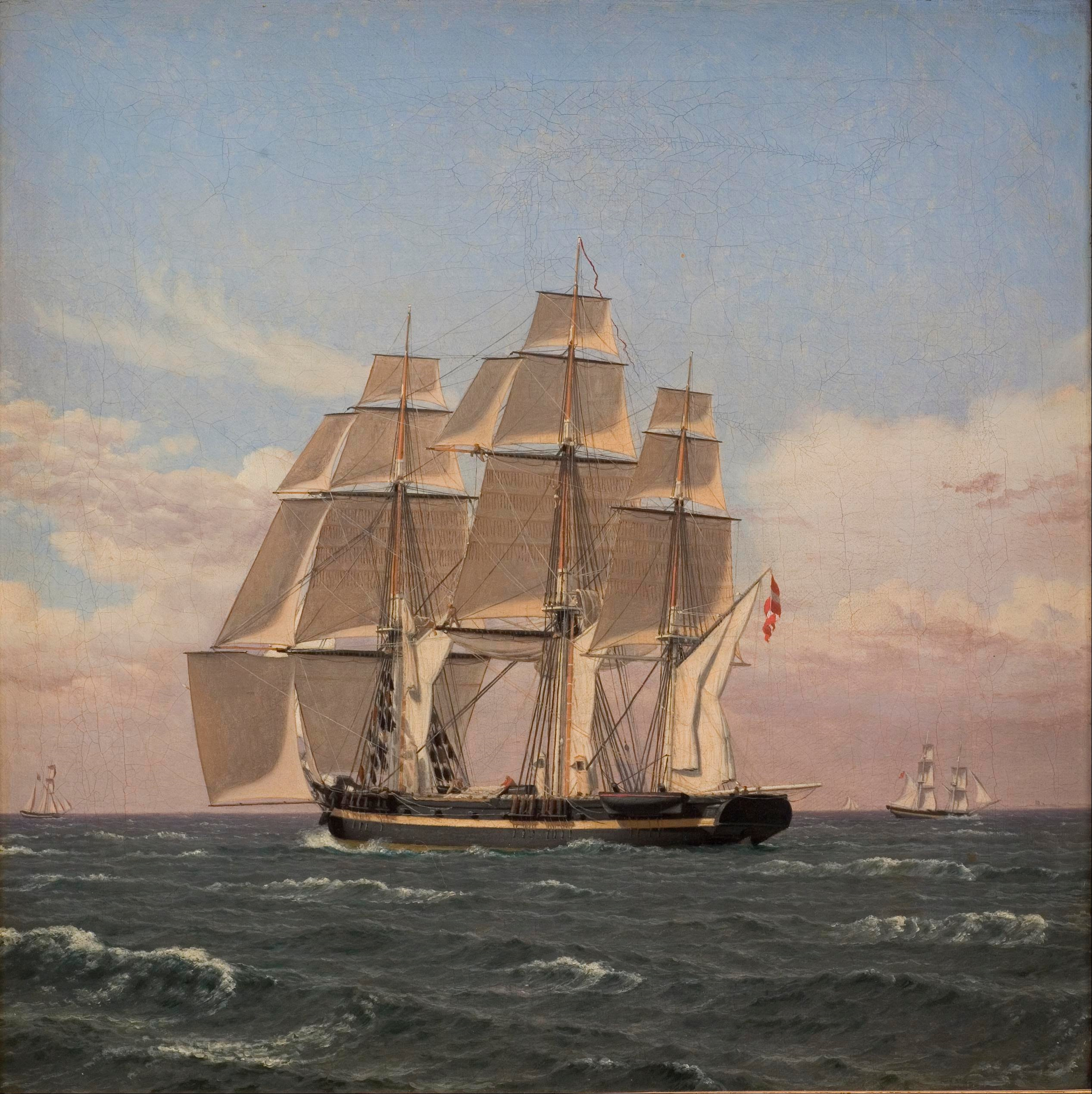
The corvette Najaden under sail, by Christoffer Wilhelm Eckersberg

Several ships of the Royal Danish-Norwegian Navy (1509–1814) and the Royal Danish Navy have borne the name Najaden, after the mythological water spirit, including:

- HDMS Najaden (1796), a frigate (1796–1807)
- HDMS Najaden (1811), a frigate (1811–1812)
- HDMS Najaden (1820), a corvette (1820–1852)
- HDMS Najaden (1854), a corvette (1854–1865)
- HDMS Najaden (1913), a submarine (1913–1931)
- HDMS Willemoes (1947), a torpedo boat (1947–1966), originally named Najaden
- HDMS Najaden (1963), a patrol vessel (Danish: bevogtningsfartøj) (1963–1991)
- HDMS Najaden (P523), a Diana-class patrol vessel

== See also ==
- HSwMS Najaden
- Najaden, 1858 to 1907 - a Norwegian commercial brig (history)
- STS Kapitan Borchardt, 1918, a gaff-schooner called Najaden until 2011
