= HMS Naiad =

Several ships of the Royal Navy have been named HMS Naiad after a Greek mythological figure, the Naiad

- HMS Naiad (1783), formerly the Naiade, which Sceptre, a 64-gun third-rate, captured off Trincomalee on the night of 11 April 1783. Naïade was armed with eighteen to twenty 8-pounder guns and ten swivel guns and had a crew of 160 men. She had a burthen of 640 tons, and measured 126'8" (deck) by 33'8½" (breadth) by 10'2" (hold depth). The British armed her with twenty-two 12-pounder guns, and two 18-pounder and six 12-pounder carronade, but never commissioned her; they then sold her 17 August 1784.
- HMS Naiad (1797), a fifth-rate frigate launched in 1797 and commissioned in 1798. She was paid off in 1826 and then served for many years in Latin America as a depot ship, first for the Royal Navy and then for the Pacific Steam Navigation Company. She was broken up in 1898.
- HMS Naiad (1890), an Apollo-class second class protected cruiser launched in 1890 and sold in 1922.
- HMS Naiad (93), a Dido-class cruiser launched in 1939 and torpedoed and sunk by a U-boat on 11 March 1942.
- HMS Naiad (F39), a Leander-class frigate launched in 1963 and decommissioned in 1987.

== See also ==
- HSwMS Najad
