= HSwMS Najaden =

Several ships of the Swedish Navy have borne the name Najaden, including:

- HSwMS Najaden (1834), a corvette launched in 1834 and decommissioned in 1874
- HSwMS Najaden (1897), a three-masted, wooden hulled sailing ship launched in 1897 as a training ship and decommissioned in 1938, now preserved as a museum ship

== See also ==
- HSwMS Najad
- HDMS Najaden
