= HSwMS Najad (1979) =

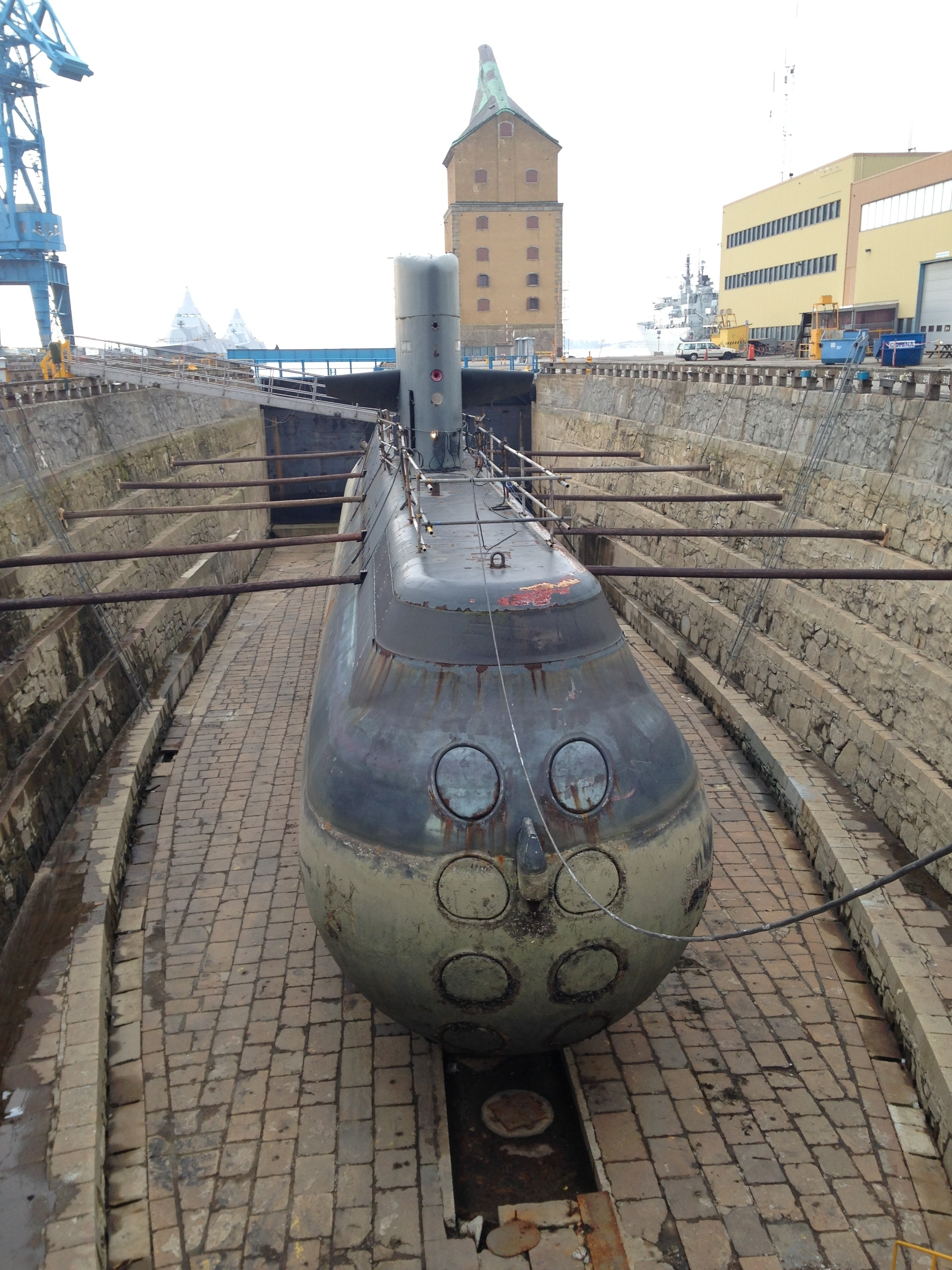
- HSwMS Najad in dry dock on 25 February 2014.

History

Sweden
- Name: HSwMS Najad
- Ordered: 1976
- Builder: Kockums, Malmö
- Launched: 13 August 1979
- Commissioned: 26 June 1981
- Decommissioned: 1998
- Motto: Robur et forma ("Strength and beauty")
- Nickname(s): Nad
- Fate: Scrapped, 2015

General characteristics
- Class & type: Näcken-class submarine
- Displacement: 980 tonnes (960 long tons) surfaced; 1,150 tonnes (1,130 long tons) submerged
- Length: 49.5 m (162 ft 5 in)
- Beam: 5.7 m (18 ft 8 in)
- Draught: 5.5 m (18 ft 1 in)
- Depth: 300 m (980 ft)
- Propulsion: 2 × MTU diesel engines; 1 × Jeumont-Schneider electric motor; 2 shaft
- Speed: 20 knots (37 km/h; 23 mph) surfaced; 25 knots (46 km/h; 29 mph) submerged
- Test depth: 150 m (490 ft)
- Complement: 19 (5 officers)
- Sensors & processing systems: FAS
- Armament: 6 × 533 mm (21 in) torpedo tubes; 2 × 400 mm (16 in) torpedo tubes; Mines

HSwMS Najad is the third of three Näcken-class submarines, built for the Swedish Navy, project name A14. She was launched at the Kockums shipyard in Malmö, Sweden, on 13 August 1979, and completed and commissioned into the Swedish Navy on 26 June 1981.

== Gallery ==
HSwMS Najad Gallery

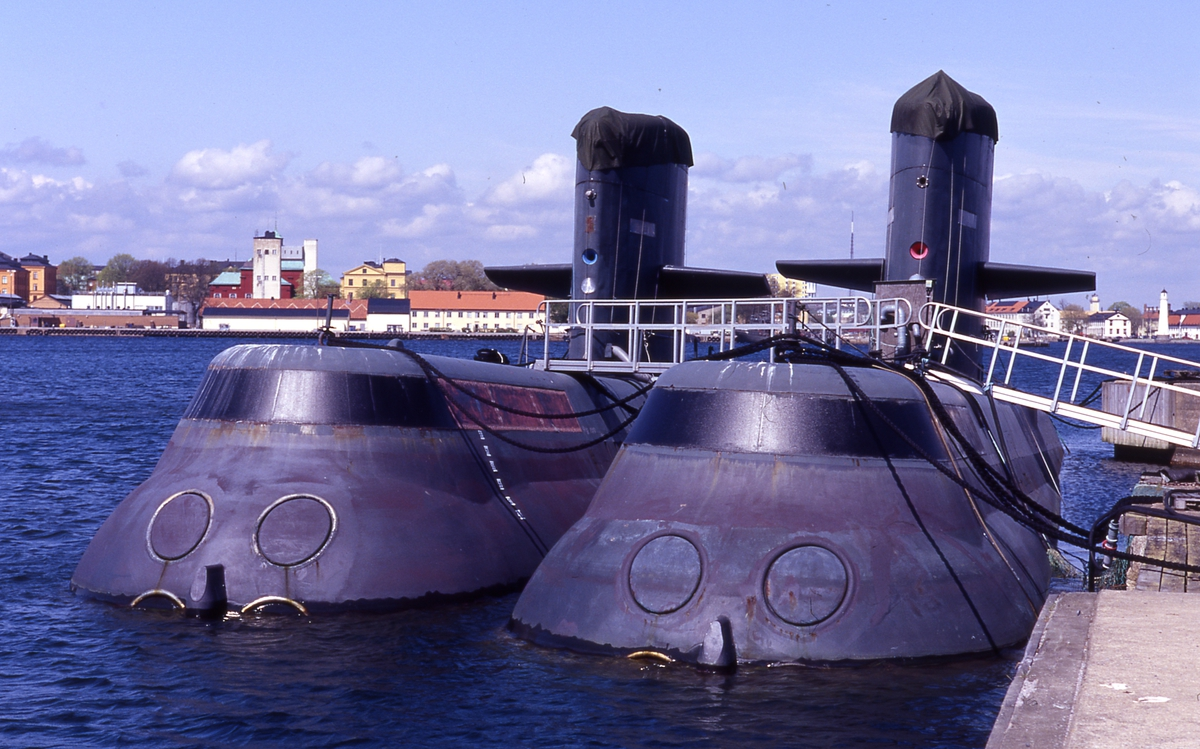
HSwMS Neptun and HSwMS Najad at Karlskrona, Sweden. 2003.
