= HSwMS Södermanland (1988) =

Swedish submarine

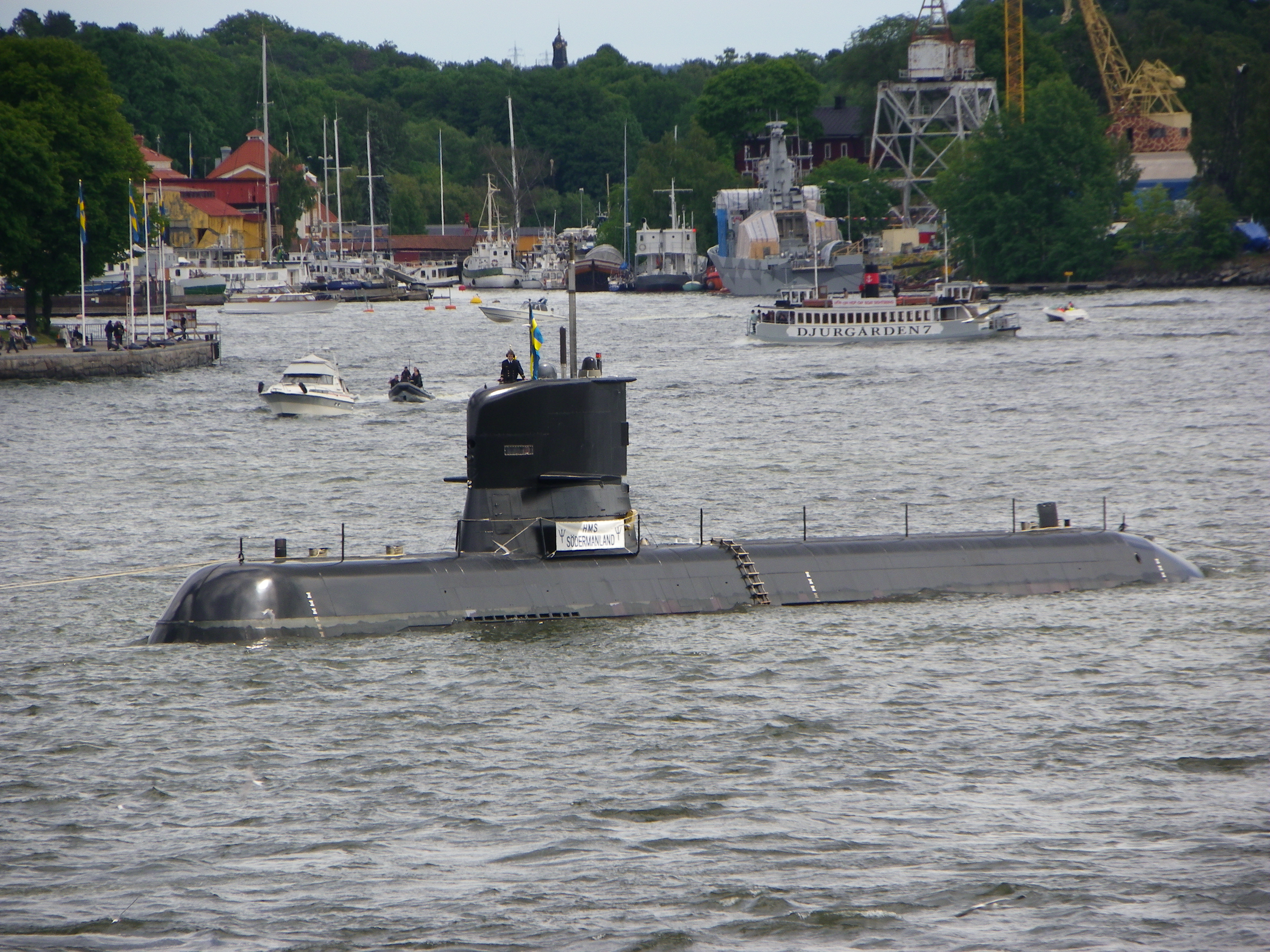
- HSwMS Södermanland underway in Stockholm on 12 June 2010.

History

Sweden
- Name: HSwMS Södermanland
- Namesake: Södermanland, Sweden
- Ordered: 1980s
- Builder: Kockums
- Launched: 21 April 1988
- Commissioned: 21 April 1989
- Motto: Crypst corripit ("Gripen surprises and chops")
- Nickname(s): Söd
- Status: Active
- Badge

General characteristics
- Class & type: Västergötland-class submarine; Södermanland-class submarine
- Displacement: 1,400 t (1,378 long tons) surfaced; 1,500 t (1,476 long tons) submerged
- Length: 60.5 m (198 ft 6 in)
- Beam: 6.1 m (20 ft 0 in)
- Propulsion: 2 × Hedemora diesel generators; 2 × Kockums v4-275R Sterling AIP units
- Speed: 8 knots (15 km/h; 9.2 mph) (surfaced) 15 knots (28 km/h; 17 mph) (submerged)
- Complement: 28 officers and enlisted
- Armament: 6 × (533 mm (21 in) torpedo tubes); 3 × (400 mm (16 in) torpedo tubes)

HSwMS Södermanland (Söd) is a Swedish naval submarine, launched in 1988 and currently in active service. She is the third ship of the Västergötland-class submarine and named after Södermanland, Sweden.

== Development ==
The submarine design combined the best properties from the Sjöormen class and the Näcken class. Submarines of the Västergötland class had greater submarine hunting capacity than previous classes, partly due to the fact that they were equipped with a new modern submarine torpedo. The submarines in the Västergötland class were able to fire up to six heavy and six light wire-guided torpedoes at the same time against different targets.

The Västergötland class included the submarines HSwMS Södermanland and HSwMS Östergötland. After significant upgrades, these two submarines were reclassified to a new Södermanland class.

== Career ==
Between 2000 and 2004, Södermanland and Östergötland underwent extensive modifications, were extended by 12 metres (39 ft) and fitted with air-independent Stirling engines. At the same time, the submarines would be modified to handle international missions with operations in hot and salty waters. The conversion of the two submarines became so extensive that Kockums decided to reclassify the submarines to a new Södermanland class.

During 2022, Södermanland underwent yet another life extension program, in order to be operational until 2028.

As Östergötland was decommissioned in 2021, Södermanland is the only remaining submarine in its class.

=== Planned Lease to Poland ===
In a deal with Poland where Poland will buy three A26 Blekinge class submarines from Swedish Saab Kockums the HSwMS Södermanland will be leased by Poland to train their crew on modern western submarines. The submarine will be handed over in 2027 and serve until the new A26 submarine will enter the service.
