= Södermanland-class submarine =

Swedish submarine class

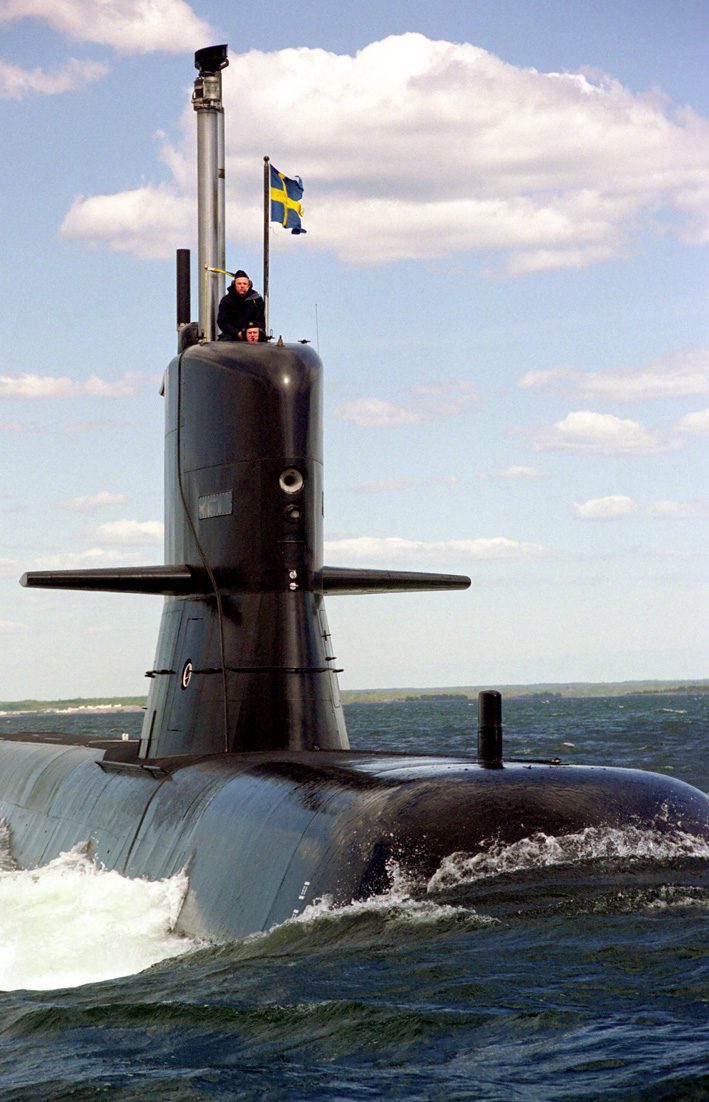
- HSwMS Södermanland at sea

Class overview
- Name: Södermanland class
- Builders: Kockums
- Operators: Swedish Navy
- Preceded by: Näcken class
- Succeeded by: Gotland class
- Cost: around 170 million euros per ship
- In commission: 1989–present
- Planned: 4
- Completed: 2
- Canceled: 2
- Active: 1
- Retired: 1

General characteristics
- Displacement: Submerged: 1,500 t (1,500 long tons; 1,700 short tons)
- Length: 60.5 m (198 ft 6 in)
- Beam: 6.1 m (20 ft 0 in)
- Draft: 5.6 m (18 ft 4 in)
- Propulsion: 2 × Hedemora Diesel-electric engines; 2 × Kockums v4-275R Stirling AIP units
- Speed: Submerged: 20 kn (37 km/h; 23 mph)
- Complement: 24
- Sensors & processing systems: FAS
- Armament: 6 × 533 mm (21.0 in) torpedo tubes; 3 × 400 mm (15.7 in) torpedo tubes; Mines

The Swedish Södermanland class of diesel-electric submarines consists of HSwMS Södermanland and HSwMS Östergötland. They are one of two subclasses/derivations of the Västergötland-class submarines of the Swedish Navy originally designed and built in the 1980s.

== Design ==
These two submarines were originally launched as Västergötland-class submarines in 1987 and 1990, and were relaunched as a new class after extensive modernization in 2003 and 2004 by Kockums AB. The pressure hull had been cut in two after the sail and a 12 m (39 ft 4 in) long new section with an air-independent propulsion system was inserted. It contains two Stirling engines which are coupled to electric generators and heated by burning diesel fuel with liquid oxygen stored in cryogenic tanks. The AIP system can provide electric energy to extend the submarine's submerged time from days to weeks. Two submarines of similar design, known as the Archer class are in service with the Republic of Singapore Navy.

== Operational History ==
As of 2023, Södermanland is planned to remain in service until at least 2024-25 when it was to be replaced by the future Blekinge-class submarines. However, the Östergötland was decommissioned in 2021, and is in material reserve.

=== Lease to Poland ===
In late November 2025, Sweden and Poland reached an agreement linked to Poland's planned acquisition of three A26 submarines under the Orka programme by the Polish Navy to replace its older Kilo class Submarine ORP Orzel, in which Sweden would provide the ageing but still operational submarine HMS Södermanland as an interim “gap-filler”. According to the report, Poland is expected to gain access to the vessel around 2027, temporarily reducing Sweden's submarine fleet by one unit for several years; Swedish Defence Minister Pål Jonson stated that this temporary gap would not weaken Sweden's strategic position in the Baltic Sea.

== Units ==
Ship name	Laid down	Launched	Commissioned	Service	Status
Södermanland		12 April 1988	21 April 1989	1st Submarine Flotilla	Refitted 2003, Active and to be leased to Poland, underwent life-extension and re-launched in 2024 allowing for service until 2030
Östergötland		9 December 1988	1989	1st Submarine Flotilla	Refitted 2004, Decommissioned 2021
