= HSwMS Näcken (1978) =

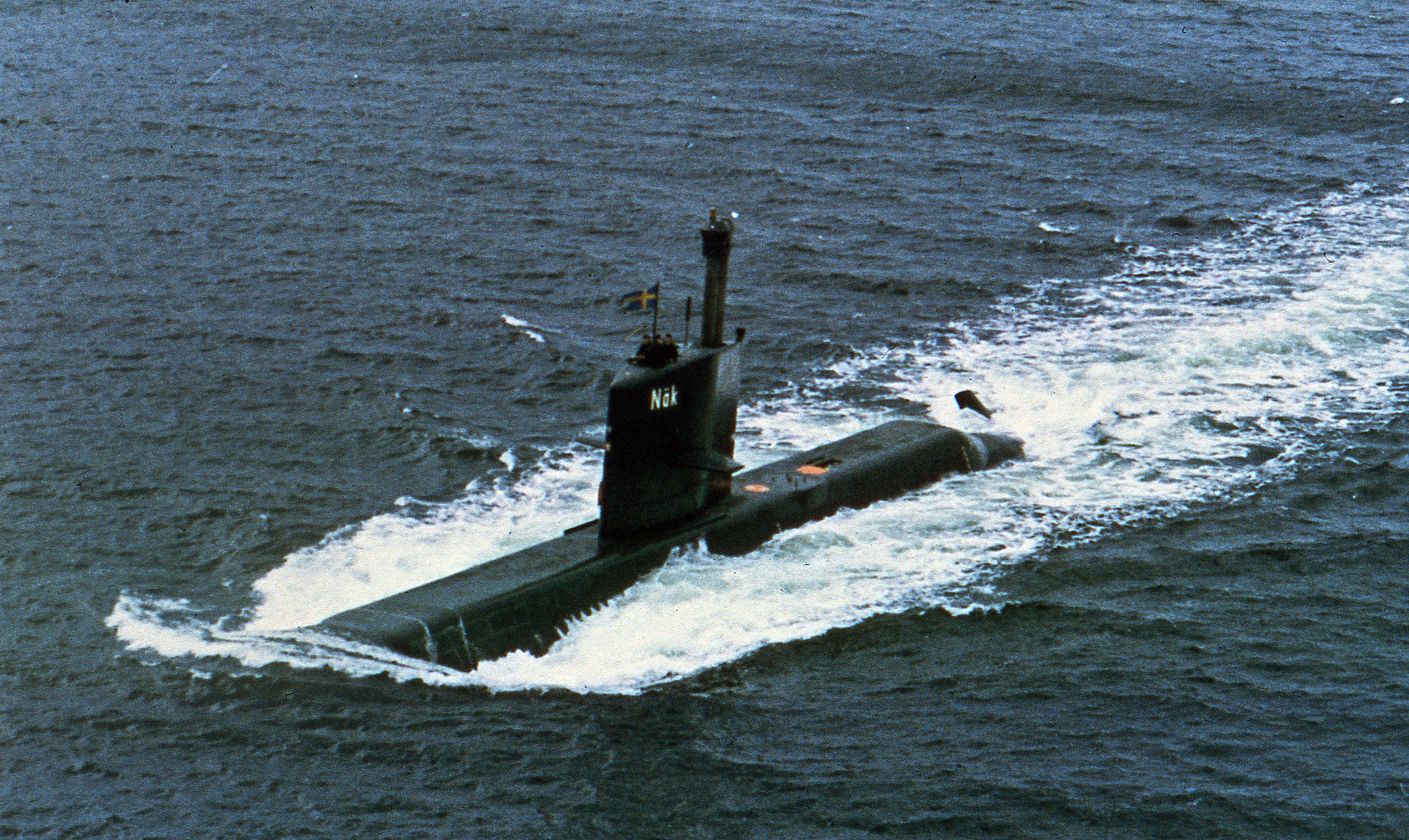
- HSwMS Näcken

History

Sweden
- Name: HSwMS Näcken
- Ordered: 1972
- Awarded: 22 March 1973
- Builder: Kockums, Malmö
- Laid down: November 1972
- Launched: 17 April 1978
- Commissioned: 25 April 1980
- Decommissioned: 17 August 2001
- Recommissioned: 2005
- Fate: Scrapped 2016

Denmark
- Name: HDMS Kronborg
- Acquired: 2001
- Commissioned: 17 August 2001
- Decommissioned: 27 October 2004
- Identification: S325
- Fate: Returned to Sweden 2005

General characteristics
- Class & type: Näcken-class submarine
- Displacement: 980 tonnes (960 long tons) surfaced; 1,150 tonnes (1,130 long tons) submerged
- Length: 57.5 m (188 ft 8 in)
- Beam: 5.7 m (18 ft 8 in)
- Draught: 5.5 m (18 ft 1 in)
- Depth: 300 m (980 ft)
- Propulsion: 2 × MTU diesel engines; 1 × Jeumont-Schneider electric motor; 1 shaft
- Speed: 20 knots (37 km/h; 23 mph) surfaced; 25 knots (46 km/h; 29 mph) submerged
- Test depth: 150 m (490 ft)
- Complement: 19 (5 officers)
- Sensors & processing systems: FAS
- Armament: 6 × 533 mm (21 in) torpedo tubes; 2 × 400 mm (16 in) torpedo tubes; Mines

HSwMS Näcken was the lead ship of her class of submarine for the Swedish Navy. She was launched at the Kockums shipyard in Malmö, Sweden, on 17 April 1978, and completed and commissioned into the Swedish Navy in April 1980. From 2001 to 2005, the submarine was leased to the Royal Danish Navy and operated as HDMS Kronborg (S325). She was restored to her original name of Näcken upon her return to Swedish control. She was scrapped in Karlskrona during 2015–2016.

== History ==
=== Refit ===
In November 1987, Näcken began a major refit at Kockums. This involved installing two closed circuit Tilsa Stirling diesel engines. This new diesel, the Stirling V4-275R, provides air-independent propulsion which allows the submarine to operate continuously underwater. However, in order to incorporate the new engine, the ship was lengthened by 8 metres (26 ft). The refit took until 6 September 1988. The endurance of the vessel, following refit, increased to 14 days. Näcken became the test bed for the technology which was used in the later Gotland class.

The ship had further modifications between 1993 and 1996. This comprised improved weapon control systems, automated torpedo tube loading and new sonar.

=== Transfer to Denmark ===
Näcken was transferred to Denmark in 2001 as part of a deal for the design and construction of the Viking-class project. The boat was leased by Denmark with an option to buy in 2005. Before the transfer, Denmark had the communications systems aboard upgraded. The submarine was recommissioned as Kronborg on 17 August 2001 at Aalborg. Denmark had acquired Kronborg partly to keep a submarine service and partly to train crews on air-independent propulsion in preparation for the Viking class. However, in June 2004, the Danish parliament voted to end the submarine service. On 27 October 2004, Kronborg was decommissioned at Karlskrona and returned to Sweden.
