= HSwMS Neptun (1979) =

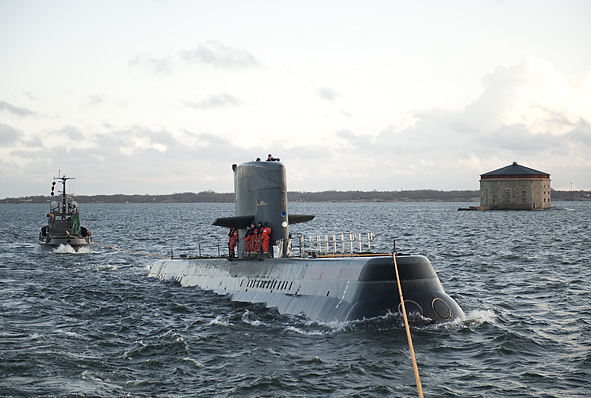
- Neptun under tow in 2011

History

Sweden
- Name: Neptun
- Builder: Kockums, Malmö
- Laid down: March 1974
- Launched: 13 August 1979
- Commissioned: 5 December 1980
- Decommissioned: 1998
- Status: Museum ship

General characteristics
- Class & type: Näcken-class
- Displacement: 980 long tons (1,000 t) surfaced; 1,150 long tons (1,170 t) submerged
- Length: 49.5 m (162 ft 5 in) oa; 44.0 m (144 ft 4 in) waterline
- Beam: 5.7 m (18 ft 8 in)
- Draught: 18 m (59 ft 1 in)
- Propulsion: 1 × MTU 16V652 diesel engine; 2,100 bhp (1,600 kW); 1 × Jeumont-Schneider Electric motor 1,540 hp (1,150 kW)
- Speed: 10 kn (19 km/h; 12 mph) surfaced; 20 kn (37 km/h; 23 mph) submerged
- Complement: 19
- Armament: 6 × 533 mm torpedo tubes; 2 × 400 mm torpedo tubes

HSwMS Neptun is the second of three Näcken-class submarines, built to operate in the Baltic. Neptun entered service in December 1980. The next year she was involved an international incident when the Soviet submarine U 137 ran aground outside Karlskrona.

The Näcken class were among the first Swedish submarines to have onboard computers. Her task in the eventuality of war would have been to attack enemy shipping and surveillance duties.

Neptun was decommissioned in 1998 and laid up in Karlskrona. In 2008 she was donated to the Naval Museum Marinmuseum of Karlskrona, Sweden, where she is after restoration on display since 2014.

== Gallery ==
HSwMS Neptun Gallery

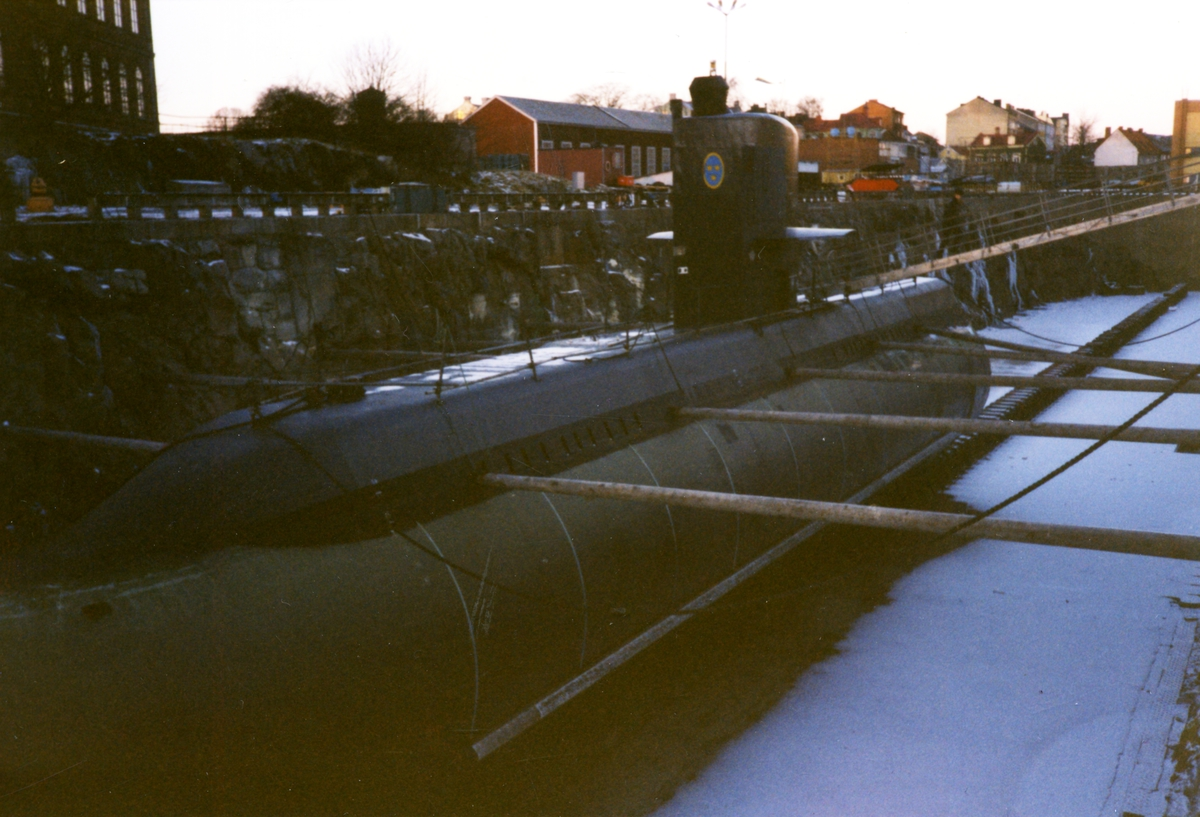
HSwMS Neptun in drydock in 1998.

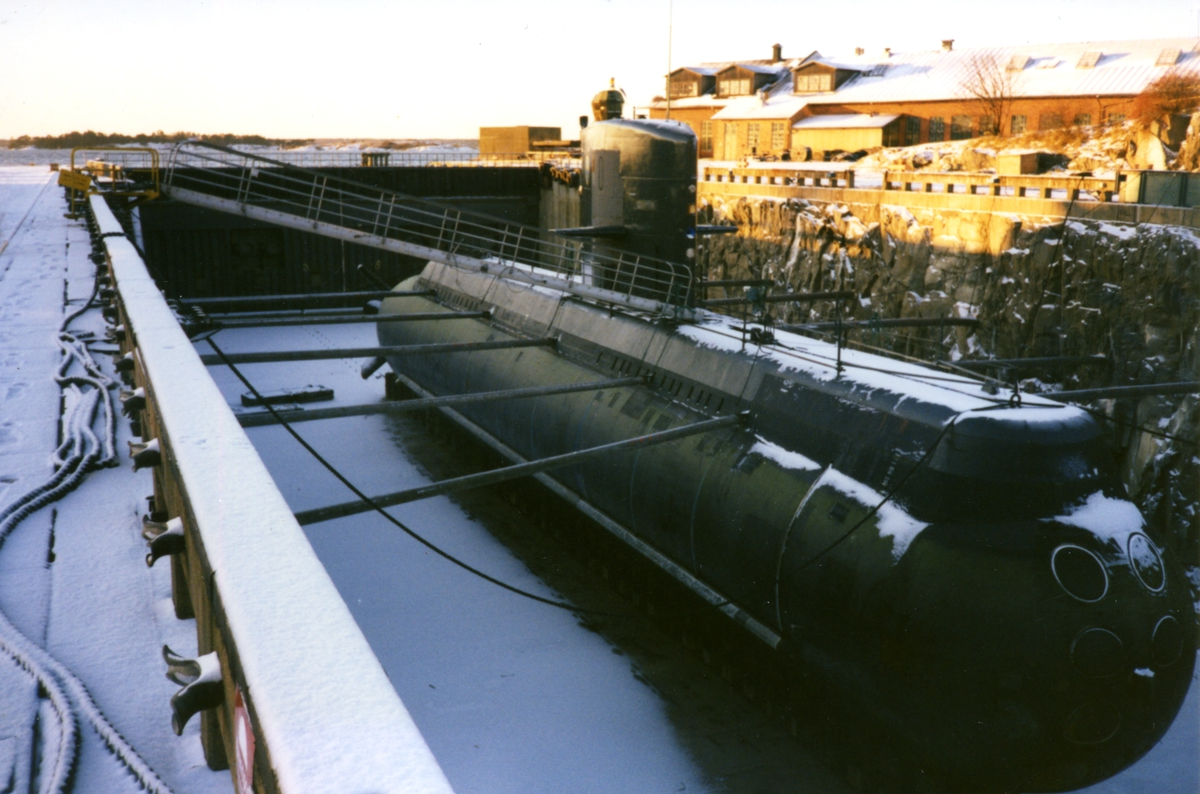
HSwMS Neptun in drydock in 1998.

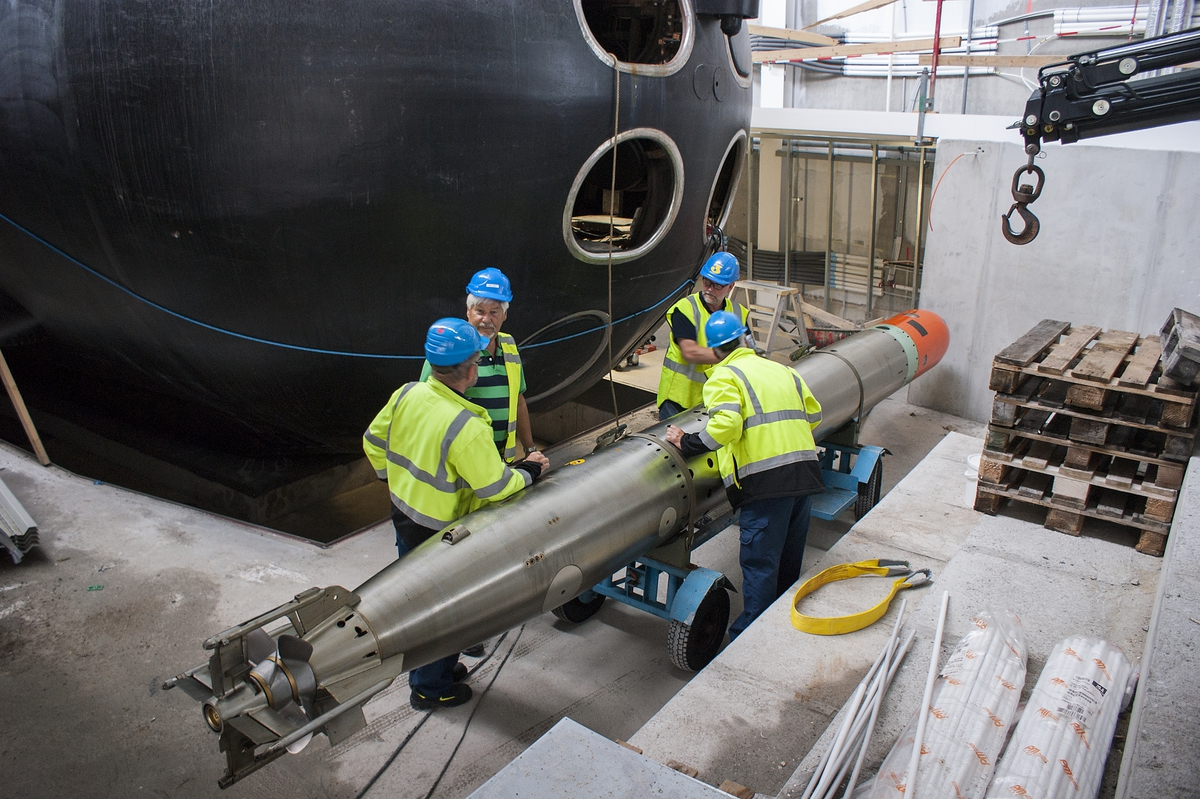
Torpedo 613 being loaded into HSwMS Neptun Inside the museum on 31 July 2013.

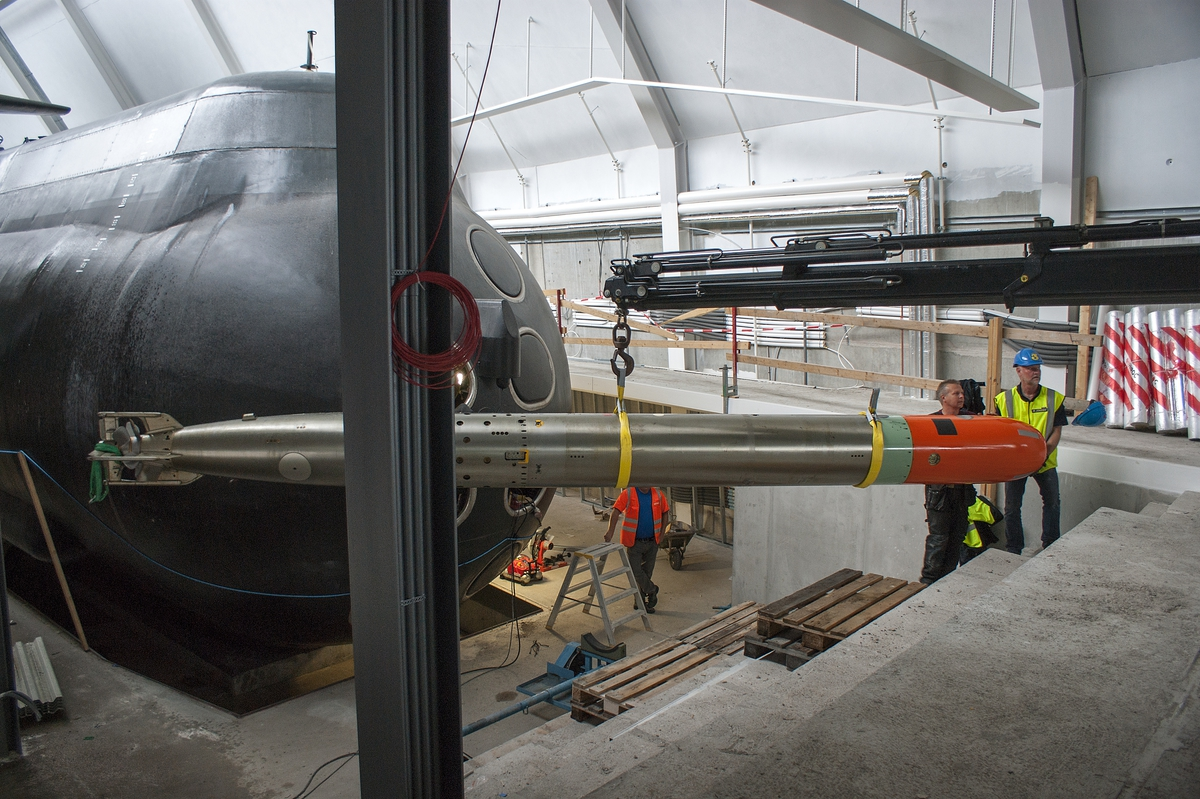
Torpedo 613 being loaded into HSwMS Neptun Inside the museum on 31 July 2013.

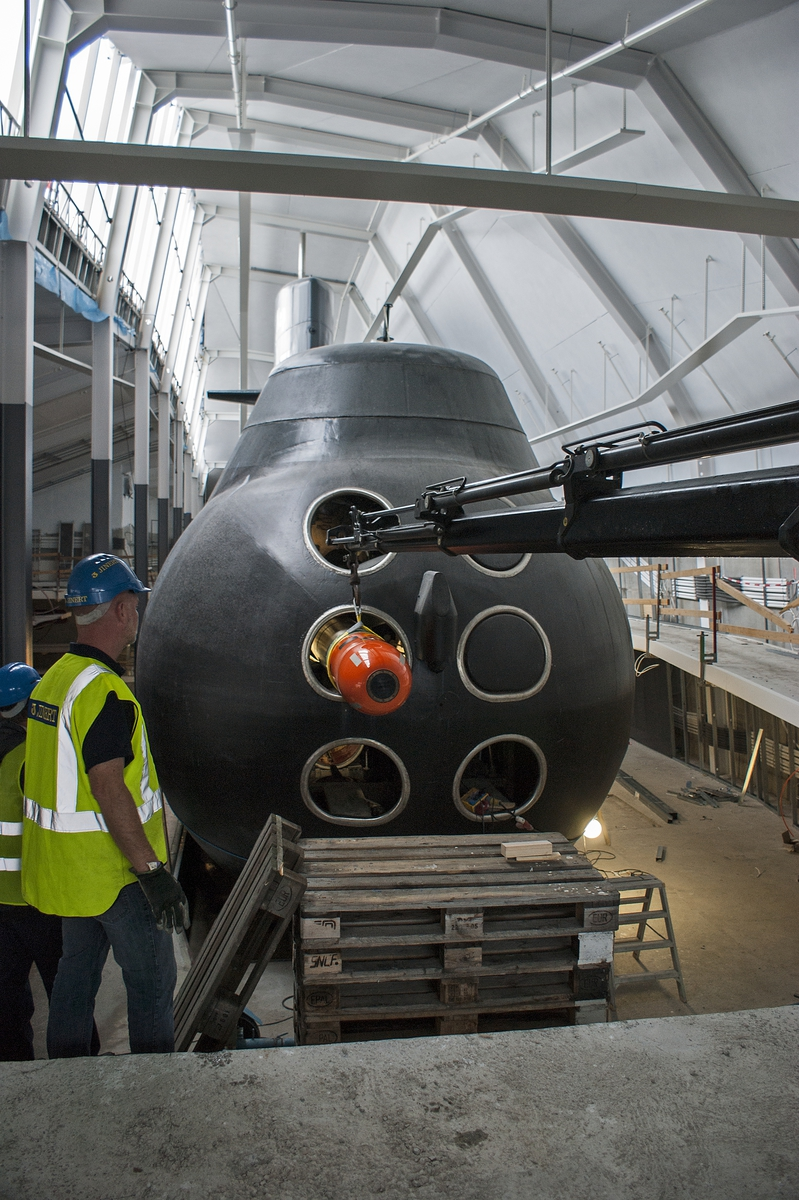
Torpedo 613 being loaded into HSwMS Neptun Inside the museum on 31 July 2013.

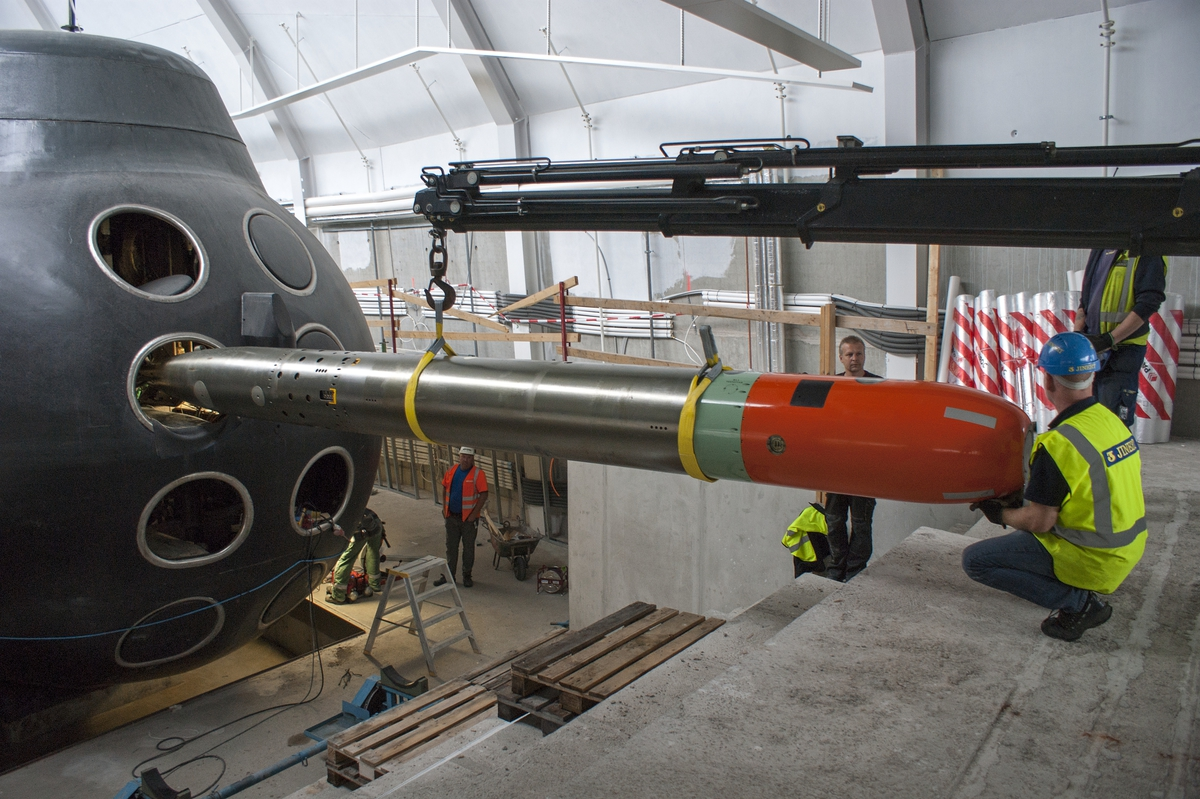
Torpedo 613 being loaded into HSwMS Neptun Inside the museum on 31 July 2013.

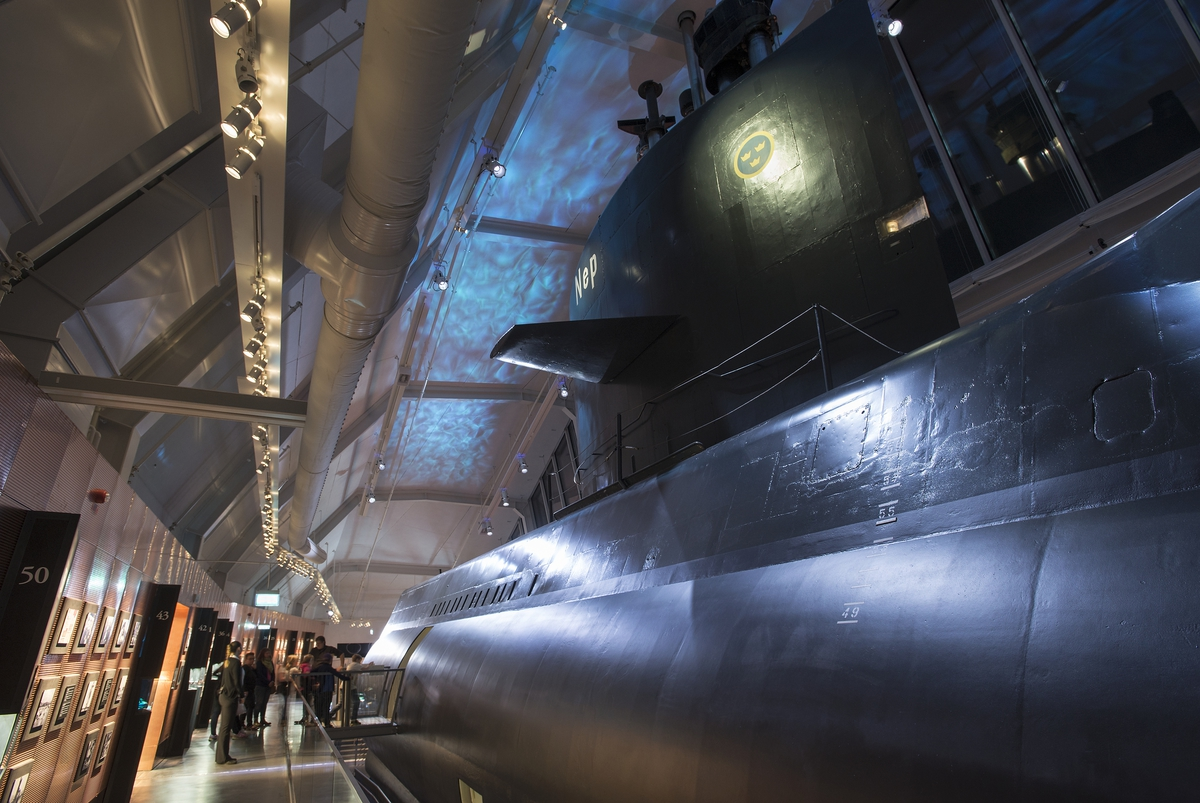
HSwMS Neptun museum taken on 1 June 2015 in Karlskrona, Sweden.

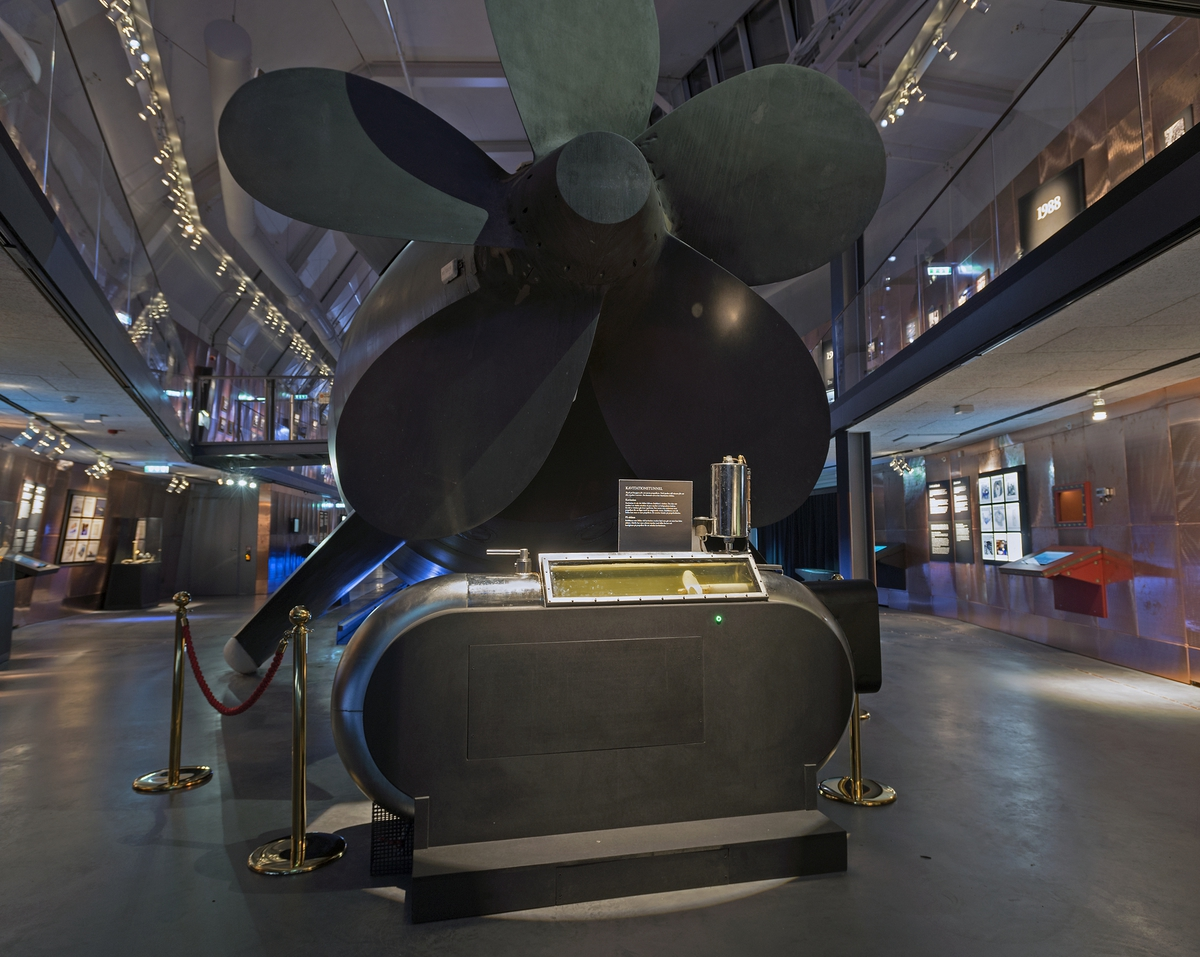
HSwMS Neptun museum taken on 1 June 2015 in Karlskrona, Sweden.

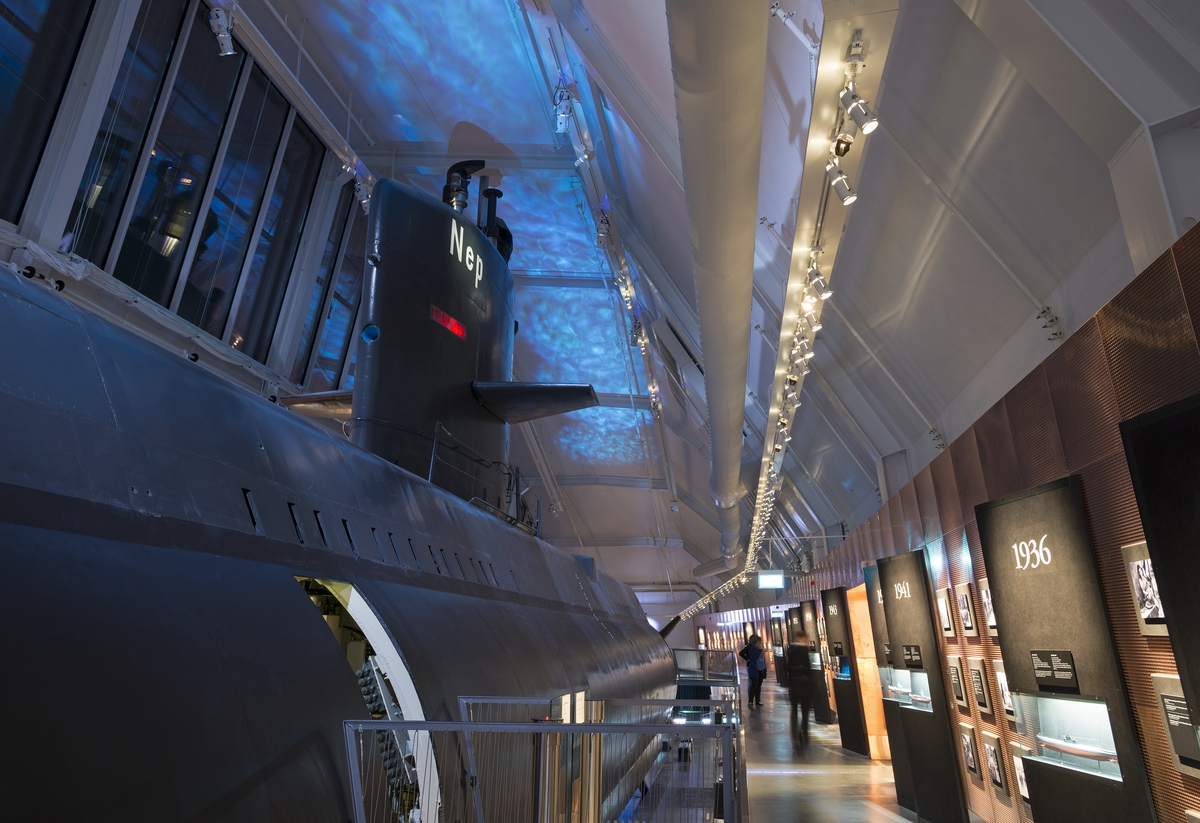
HSwMS Neptun museum taken on 1 June 2015 in Karlskrona, Sweden.
