= Västergötland-class submarine =

Swedish underwater naval vessel

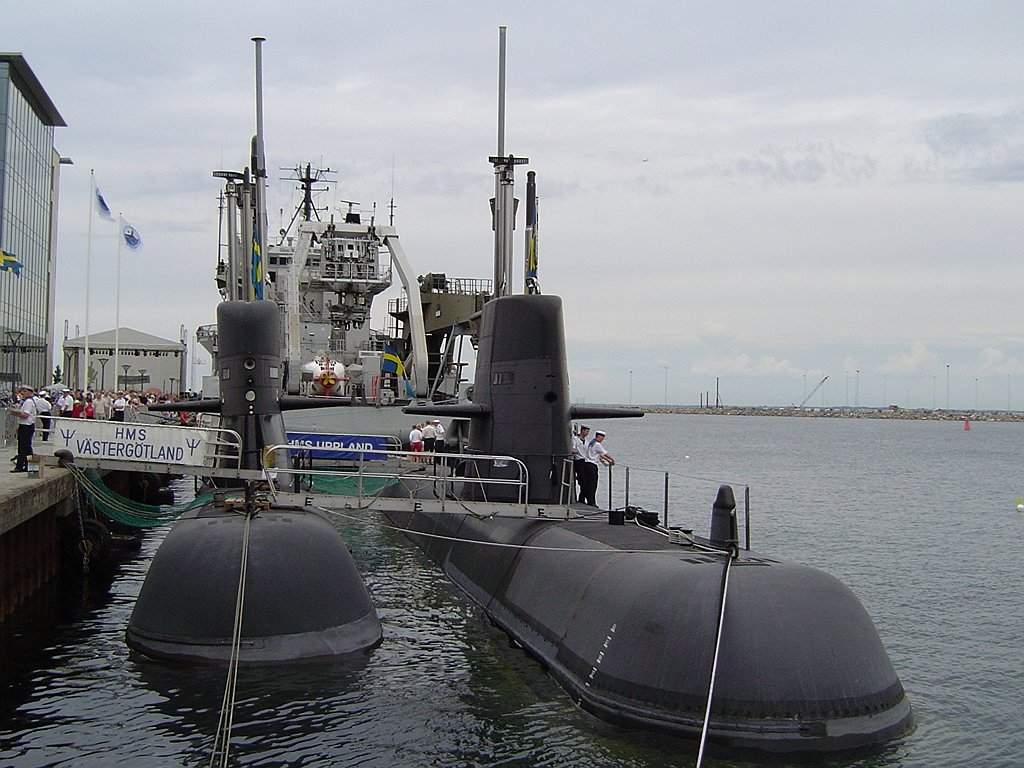
- HSwMS Västergötland (left)

Class overview
- Name: Västergötland class
- Builders: Kockums
- Operators: Swedish Navy; Republic of Singapore Navy
- Preceded by: Näcken class
- Succeeded by: Gotland class
- Subclasses: Södermanland class; Archer class
- Planned: 4
- Completed: 4
- Active: 3
- Retired: 1

General characteristics
- Type: Submarine
- Displacement: Surfaced: 1,070 t (1,050 long tons; 1,180 short tons); Submerged: 1,150 t (1,130 long tons; 1,270 short tons)
- Length: 48.5 m (159 ft 1 in)
- Beam: 6.1 m (20 ft 0 in)
- Draft: 5.6 m (18 ft 4 in)
- Propulsion: 2 × Hedemora V12A/15; 1 × Jeumont-Schneider electric motor
- Speed: Surfaced: 11 kn (20 km/h; 13 mph); Submerged: 20 kn (37 km/h; 23 mph)
- Complement: 18 officers; 6 conscripts
- Sensors & processing systems: FAS
- Armament: 6 × 533mm tubes; 3 × 400mm tubes; Mines

The Västergötland class of diesel-electric submarines entered service in 1987 in the Swedish Navy allowing the last Draken II class of subs to be retired.

== History ==
Following award of the design contract on 17 April 1978 and the construction contract on 8 December 1981 to Kockums AB, building commenced for four boats of the class (Västergötland, Hälsingland, Södermanland, and Östergötland) which were built between 1983 and 1988. The latter two have undergone comprehensive refits, including the insertion of a new hull section with an air-independent propulsion system equipped with Stirling engines. They have been recommissioned in 2003–2004 as the new Södermanland class.

Västergötland and Hälsingland were put in reserve until November 2005, when they were sold to the Republic of Singapore Navy as the Archer class. They were refitted to Södermanland class standards and received additional climatisation for use in tropical waters, and relaunched in 2009–2010.

Östergötland was decommissioned in 2021, leaving Södermanland as the last remaining ship of the class in Swedish service.

== Design ==
The Type A17 attack submarines were designed for the Swedish Navy as replacements for the Draken II-class submarines and incorporates the best properties from the preceding Sjöormen and Näcken classes. Requirements called for a multi-role submarine to carry out a variety of missions involving attack, mining, surveillance, anti-submarine, and interjection of Special Forces. It features a two-deck single-hull design with two watertight compartments divided by a centre watertight bulkhead controlled using an X-configuration rudder/after hydroplane design.

Submarines of the Västergötland class had greater submarine hunting capacity than previous classes, partly due to the fact that they were equipped with a new modern submarine torpedo. The Västergötland class were able to fire up to six heavy and six light wire-guided torpedoes at the same time against different targets, a world record that still stands today.

== Units ==
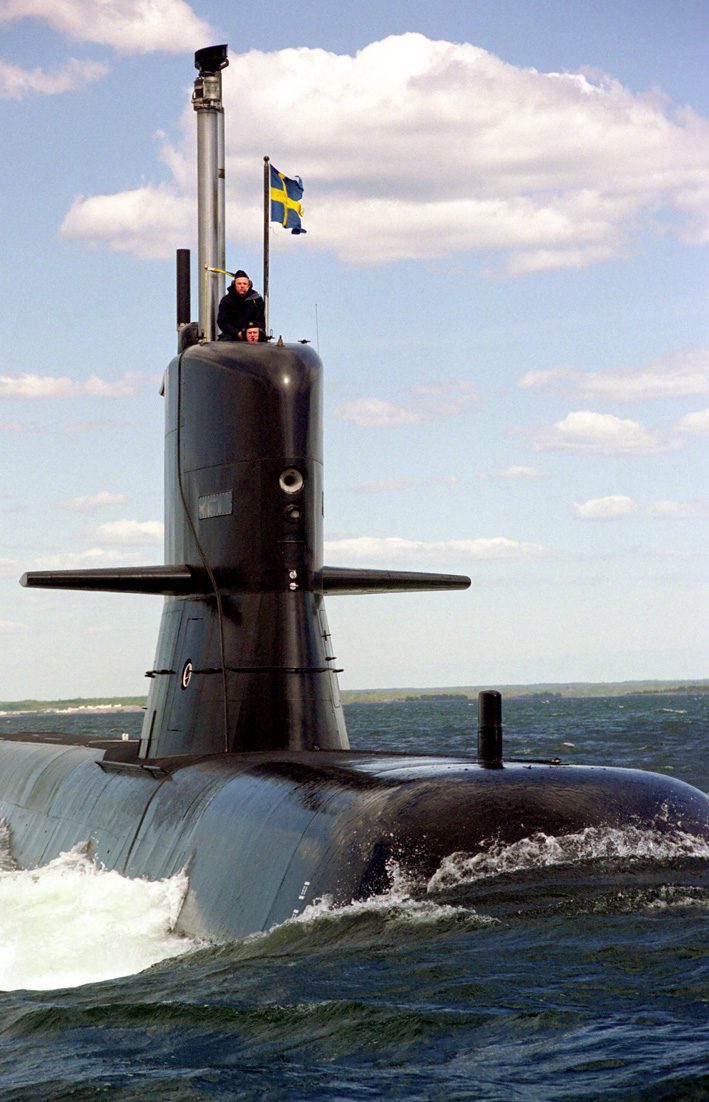
HSwMS Södermanland

Ship name	Laid down	Launched	Commissioned	Service	Refit	Status
Västergötland	10 January 1983	19 July 1986	27 November 1987	1st Submarine flotilla	Sold to Republic of Singapore Navy 2005 (deal finished 2008); Recommissioned as Archer-class submarines	Active
Hälsingland	1 January 1984	31 August 1987	20 October 1988	1st Submarine flotilla	Sold to Republic of Singapore Navy 2005 (deal finished 2008); Recommissioned as Archer-class submarines	Active
Södermanland	1985	12 April 1988	21 April 1989	1st Submarine flotilla	Refitted 2003–2004 to Södermanland class	Active
Östergötland	1986	9 December 1988		1st Submarine flotilla	Refitted 2003–2004 to Södermanland class	Decommissioned 2021; In reserve

== See also ==
- List of submarine classes in service

Equivalent submarines of the same era

- Shishumar class
- Ula class
- Jang Bogo class
