= HSwMS Östergötland (Ögd) =

Swedish submarine

History

Sweden
- Name: HSwMS Östergötland
- Namesake: Swedish province Östergötland
- Ordered: 1980s
- Builder: Kockums
- Launched: 9 December 1988
- Commissioned: 1990, (2007)
- Decommissioned: 2021
- Motto: Securitas orare maritimare ("Coastal Security")
- Nickname(s): Ögd
- Status: In Reserve/Mothballed
- Badge

General characteristics
- Class & type: Västergötland-class submarine; Södermanland-class submarine
- Displacement: 1,400 t (1,378 long tons) surfaced; 1,500 t (1,476 long tons) submerged
- Length: 60.5 m (198 ft 6 in)
- Beam: 6.1 m (20 ft 0 in)
- Propulsion: 2 × Hedemora Diesel generators; 2 × Kockums v4-275R Sterling AIP units
- Speed: 8 knots (15 km/h; 9.2 mph) (Surfaced) 15 knots (28 km/h; 17 mph) (Submerged)
- Complement: 28 officers and enlisted
- Armament: 6 × (533 mm (21 in) torpedo tubes); 3 × (400 mm (16 in) torpedo tubes)

HSwMS Östergötland (Ögd), is a submarine of the Swedish Navy named after Östergötland, Sweden. She is the fourth and last ship of the Västergötland class.

== Development ==
The submarine design combined the best properties from the Sjöormen class and the Näcken class. Submarines of the Västergötland class had greater submarine hunting capacity than previous classes, partly due to the fact that they were equipped with a new modern submarine torpedo. The submarines of the Västergötland class were able to fire up to six heavy and six light wire-guided torpedoes at the same time against different targets.

The Västergötland class included the submarines Södermanland and Östergötland. After significant upgrades, these two submarines were reclassified to a new Södermanland class.

== Service history ==
Between 2000 and 2004, Östergötland and Södermanland underwent extensive modifications, were extended by 12 meters and fitted with air-independent Stirling engines. At the same time, the submarines would be modified to handle international missions with operations in hot and salty waters. The conversion of the two submarines became so extensive that Kockums decided to reclassify the submarines to a new Södermanland class.

Östergötland was decommissioned in 2021.
