= Archer-class sloop =

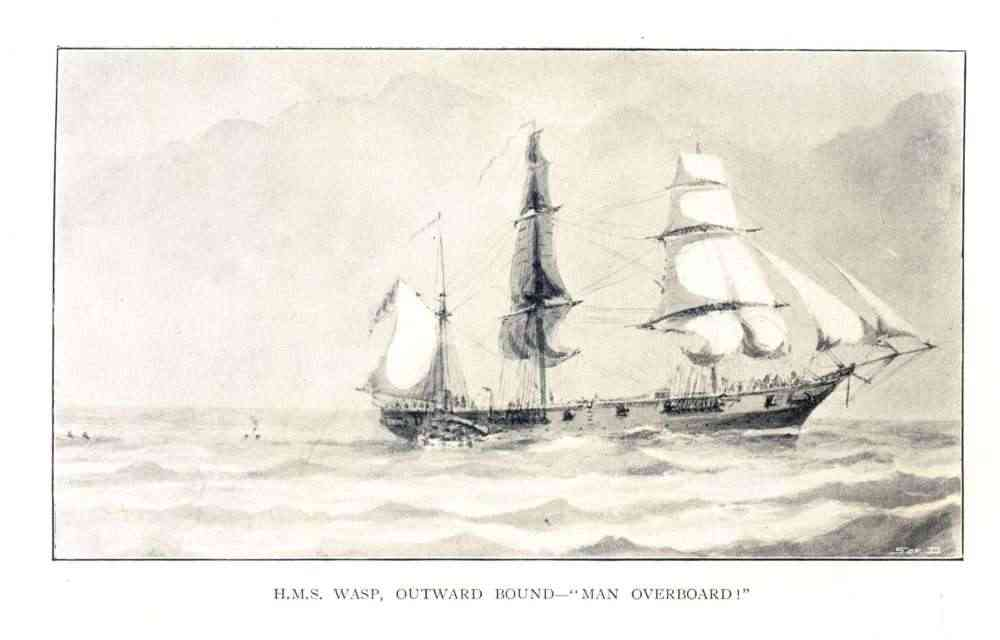
- HMS Wasp in 1860

Class overview
- Name: Archer class
- Builders: Deptford Dockyard
- Operators: Royal Navy
- Preceded by: HMS Reynard
- Succeeded by: HMS Miranda
- Cost: £41,404 (Archer); £33,521 (Wasp)
- Built: 1847—1850
- In service: 1850—1869
- Completed: 2
- Scrapped: 2

General characteristics
- Type: Screw sloop
- Displacement: 1,337 tons
- Tons burthen: 97040/94 bm
- Length: 186 ft 4 in (56.8 m) gundeck; 162 ft 6 1/4 in (49.5 m) keel reported for tonnage
- Beam: 33 ft 10 in (10.3 m) maximum, 33 ft 6 in (10.2 m) reported for tonnage
- Draught: 14 ft 3/4 in (4.3 m) mean
- Depth of hold: 19 ft 0 in (5.8 m)
- Installed power: Archer: 202 nhp, 347 ihp (259 kW); Wasp: 100 nhp, 280 ihp (210 kW)
- Propulsion: Archer: 2-cylinder horizontal geared single-expansion steam engine; Single screw; Wasp: 2-cylinder vertical oscillating single-expansion steam engine; Single screw
- Sail plan: Full-rigged ship
- Complement: 170
- Armament: 2 × 68-pounder (87 cwt) guns; 10 × 32-pounder (42cwt) guns

On 26 March 1846, two vessels were ordered from Deptford Dockyard as Rifleman-designed gunvessels named Archer and Parthian. However, on 9 September 1846 the orders for both vessels were suspended prior to the vessels being laid down. On 25 April 1847 two vessels were ordered to the improved Rattler-type screw sloops as designed by John Edye of the Surveyor's Department from Deptford Dockyard. The first vessel, Archer may have been the change of the build from the Rifleman type to the sloop design. The second vessel, Wasp, appears to be a new vessel as the build for the Parthian remained on the books at Deptford until June 1849, when it was cancelled. Archer received the machinery from the gunvessel Rifleman, which resulted in an increase of speed over Wasp. Wasp's hull was sheathed in Muntz metal to retard marine growth. Their armament would increase from 12 to 15 guns over their careers. Both vessels would participate in the Russian War of 1854–1855 (one in the Baltic Sea, the other in the Black Sea). Both would be broken by 1869.

According to Ships of the Royal Navy, by J.J. College, the original order for Parthian was cancelled in June 1849. This reference does not support the renaming of the vessel under either the Parthian or Wasp entry. British Warships in the Age of Sail (1817 – 1863), by Rif Winfield, states she was renamed to Wasp on 25 August 1847.

Archer was the second named vessel since its introduction for a 12-gun gun brig launched by Perry at Blackwall on 2 April 1801 and sold on 14 December 1815.

Wasp was the seventh named vessel since it was introduced for a 8-gun sloop launched by Portsmouth Dockyard on 4 July 1749, and sold on 4 January 1781.

Parthian was the second named vessel since it was introduced for a 16-gun brig sloop of the Cherokee class, launched by Bernard of Deptford on 13 February 1808 and wrecked off the coast of Egypt on 15 May 1828.

== Construction and specifications ==
Their keels were laid in October 1847 (with Archer being specified as the 18th) at Deptford Dockyard, Archer was launched on 27 March 1849 with Wasp following on 28 May 1850. The gundeck was 186 ft 4 in (56.8 m), with her keel length reported for tonnage calculation of 162 ft 6.75 in (49.5 m). The maximum breadth was 33 feet 10 inches 33 ft 10 in (10.3 m) with 33 ft 6 in (10.2 m) reported for tonnage. She had a depth of hold of 19 ft 0 in (5.8 m). Her builder's measure tonnage was 970 tons with a displacement of 1,337 tons. The draught forward was 14 ft 7 in (4.4 m) and aft 14 ft 10 in (4.5 m) giving a mean draught of 14.75 ft (4.5 m).

The machinery was supplied by Miller, Ravenhill & Company. Both vessels would ship two rectangular fire tube boilers. The horizontal single-expansion (HSE) geared engine installed in Archer had two cylinders of 46.5 in (1,181.1 mm) in diameter with a 36 in (914.4 mm) stroke rated at 202 nominal horsepower (NHP). The engine in Wasp was a vertical single-expansion oscillating type, which had two cylinders of 34 in (863.6 mm) in diameter with a 33 in (838.2 mm) stroke rated at 100 NHP. Both were a single screw.

The armament for both vessels consisted of a pair of Dundas 1853 68-pounder muzzle-loading smoothbore (MLSB) of 87 hundredweight (cwt) 10-foot solid-shot gun on pivot mounts and ten Monk's ‘C’ 1839 32-pounder 42 cwt MLSB 8.5-foot solid-shot guns on broadside trucks.

=== Trials ===
During trials Archer’s engine generated 347 indicated horsepower (259 kW) for a speed of 7.818 knots (14.479 km/h; 8.997 mph). The trial runs for Wasp, her engine generated 280 indicated horsepower (210 kW) for a speed of 8.178 knots (15.146 km/h; 9.411 mph).

Archer was completed for sea on 9 March 1850 at a cost of £41,404 (including hull of £20,785).

Wasp was completed for sea at Woolwich on 26 October 1850 at a cost of £33,521 (including hull of £21,326).

== Ships ==
Name	Ship builder	Launched	Fate
Archer	Deptford Dockyard	27 March 1849	Sold to Castle of Charlton and broken up in March 1866
Wasp	Deptford Dockyard	28 May 1850	Sold to Marshall on 2 December 1869 for breaking at Plymouth
