= Archer-class submarine =

Class of Singaporean submarines

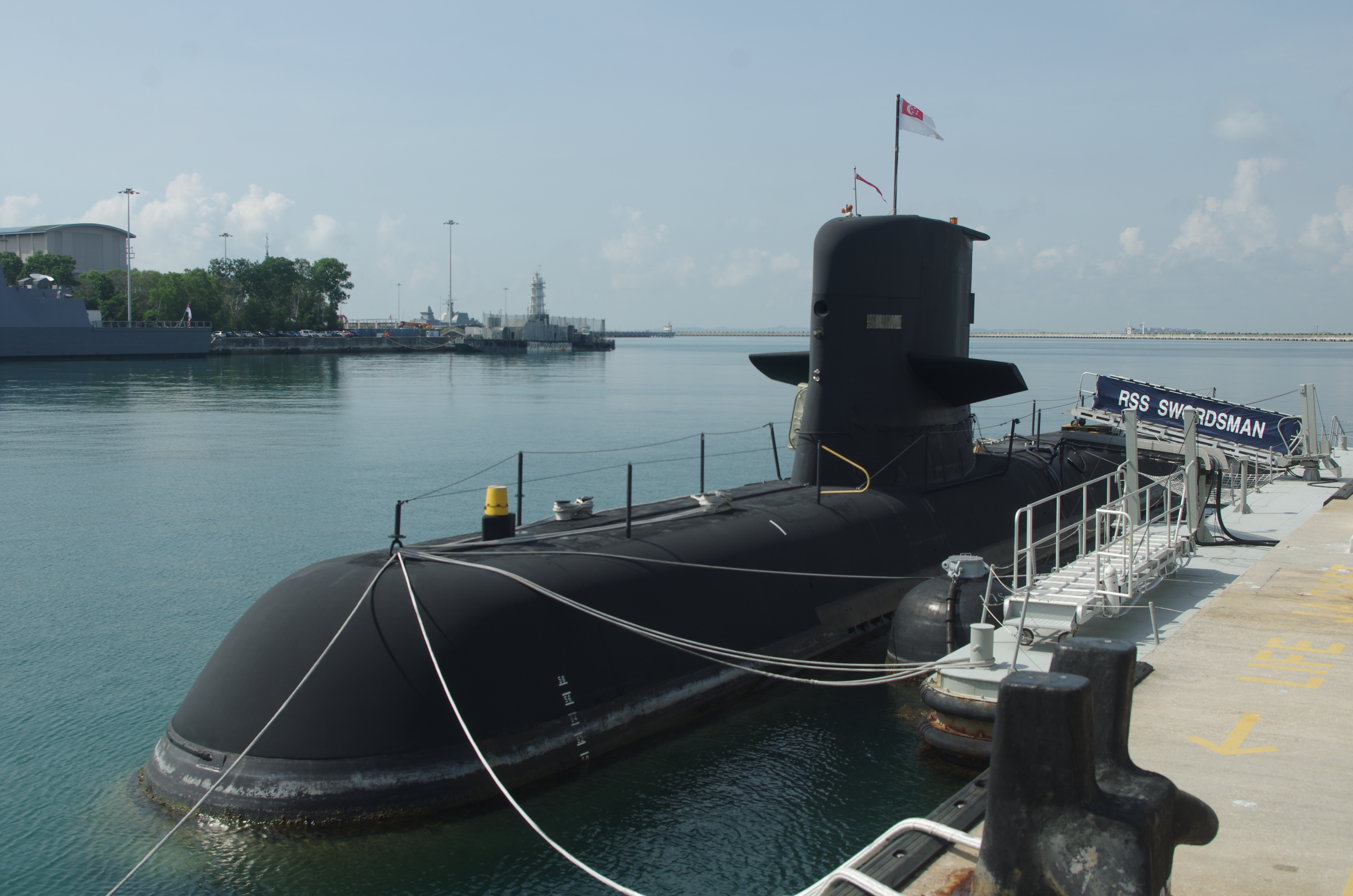
- RSS Swordsman alongside Changi Naval Base

Class overview
- Builders: Kockums
- Operators: Republic of Singapore Navy
- Preceded by: Challenger class
- Succeeded by: Invincible class
- Completed: 2
- Active: 2

General characteristics
- Displacement: Surfaced: 1,400 t (1,400 long tons; 1,500 short tons); Submerged: 1,500 t (1,500 long tons; 1,700 short tons)
- Length: 60.5 m (198 ft 6 in)
- Beam: 6.1 m (20 ft 0 in)
- Draft: 5.6 m (18 ft 4 in)
- Propulsion: 2 × Hedemora diesel-electric engines; 2 × Kockums v4-275R Sterling AIP units
- Speed: Surfaced: 8 kn (15 km/h; 9.2 mph); Submerged: 15 kn (28 km/h; 17 mph)
- Complement: 28
- Sensors & processing systems: FAS
- Armament: 6 × 533 mm (21 in) torpedo tubes for TP-617 heavy-weight torpedoes and Blackshark torpedoes; 3 × 400 mm (16 in) torpedo tubes

The Archer-class submarines are a class of two diesel-electric submarines in active service with the Republic of Singapore Navy (RSN). Originally launched as the Swedish Navy Västergötland-class submarines HSwMS Hälsingland and HSwMS Västergötland in 1986 and 1987, the two submarines were sold to Singapore in November 2005 and relaunched in June 2009 and October 2010 respectively after extensive modernisation by Kockums, which included a refit to Södermanland class standards, the insertion of a new hull section with an air independent propulsion system, and additional climatisation for use in tropical waters.

== History ==
Singapore's Ministry of Defence (MINDEF) signed an agreement with Kockums for the supply of two Archer-class (formerly Västergötland-class) submarines to the RSN on 4 November 2005. More than 20 years old and previously in reserve with the Swedish Navy, the submarines were transferred to the RSN on completion of the modernisation and conversion for operation in tropical waters. RSS Archer was launched on 16 June 2009. RSS Archer underwent sea trials following its launch and is now operational. The second submarine, RSS Swordsman, was launched on 20 October 2010. The Archer-class submarines entered service in 2013 and replaced RSS Challenger and RSS Centurion of the Challenger class that were retired in 2015.

Ship name	Launched	Commissioned	Status
RSS Archer (ex-HSwMS Hälsingland)	16 June 2009	2 December 2011	in active service, as of 2022
RSS Swordsman (ex-HSwMS Västergötland)	20 October 2010	30 April 2013	in active service, as of 2022

== Design and construction ==
The Archer-class submarines were designed and built by Kockums AB as single-hull, double compartment submarines optimised to reduce noise and magnetic signature. The two pressure-tight compartments also enhance safety and survivability of the crew. The submarines were designed to operate in the shallow waters of the Baltic Sea and are therefore also optimised for operation in Singapore waters, which have similar depth profiles. The Archer-class submarines are also equipped with Stirling AIP engines. This enables the submarines to have longer submerged endurance and lower noise signature, enhancing the stealth capability of the submarines. The advanced sonar system allows the submarines to detect contacts at a further distance, while the torpedo system has a better target acquisition capability, which allows the submarines to engage contacts at a longer range.

== See also ==
- List of submarine classes in service
