= Näcken-class submarine =

Swedish Navy submarine class

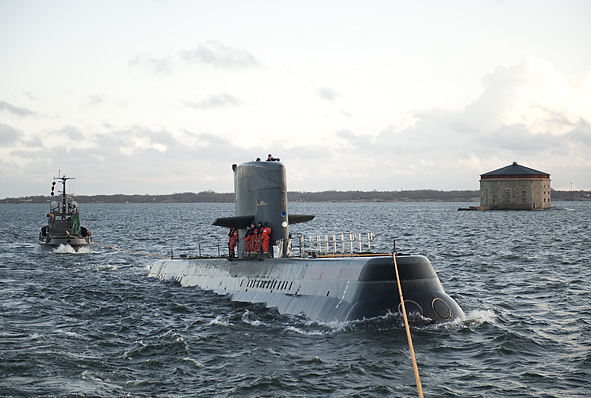
- HSwMS Neptun

Class overview
- Name: Näcken class
- Builders: Kockums
- Operators: Swedish Navy; Royal Danish Navy
- Preceded by: Sjöormen class
- Succeeded by: Västergötland class
- Planned: 3
- Completed: 3
- Scrapped: 2
- Preserved: 1

General characteristics
- Type: Submarine
- Displacement: 1,030 tonnes (1,010 long tons) submerged
- Length: 49.5 m (162 ft 5 in)
- Beam: 5.7 m (18 ft 8 in)
- Draught: 5.5 m (18 ft 1 in)
- Propulsion: 2 × MTU diesel engines; 1 × Jeumont-Schneider electric motor; 1 shaft
- Speed: 20 knots (37 km/h; 23 mph) surfaced; 25 knots (46 km/h; 29 mph) submerged
- Test depth: 150 m (490 ft)
- Complement: 19 (5 officers)
- Sensors & processing systems: FAS
- Armament: 6 × 533 mm (21 in) torpedo tubes; 2 × 400 mm (16 in) torpedo tubes; Mines

The Näcken-class submarines, also known as the A14 type, were built for the Swedish Navy in the late 1970s. The boats were authorised in 1972 and completed between 1980 and 1981. All boats were built by Kockums in Karlskrona. The boats had a teardrop hull and diving depth was 150 metres (490 ft). Between 1987 and 1988, Näcken and her sister ships were cut in half and an 8-metre (26 ft) long hull section containing a prototype Air-independent propulsion (AIP) using a closed cycle Stirling engine was installed between the aft battery/propulsion & power control room and the engine/motor room. This technology increased underwater endurance to 14 days and has been adopted in subsequent Swedish submarines.

By the early 2000s the class was decommissioned from the Swedish navy as a result of defence cuts in the year 2000 Defence White Paper. HSwMS Näcken was temporary leased to the Royal Danish Navy but was returned in 2005.

== Boats ==
Ship	Launched	Commissioned	Current status
Näcken	17 April 1978	25 April 1980	leased to the Royal Danish Navy 2001-2005 as Kronborg, scrapped in 2016
Neptun	6 December 1978	5 December 1980	on display at Marinmuseum Karlskrona
Najad	13 August 1979	26 June 1981	Scrapped in 2015

== See also ==
Equivalent submarines of the same era

- Sava class
- Sauro class
- Agosta class
- Type 209
