= Hedemora Diesel =

Hedemora Diesel is a trademark for the Swedish company Hedemora Turbo & Diesel AB in Hedemora, Dalarna County, Sweden. It is a spinoff from Hedemora Verkstäder. The company used to produce diesel engines for ships, locomotives, and oil rigs along with backup generators for hospitals. The company later shifted its focus to supplying existing engines with spare parts and services.

In February 2006, Hedemora Diesel was bought by the Australian company Coote Industrial Ltd.

In February 2016, the company name was changed to Hedemora Turbo & Diesel, to include the manufacturing, design authority, parts and service supply of HS Turbochargers, that were acquired from Turbomeca in 2009.

== Ships with Hedemora engines ==
- Submarines in Sjöormen class submarine
  - HSwMS Sjöormen (Sor)
  - HSwMS Sjölejonet (Sle)
  - HSwMS Sjöhunden (Shu)
  - HSwMS Sjöbjörnen (Sbj)
  - HSwMS Sjöhästen (Shä)
- Submarines in Västergötlands-/Södermanland class submarine
  - HSwMS Västergötland (Vgd)
  - HSwMS Hälsingland (Hgd)
  - HSwMS Södermanland (Söd)
  - HSwMS Östergötland (Ögd)
- HSwMS Orion (A201)
- HSwMS Utö (A261)
- Royal Australian Navy's Collins class submarine
  - HMAS Collins (SSG 73)
  - HMAS Farncomb (SSG 74)
  - HMAS Waller (SSG 75)
  - HMAS Dechaineux (SSG 76)
  - HMAS Sheean (SSG 77)
  - HMAS Rankin (SSG 78)

== Locomotives with Hedemora engines ==
- T45 – Diesel locomotive, built by ASEA. 5 st.
- Experimental locomotive built by AB Motala Verkstad for LKAB mine train
- Some replacement engines of TCDD DE24000

== Oil rigs with Hedemora engines ==
- Eldfisk Tor (Phillips Petroleum)

Northern Producer semi-submersible operated by Enquest.
