= HSwMS Sjölejonet =

Several ships of the Swedish Navy have been named HSwMS Sjölejonet, named after the sea lion:

- HSwMS Sjölejonet (1936) was a Sjölejonet-class submarine launched in 1936
- HSwMS Sjölejonet (1967) was a Sjöormen-class submarine launched in 1967 and sold to Singapore in the 1990s
