= HSwMS Sjöormen =

Several ships of the Swedish Navy have been named HSwMS Sjöormen, named after the sea serpent:

- HSwMS Sjöormen (1941) was a Sjölejonet-class submarine launched in 1941
- HSwMS Sjöormen (Sor) was a Sjöormen-class submarine launched in 1967 and sold to Singapore in 1997
