= HSwMS Sjöhästen =

Two warships of Sweden have been named Sjöhästen, after Sjöhästen:

- HSwMS Sjöhästen (1940), a Sjölejonet-class submarine launched in 1940 and stricken in 1963.
- HSwMS Sjöhästen (1968), a Sjöormen-class submarine launched in 1968 and sold to Singapore in 1997.
