= HSwMS Sjöhunden =

Two warships of Sweden have been named Sjöhunden, after Sjöhunden:

- HSwMS Sjöhunden (1938), a Sjölejonet-class submarine launched in 1938 and stricken in 1960.
- HSwMS Sjöhunden (1968), a Sjöormen-class submarine launched in 1968 and sold to Singapore in 1997.
