= HSwMS Sjöbjörnen =

Two warships of Sweden have been named Sjöbjörnen, after Sjöbjörnen:

- HSwMS Sjöbjörnen (1938), a Sjölejonet-class submarine launched in 1938 and stricken in 1964.
- HSwMS Sjöbjörnen (1968), a Sjöormen-class submarine launched in 1968 and sold to Singapore in 1997.
