= Challenger-class submarine =

Republic of Singapore Navy class (1997–2024)

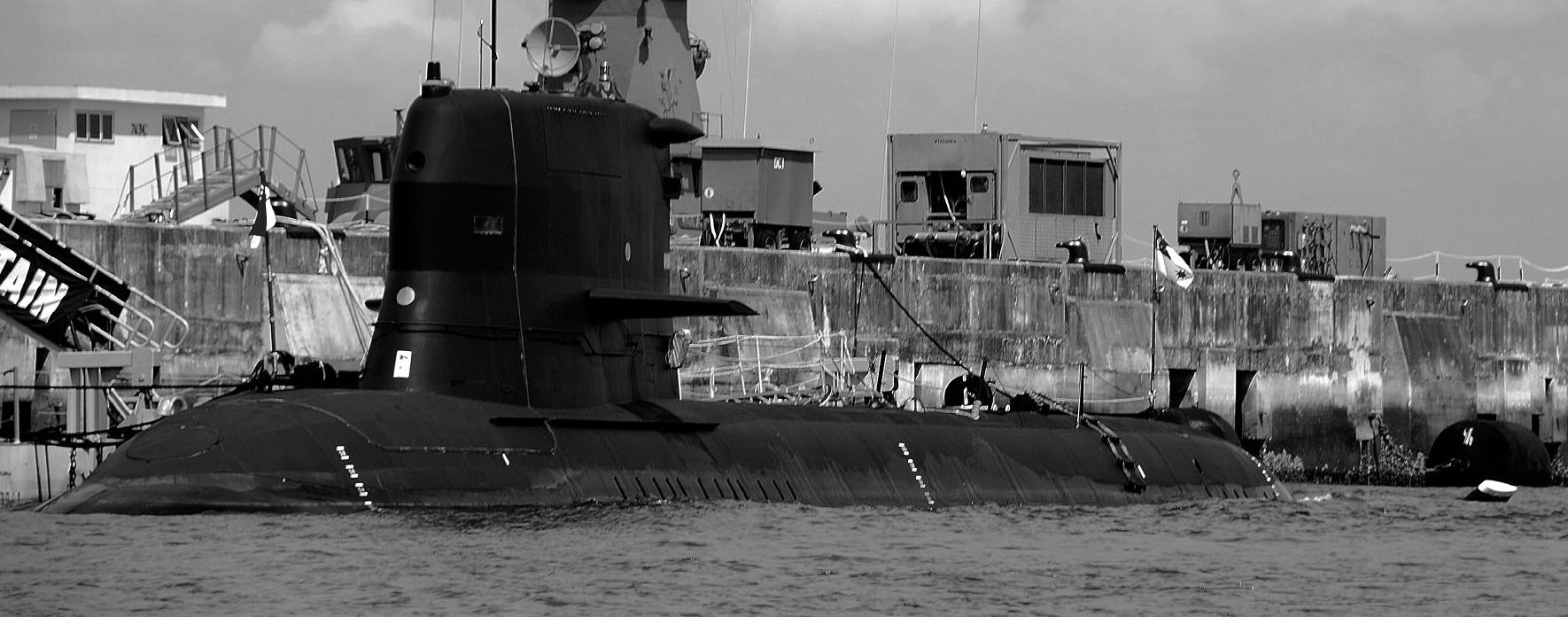
- RSS Chieftain

Class overview
- Builders: Kockums
- Operators: Republic of Singapore Navy
- Succeeded by: Archer class
- Completed: 4
- Active: 0
- Retired: 4

General characteristics
- Type: Diesel-electric Attack submarine
- Displacement: Surfaced: 1,125 t (1,107 long tons; 1,240 short tons); Submerged: 1,400 t (1,400 long tons; 1,500 short tons)
- Length: 50 m (164 ft 1 in)
- Beam: 6.1 m (20 ft 0 in)
- Draught: 5.1 m (16 ft 9 in)
- Propulsion: 1 shaft 2 × Pielstick diesel; 1 × ASEA electric motor
- Speed: Surfaced: 15 kn (28 km/h; 17 mph); Submerged: 20 kn (37 km/h; 23 mph)
- Complement: 23
- Sensors & processing systems: FAS
- Armament: 4 × 533 mm (21 in) torpedo tubes; 2 × 400 mm (16 in) torpedo tubes

The Challenger class was one of the submarine classes of the Republic of Singapore Navy (RSN). They were extensively modernised versions of the former Sjöormen-class submarines. Challenger and Centurion were retired in 2015, while Conqueror and Chieftain were retired in 2024.

== History ==
In 1995, the RSN acquired a refurbished Sjöormen-class submarine from the Swedish Navy, followed by another three in 1997. It is believed that the Challenger class were purchased to develop the required submarine operations expertise before selecting a modern class of submarines to replace them, as all the boats were over 50 years old.

Ship Name	Launched	Commissioned	Status
RSS Challenger (ex-HSwMS Sjöbjörnen)	26 September 1997	2000s	retired on 11 March 2015
RSS Conqueror (ex-HSwMS Sjölejonet)	28 May 1999	22 July 2001	retired on 25 November 2024
RSS Centurion (ex-HSwMS Sjöormen)	28 May 1999	26 June 2004	retired on 11 March 2015
RSS Chieftain (ex-HSwMS Sjöhunden)	22 May 2001	24 August 2002	retired on 25 November 2024

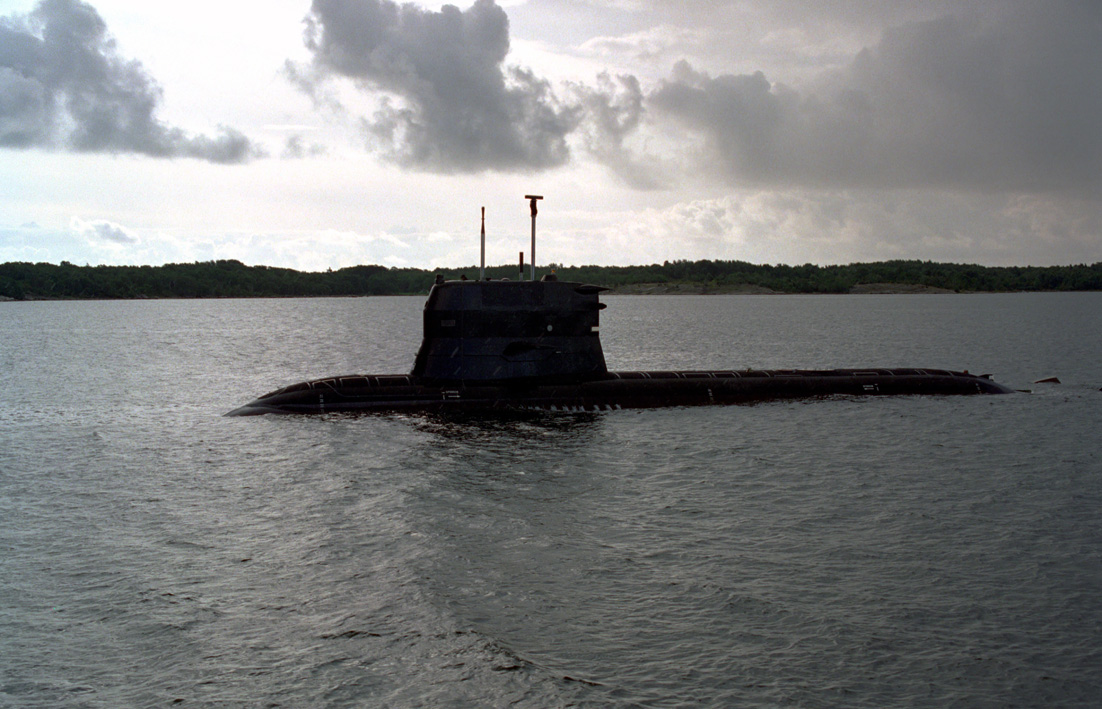
RSS Challenger undergoing sea trials

== Modernisation ==
The Challenger-class submarines had undergone the Riken modernisation programme tailored to the specific operational conditions of the Singapore Navy. As the submarines were designed by the Swedish for operations in the Baltic Sea, various modifications were required to suit them to tropical waters. A comprehensive tropicalisation programme was carried out for all four submarines, which involved installing air conditioning, marine growth protection systems and corrosion-resistant piping.

== See also ==
- List of submarine classes in service

== Bibliography ==
- Conway's All the World's Fighting Ships 1947-1995
