= HSwMS Sjölejonet (1936) =

1936 Swedish submarine

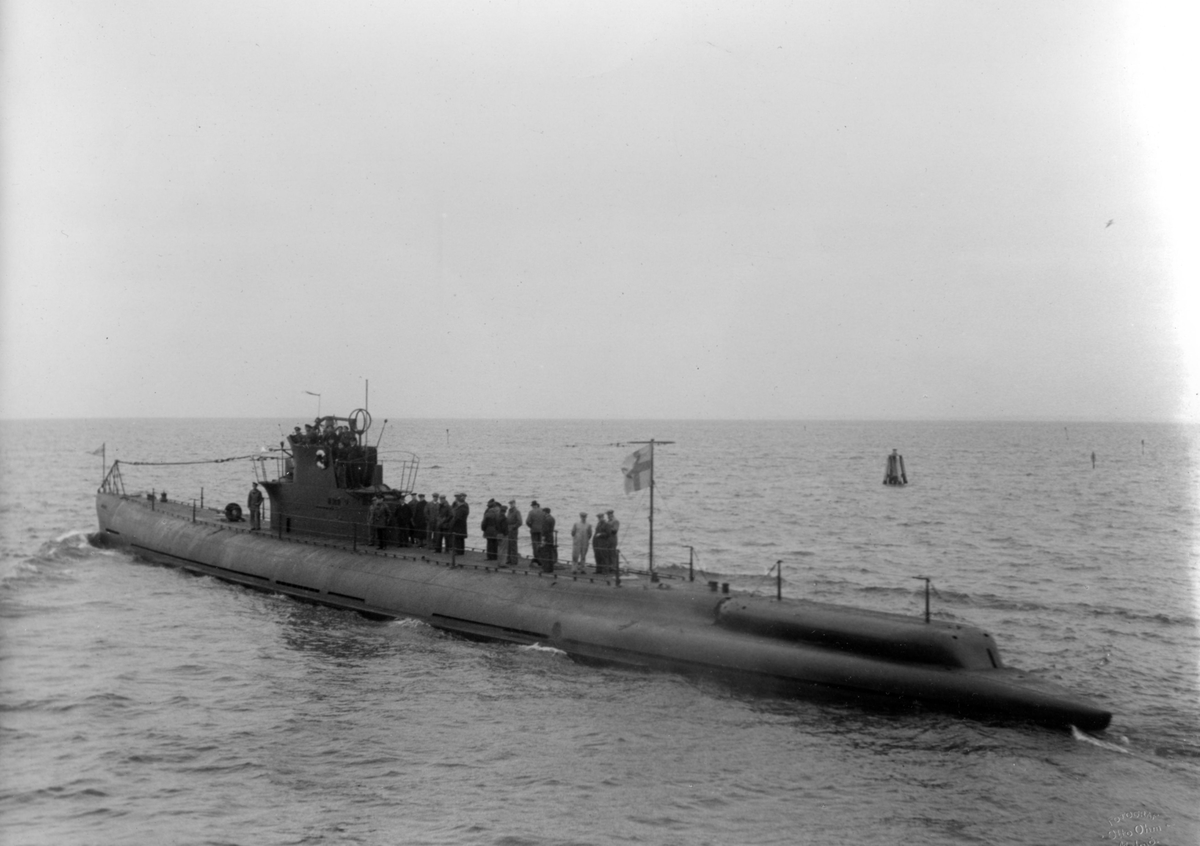

History

Sweden
- Name: Sjölejonet
- Builder: Kockums MV A/B, Malmö
- Laid down: 1935
- Launched: 25 July 1936
- Commissioned: 21 August 1938
- Fate: Stricken 15 May 1959

General characteristics as built
- Class & type: Sjölejonet-class submarine
- Displacement: 590 t (580 long tons) standard; 770 t (760 long tons) submerged
- Length: 64.2 m (210 ft 8 in)
- Beam: 6.4 m (21 ft 0 in)
- Draught: 3.4 m (11 ft 2 in)
- Propulsion: 2 × MAN diesel engines, 1,600 kW (2,100 bhp); 2 × electric motors, 750 kW (1,000 hp); 2 propellers
- Speed: 16.2 knots (30.0 km/h; 18.6 mph) surfaced; 10 knots (19 km/h; 12 mph) submerged
- Complement: 38
- Armament: 6 × 533 mm (21 in) torpedo tubes; 2 × 40 mm (1.6 in) guns

HSwMS Sjölejonet was the lead ship of a class of nine naval submarines in the service of the Swedish Navy from just before World War II into the early Cold War. The submarines were ordered in response to the rising German threat to the south in the interwar period. Sjölejonet remained in service until 1959 and was sold for scrap in 1962.

== Background ==
After 1930 the rise of the German threat to the south produced more investment in Sweden's military. The Swedish Navy was given more funds and new submarine designs were ordered. Sjölejonet was the lead ship of her class of submarines.

== Design ==
The vessel measured 64.2 metres (210 ft 8 in) long with a beam of 6.4 m (21 ft 0 in) and a draught of 3.4 m (11 ft 2 in). Sjölejonet had a standard displacement of 590 tonnes (580 long tons) and 770 t (760 long tons) submerged. The vessel was propelled by two propellers powered by two MAN diesel engines when surfaced creating 1,600 kW (2,100 bhp) and two electric motors when submerged rated at 750 kW (1,000 hp). This gave the submarine a maximum speed of 16.2 knots (30.0 km/h; 18.6 mph) surfaced and 10 knots (19 km/h; 12 mph) submerged. The submarine had a crew of 38. Sjölejonet was armed with six 533 mm (21 in) torpedo tubes, three of which were situated in the bow, one in the stern and the remaining two in a single traversing deck mounting. For anti-aircraft defence, the submarines had two 40 mm (1.6 in) guns in disappearing mounts.

== Construction and career ==
Constructed by Kockums MV A/Bat their shipyard in Malmö, Sweden, Sjölejonet's keel was laid down in 1935. The submarine was launched on 25 July 1936 and was commissioned on 21 August 1938. In the 1950s, Sjölejonet underwent a major refit where the guns and deck torpedo tubes were removed and the conning tower was streamlined. The submarine's displacements remained the same, now 660 tonnes (650 long tons) surfaced and the diesels capable of 2,200 kW (3,000 bhp) and electric motors 1,500 kW (2,000 hp), but only a maximum speed of 15 knots (28 km/h; 17 mph) surfaced. The number of crew was reduced to 32. (Note: Blackman states the 40 mm guns were retained.) The submarine remained in service until stricken on 15 May 1959. The vessel was sold for scrap in 1962.
