= HSwMS Sjöbjörnen (1968) =

Swedish submarine, launched 1968

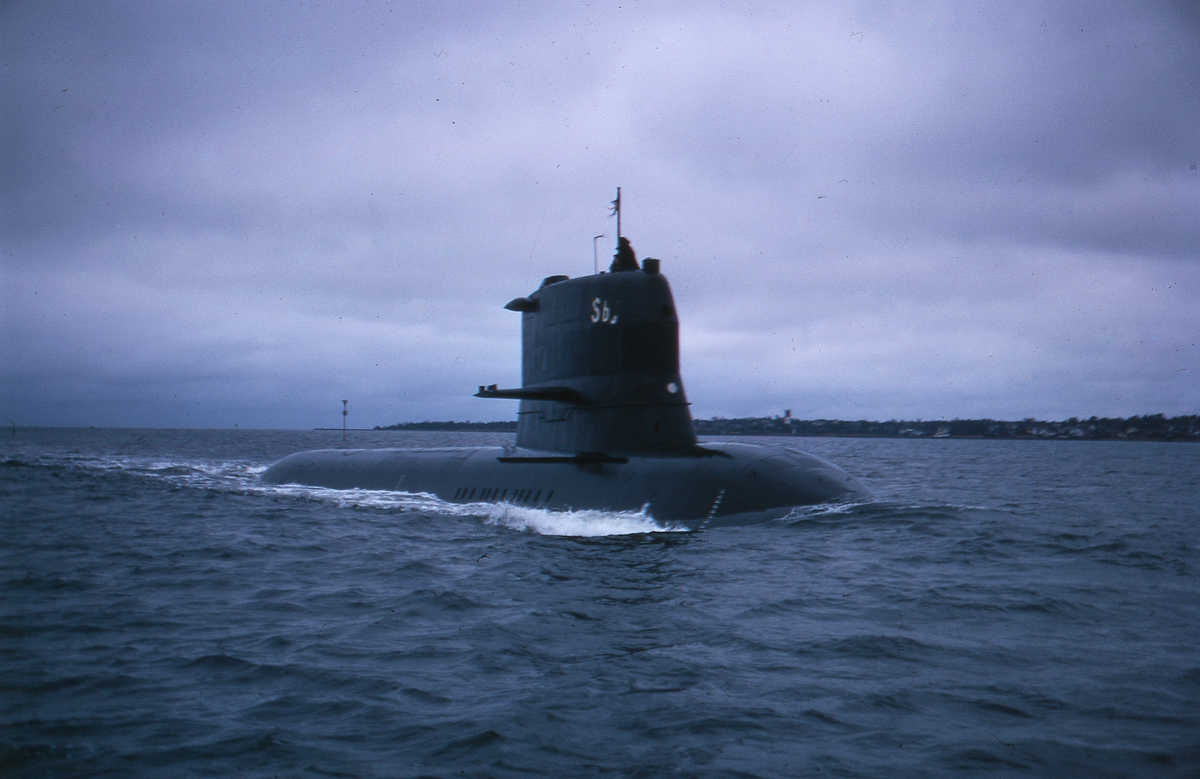
- HSwMS Sjöbjörnen underway between 1970-1989.

History

Sweden
- Name: Sjöbjörnen
- Namesake: Sjöbjörnen
- Ordered: 1966
- Builder: Karlskrona naval base
- Launched: 9 January 1968
- Commissioned: 28 February 1969
- Decommissioned: 1997
- Motto: Nulli secundus; (Second to none)
- Nickname(s): Sbj
- Fate: Sold to Singapore in 1997

Singapore
- Name: Challenger
- Namesake: Challenger
- Acquired: 28 May 1999
- Commissioned: 2000s
- Decommissioned: 11 March 2015
- Home port: Changi
- Fate: Scrapped

General characteristics
- Class & type: Sjöormen-class submarine; Challenger-class submarine
- Displacement: 1,130 t (1,112 long tons) surfaced; 1,210 t (1,191 long tons) submerged
- Length: 50.5 m (165 ft 8 in)
- Beam: 6.1 m (20 ft 0 in)
- Draught: 5.8 m (19 ft 0 in)
- Propulsion: 2 × Hedemora diesel generators; 1 × electric motor; 1 shaft
- Speed: 20 knots (37 km/h; 23 mph)
- Complement: 25 officers and enlisted
- Armament: 4 × 533 mm (21 in) torpedo tubes; 2 × 400 mm (16 in) torpedo tubes

HSwMS Sjöbjörnen (Sbj), Sw. meaning sea bear, was the third ship of the Swedish submarine class Sjöormen, project name A11.

== Development ==
The planning of the class included a number of different AIP solutions including nuclear propulsion. However, the ships where finally completed with for the time extremely large batteries. The ship was a single-hulled submarine, with the hull shape influenced by the American experimental submarine USS Albacore. The hull was covered with rubber tiles to reduce the acoustic signature (anechoic tiles), at this time a pioneering technology. The Sjöormen class also pioneered the use of an x-shaped (as opposed to cross-shaped) rudder as a standard (as opposed to experimental) feature.

== Service in Sweden ==
The submarine served in the Swedish Navy for almost 30 years and was then sold to Singapore in 1997 together with its four sister ships.

== Service in Singapore ==
HSwMS Sjöbjörnen was renamed RSS Challenger after Singapore acquired the boat on 28 May 1999. She was commissioned on 26 June 2004 after a major refit. After 11 years in the Republic of Singapore Navy, she was decommissioned on 11 March 2015 and scrapped.

== Gallery ==
HSwMS Sjöbjörnen & RSS Challenger gallery

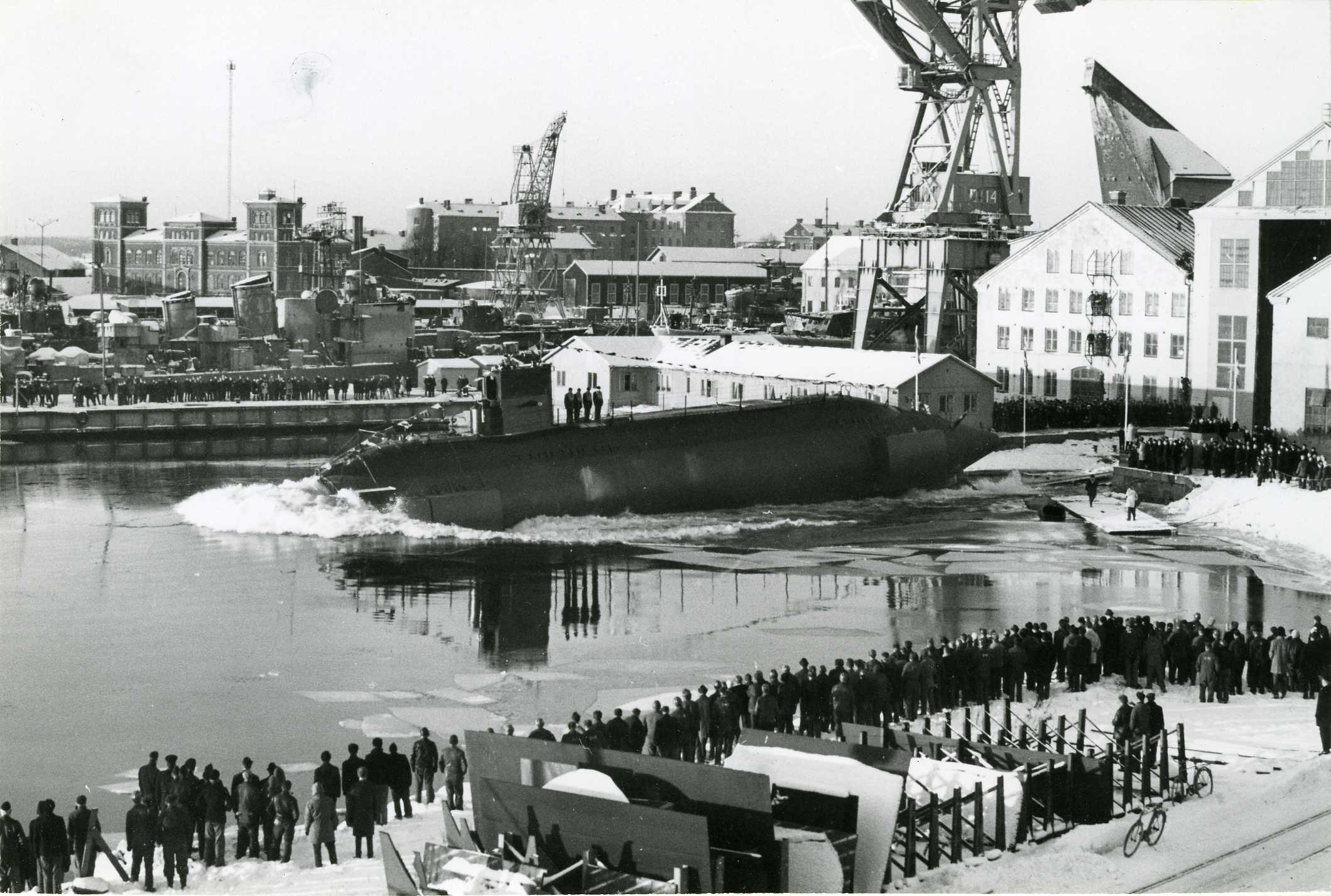
HSwMS Sjöbjörnen being launched on 9 January 1968.

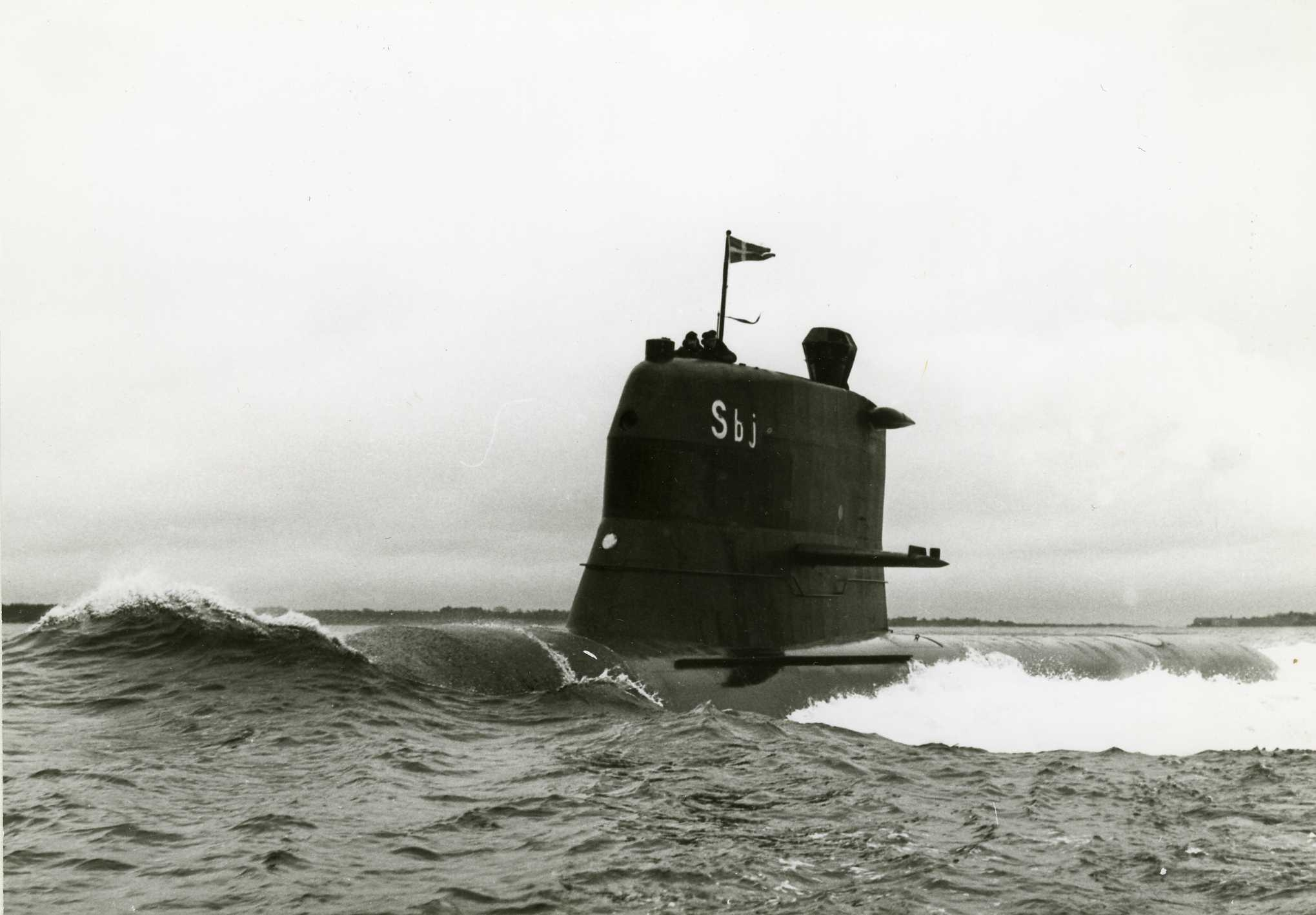
HSwMS Sjöbjörnen surfacing in 1968.

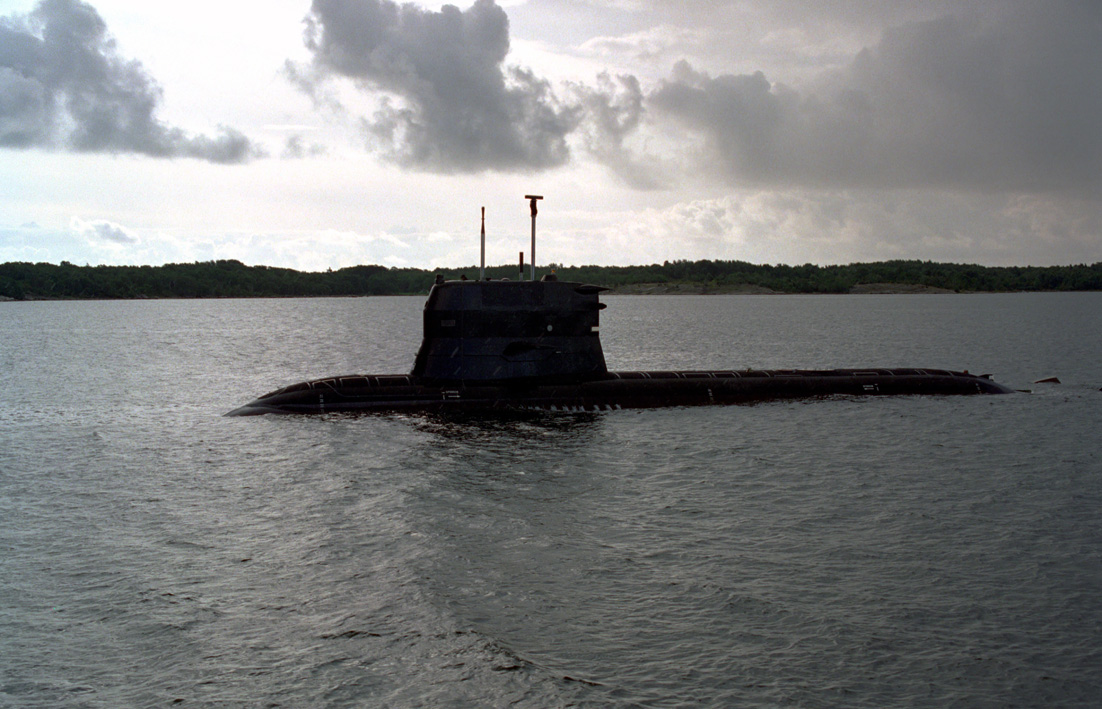
RSS Challenger undergoing session trials on 23 March 2010.
