= HSwMS Sjöhästen (1968) =

Swedish ship

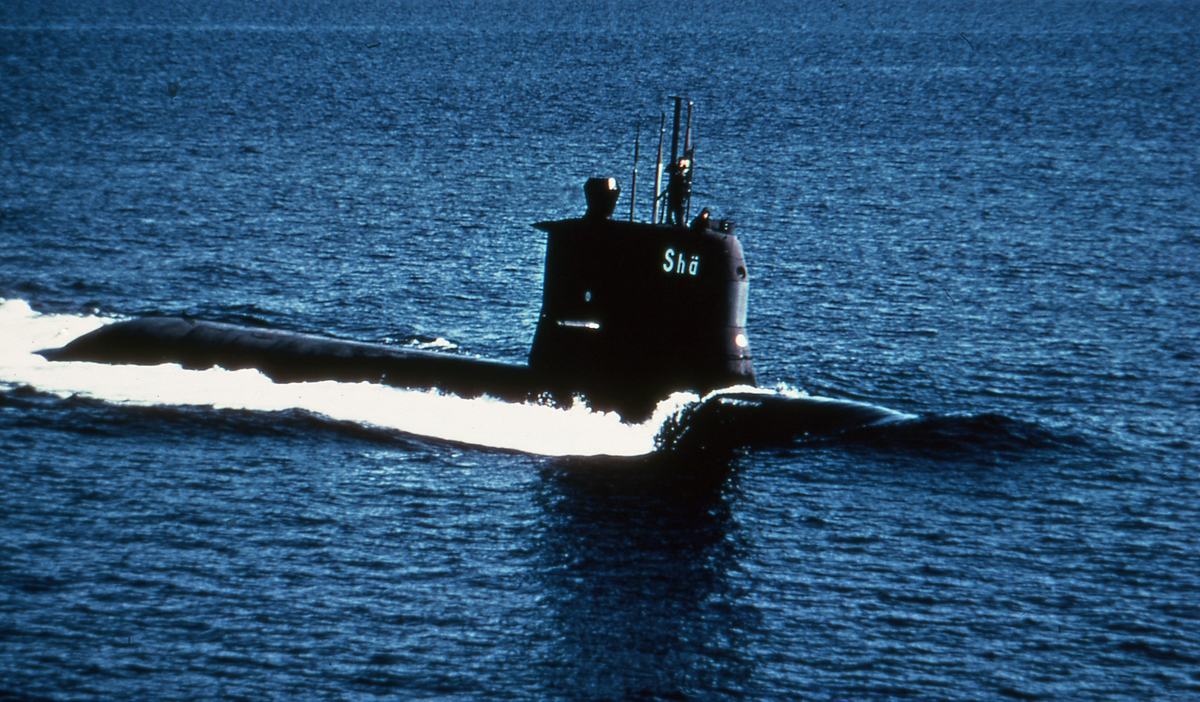
- HSwMS Sjöhästen underway, date unknown.

History

Sweden
- Name: Sjöhästen
- Namesake: Sjöhästen
- Ordered: 1966
- Builder: Karlskrona naval base
- Launched: 6 August 1968
- Commissioned: 19 May 1969
- Decommissioned: 1997
- Motto: Mares pegasus
- Nickname(s): Shä
- Fate: Sold to Singapore in 1997

Singapore
- Acquired: 28 May 1999
- Home port: Changi Naval Base, Singapore
- Fate: Scrapped, used for spare parts

General characteristics
- Class & type: Sjöormen-class submarine
- Displacement: 1,130 t (1,112 long tons) surfaced; 1,210 t (1,191 long tons) submerged
- Length: 50.5 m (165 ft 8 in)
- Beam: 6.1 m (20 ft 0 in)
- Draught: 5.8 m (19 ft 0 in)
- Propulsion: 2 × Hedemora Diesel generators; 1 × electric motor; 1 shaft
- Speed: 20 knots (37 km/h; 23 mph)
- Complement: 25 officers and enlisted
- Armament: 4 × (533 mm (21 in) torpedo tubes); 2 × (400 mm (16 in) torpedo tubes)

HSwMS Sjöhästen (Shä), Sw. meaning sea horse, was the fifth and last ship of the Swedish submarine class Sjöormen, project name A11.

== Development ==
The planning of the class included a number of different AIP-solutions including nuclear propulsion, however the ships where finally completed with for the time extremely large batteries. The ship was a single-hulled submarine, with hull shape influenced by the American experimental submarine USS Albacore. The hull was covered with rubber tiles to reduce the acoustic signature (anechoic tiles), at this time a pioneer technology. The Sjöormen class also pioneered the use of an x-shaped (as opposed to cross-shaped) rudder as a standard (as opposed to experimental) feature.

== Service in Sweden ==
Sjöhästen was launched on 6 August 1968 at Karlskronavarvet in Karlskrona, Sweden. County Governor Thure Andersson performed the christening, but numerous military and civilian honoratiores did not get to see any submarine leave the slipway. The water level was 30 cm below the average surface. In addition to County Governor Thure Andersson and his wife, among those present was the "Swedish-American of the Year" Admiral Arleigh Burke and his wife who made a detour to Karlskrona before continuing to Sofiero Palace to be received by King Gustaf VI Adolf. Among the guests were First Marshal of the Court Admiral Stig H:son Ericson, director (departementsråd) Benkt Dahlberg of the Ministry of Defence, the Chief of the Defence Staff Lieutenant General Stig Synnergren, and Sten Wåhlin, the director general of the Swedish Defence Materiel Administration. Kockums was represented by directors Nils Haldenborg, director Per Stenberg and director Karl-Gustaf Råwall.

The submarine served in the Swedish Navy for almost 30 years and was then sold to Singapore in 1997 together with its four sister ships.

== Service in Singapore ==
Sjöhästen was sold to Singapore on 28 May 1999. Unlike her four sister ships, she was never commissioned, instead being used for spare parts before her dismantling in the 2000s.

== Gallery ==
HSwMS Sjöhästen Gallery

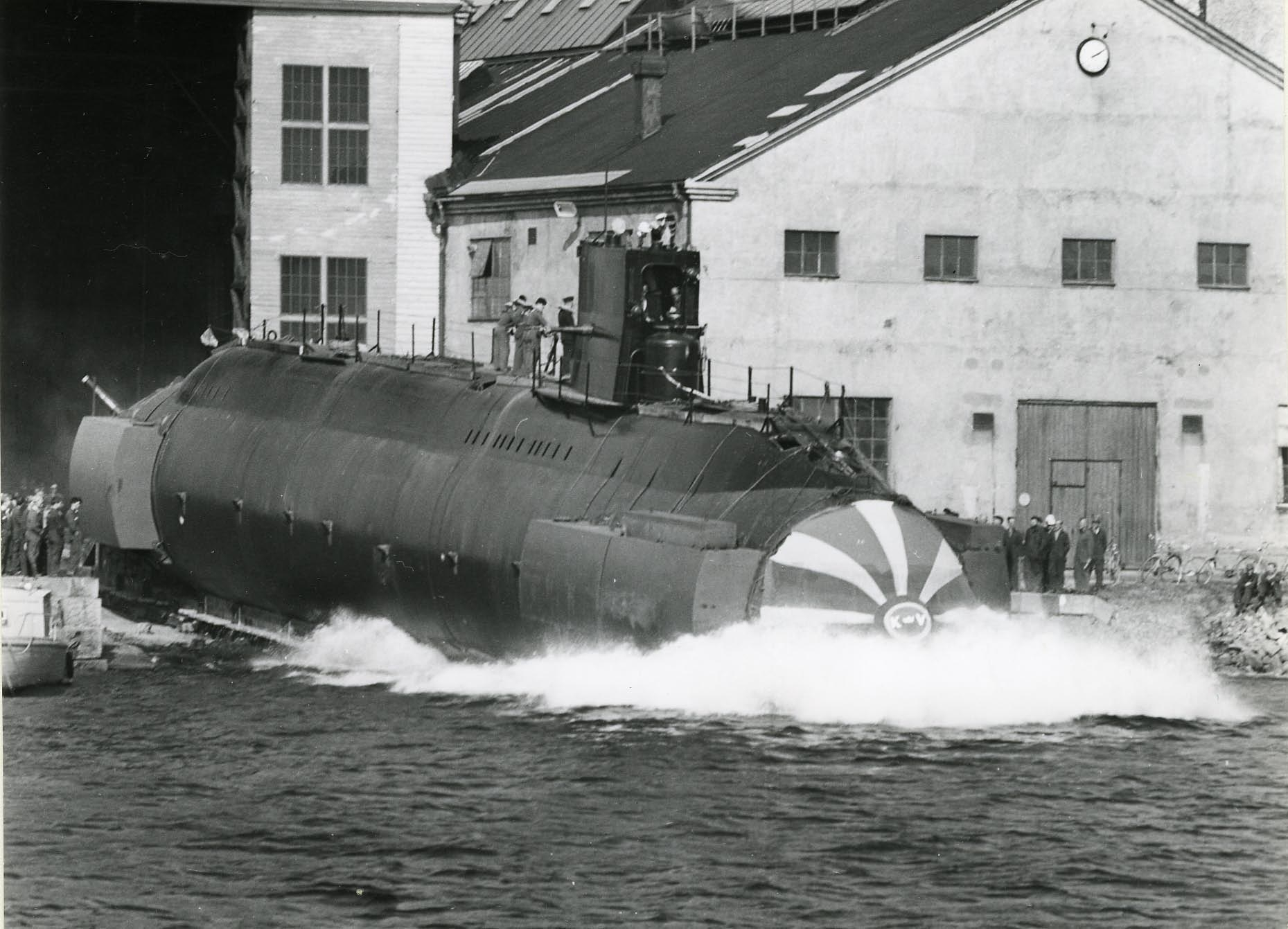
HSwMS Sjöhästen being launched on 6 August 1968.

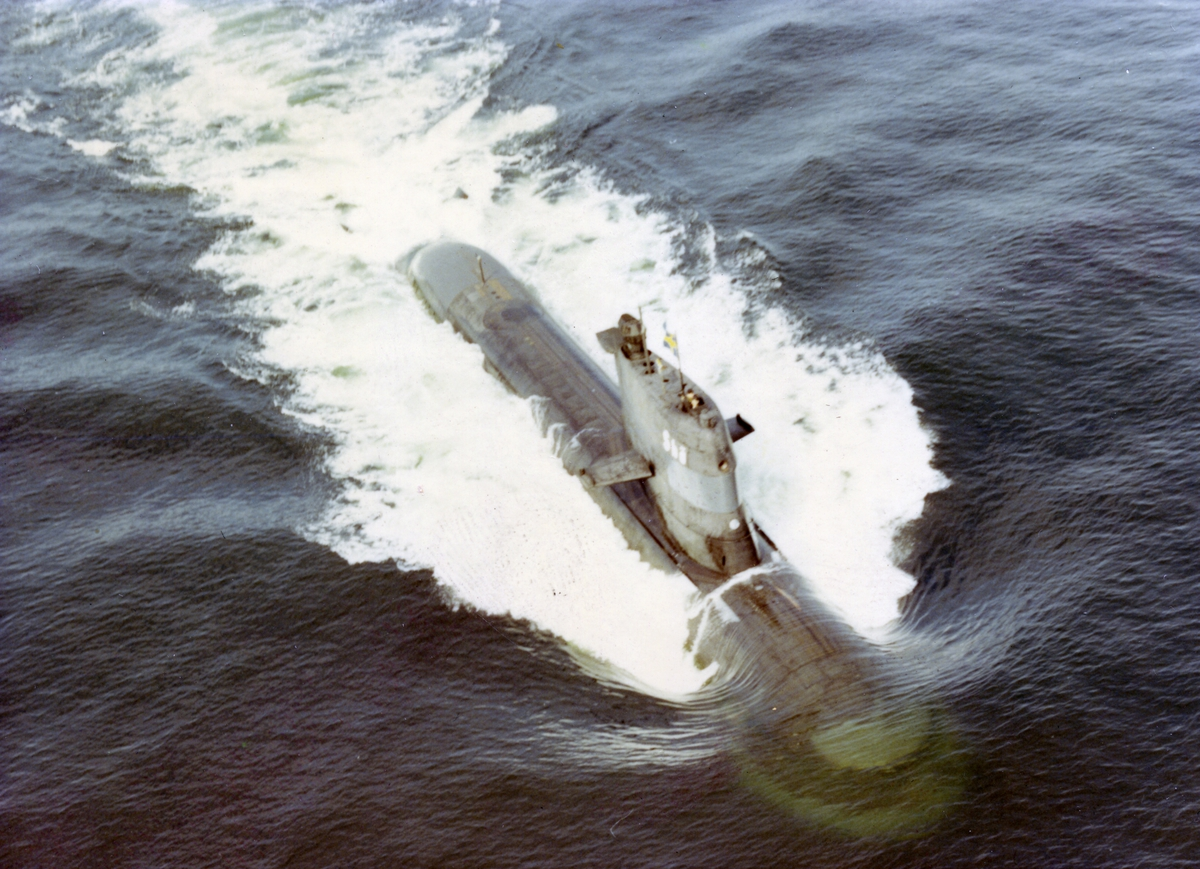
HSwMS Sjöhästen underway between 1967 and 1968.

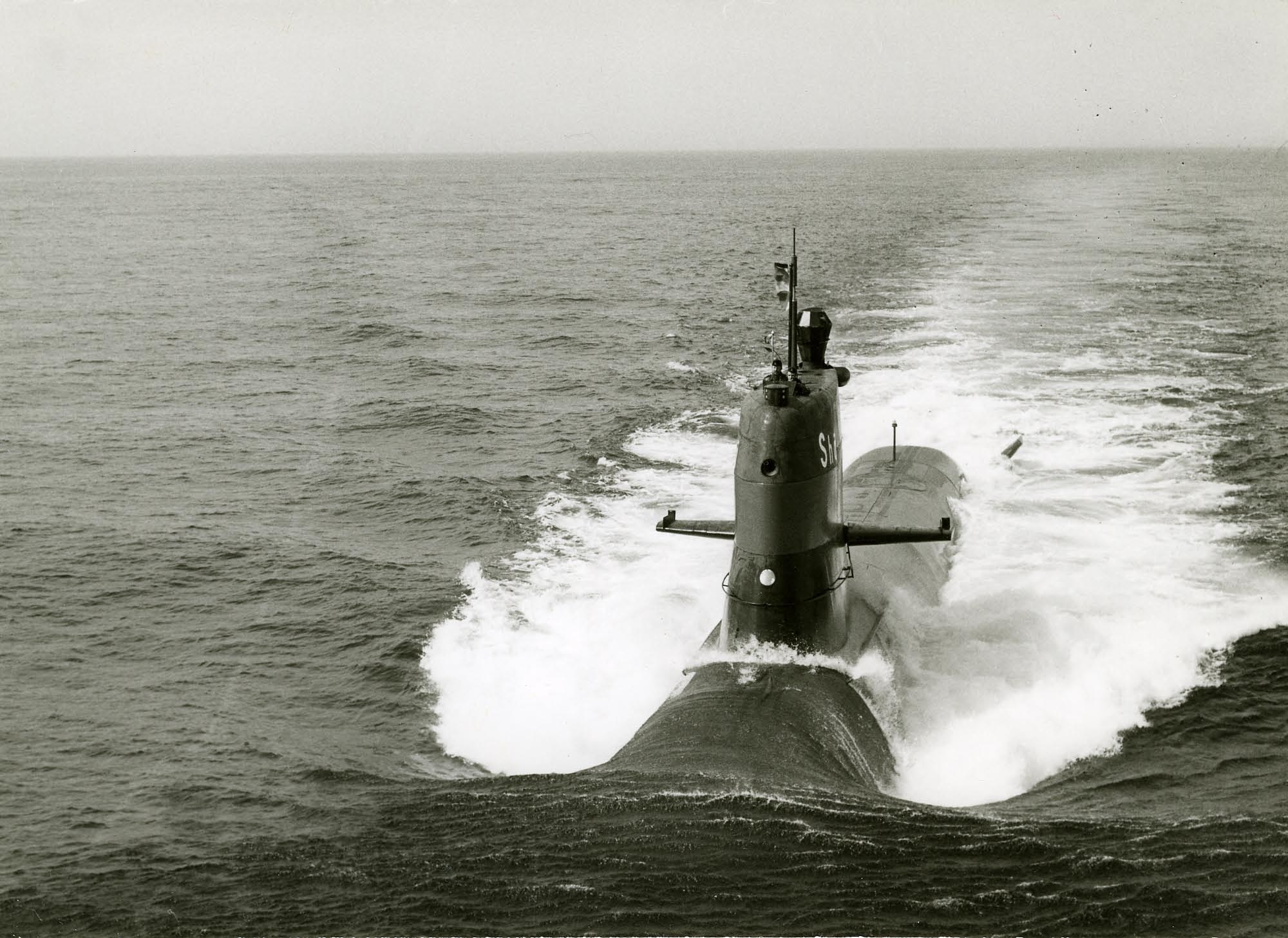
HSwMS Sjöhästen underway in 1968.

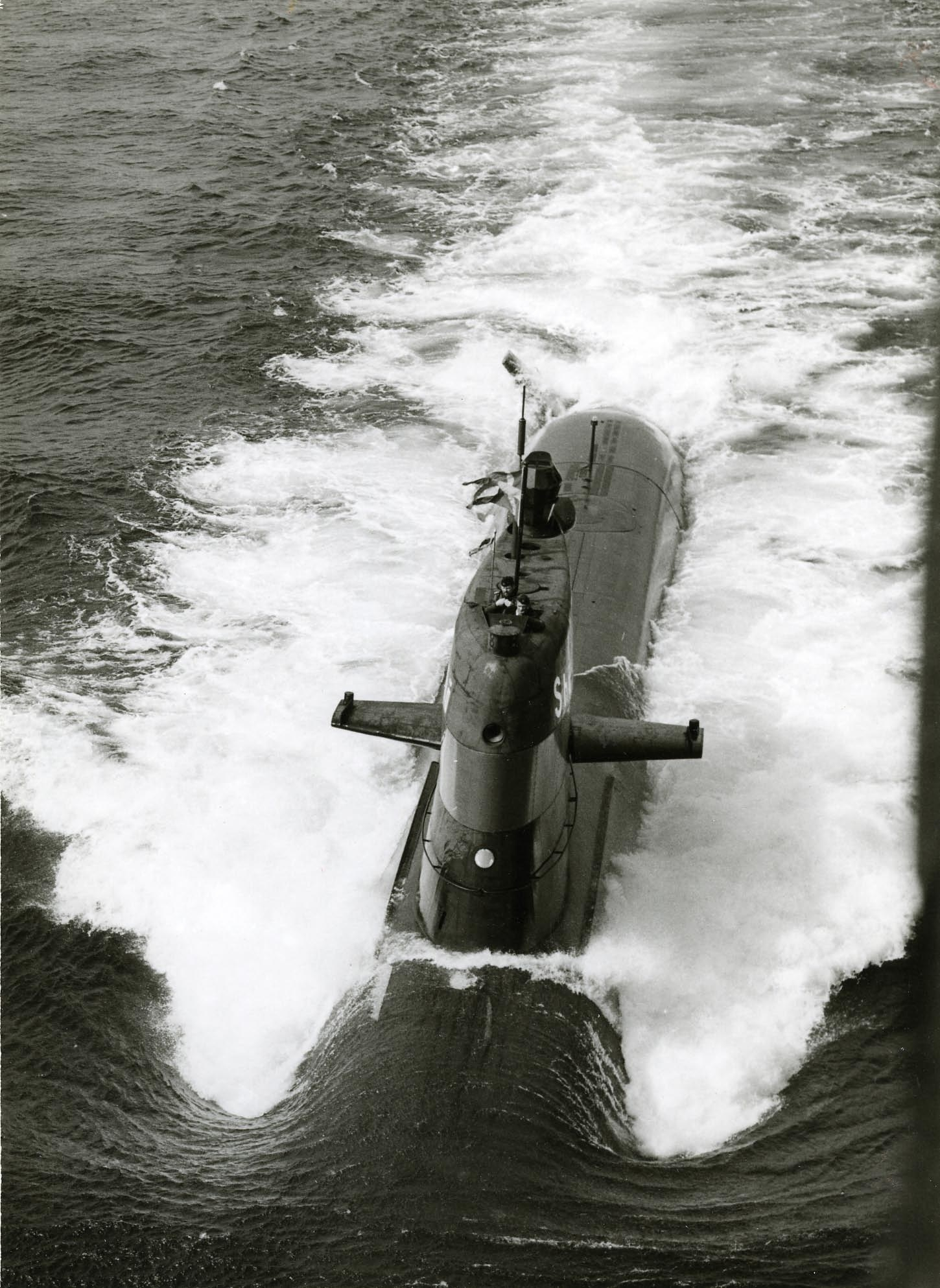
HSwMS Sjöhästen underway in 1968.

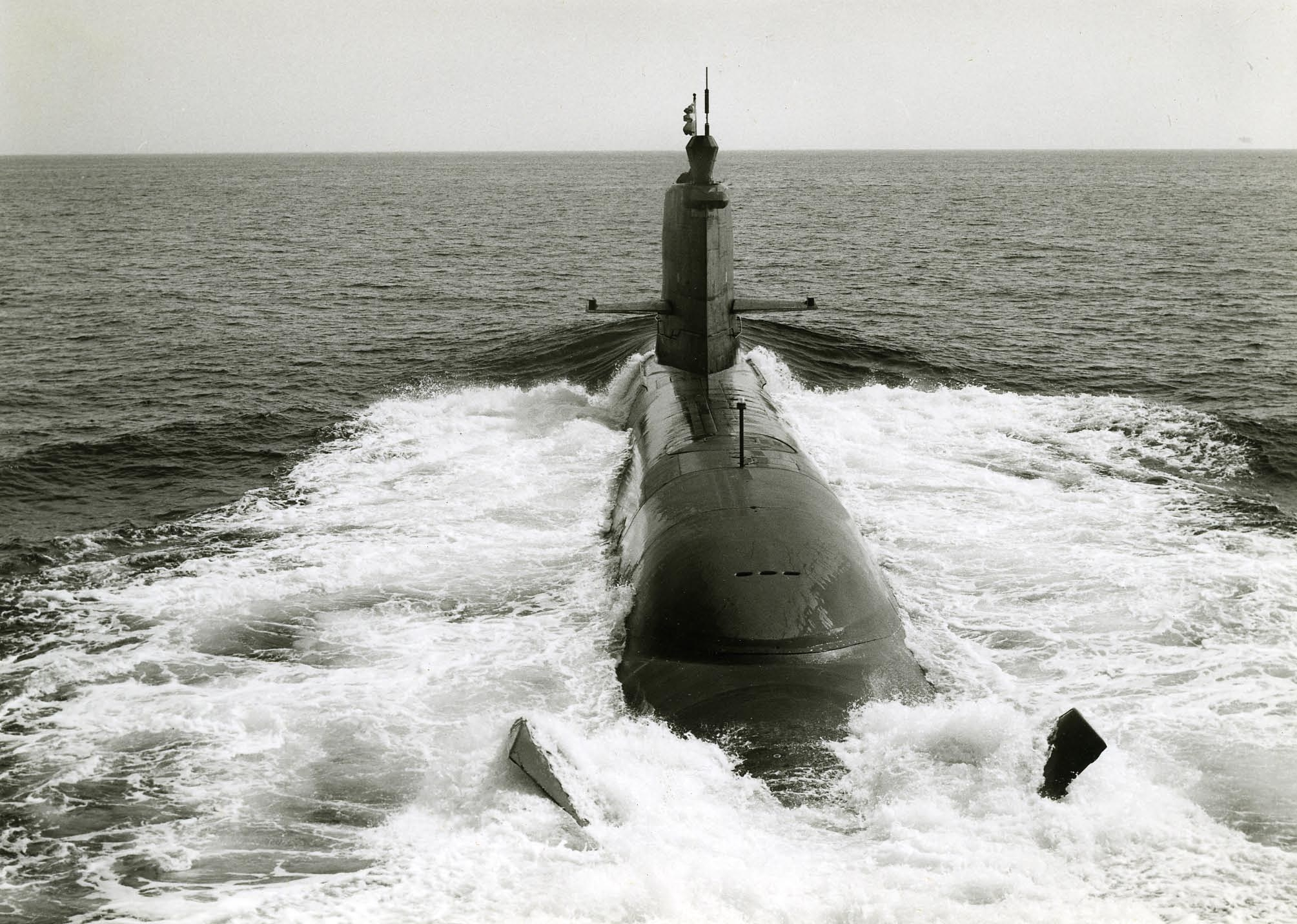
HSwMS Sjöhästen underway in 1968.

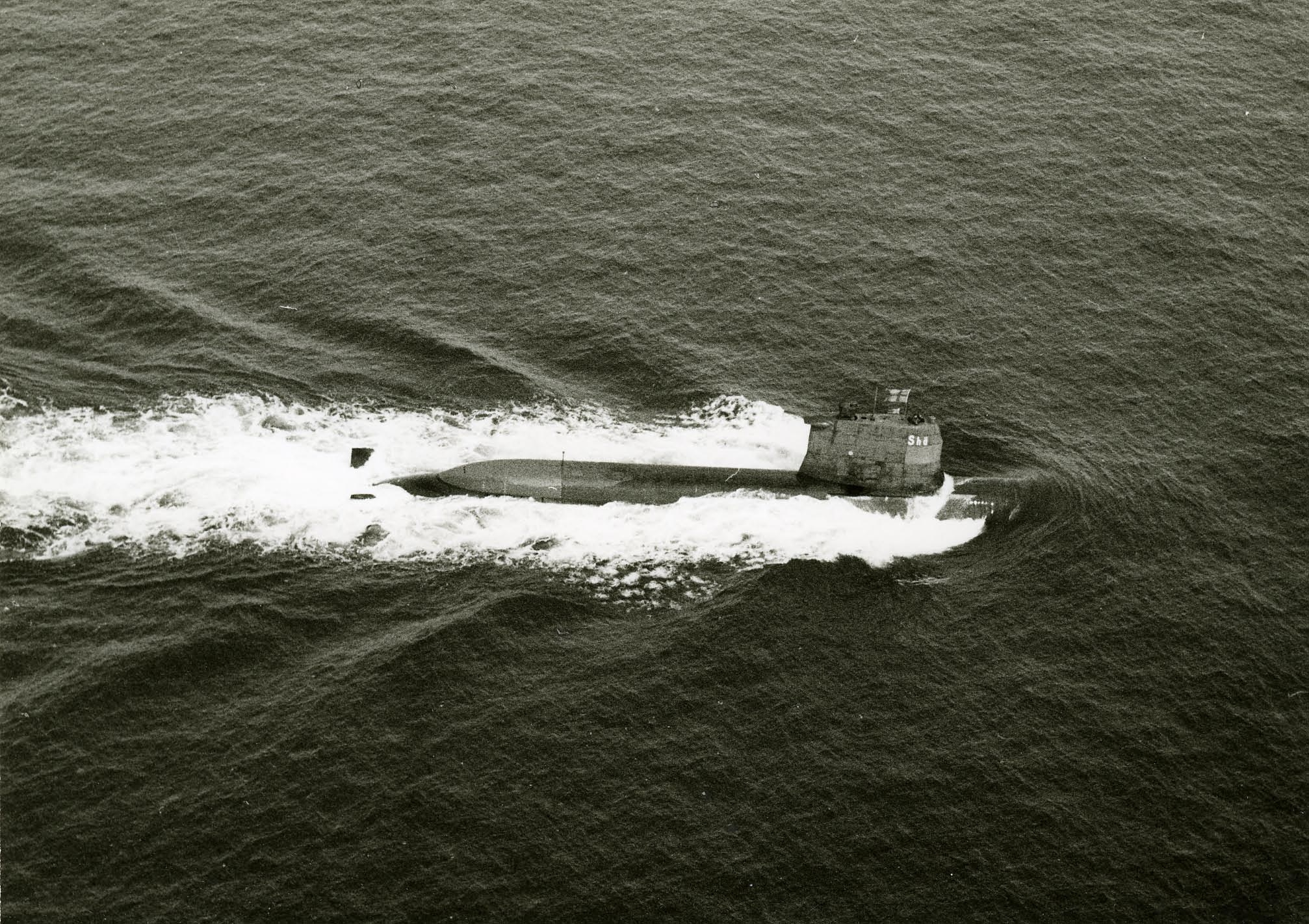
HSwMS Sjöhästen underway in 1968.
