= HSwMS Sjöhunden (1968) =

Swedish submarine

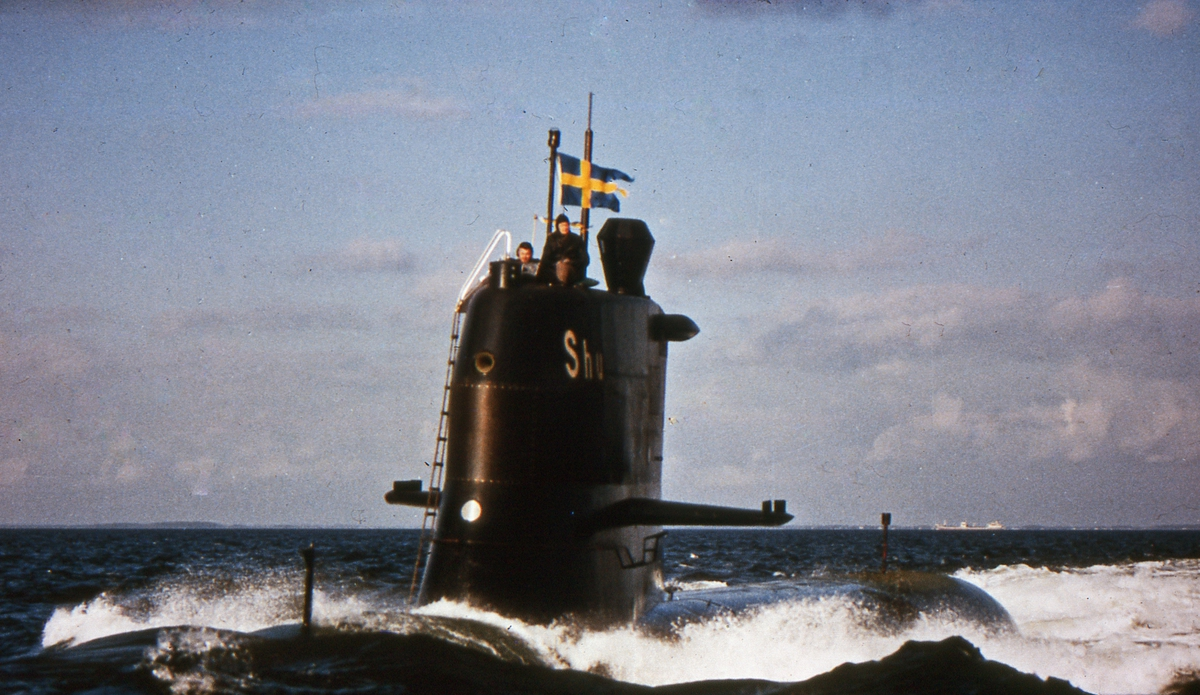
- HSwMS Sjöhunden underway between 1968-1997

History

Sweden
- Name: Sjöhunden
- Namesake: Sjöhunden
- Ordered: 1966
- Builder: Karlskrona
- Launched: 21 March 1968
- Commissioned: 25 July 1969
- Decommissioned: 1997
- Home port: Stockholm
- Motto: Cave canem; (Beware of the dog)
- Nickname(s): Shu
- Fate: Sold to Singapore in 1997

Singapore
- Name: Chieftain
- Namesake: Chieftain
- Acquired: 28 May 1999
- Commissioned: 26 June 2004
- Decommissioned: 25 November 2024
- Home port: Changi
- Status: Decommissioned

General characteristics
- Class & type: Sjöormen-class submarine; Challenger-class submarine
- Displacement: 1,130 t (1,112 long tons) surfaced; 1,210 t (1,191 long tons) submerged
- Length: 50.5 m (165 ft 8 in)
- Beam: 6.1 m (20 ft 0 in)
- Draught: 5.8 m (19 ft 0 in)
- Propulsion: 2 × Hedemora Diesel generators; 1 × electric motor; 1 shaft
- Speed: 20 knots (37 km/h; 23 mph)
- Complement: 25 officers and enlisted
- Armament: 4 × (533 mm (21 in) torpedo tubes); 2 × (400 mm (16 in) torpedo tubes)

HSwMS Sjöhunden (Shu), Sw. meaning sea dog, was the fourth ship of the Swedish submarine class Sjöormen, project name A11.

== Development ==
The planning of the class included a number of different AIP-solutions including nuclear propulsion, however the ships where finally completed with for the time extremely large batteries. The ship was a single hull submarine, with hull shape influenced by the American experimental submarine USS Albacore. The hull was covered with rubber tiles to reduce the acoustic signature (Anechoic tiles), at this time a pioneer technology. The Sjöormen class also pioneered the use of an x-shaped (as opposed to cross-shaped) rudder as a standard (as opposed to experimental) feature.

== Service history ==
The submarine served in the Swedish Navy for almost 30 years and was then sold to Singapore in 1997 together with its four sister ships.

HSwMS Sjöhunden was renamed RSS Chieftain after Singapore acquired the boat on 28 May 1999. She was commissioned into the Republic of Singapore Navy on 26 June 2004 after a major refit. On 25 November 2024, she was decommissioned after 20 years of service.

== Gallery ==
HSwMS Sjöhunden & RSS Chieftain gallery

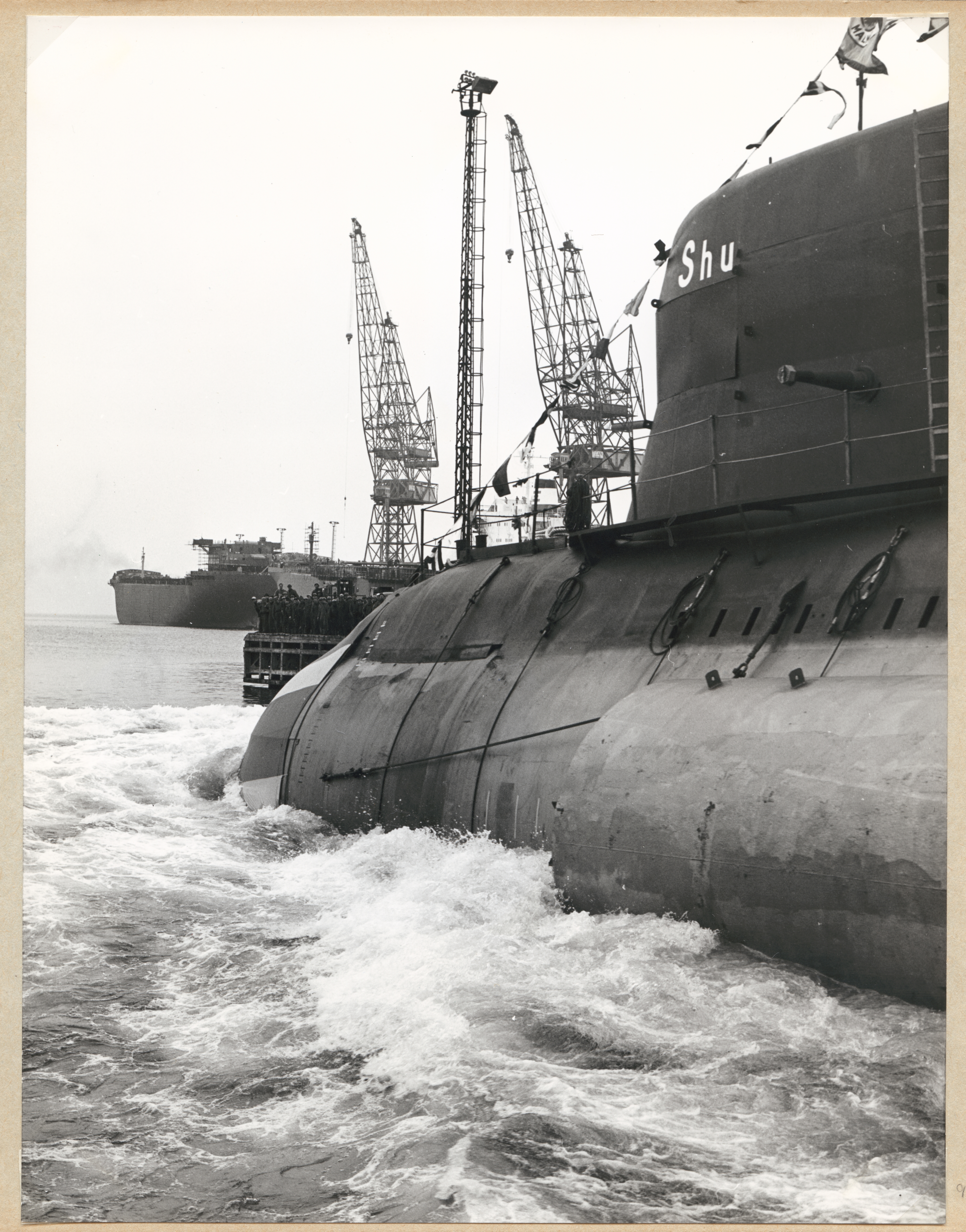
HSwMS Sjöhunden being launched on 21 March 1968.

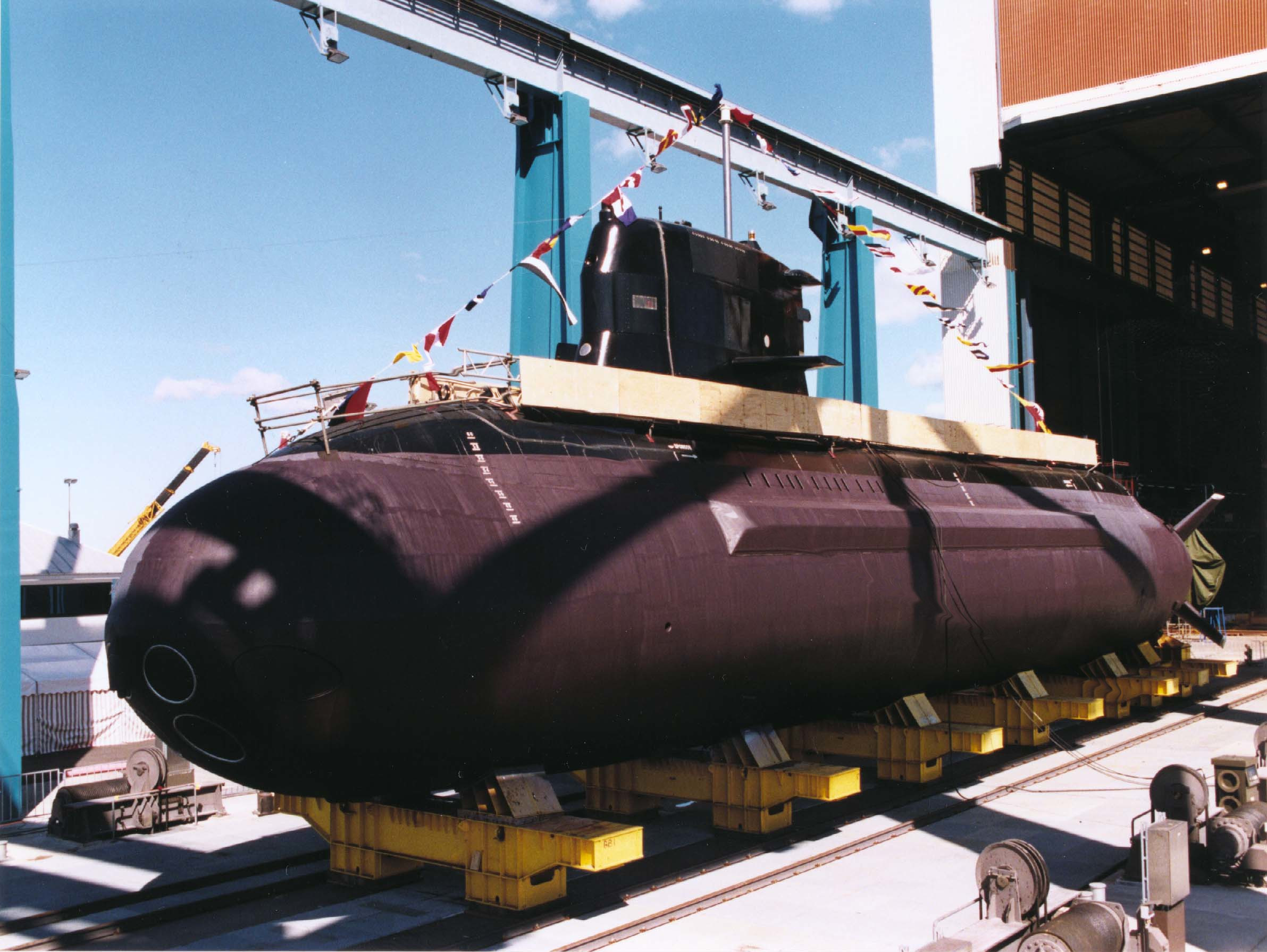
RSS Chieftain during refurbishment in Sweden

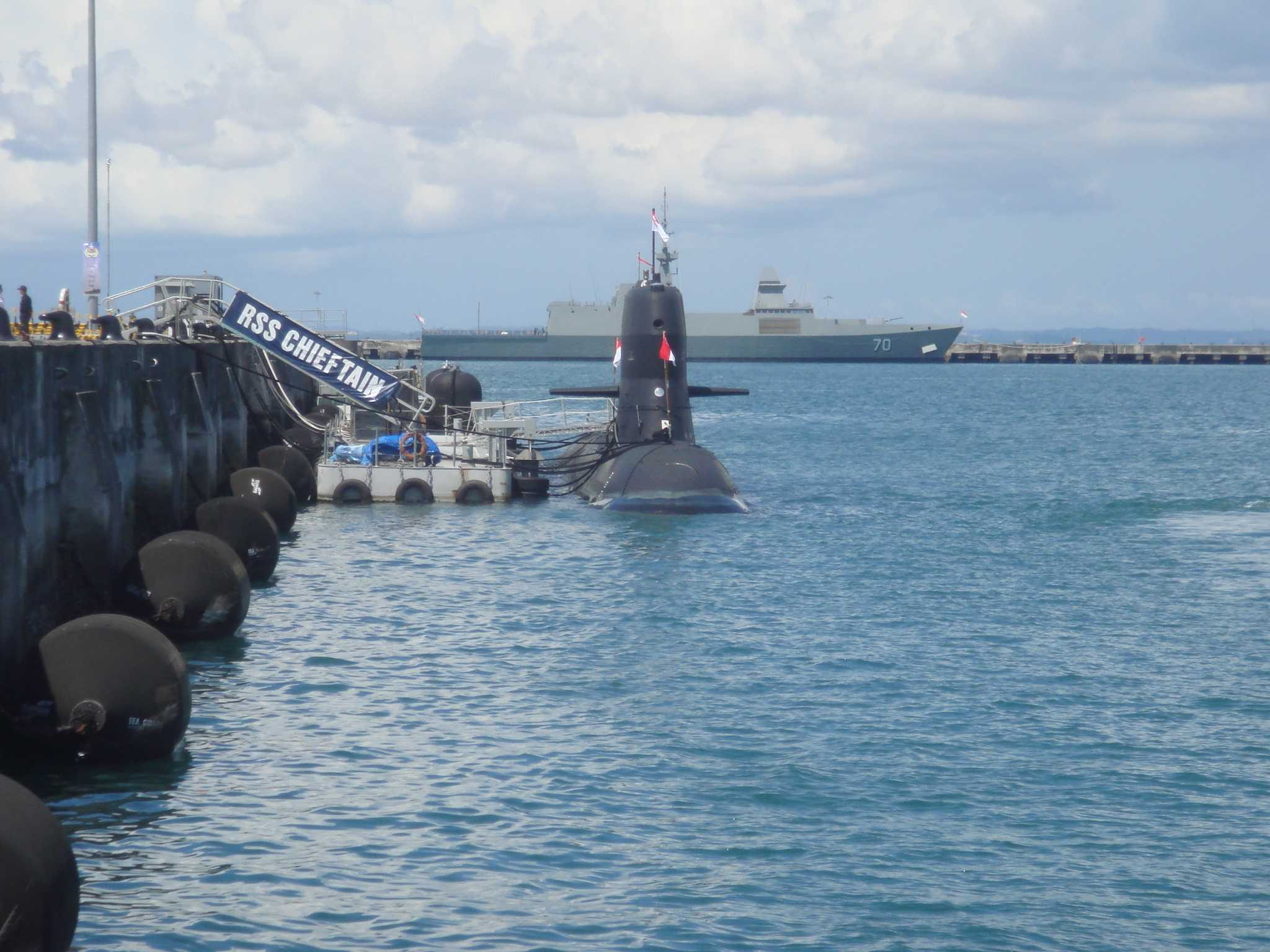
RSS Chieftain in 2007.

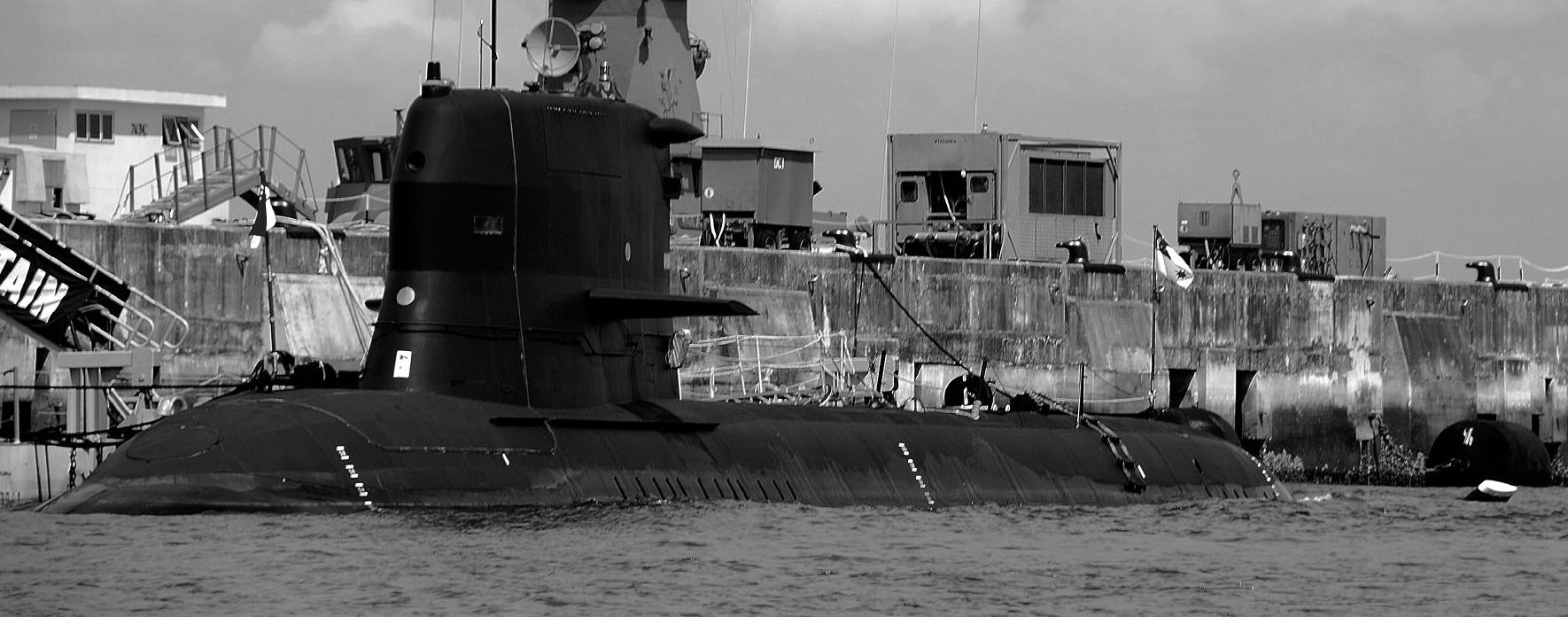
RSS Chieftain in 2007.
