= HSwMS Sjölejonet (1967) =

Swedish submarine

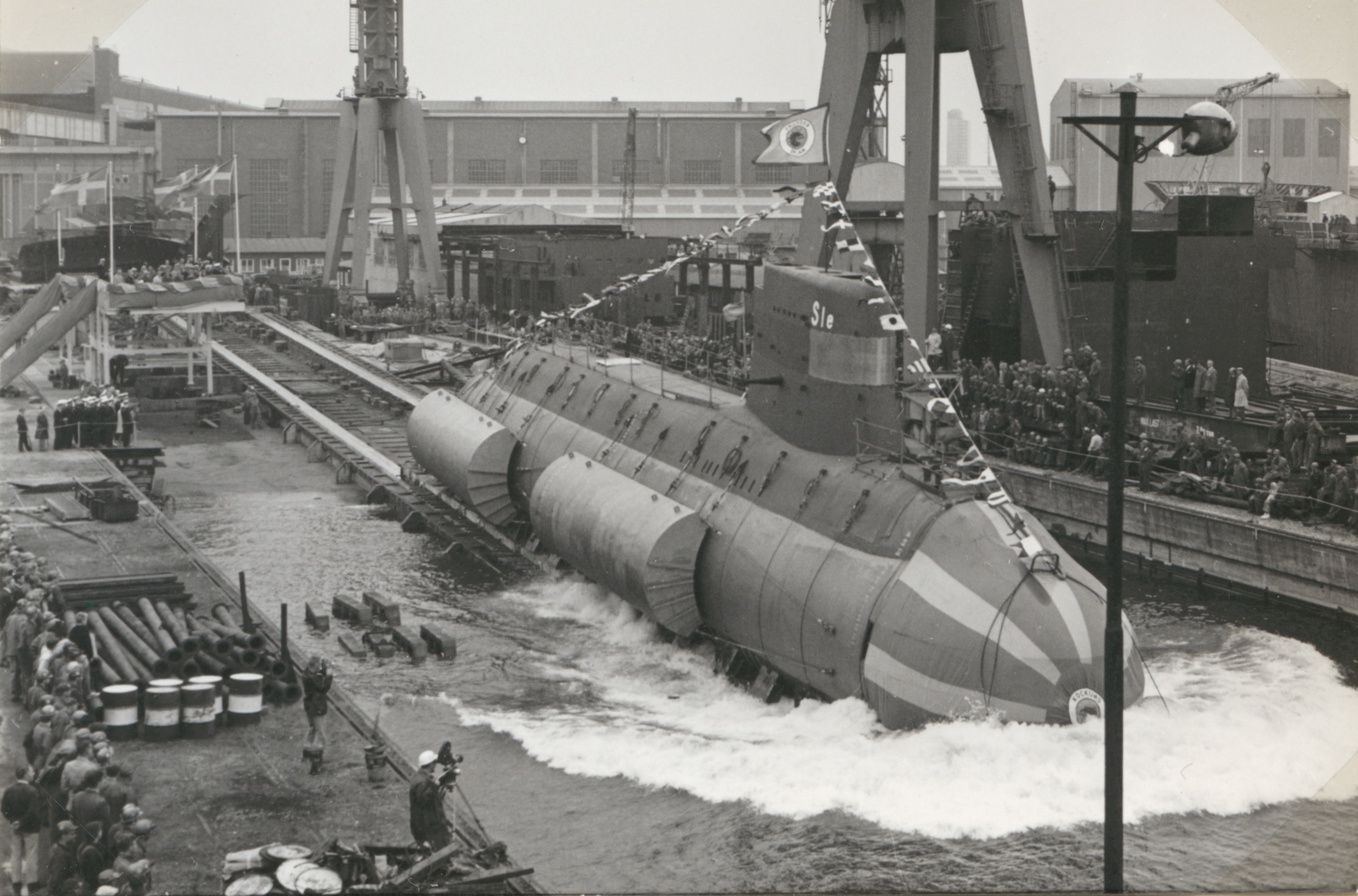
- HSwMS Sjölejonet being launched on 29 June 1967

History

Sweden
- Name: Sjölejonet
- Namesake: Sjölejonet
- Ordered: 1965
- Builder: Karlskrona
- Launched: 29 June 1967
- Commissioned: 16 December 1968
- Decommissioned: 1997
- Motto: In omnia paratus; (Ready for anything)
- Nickname(s): Sle
- Fate: Sold to Singapore in 1997

Singapore
- Name: Conqueror
- Namesake: Conqueror
- Acquired: 28 May 1999
- Commissioned: 26 June 2004
- Decommissioned: 25 November 2024
- Home port: Changi
- Status: Decommissioned

General characteristics
- Class & type: Sjöormen-class submarine; Challenger-class submarine
- Displacement: 1,130 t (1,112 long tons) surfaced; 1,210 t (1,191 long tons) submerged
- Length: 50.5 m (165 ft 8 in)
- Beam: 6.1 m (20 ft 0 in)
- Draught: 5.8 m (19 ft 0 in)
- Propulsion: 2 × Hedemora Diesel generators; 1 × electric motor; 1 shaft
- Speed: 20 knots (37 km/h; 23 mph)
- Complement: 25 officers and enlisted
- Armament: 4 × 533 mm (21 in) torpedo tubes; 2 × 400 mm (16 in) torpedo tubes

HSwMS Sjölejonet (Sle), (Sw. meaning sea lion), was the second ship of the Swedish submarine class Sjöormen, project name A11.

== Development ==
The planning of the class included a number of different AIP solutions including nuclear propulsion. However, the ships where finally completed with for the time extremely large batteries. The ship was a single-hulled submarine, with hull shape influenced by the American experimental submarine USS Albacore. The hull was covered with rubber tiles to reduce the acoustic signature (anechoic tiles), at this time a pioneer technology. The Sjöormen class also pioneered the use of an x-shaped (as opposed to cross-shaped) rudder as a standard (as opposed to experimental) feature.

== Service in Sweden ==
The submarine served in the Swedish Navy for almost 30 years and was then sold to Singapore in 1997 together with its four sister ships.

== Service in Singapore ==
HSwMS Sjöbjörnen was renamed RSS Conqueror after Singapore acquired the boat on 28 May 1999. She was commissioned into the Republic of Singapore Navy on 26 June 2004 after a major refit. As of 25 November 2024, she was decommissioned after 20 years of service.

== Gallery ==
HSwMS Sjölejonet & RSS Conqueror Gallery

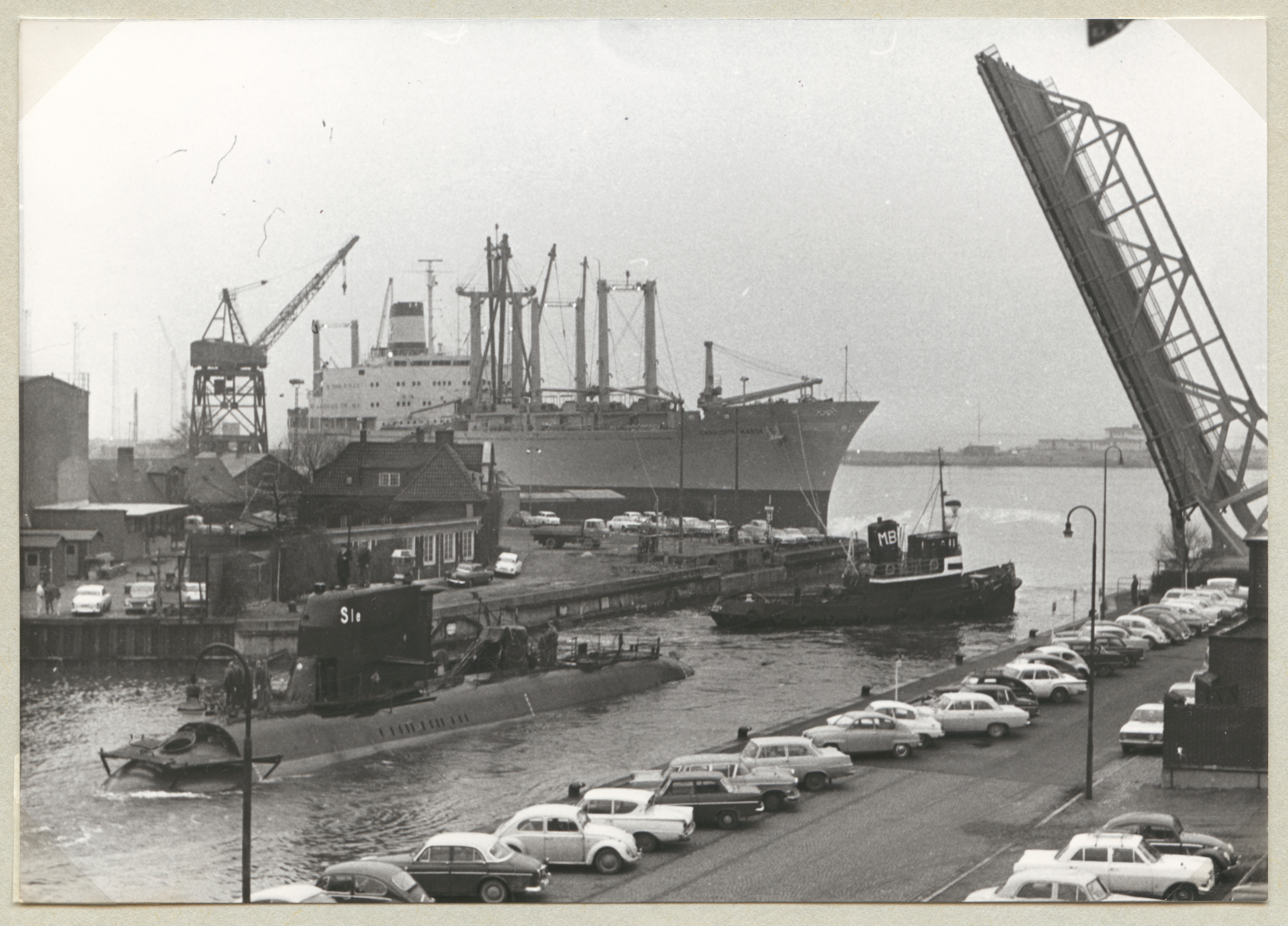
HSwMS Sjölejonet being towed out of harbor after her being launched in July 1967.

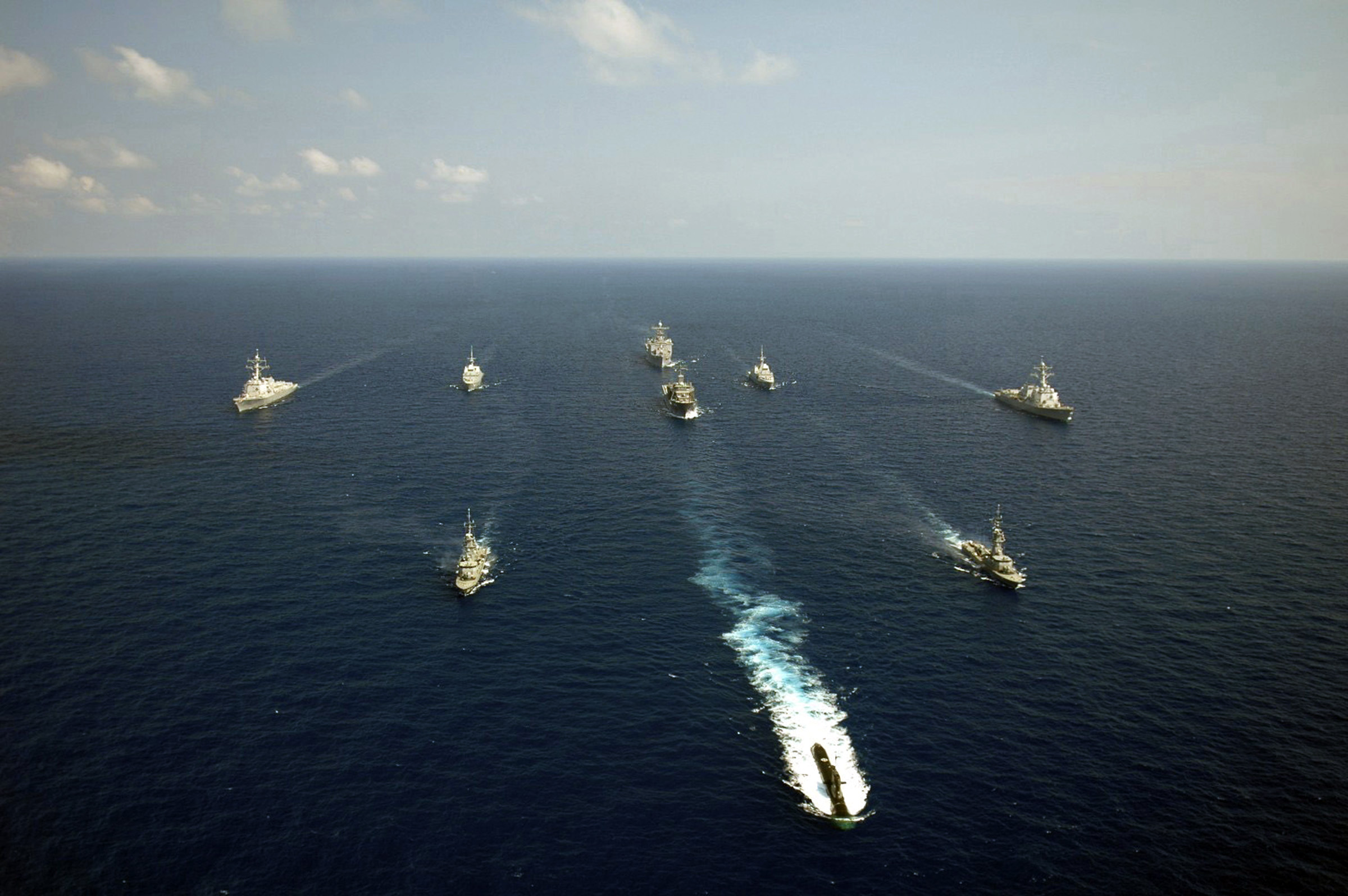
RSS Conqueror with other RSN and US Navy ships during Cooperation Afloat Readiness and Training (CARAT) 2009.
