= HSwMS Sjöormen (Sor) =

Swedish submarine

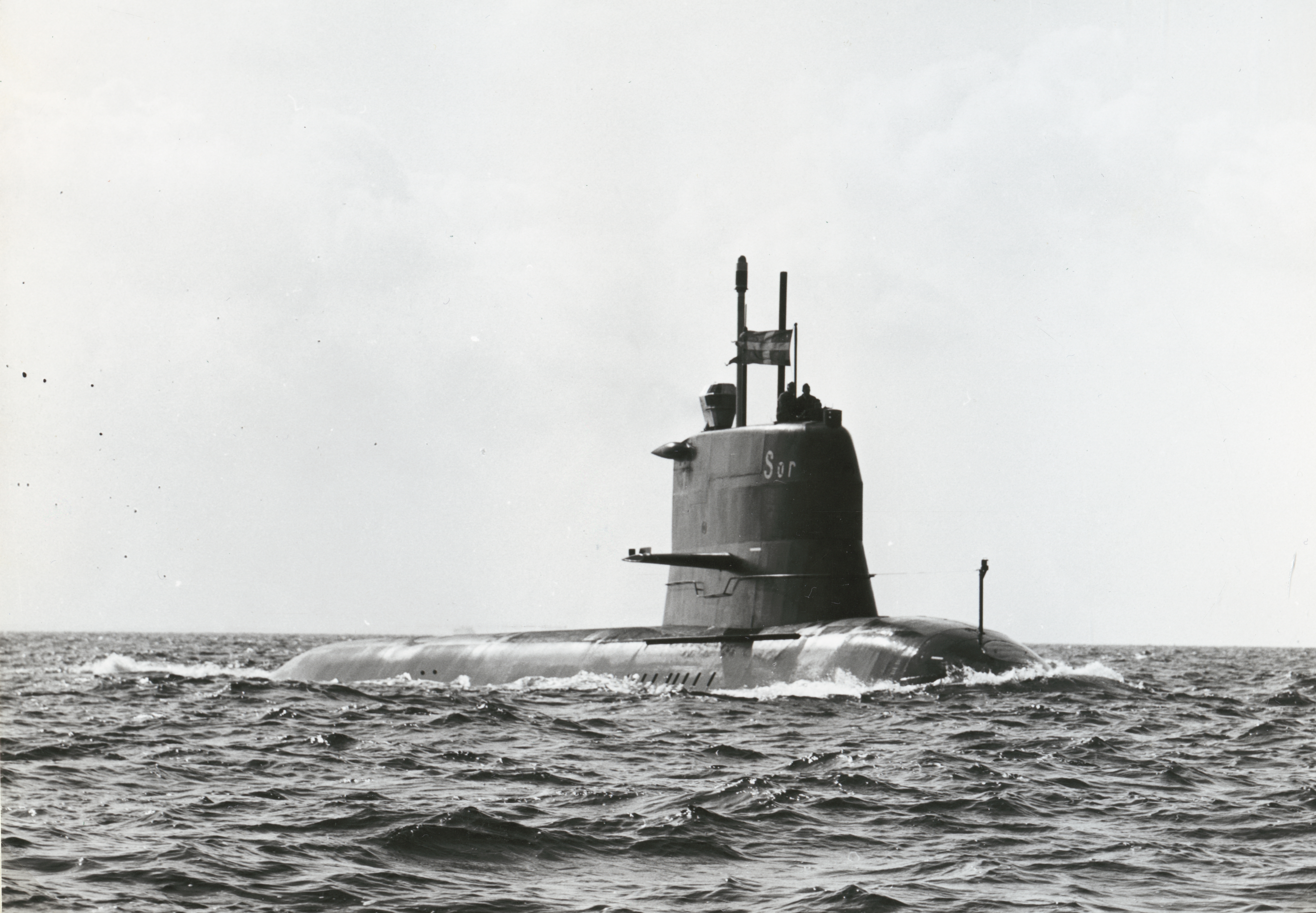
- HSwMS Sjöormen in August 1967

History

Sweden
- Name: Sjöormen
- Builder: Kockums
- Laid down: 1966
- Launched: 25 January 1967
- Commissioned: 31 July 1968
- Decommissioned: 1997
- Motto: Esse non videre; (To be without being seen)
- Nickname(s): Sor
- Fate: Sold to Singapore in 1997

Singapore
- Name: Centurion
- Namesake: Centurion
- Acquired: 28 May 1999
- Commissioned: 26 June 2004
- Decommissioned: 11 March 2015
- Home port: Changi
- Fate: Scrapped

General characteristics
- Class & type: Sjöormen-class submarine; Challenger-class submarine
- Displacement: 1,130 t (1,112 long tons) surfaced; 1,210 t (1,191 long tons) submerged
- Length: 50.5 m (165 ft 8 in)
- Beam: 6.1 m (20 ft 0 in)
- Draught: 5.8 m (19 ft 0 in)
- Propulsion: 2 × Hedemora diesel generators; 1 × electric motor; 1 shaft
- Speed: 20 knots (37 km/h; 23 mph)
- Complement: 25 officers and enlisted
- Armament: 4 × 533 mm (21 in) torpedo tubes; 2 × 400 mm (16 in) torpedo tubes

HSwMS Sjöormen (Sor), Sw. meaning sea serpent, was the lead ship of the Swedish submarine class Sjöormen, project name A11.

== Development ==
The planning of the class included a number of different AIP solutions including nuclear propulsion. However, the ships where finally completed with for the time extremely large batteries. The ship was a single-hulled submarine, with hull shape influenced by the American experimental submarine USS Albacore. The hull was covered with rubber tiles to reduce the acoustic signature (anechoic tiles), at this time a pioneering technology. The Sjöormen class also pioneered the use of an x-shaped (as opposed to cross-shaped) rudder as a standard (as opposed to experimental) feature.

== Service in Sweden ==
The submarine served in the Swedish Navy for almost 30 years and was then sold to Singapore in 1997 together with its four sister ships.

== Service in Singapore ==
HSwMS Sjöormen was renamed RSS Centurion and Singapore reacquired the boat on 28 May 1999. She was commissioned on 26 June 2004 after a major refit. After 11 years in the Republic of Singapore Navy, she was decommissioned on 11 March 2015 and scrapped. Her fin and sail were preserved as a memorial at the Republic of Singapore Navy Museum.

== Gallery ==
HSwMS Sjöormen & RSS Centurion gallery

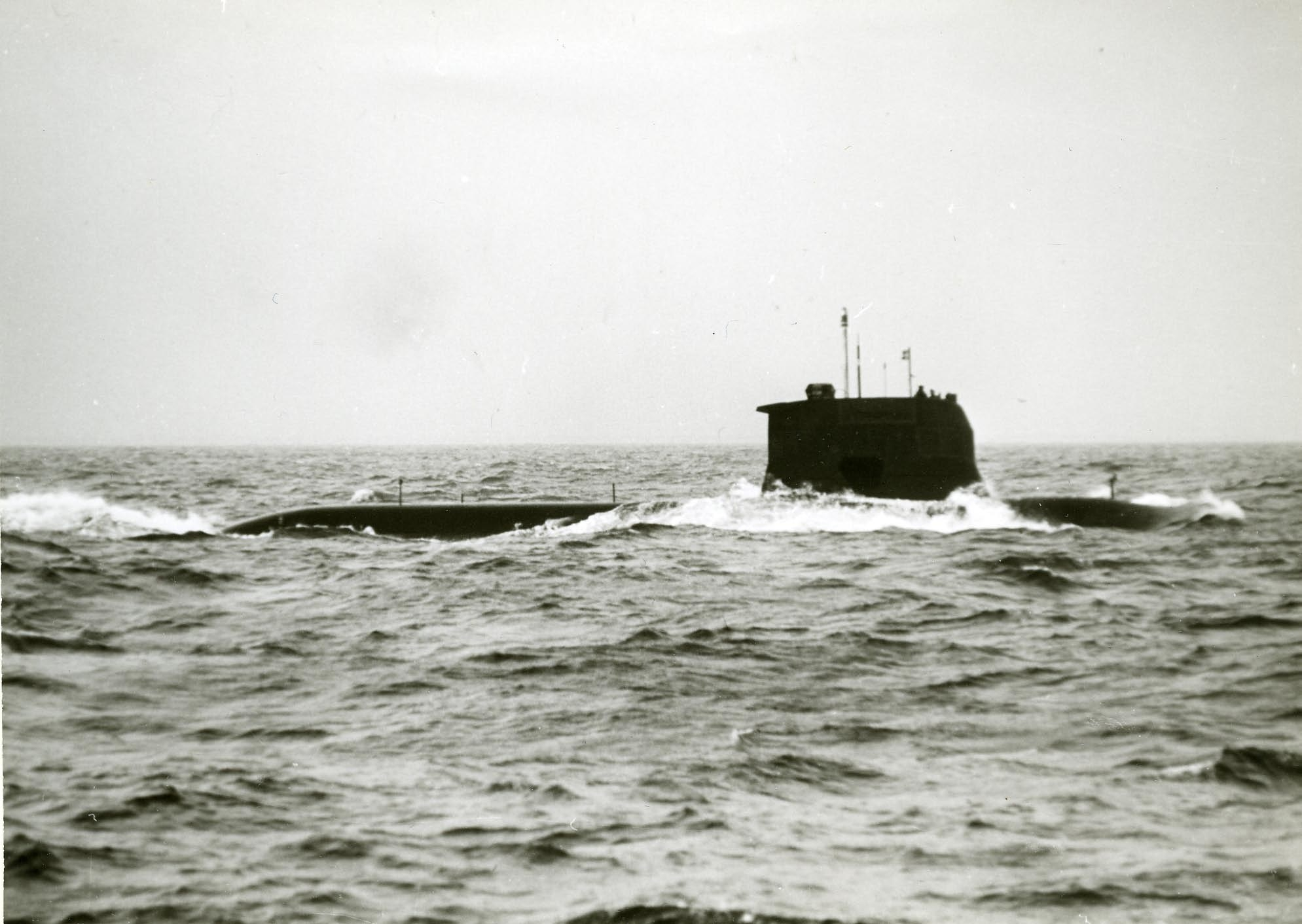
HSwMS Sjöormen underway in 1968.

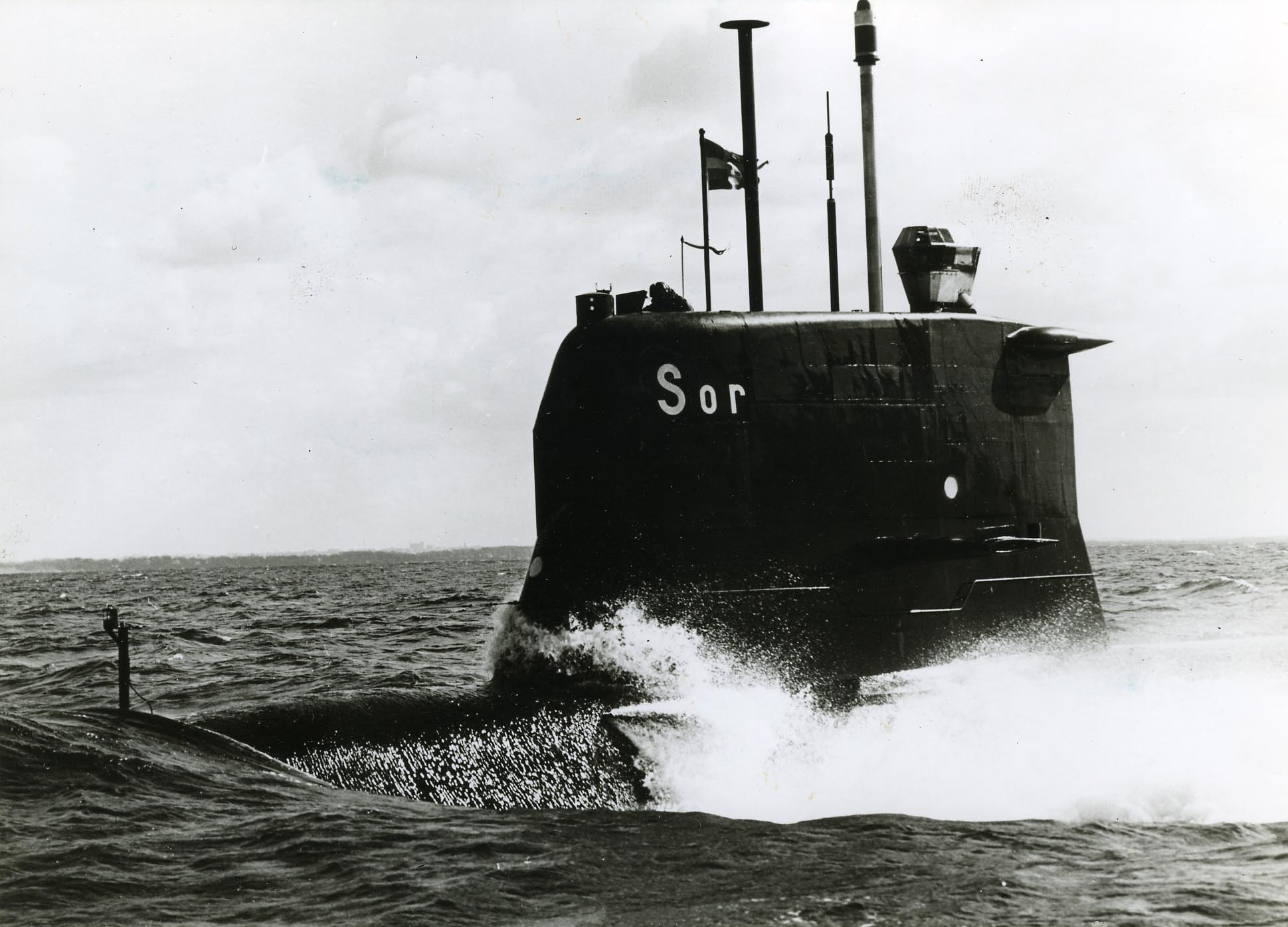
HSwMS Sjöormen underway in 1968.

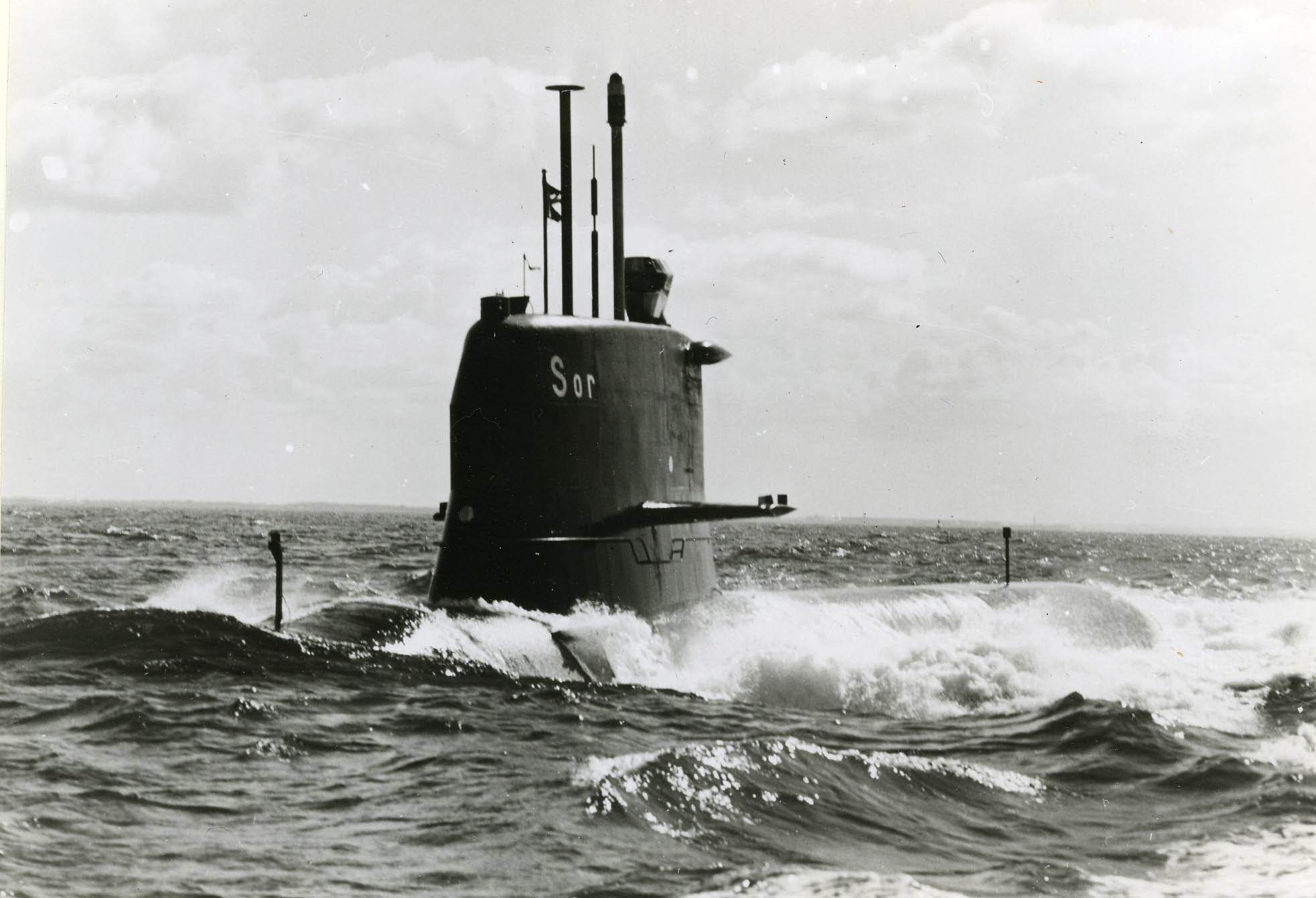
HSwMS Sjöormen underway in 1968.

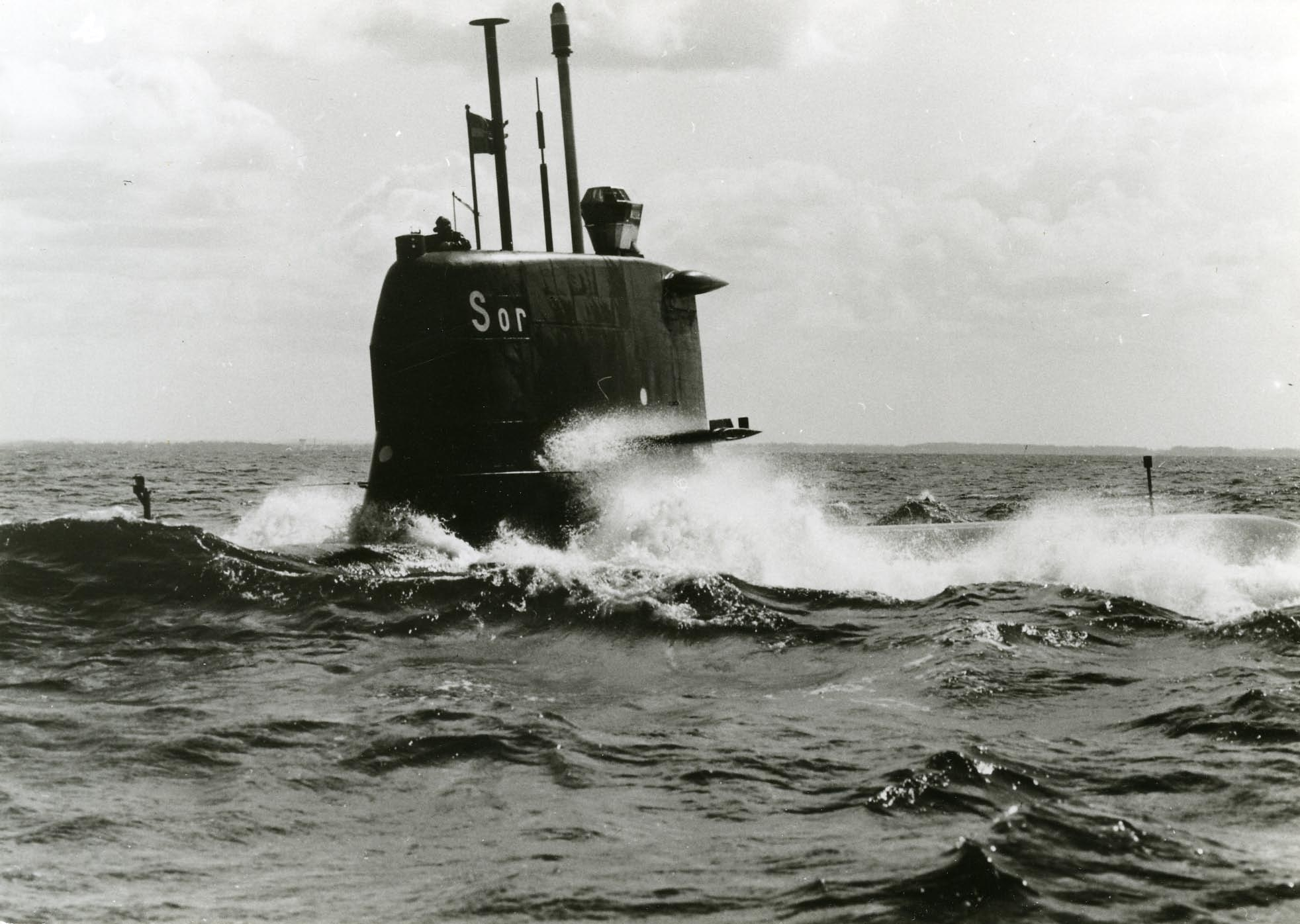
HSwMS Sjöormen underway in 1968.

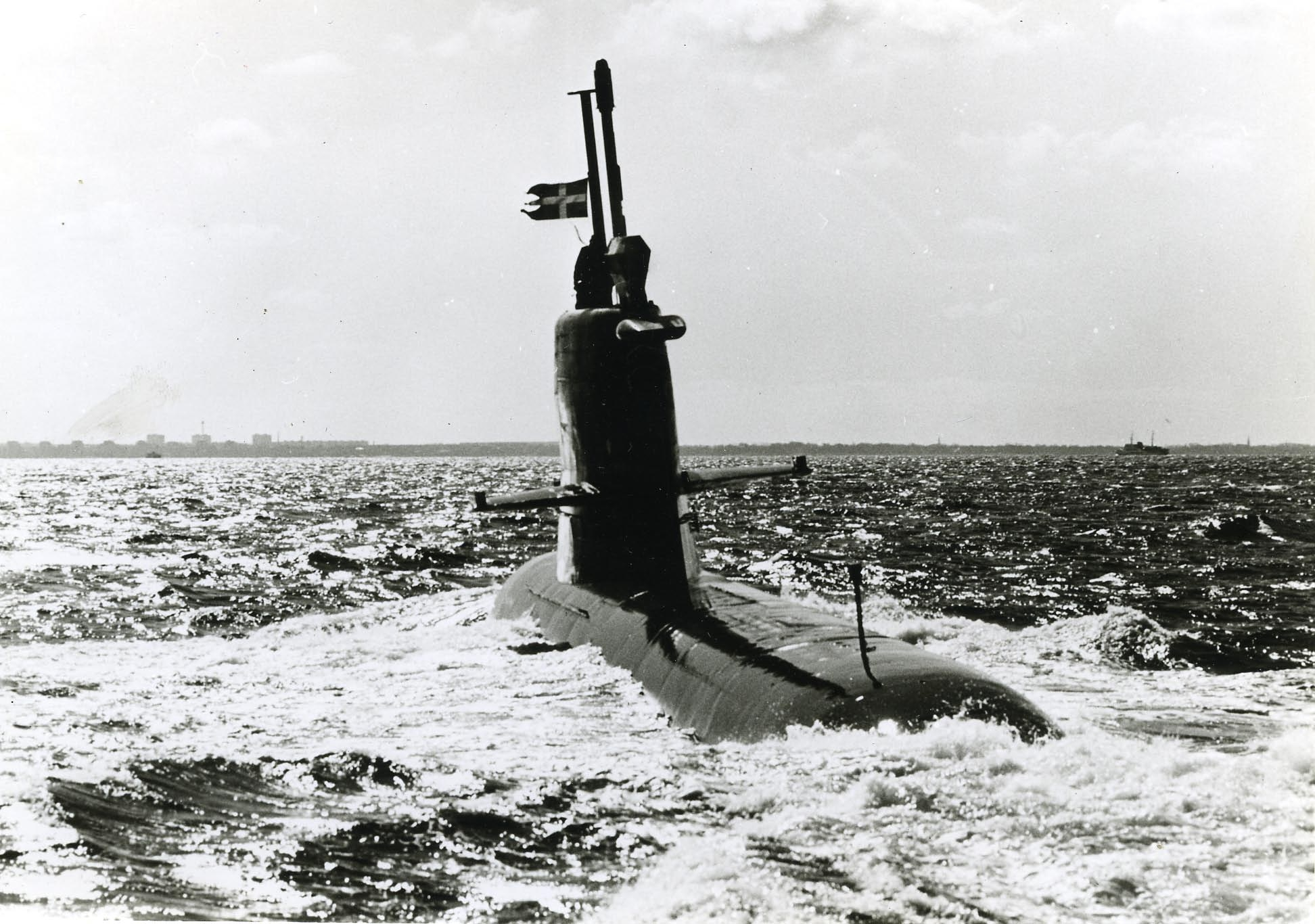
HSwMS Sjöormen underway in 1968.

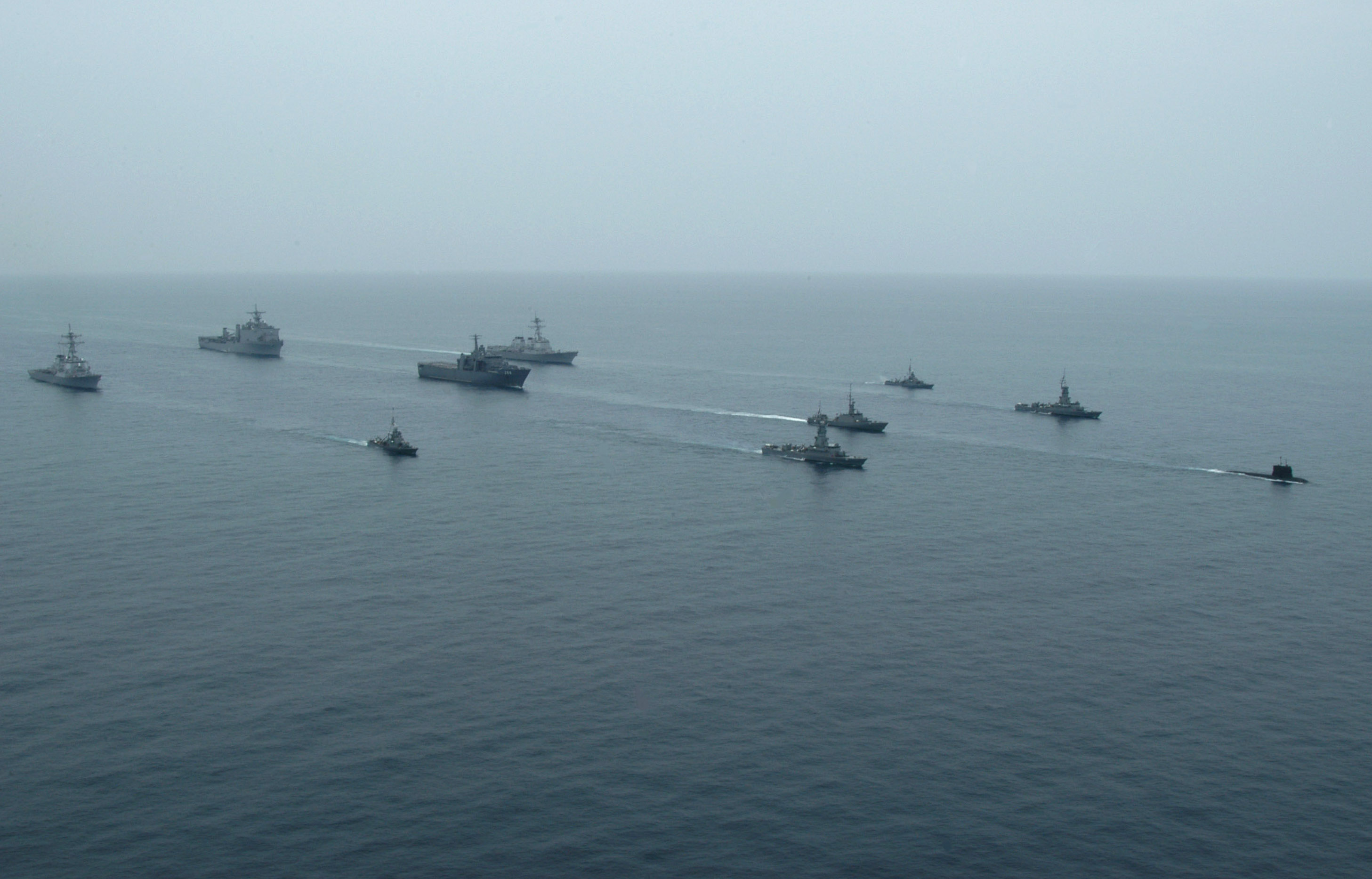
RSS Centurion leading a combined US and RSN task group during Cooperation Afloat Readiness and Training (CARAT) 2004.

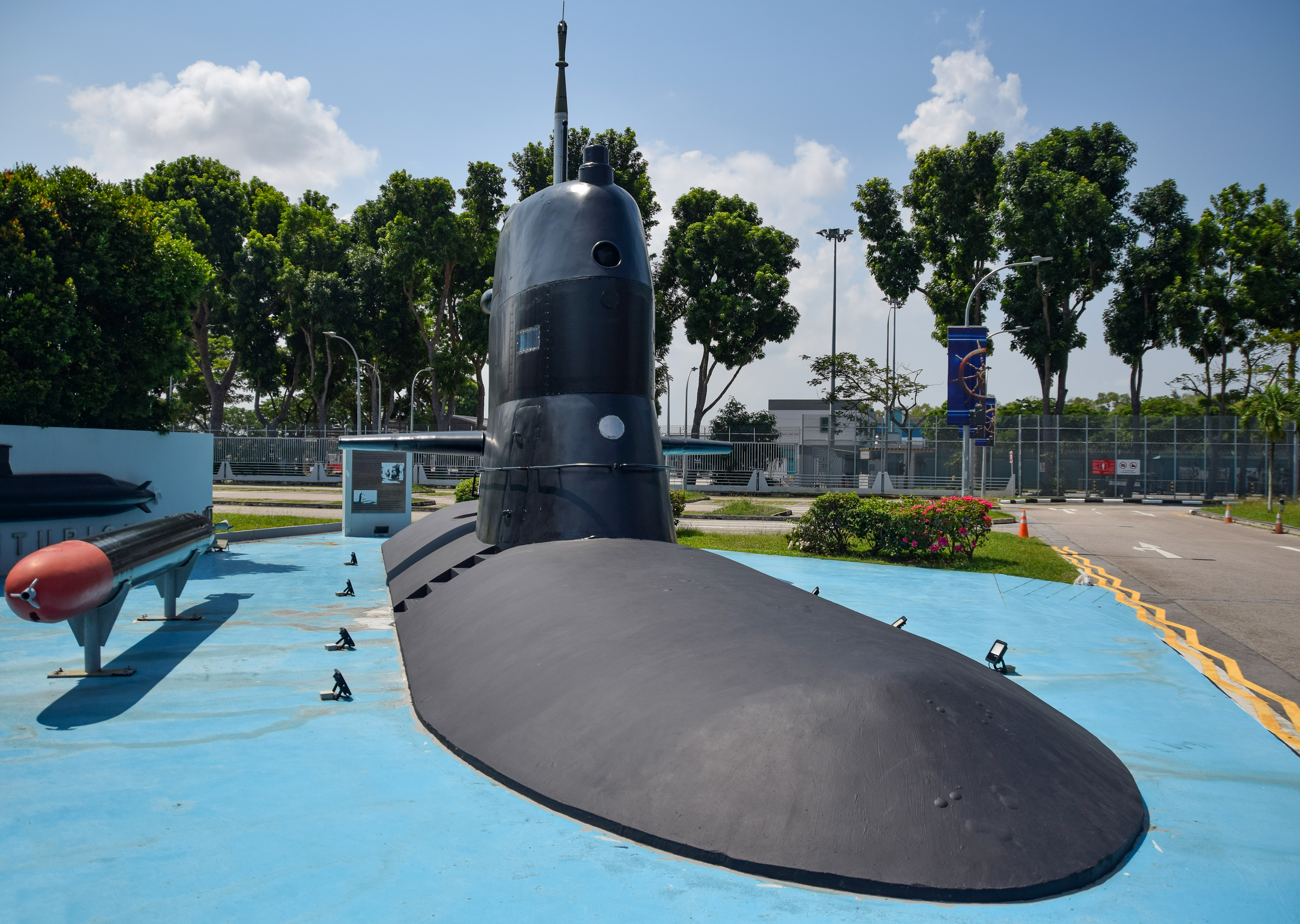
RSS Centurion fin and sail at the Singapore Navy Museum
