= Sjölejonet-class submarine =

Swedish submarines (1938–1964)

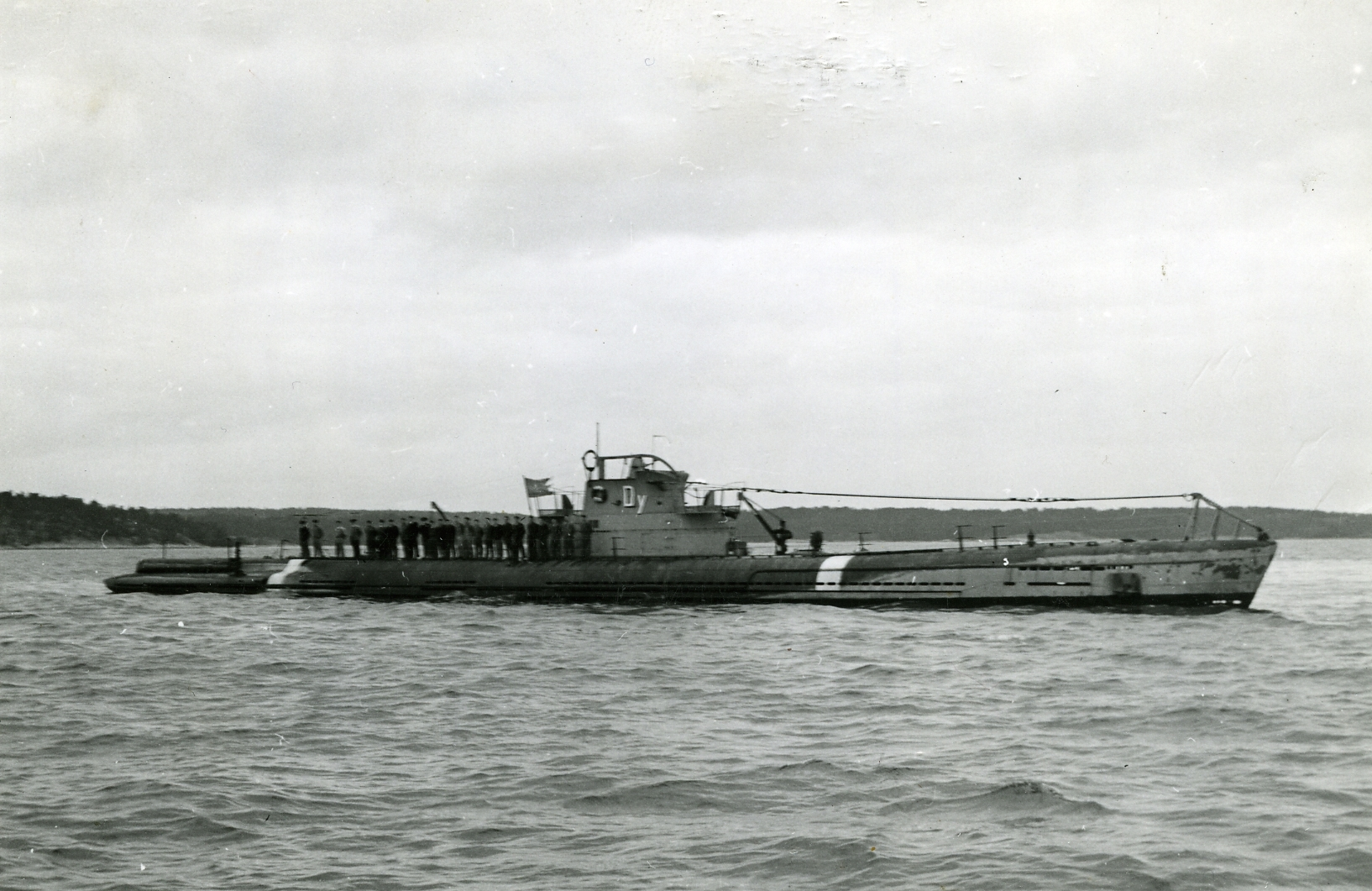
- Dykaren in coastal waters, sometime in 1943 or 1944

Class overview
- Name: Sjölejonet class
- Builders: Kockums, Malmö
- Operators: Swedish Navy
- Succeeded by: Neptun class
- Built: 1935–1942
- In service: 1938–1964
- Completed: 9

General characteristics
- Type: Coastal submarine
- Displacement: Surfaced: 580 tons; Submerged: 760 tons
- Length: 210 ft 8 in (64.21 m)
- Beam: 21 ft (6.4 m)
- Draft: 11 ft 2 in (3.40 m)
- Speed: Surfaced: 16 knots (30 km/h; 18 mph); Submerged: 9 knots (17 km/h; 10 mph)
- Complement: 35
- Armament: 6 × 533 mm (21.0 in) torpedo tubes; 2 × 40 mm (1.6 in) deck guns

The Sjölejonet class was a series of nine coastal patrol submarines operated by the Swedish Navy during World War II and early Cold War. The boats were developed as part of a Navy modernization program intended to counteract Germany during the late 1930s. The boats were the first indigenous Swedish design, and incorporated unique weapons. During World War II, the boats conducted patrols along the coast to maintain Swedish neutrality. By the start of the Cold War, the vessels were retrofitted before being withdrawn from service by the early 1960s and being replaced by the Sjöormen class.

== Development and design ==
Throughout the 1930s, Sweden became increasingly concerned regarding German expansionism and greater Nazi influence in the Baltic. As a result, the Riksdag began an initiative to modernize and reformed the military. That decade, the Navy was in the process of replacing World War I-era submarine fleet with new boats. As part of this effort, the Sjölejonet class was intended to be small submarines ideal for patrols along the Swedish coast. The design featured a length of 210 feet 8 inches (64.21 m), beam of 21 feet (6.4 m), and a draught of 11 feet 2 inches (3.40 m). They featured a complement of 35 and were propelled by two MAN Diesel engines which produced 2,100 brake horsepower (1,600 kW) and two electric motors that produced 1,000 shaft horsepower (750 kW) through two propellers. While surfaced, the submarines had a maximum speed of 16 knots (30 km/h; 18 mph) and a displacement of 580 tons; when submerged, they had a speed of 9 knots (17 km/h; 10 mph) and displacement of 760 tons.

While previous Swedish submarines were based on foreign designs, the Sjölejonet class were the first indigenous designed Swedish submarines. The most unique aspect of the submarines was their armament. They were equipped with six 533 mm (21.0 in) torpedo tubes: three mounted in the bow, one in the stern, and two in remotely-controlled rotating mounts on the deck in a system similar to French submarines. On the deck were also two 40 mm (1.6 in) deck guns on top of disappearing mounts, which was common on Dutch submarines.

== Service history ==
Three submarines were initially ordered from Kockums, in Malmö, which were completed by 1939. As tensions increased by the end of the decade, another six were ordered, and were completed by 1942. The submarines were deployed to maintain Swedish neutrality during World War II. On 4 September 1942, Sjöborren collided with a ship and sank, although she was later repaired and brought back into service. In the 1950s, the submarines were refitted: the sail was streamlined, and both the deck guns and deck torpedo tubes were removed. The submarines were stricken between 1959 and 1964, with several names reused on new Sjöormen-class submarines in 1964.

== Ships in class ==
Data
Name	Laid down	Launched	Commissioned	Stricken
Sjölejonet	1935	25 July 1936	21 September 1938	15 May 1959
Sjöbjörnen	1936	15 January 1937	20 March 1938	1 November 1964
Sjöhunden	1937	26 November 1938	18 December 1939	1 July 1960
Svärdfisken	1939	18 May 1940	26 April 1941	15 May 1959
Tumlaren	1940	8 September 1940	19 July 1941	1 January 1964
Dykaren	1940	17 December 1940	18 October 1941	1 December 1959
Sjöhästen	1940	19 October 1940	16 July 1941	1 April 1963
Sjöormen	1940	5 April 1941	3 December 1941	1 January 1964
Sjöborren	1941	14 June 1941	20 May 1942	15 June 1959
