= Sjöormen-class submarine =

Submarines built for the Swedish Navy

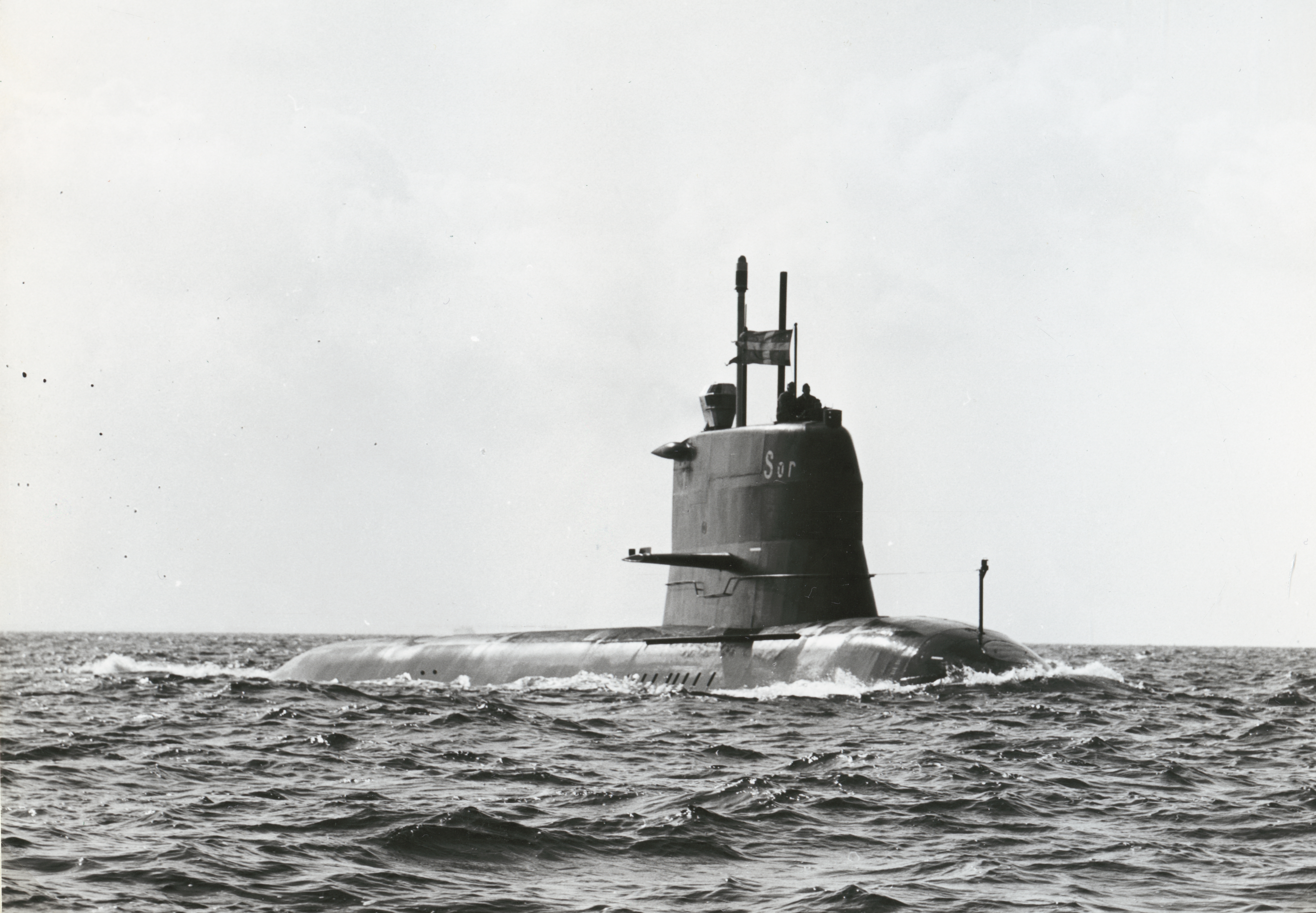
- HSwMS Sjöormen in August 1967

Class overview
- Name: Sjöormen class
- Builders: Kockums; Karlskrona Navy yard
- Operators: Swedish Navy; Republic of Singapore Navy
- Preceded by: Draken class
- Succeeded by: Näcken class
- Planned: 5
- Completed: 5
- Active: 0
- Retired: 5

General characteristics
- Type: Submarine
- Displacement: Surfaced: 1,075 t (1,058 long tons; 1,185 short tons); Submerged: 1,400 t (1,400 long tons; 1,500 short tons)
- Length: 51 m (167 ft 3.9 in)
- Beam: 6.1 m (20 ft 0.2 in)
- Draught: 5.8 m (19 ft 0.3 in)
- Propulsion: 2 × Pielstick diesel; 1 × ASEA electric motor; 1 shaft
- Speed: Surfaced: 15 knots (28 km/h; 17 mph); Submerged: 20 knots (37 km/h; 23 mph)
- Endurance: 21 days
- Test depth: 150 m (490 ft)
- Complement: 23
- Sensors & processing systems: FAS
- Armament: Bow: 4 × 533 mm (21 in) torpedo tubes; 2 × 400 mm (16 in) torpedo tubes; Mines

The Sjöormen class (Sea serpent) was a class of submarines built for the Swedish Navy in the late 1960s. They had a teardrop hull shape and were capable of diving to 150 metres (490 ft). At the time of their deployment they were regarded as one of the most advanced non-nuclear submarine classes in the world, incorporating many new features including an x-rudder and anechoic tiles. Both speed and underwater endurance were at the time very high for a conventional submarine. The submarines were retired by Sweden in the early 1990s. In the late 1990s, all five submarines were acquired by the Republic of Singapore Navy (RSN) and four were relaunched as the Challenger class following modernisation and tropicalisation. The fifth was never relaunched as it was used for spare parts and subsequently scrapped in the 2000s. As of November 2024, the Challenger class has been decommissioned.

== Description ==
As built, the Sjöormen class were designed with a teardrop hull shape, based on the United States' Barbel class. They had bow planes on the sail and their stern diving planes were configured in a x-shape. They had a standard displacement of 1,075 tonnes (1,058 long tons; 1,185 short tons) and 1,400 tonnes (1,378 long tons; 1,543 short tons) when dived. (Note: Gardiner & Chumbley have the standard displacement as 1,125 tonnes (1,107 long tons; 1,240 short tons).) The submarines had a waterline length of 50 metres (164.0 ft) and a length overall of 51 metres (167.3 ft). They had a beam of 6.1 metres (20.0 ft) and a draught of 5.8 metres (19.0 ft). The Sjöormen class was powered by a diesel-electric propulsion system composed of two Pielstick diesel engines providing power to an ASEA electric motor driving one shaft with a five-bladed propeller. The entire system was rated at 2,200 brake horsepower (1,600 kW). This gave the submarines a surfaced speed of 15 knots (28 km/h; 17 mph) and 20 knots (37 km/h; 23 mph) submerged. Designed for the confined waters of the Baltic Sea, the vessels had an endurance of 21 days and a test depth of 150 metres (490 ft).

As built the Sjöormen class were equipped with surface search radar and sonar. The submarines were armed with four 533 mm (21 in) torpedo tubes located in the bow for surface attack and two 408 mm (16 in) torpedo tubes in the stern for either anti-submarine warfare or for naval mines. The Sjöormen class had a complement of 23 officers and enlisted.

=== Swedish upgrades ===
In 1984–85, the Sjöormen class received upgraded Ericsson IBS-A17 fire control systems and CSU-83 sonar suites. In 1992, refits began on Sjölejonet and Sjöhunden that improved their electronics and their towed sonar array.

== Ships ==
| Ship name | Builder | Launched | Commissioned | Status |
|---|---|---|---|---|
| Sjöormen | Kockums | 25 January 1967 | 31 July 1968 | sold to Singapore, recommissioned as RSS Centurion |
| Sjölejonet | Kockums | 29 June 1967 | 16 December 1968 | sold to Singapore, recommissioned as RSS Conqueror |
| Sjöbjörnen | Karlskrona Navy yard | 9 January 1968 | 28 February 1969 | sold to Singapore, recommissioned as RSS Challenger |
| Sjöhunden | Kockums | 21 March 1968 | 25 June 1969 | sold to Singapore, recommissioned as RSS Chieftain |
| Sjöhästen | Karlskrona Navy yard | 6 August 1968 | 15 September 1969 | sold to Singapore, not recommissioned, used for spare parts |

== Service history ==
The Sjöormen class were ordered by the Swedish Navy in 1961. The first boat in the class, Sjöormen, entered service in 1968. In 1992, two vessels in the class, Sjölejonet and Sjöhunden, underwent modernisation. The remaining three were supposed to remain in service until the Gotland class became operational, but due to lack of funding, all were laid up in 1993.

All five submarines were sold to the Republic of Singapore Navy (RSN) in the late 1990s and four entered service as the Challenger class following modernisation and tropicalisation, while the fifth was used for spare parts and subsequently scrapped in the late 2000s.

== See also ==
Equivalent submarines of the same era

- Asashio class
- Type 035
- Potvis class
