= Power Station =

Power Station or The Power Station may refer to:

- Power station, a facility for the generation of electricity

== Music ==
- The Power Station (band), a 1980s supergroup
  - The Power Station (album), a 1985 album by The Power Station
- Power Station (Taiwanese band), a Taiwanese rock duo
- Kraftwerk (German for power station), a German musical group
- The Power Station Years: The Unreleased Recordings, a 1998 compilation by Jon Bon Jovi
- Power Station (recording studio), a recording studio in New York City
- Powerstation, a 2019 album by British band BBMak

== Other uses ==
- Power Station of Art, a contemporary art museum in Shanghai
- The Power Station (art space), a gallery in Dallas, Texas
- The Power Station (TV channel), a British television channel
- Power station (Utah Transit Authority), a light rail station in Utah
- Nissin Power Station, a music venue in Tokyo, Japan
- Power station

== See also ==
- Power plant (disambiguation)
