= Rolls-Royce Olympus =

Supersonic turbojet engine with afterburner

Olympus
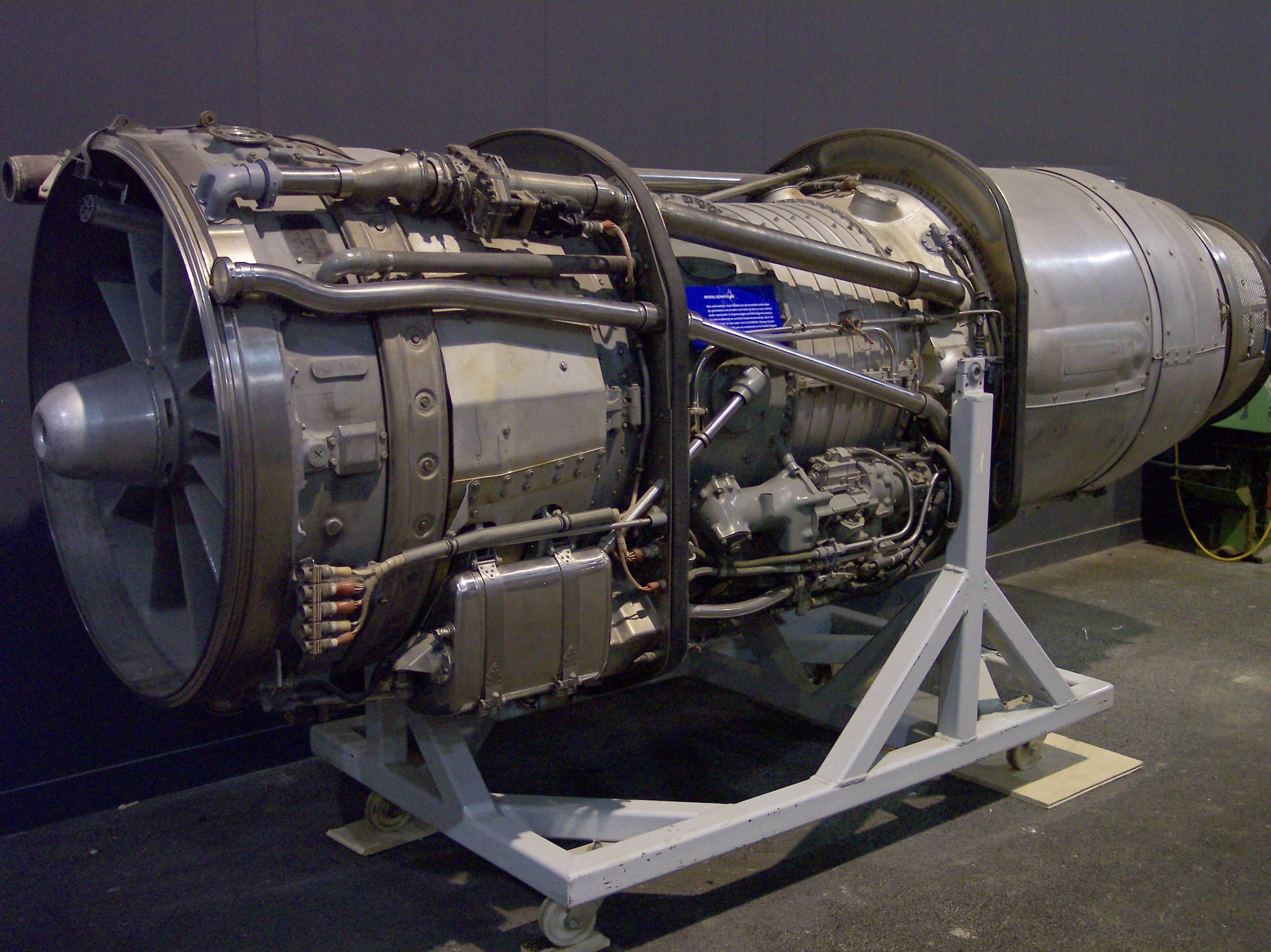
- Preserved Bristol Siddeley Olympus Mk 301 Engine Change Unit (ECU) complete with ancillaries and bulkheads.
- Type: Turbojet
- National origin: United Kingdom
- Manufacturer: Bristol Aero Engines; Bristol Siddeley Engines Limited; Rolls-Royce Bristol Engine Division
- First run: 1950
- Major applications: Avro Vulcan
- Developed into: Rolls-Royce/Snecma Olympus 593; Rolls-Royce Marine Olympus

The Rolls-Royce Olympus (originally the Bristol B.E.10 Olympus) was the world's second two-spool axial-flow turbojet aircraft engine design, first run in May 1950 and preceded only by the Pratt & Whitney J57, first-run in January 1950. It is best known as the powerplant of the Avro Vulcan and later models in the Concorde SST.

The design dates to a November 1946 proposal by Bristol Aeroplane Company for a jet-powered bomber, powered by four new engines which would be supplied by Bristol Aero Engines. Although their bomber design was ultimately cancelled in favour of the other V bombers, the engine design's use of twin-spool layout led to continued interest from the Air Ministry and continued development funding. The engine first ran in 1950 and quickly outperformed its design goals.

The original 100 series engines, of roughly 10,000 lbf (44 kN) thrust, were used in the Vulcan. To compete with the upcoming high-power Rolls-Royce Conway, a redesign resulted in the much more powerful 200 series. The later 300 series added an extra compressor stage to boost airflow and power, and the 320 redesign added reheat for use in the supersonic BAC TSR-2. Bristol Aero Engines merged with Armstrong Siddeley Motors in 1959 to form Bristol Siddeley Engines Limited (BSEL), which in turn was taken over by Rolls-Royce in 1966. Through this period the engine was further developed as the Rolls-Royce/Snecma Olympus 593 for Concorde.

Versions of the engine were licensed to Curtiss-Wright in the US as the TJ-32 or J67 (military designation) and the TJ-38 'Zephyr', although none saw use. The Olympus was also developed with success as marine and industrial gas turbines, which were highly successful. As of 2018, the Olympus remains in service as both a marine and industrial gas turbine.

== Background ==
=== Origins ===
At the end of World War II, the Bristol Engine Company's major effort was the development of the Hercules and Centaurus radial piston engines. By the end of 1946, the company had only 10 hours of turbojet experience with a small experimental engine called the Phoebus which was the gas generator or core of the Proteus turboprop then in development. In early 1947, the parent Bristol Aeroplane Company submitted a proposal for a medium-range bomber to the same specification B.35/46 which led to the Avro Vulcan and Handley Page Victor. The Bristol design was the Type 172 and was to be powered by four or six Bristol engines of 9,000 lbf (40 kN) thrust to the Ministry engine specification TE.1/46.

The thrust required of the new engine, then designated B.E.10 (later Olympus), would initially be 9,000 lbf (40 kN) with growth potential to 12,000 lbf (53 kN). The pressure ratio would be an unheard of 9:1. To achieve this, the initial design used a low-pressure (LP) axial compressor and a high-pressure (HP) centrifugal compressor, each being driven by its own single-stage turbine. This two-spool design eliminated the need for features such as variable inlet guide vanes (Avon, J79), inlet ramps (J65), variable stators (J79) or compressor bleed (Avon) which were required on single spool compressors with pressure ratios above about 6:1. Without these features an engine could not be started nor run at low speeds without destructive blade vibrations. Nor could they accelerate to high speeds with fast acceleration times ("spool up") without surge. The design was progressively modified and the centrifugal HP compressor was replaced by an axial HP compressor. This reduced the diameter of the new engine to the design specification of 40 in (100 cm). The Bristol Type 172 was not selected for development in favour of the Vulcan and Victor, but the engine design was promising enough that development continued to be funded for use on the Vulcan and other projects.

=== Initial development ===
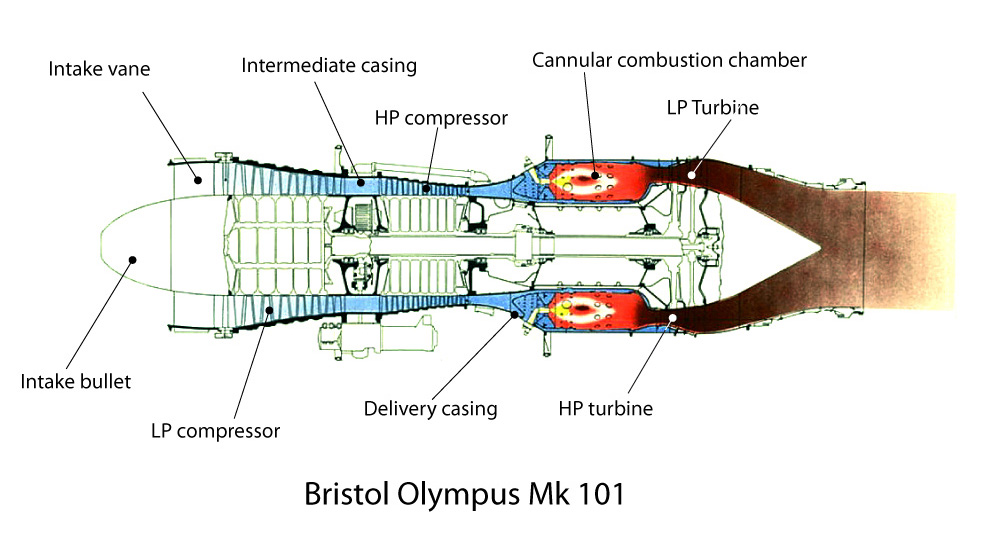
Gas-flow diagram of Olympus Mk 101

The first engine, its development designation being BOl.1 (Bristol Olympus 1), had six LP compressor stages and eight HP stages, each driven by a single-stage turbine. The combustion system was novel in that ten connected flame tubes were housed within a cannular system: a hybrid of separate flame cans and a true annular system. Separate combustion cans would have exceeded the diameter beyond the design limit, and a true annular system was considered too advanced.

In 1950, Dr (later Sir) Stanley Hooker was appointed as Chief Engineer of Bristol Aero Engines.

The BOl.1 first ran on 16 May 1950 and was designed to produce 9,140 lbf (40.7 kN) thrust and to be free from destructive rotating stall on start up to idle speed and to be free from surging on fast accelerations to maximum thrust. The engine started without a problem and Hooker, supervising the first test run and displaying the confidence he had in the design, slammed the throttle to give a surge-free acceleration to maximum power. The thrustmeter showed 10,000 lbf (44 kN). The next development was the BOl.1/2 which produced 9,500 lbf (42 kN) thrust in December 1950. Examples of the similar BOl.1/2A were constructed for US manufacturer Curtiss-Wright which had bought a licence for developing the engine as the TJ-32 or J67 for the projected F-102. The somewhat revised BOl.1/2B, ran in December 1951 producing 9,750 lbf (43.4 kN) thrust.

The engine was by now ready for air testing and the first flight engines, designated Olympus Mk 99, were fitted into a Canberra WD952 which first flew with these engines derated to 8,000 lbf (36 kN) thrust in August 1952. In May 1953, this aircraft reached a world record altitude of 63,668 ft (19,406 m). Fitted with more powerful Mk 102 engines, the Canberra increased the record to 65,876 ft (20,079 m) in August 1955. The first production Olympus, the Mk 101, entered service in late 1952 at a rated thrust of 11,000 lb, a weight of 3,650 lb, and with a time between overhauls (TBO) of 250 hours.

=== 200 series ===
Rolls-Royce had introduced its advanced Conway design in the early 1950s, as the world's first engine to feature bypass, today known as a turbofan. Rolls had a string of bad luck as one aircraft design after another selected the engine as its power plant and was subsequently cancelled. The bad luck finally ended when their 16,500 pounds-force RCo.11 version was selected as the power plant of the later versions of the Handley Page Victor, replacing the earlier model's Armstrong Siddeley Sapphires. The Conway would go on to win a number of civilian orders for airliners as well. Rolls-Royce began to try to convince the Air Ministry that the same engine should be used in later versions of the Vulcan, as it would lower the per-unit cost of the engines as well as simplifying logistics and maintenance.

Faced with the possibility that the only design win for the Olympus might be taken away, the team at Bristol began a major upgrade to the Olympus layout in 1952. The new model, the BOl.6, did not use bypass, instead they changed the arrangement of the compressor stages, reducing the high-pressure and low-pressure sections by one stage each, but increasing airflow. The result was a design that was almost identical in size and weight as the original versions, but increasing the power to 16,000 pounds-force to complete with the Conway. Their efforts were successful, and the slightly modified BOl.7, known in the RAF as the Olympus Mk. 202, became the definitive engine on the Vulcan.

=== 300 series ===
The BOl.7 was originally designed for the thin-wing Javelin interceptor aircraft project, in which case it would also feature reheat. As the Javelin design process continued, Bristol offered a series of further updates to this design to provide more thrust as the weight of the aircraft increased. The ultimate end of this series of developments was the BOl.21, which added a "zero stage" to the low-pressure compressor and further increased airflow to offer 21,000 dry and 28,000 lbf in full reheat.

This development process ended in 1956 when the Javelin project was cancelled. Although the aircraft was cancelled, Bristol convinced the RAF to use the new engine as the basis for a further upgrade for the Vulcan fleet. Lacking reheat, the resulting Olympus Mk. 301s were fitted to all of the later production Vulcans as well as a small number of earlier models that were upgraded. These were later de-rated in service to 18,000 lbf, although this was increased to the original power for the Black Buck missions.

In 1962, Bristol won the contest to power the TSR.2, and responded with BOl.22, or as the RAF referred to it, the Mk. 320. This was a further modification to the 301, slightly reducing rated dry thrust to 19,610 lbf, but offering a new reheat design that increased wet power to 30,610 lbf. Even the initial versions managed to beat these ratings, although development was not entirely smooth and the engine was de-rated when fit to the prototype aircraft. All of this work came to nothing when the TSR.2 project was cancelled in 1965.

== Variants ==
For Concorde, this was developed during the 1960s into the Rolls-Royce/Snecma Olympus 593, being further developed through several subsequent versions to eventually provide reliable airline service. The Olympus 593 is a prime example of "propulsion and airframe integration". To optimise the performance of the engine when used at speeds from takeoff up to Mach 2 on Concorde, a variable intake and a variable throat nozzle with thrust reversing system were developed. Looking ahead to future supersonic transports, due to noise limits for supersonic transport category airplanes, studies were conducted on ejector suppressors, leading to the conclusion that "a new, low bypass ratio version of the 593 could be suitable for future generations of supersonic transport aircraft".

The American Curtiss-Wright company tested a license-developed version known as the J67 and a turboprop designated TJ-38 Zephyr. Neither design was produced.

Further derivatives of the Olympus were produced for ship propulsion and land-based power generation.

== Applications ==
- Avro Vulcan
- BAC TSR-2

=== Proposed aircraft applications ===
Over the years, the Olympus was proposed for numerous other applications including:

- C104 which led to the C105 Avro Arrow: BOl.3"
- Avro 718: BOl.3 The Type 718 was a military transport aircraft with up to 110 seats.
- Avro 739 to OR339 (the requirement that culminated in TSR2): BOl.21R
- Avro 740: 3 x Mk 551
- Avro 750: 2 x Mk 551
- Avro Vulcan Phase 6 (B3): BOl.23, a development of the Mk 301. Different engine configurations, BOl.21, BOl.21/2 and BOl.23, with either reheat or an aft fan, were proposed for this aircraft to provide the required increase in take-off thrust.
- Bristol T172: B.E.10
- Bristol T177
- Bristol T180
- Bristol T198: Mk 591. Early supersonic airliner design (132 seats). The engine was a civilianised BOl.22R.
- Bristol T201: Mk 551
- Bristol T202
- Bristol T204 to OR339: BOl.22SR (simplified reheat)
- Bristol T205: Mark 551
- Bristol T213
- Bristol T223: Mk 593. Later supersonic airliner design (100 seats). Engine as Mk 591 with zero stage LP compressor and cooled HP turbine.
- de Havilland design to OR339: BOl.14R, BOl.15R. Developed from BOl.6R.
- Handley Page HP98: Pathfinder variant of Victor.
- Handley Page Victor B1: Mk 104
- Handley Page Victor Phase 3
- Handley Page HP107
- Handley Page Pacific
- Hawker P.1121: BOl.21R
- Hawker P.1129 to OR339: BOl.15R
- Martin/General Dynamics RB-57F Canberra: Mk 701 developed from Mk 301.
- Gloster P492/3: Mk 591
- Republic XF-103
- Republic F-105 Thunderchief: BOl.21 for possible sale to RAF.
- Saab 36
- Saab 37 Viggen
- Vickers VC10: Development of Mk 555 with aft fan.

== Engines on display ==
- Imperial War Museum North, Manchester – Mk 101
- Royal Air Force Museum Midlands – Mk 320
- Gatwick Aviation Museum Charlwood Surrey – Two Mk 320
- The Rolls-Royce Heritage Trust Collection (Derby - UK) Mk 101 and Mk 593 and a Marine version.
- Museum of Science and Industry (Manchester) – Mk 202 (Engine is displayed as a Mk 201 but its ECU plate reveals it as a Mk 202)
- South Yorkshire Aircraft Museum, Doncaster, England - Mk.104 on loan from the Rolls-Royce Heritage Trust.

== Specifications (Olympus 101) ==
Data from "The Operational Olympus". Flight. Archived from the original on 29 July 2013. and Lecture Notes, Vulcan Bristol Aero Engine School

==== General characteristics ====
- Type: axial flow two-spool turbojet
- Length: 127.1 in (10.59 ft; 3.23 m)
- Diameter: 40 in (3.3 ft; 1.0 m)
- Dry weight: 3,615 lb (1,640 kg)

==== Components ====
- Compressor: axial 6 LP stages, 8 HP stages
- Combustors: cannular 10 flame tubes
- Turbine: HP single stage, LP single stage
- Fuel type: AVTUR or AVTAG

==== Performance ====
- Maximum thrust: 11,000 lbf (49 kN)
- Specific fuel consumption: 0.817 lb/(lbf⋅h) (23.1 g/(kN⋅s))
- Thrust-to-weight ratio: 3.04

== See also ==
Related development

- Bristol Siddeley BS100 (Olympus core)
- Rolls-Royce Marine Olympus
- Rolls-Royce/Snecma Olympus 593

Comparable engines

- Pratt & Whitney J75

Related lists

- List of aircraft engines
