= Power plant (disambiguation) =

Power plant or Powerplant may refer to:

== Power generation ==
- A power station, a facility for the generation of electrical power
- An engine and related systems that propel a vehicle
- An aircraft engine and its propeller, constituting an entire propulsion system (usually used in countries other than the U.S.)

== Music ==
- Power Plant (Gamma Ray album), released in 1999
- Power Plant (Golden Dawn album), released in 1968
- Powerplant (album), by Girlpool, released in 2017

== Other ==
- PowerPlant, an object-oriented application framework for the Mac OS by Metrowerks
- The Power Plant, a contemporary art gallery located in Toronto
- Power Plant Live!, a club near Baltimore's Inner Harbor
- Power Plant Mall, a shopping mall in Makati, Philippines
- WCW Power Plant, professional wrestling school (1989-2001)

== See also ==
- Power station (disambiguation)
