= Anker SOLIX =

Home energy company based in China

Anker SOLIX is a brand of Anker Innovations for home energy systems, portable power stations, and solar generators.

== History ==
The product line originated from the "PowerHouse" series, introduced in 2016. In June 2023, Anker Innovations consolidated its energy-related products under the Anker SOLIX brand, introducing the Solarbank E1600 balcony system and the SOLIX F3800 portable power station; the F3800 campaign was reported at over US$5 million in crowdfunding. In 2026, Anker launched the E10 whole-home backup system and the S series (Anker SOLIX S2000 and Anker SOLIX S5000, powered by OptiSave™ 2.0) in the U.S. market.

== Products ==
The SOLIX line includes modular residential energy-storage systems, portable power stations, and balcony-solar products. Portable models in the line include the F3800 and S5000, which have been discussed for home-backup use cases. In 2025, KrASIA described the SOLIX line as part of Anker's broader shift from portable power products toward home energy storage. The SOLIX X1 home energy-storage unit has received a Red Dot Design Award.

== Product safety ==
In July 2023, Anker SOLIX halted sales and distribution of the MI60 microinverter for balcony-solar systems in Germany over local safety-compliance issues, and offered an exchange to the MI80 model.
