= Bristol Phoebus =

The Bristol Phoebus was an early turbojet engine developed by Bristol Engines. It was based on the gas generator core of the Bristol Proteus. The Phoebus was used for development but only a handful were made. As with other Bristol engines, it took its name from classical mythology.

== Origins ==
Bristol avoided gas turbine development work at first, as Roy Fedden considered that Bristol's limited wartime resources were already occupied with the enlarged generation of sleeve valve radial engines such as the Hercules and Centaurus then under development and that a useful turbojet engine was at least ten years away. This policy changed under Frank Owner and this became one of the reasons behind Fedden's falling out with Bristol and his departure from them in 1942.

Bristol began gas turbine design work with Owner's 1943 proposal for a 4,000 hp (3,000 kW) turboprop, which became the more modest 2,000 hp (1,500 kW) Theseus. Although the Theseus was manufactured, developed, type tested and actually flew, it never entered service.

Given Bristol's experience with large radials for heavy transport aircraft, they chose to address the same applications for their first turbine engines, thus chose turboprops rather than the turbojets for fast fighters which all the other manufacturers were developing. In late 1944 work began on another turboprop, the Proteus.

For the Bristol Type 172 fast jet bomber and also with an eye to post-war developments and the likelihood of jet travel in fast airliners, Bristol had considered the need for a suitable pure turbojet engine. This B.E.10 engine, which would eventually become the Olympus, began as initial concepts in 1946. Bristol recognised that their lack so far of experience with pure-jet engines could be overcome by developing the core of the Proteus, the compressor, combustion chambers and first turbine, as a stand-alone jet engine. In hindsight, the Phoebus compressor also gave valuable lessons for the design of the Proteus.

== Development ==
Existence of the Pheobus I [sic] and Proteus had been announced to the public by 4 September 1947, although no details were made available. Details of the Proteus, and its relation to the Phoebus, did not appear until 1948, and full details not for two years.

To achieve the high design power of the Proteus it was designed with a high overall pressure ratio, using both axial and centrifugal compressors. A twelve stage axial compressor was followed by two centrifugal stages. Despite the widely-admired Theseus installation in the Hermes V and its four petal nacelle with good access for maintenance, the Proteus I was designed to be buried deep within the wing of the Bristol Brabazon or the Saunders-Roe Princess, leading to its unusual reverse-flow layout, with two 180 degree turns in direction. The wing leading edge air inlets would feed air to the rear of the engine, forwards through the compressors, around an internal elbow and then rearwards again through the combustors and turbines. The Proteus was an early free-turbine turboshaft, with separate turbines to drive the compressor and propeller. As a turbojet, the Phoebus did not require the second turbine and the first turbine could be used almost unchanged to produce the simpler jet engine. To achieve the design power needed for the Proteus, a mass-airflow rate of 40 lb/s (18 kg/s) at 10,000 rpm was required, with an overall pressure ratio of 9. This was anticipated to give the Phoebus a thrust of 2,540 lbf (11.3 kN).

The Phoebus made its first flight in February 1949. An Avro Lincoln, RA643, was used, with the engine installed in the bomb bay. Two air inlet elbows were provided at the sides of the bomb bay, with the jet exhaust angled steeply downwards. As the Phoebus used the same reverse-flow layout as the first Proteus, inlets from the side were appropriate.

Initial performance of both the Phoebus and Proteus was poor. A difficulty first encountered with the Phoebus was with the first centrifugal compressor stage. Airflow through it was so poor, owing to a mismatch with the axial compressor, that its effect was to reduce airflow, rather than compressing it. Production engines abandoned this first stage compressor in favour of a better designed diffuser passage which recovered the mass flow, at the cost of dropping the pressure ratio to 5.35.

One of the first tasks for Stanley Hooker, who came to Bristol from Rolls-Royce in Derby at the start of 1949, was to rework the Proteus. The work to totally redesign the Proteus 2 would be so substantial, and take so long, that the Phoebus became an irrelevance: no longer comparable as a prototype, and not worth redesigning to match the new turboprop. Nor did it show any promise for development as a turbojet in its own right, as Hooker was working on the BE.10, later to become the Olympus, which, unlike the troublesome Proteus, was a powerful and reliable success from the outset.

Development of the Phoebus had ceased by 1953, after a cost of £600,000.
