= Power station =

Facility generating electric power

A power station, also referred to as a power plant and sometimes generating station or generating plant, is an industrial facility for the generation of electric power. Power stations are generally connected to an electrical grid. Many power stations contain one or more generators, rotating machines that convert mechanical power into three-phase electric power. The relative motion between a magnetic field and a conductor creates an electric current.

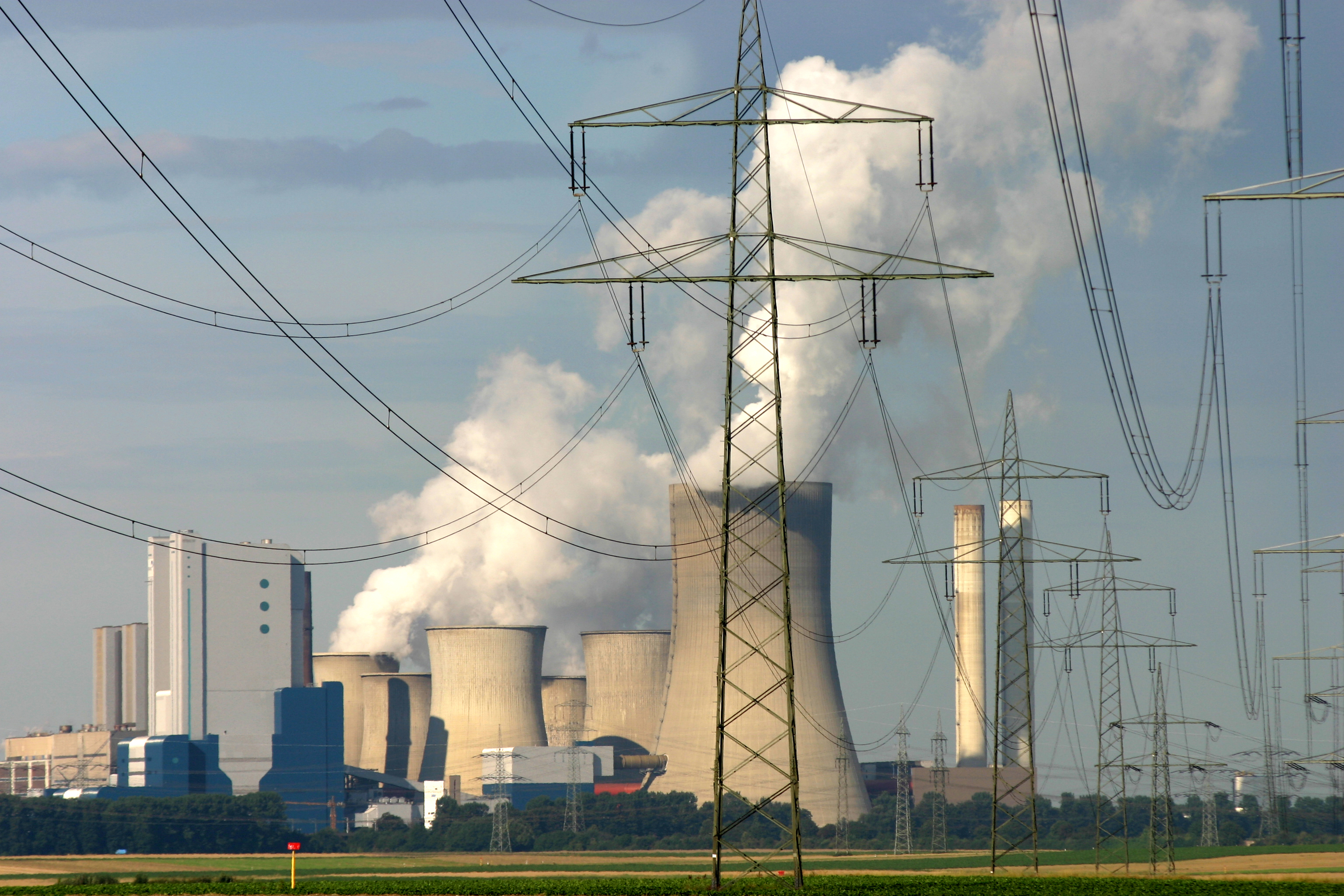
The Niederaussem Power Station is the largest coal power plant in Germany.

The energy source harnessed to turn the generator varies widely. Most power stations in the world burn fossil fuels such as coal, oil, and natural gas to generate electricity. Low-carbon power sources include nuclear power, and use of renewables such as solar, wind, geothermal, and hydroelectric.

== History ==
In early 1871 Belgian inventor Zénobe Gramme invented a generator powerful enough to produce power on a commercial scale for industry.

In 1878, a hydroelectric power station was designed and built by William, Lord Armstrong at Cragside, England. It used water from lakes on his estate to power Siemens dynamos. The electricity supplied power to lights and heating, produced hot water, ran an elevator as well as labor-saving devices and farm buildings.

In January 1882 the world's first public coal-fired power station, the Edison Electric Light Station, was built in London, a project of Thomas Edison organized by Edward Johnson. A Babcock & Wilcox boiler powered a 93 kW (125 horsepower) steam engine that drove a 27-tonne (27-long-ton) generator. This supplied electricity to premises in the area that could be reached through the culverts of the viaduct without digging up the road, which was the monopoly of the gas companies. The customers included the City Temple and the Old Bailey. Another important customer was the Telegraph Office of the General Post Office, but this could not be reached through the culverts. Johnson arranged for the supply cable to be run overhead, via Holborn Tavern and Newgate.

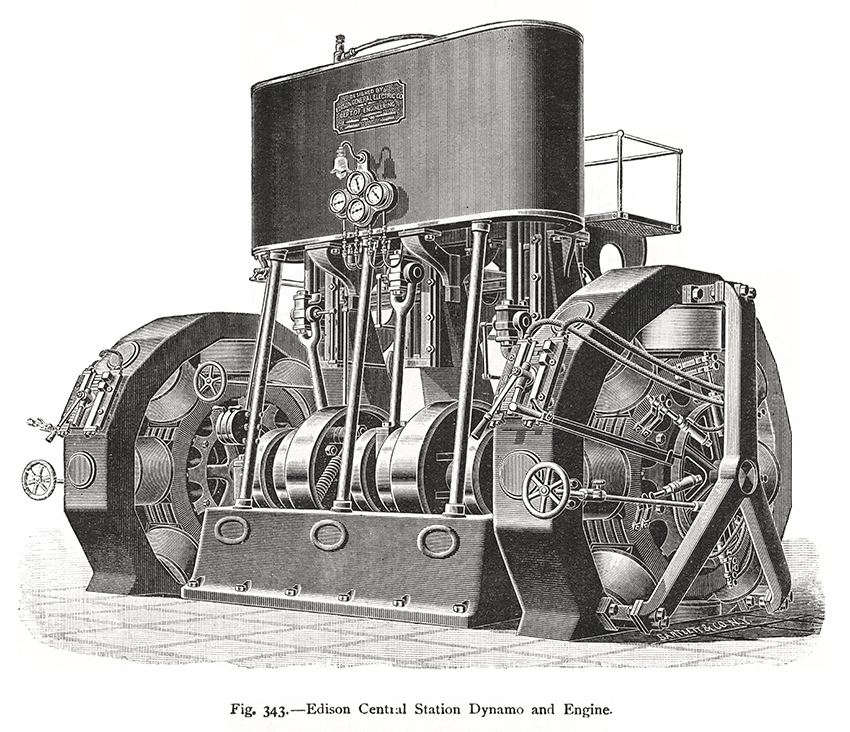
Dynamos and engine installed at Edison General Electric Company, New York 1895

In September 1882 in New York, the Pearl Street Station was established by Edison to provide electric lighting in the lower Manhattan Island area. The station ran until destroyed by fire in 1890. The station used reciprocating steam engines to turn direct-current generators. Because of the DC distribution, the service area was small, limited by voltage drop in the feeders. In 1886 George Westinghouse began building an alternating current system that used a transformer to step up voltage for long-distance transmission and then stepped it back down for indoor lighting, a more efficient and less expensive system similar to modern systems. The war of the currents eventually resolved in favor of AC distribution and utilization, although some DC systems persisted to the end of the 20th century. DC systems with a service radius of a mile (kilometer) or so were necessarily smaller, less efficient of fuel consumption, and more labor-intensive to operate than much larger central AC generating stations.

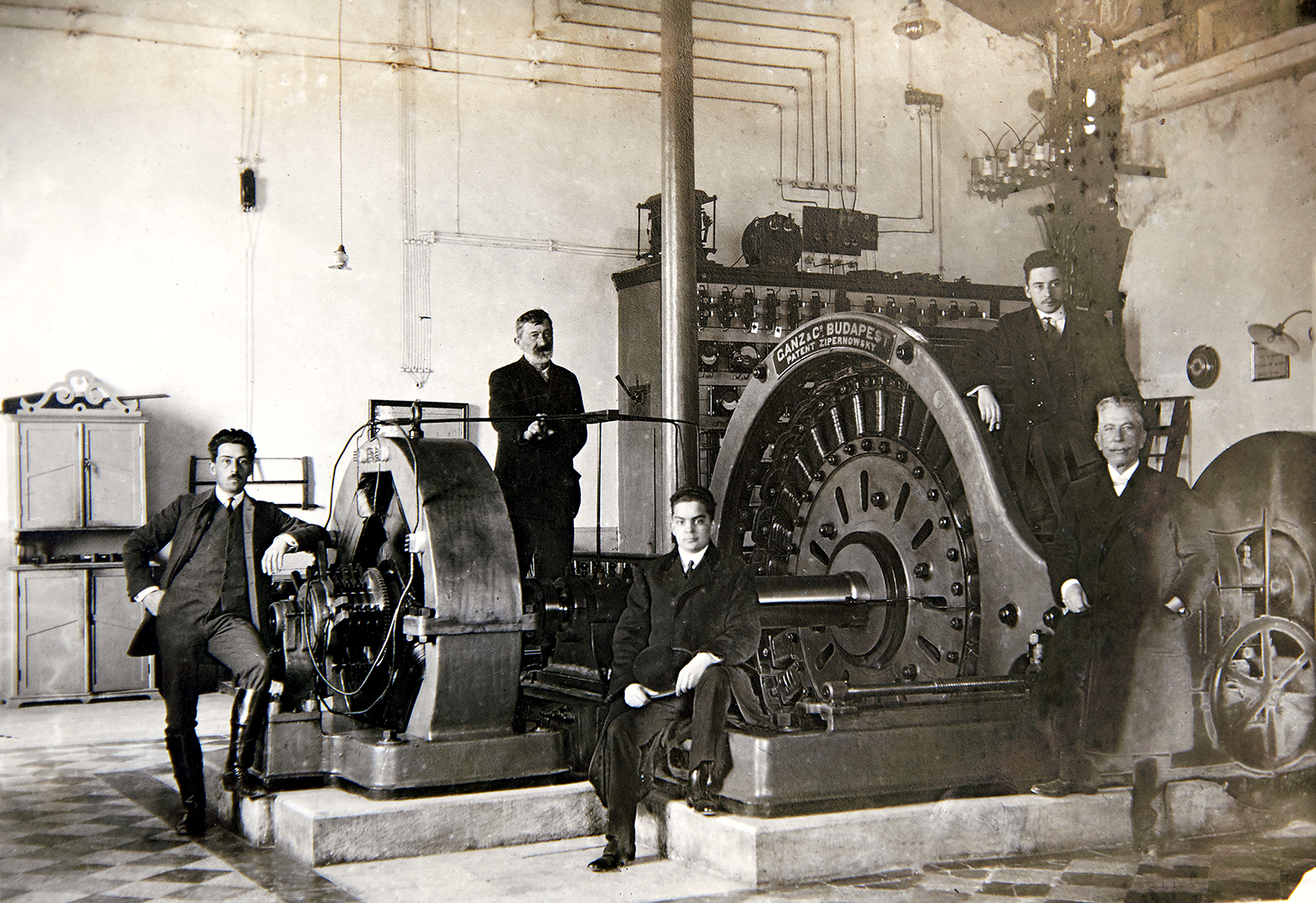
The generator room of the Krka hydroelectric plant (1895), with one of the first polyphase AC distribution systems in the world

AC systems used a wide range of frequencies depending on the type of load; lighting loads used higher frequencies, and traction systems and heavy motor load systems preferred lower frequencies. The economics of central station generation improved greatly when unified light and power systems operating at a common frequency were developed. The same generating plant that fed large industrial loads during the day could feed commuter railway systems during rush hour and then serve lighting load in the evening, thus improving the system load factor and reducing the cost of electrical energy overall. Many exceptions existed; generating stations were dedicated to power or light by the choice of frequency, and rotating frequency changers and rotating converters were particularly common to feed electric railway systems from the general lighting and power network.

Throughout the first few decades of the 20th century central stations became larger, using higher steam pressures to provide greater efficiency, and relying on interconnections of multiple generating stations to improve reliability and cost. High-voltage AC transmission allowed hydroelectric power to be conveniently moved from distant waterfalls to city markets. The advent of the steam turbine in central station service around 1906 allowed great expansion of generating capacity. Generators were no longer limited by the power transmission of belts or the relatively slow speed of reciprocating engines, and could grow to enormous sizes. For example, Sebastian Ziani de Ferranti planned what would have become the largest reciprocating steam engine ever built for a proposed new central station, but scrapped the plans when turbines became available in the necessary size. Building power systems out of central stations required a combination of engineering skill and financial acumen in equal measure. Pioneers of central station generation include George Westinghouse and Samuel Insull in the United States, Ferranti and Charles Hesterman Merz in the UK, and many others.

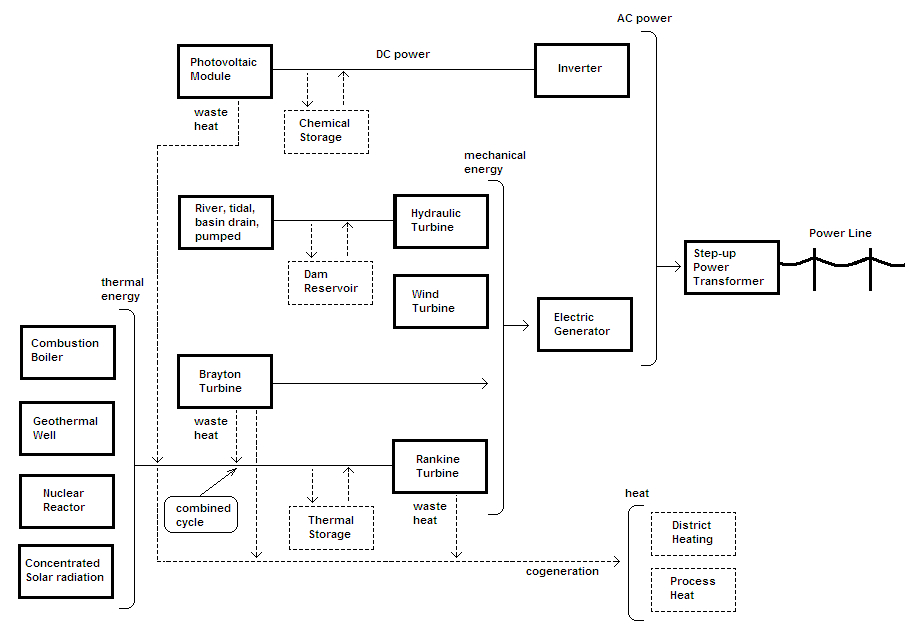
Modular block overview of many types of power stations. Dashed lines show special additions like combined cycle and cogeneration or optional storage.

== Thermal power stations ==
2024 world electricity generation by source in terawatt-hours (TWh). Total generation was 30.85 petawatt-hours.
1. Coal 10,587 (34.4%)
2. Natural gas 6,796 (22.1%)
3. Hydro 4,417 (14.4%)
4. Nuclear 2,765 (8.99%)
5. Wind 2,497 (8.12%)
6. Solar 2,130 (6.92%)
7. Other 1,569 (5.10%)

In thermal power stations, mechanical power is produced by a heat engine that transforms thermal energy, often from combustion of a fuel, into rotational energy. Most thermal power stations produce steam, so they are sometimes called steam power stations. Not all thermal energy can be transformed into mechanical power, according to the second law of thermodynamics; therefore, there is always heat lost to the environment. If this loss is employed as useful heat, for industrial processes or district heating, the power plant is referred to as a cogeneration power plant or CHP (combined heat-and-power) plant. In countries where district heating is common, there are dedicated heat plants called heat-only boiler stations. An important class of power stations in the Middle East uses by-product heat for the desalination of water.

The efficiency of a thermal power cycle is limited by the maximum working fluid temperature produced. The efficiency is not directly a function of the fuel used. For the same steam conditions, coal-, nuclear- and gas power plants all have the same theoretical efficiency. Overall, if a system is on constantly (base load) it will be more efficient than one that is used intermittently (peak load). Steam turbines generally operate at higher efficiency when operated at full capacity.

Besides using reject heat for process or district heating, one way to improve the overall efficiency of a power plant is to combine two different thermodynamic cycles in a combined cycle plant. Most commonly, exhaust gases from a gas turbine are used to generate steam for a boiler and a steam turbine. The combination of a "top" cycle and a "bottom" cycle produces higher overall efficiency than either cycle can attain alone.

In 2018, Inter RAO UES and State Grid planned to build an 8-GW thermal power plant, which is the largest coal-fired power plant construction project in Russia.

=== Classification ===
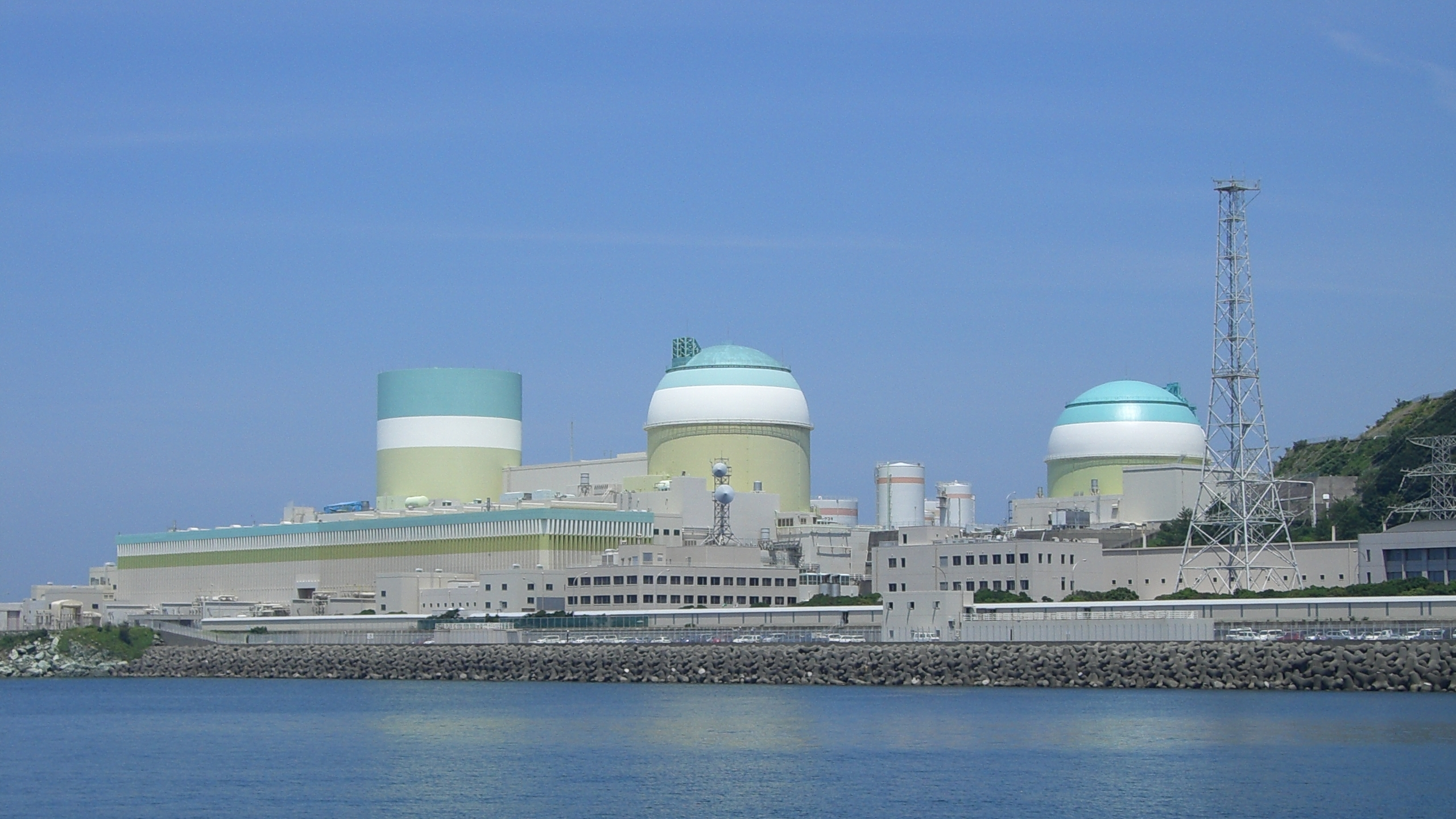
Ikata Nuclear Power Plant, Japan

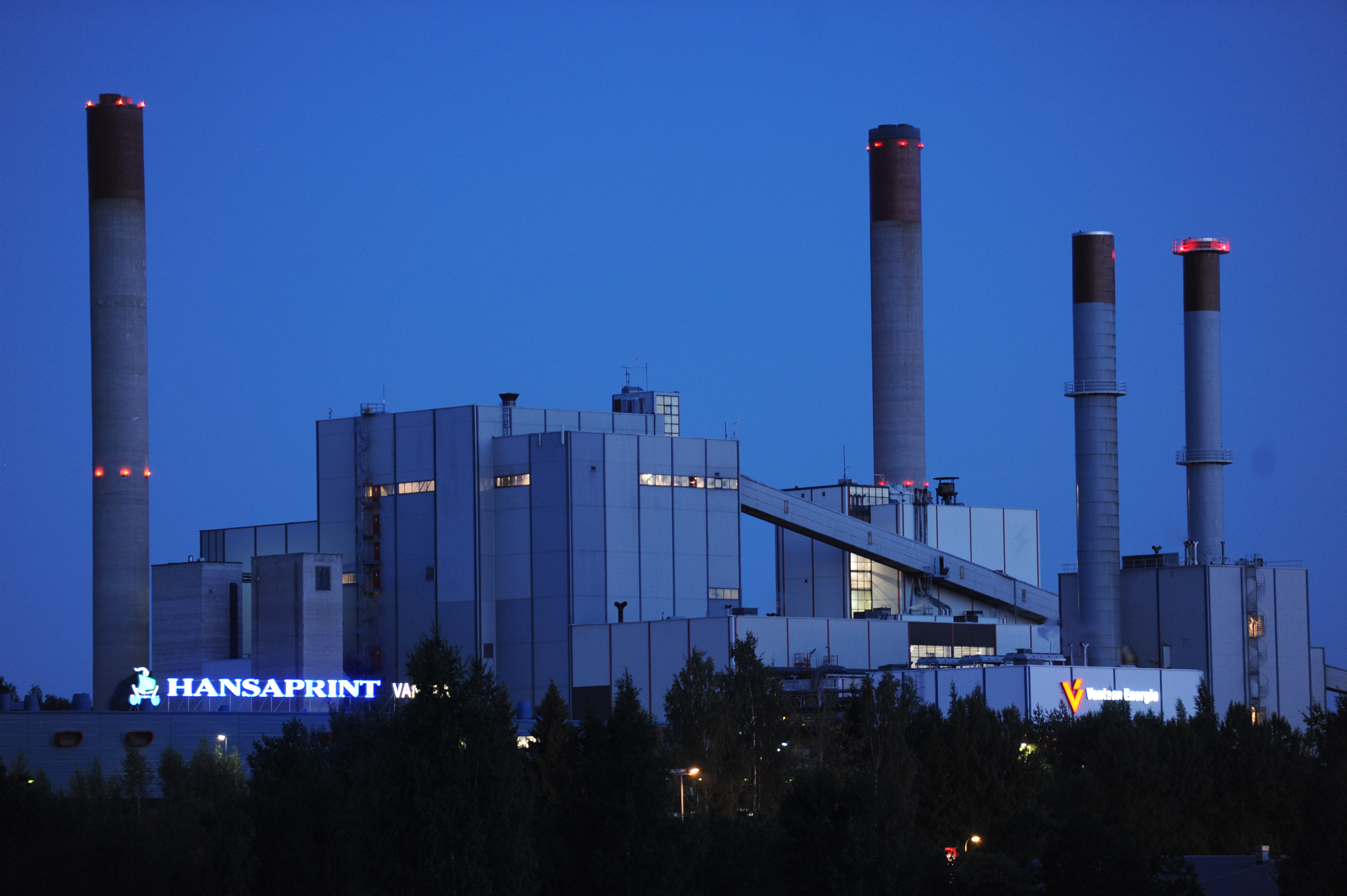
A large gas and coal power plant in Martinlaakso, Vantaa, Finland

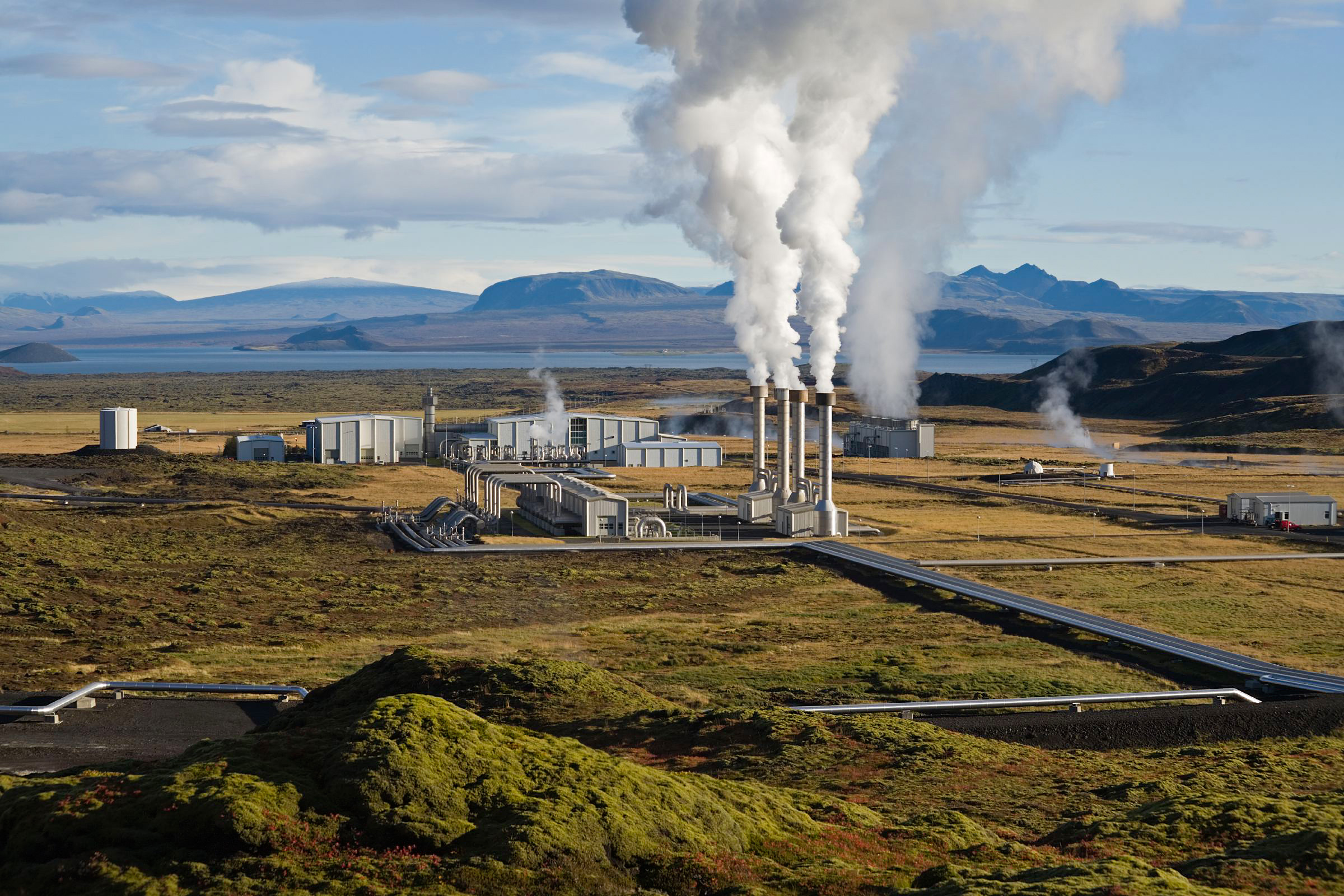
Nesjavellir Geothermal Power Station, Iceland

==== By heat source ====
- Fossil-fuel power stations may also use a steam turbine generator or in the case of natural gas-fired power plants may use a combustion turbine. A coal-fired power station produces heat by burning coal in a steam boiler. The steam drives a steam turbine and generator that then produces electricity. The waste products of combustion include ash, sulfur dioxide, nitrogen oxides, and carbon dioxide. Some of the gases can be removed from the waste stream to reduce pollution.
- Nuclear power plants use the heat generated in a nuclear reactor's core (by the fission process) to create steam which then operates a steam turbine and generator. About 20 percent of electric generation in the US is produced by nuclear power plants.
- Geothermal power plants use steam extracted from hot underground rocks. These rocks are heated by the decay of radioactive material in the Earth's core.
- Biomass-fuelled power plants may be fuelled by waste from sugar cane, municipal solid waste, landfill methane, or other forms of biomass.
- In integrated steel mills, blast furnace exhaust gas is a low-cost, although low-energy-density, fuel.
- Waste heat from industrial processes is occasionally concentrated enough to use for power generation, usually in a steam boiler and turbine.
- Solar thermal electric plants use sunlight to boil water and produce steam which turns the generator.
- Hydrogen power plants can use green hydrogen from electrolysis to help balance supply and demand from Variable renewable energy sources.

==== By prime mover ====
A prime mover is a machine that converts energy of various forms into energy of motion.

- Steam turbine plants use the dynamic pressure generated by expanding steam to turn the blades of a turbine. Almost all large non-hydro plants use this system. About 90 percent of all electric power produced in the world is through the use of steam turbines.
- Gas turbine plants use the dynamic pressure from flowing gases (air and combustion products) to directly operate the turbine. Natural-gas-fuelled (and oil-fuelled) combustion turbine plants can start rapidly and so are used to supply "peak" energy during periods of high demand, though at higher cost than base-loaded plants. These may be comparatively small units, and sometimes completely unmanned, being remotely operated. This type was pioneered by the UK, Princetown being the world's first, commissioned in 1959.
- Combined cycle plants have both a gas turbine fired by natural gas, and a steam boiler and steam turbine which use the hot exhaust gas from the gas turbine to produce electricity. This greatly increases the overall efficiency of the plant, and many new baseload power plants are combined cycle plants fired by natural gas.
- Internal combustion reciprocating engines are used to provide power for isolated communities and are frequently used for small cogeneration plants. Hospitals, office buildings, industrial plants, and other critical facilities also use them to provide backup power in case of a power outage. These are usually fuelled by diesel oil, heavy oil, natural gas, and landfill gas.
- Microturbines, Stirling engine and internal combustion reciprocating engines are low-cost solutions for using opportunity fuels, such as landfill gas, digester gas from water treatment plants and waste gas from oil production.

==== By duty ====
Power plants that can be dispatched (scheduled) to provide energy to a system include:

- Base load power plants run nearly continually to provide that component of system load that does not vary during a day or week. Baseload plants can be highly optimized for low fuel cost, but may not start or stop quickly during changes in system load. Examples of base-load plants would include large modern coal-fired and nuclear generating stations, or hydro plants with a predictable supply of water.
- Peaking power plants meet the daily peak load, which may only be for one or two hours each day. While their incremental operating cost is always higher than base load plants, they are required to ensure security of the system during load peaks. Peaking plants include simple cycle gas turbines and reciprocating internal combustion engines, which can be started up rapidly when system peaks are predicted. Hydroelectric plants may also be designed for peaking use.
- Load following power plants can economically follow the variations in the daily and weekly load, at lower cost than peaking plants and with more flexibility than baseload plants.

Non-dispatchable plants include sources such as wind and solar energy; while their long-term contribution to system energy supply is predictable, on a short-term (daily or hourly) basis their energy must be used as available since generation cannot be deferred. Contractual arrangements ("take or pay") with independent power producers or system interconnections to other networks may be effectively non-dispatchable.

=== Cooling towers ===
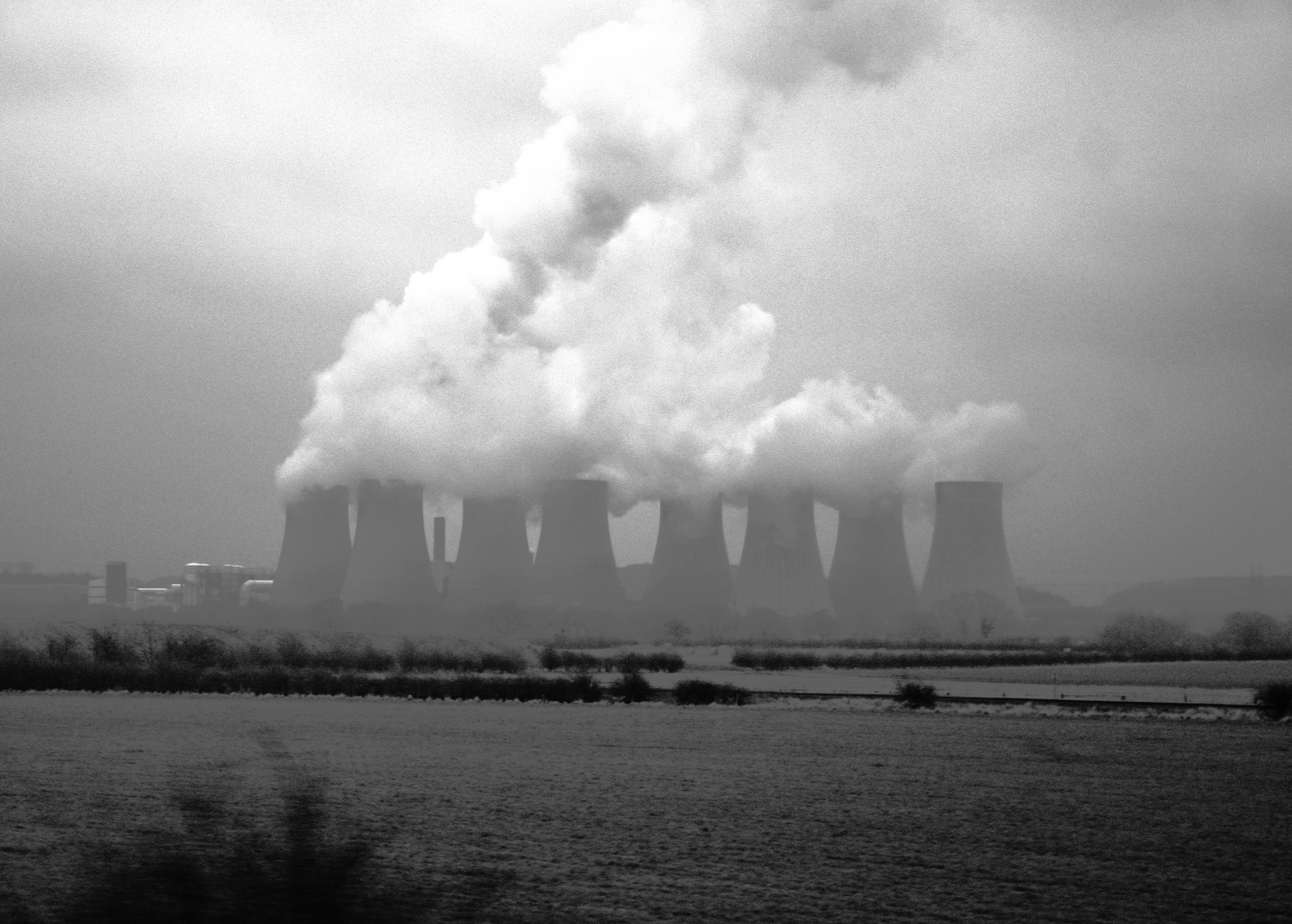
Cooling towers showing evaporating water at Ratcliffe-on-Soar Power Station, United Kingdom

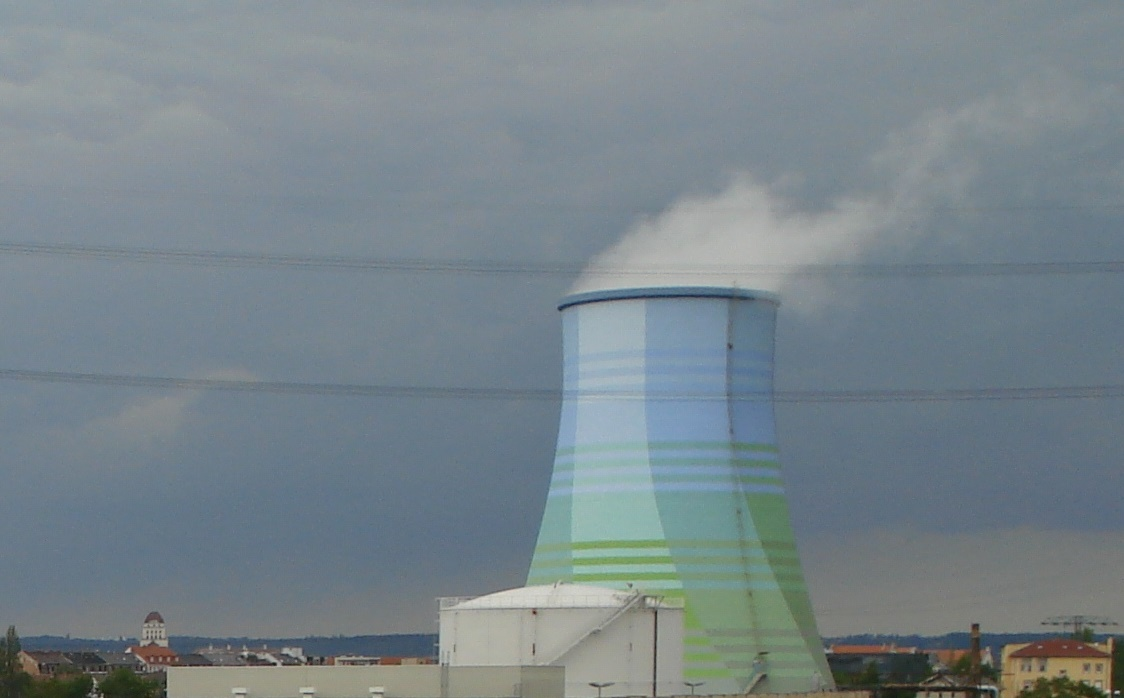
"Camouflaged" natural draft wet cooling tower

All thermal power plants produce waste heat energy as a byproduct of the useful electrical energy produced. The amount of waste heat energy equals or exceeds the amount of energy converted into useful electricity. Gas-fired power plants can achieve as much as 65% conversion efficiency, while coal and oil plants achieve around 30–49%. The waste heat produces a temperature rise in the atmosphere, which is small compared to that produced by greenhouse-gas emissions from the same power plant. Natural draft wet cooling towers at many nuclear power plants and large fossil-fuel-fired power plants use large hyperboloid chimney-like structures (as seen in the image at the right) that release the waste heat to the ambient atmosphere by the evaporation of water.

However, the mechanical induced-draft or forced-draft wet cooling towers in many large thermal power plants, nuclear power plants, fossil-fired power plants, petroleum refineries, petrochemical plants, geothermal, biomass and waste-to-energy plants use fans to provide air movement upward through down coming water and are not hyperboloid chimney-like structures. The induced or forced-draft cooling towers are typically rectangular, box-like structures filled with a material that enhances the mixing of the upflowing air and the down-flowing water.

In areas with restricted water use, a dry cooling tower or directly air-cooled radiators may be necessary, since the cost or environmental consequences of obtaining make-up water for evaporative cooling would be prohibitive. These coolers have lower efficiency and higher energy consumption to drive fans, compared to a typical wet, evaporative cooling tower.

=== Air-cooled condenser (ACC) ===
Power plants can use an air-cooled condenser, traditionally in areas with a limited or expensive water supply. Air-cooled condensers serve the same purpose as a cooling tower (heat dissipation) without using water. They consume additional auxiliary power and thus may have a higher carbon footprint compared to a traditional cooling tower.

=== Once-through cooling systems ===
Electric companies often prefer to use cooling water from the ocean or a lake, river, or cooling pond instead of a cooling tower. This single-pass or once-through cooling system can save the cost of a cooling tower and may have lower energy costs for pumping cooling water through the plant's heat exchangers. However, the waste heat can cause thermal pollution as the water is discharged. Power plants that use natural bodies of water for cooling are designed with mechanisms such as fish screens to limit intake of organisms into the cooling machinery. These screens are only partially effective and as a result billions of fish and other aquatic organisms are killed by power plants each year. For example, the cooling system at the Indian Point Energy Center in New York kills over a billion fish eggs and larvae annually. A further environmental impact is that aquatic organisms which adapt to the warmer discharge water may be injured if the plant shuts down in cold weather.

Water consumption by power stations is a developing issue.

In recent years, recycled wastewater, or grey water, has been used in cooling towers. The Calpine Riverside and the Calpine Fox power stations in Wisconsin as well as the Calpine Mankato power station in Minnesota are among these facilities.

== Power from renewable energy ==
Power stations can generate electrical energy from renewable energy sources.

=== Hydroelectric power station ===
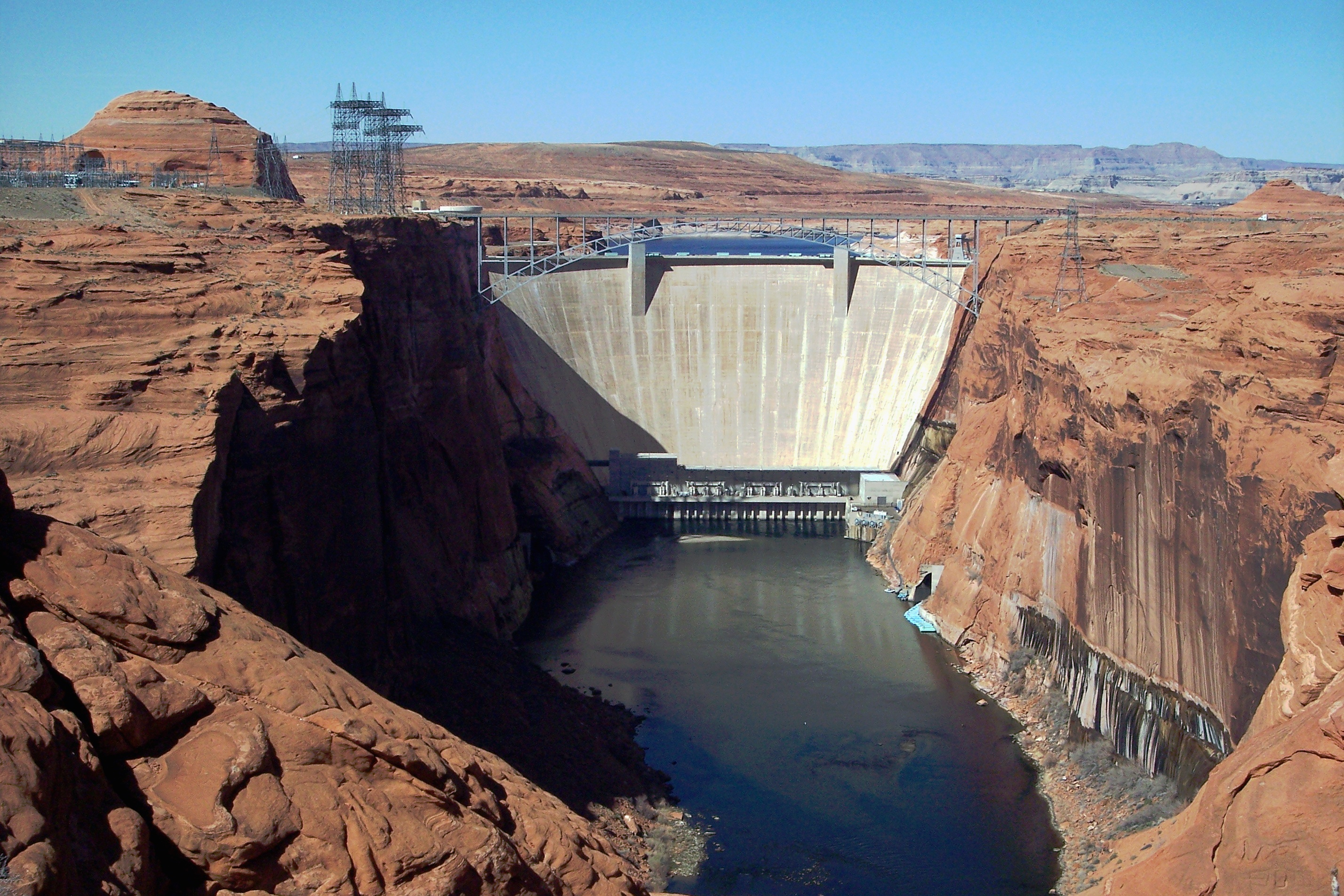
Hydroelectric power station at Glen Canyon Dam, Page, Arizona

In a hydroelectric power station water flows through turbines using hydropower to generate hydroelectricity. Power is captured from the gravitational force of water falling through penstocks to water turbines connected to generators. The amount of power available is a combination of height and water flow. A wide range of Dams may be built to raise the water level and create a lake for storing water. Hydropower is produced in 150 countries, with the Asia-Pacific region generating 32 percent of global hydropower in 2010. China is the largest hydroelectricity producer, with 721 terawatt-hours of production in 2010, representing around 17 percent of domestic electricity use.

=== Solar ===
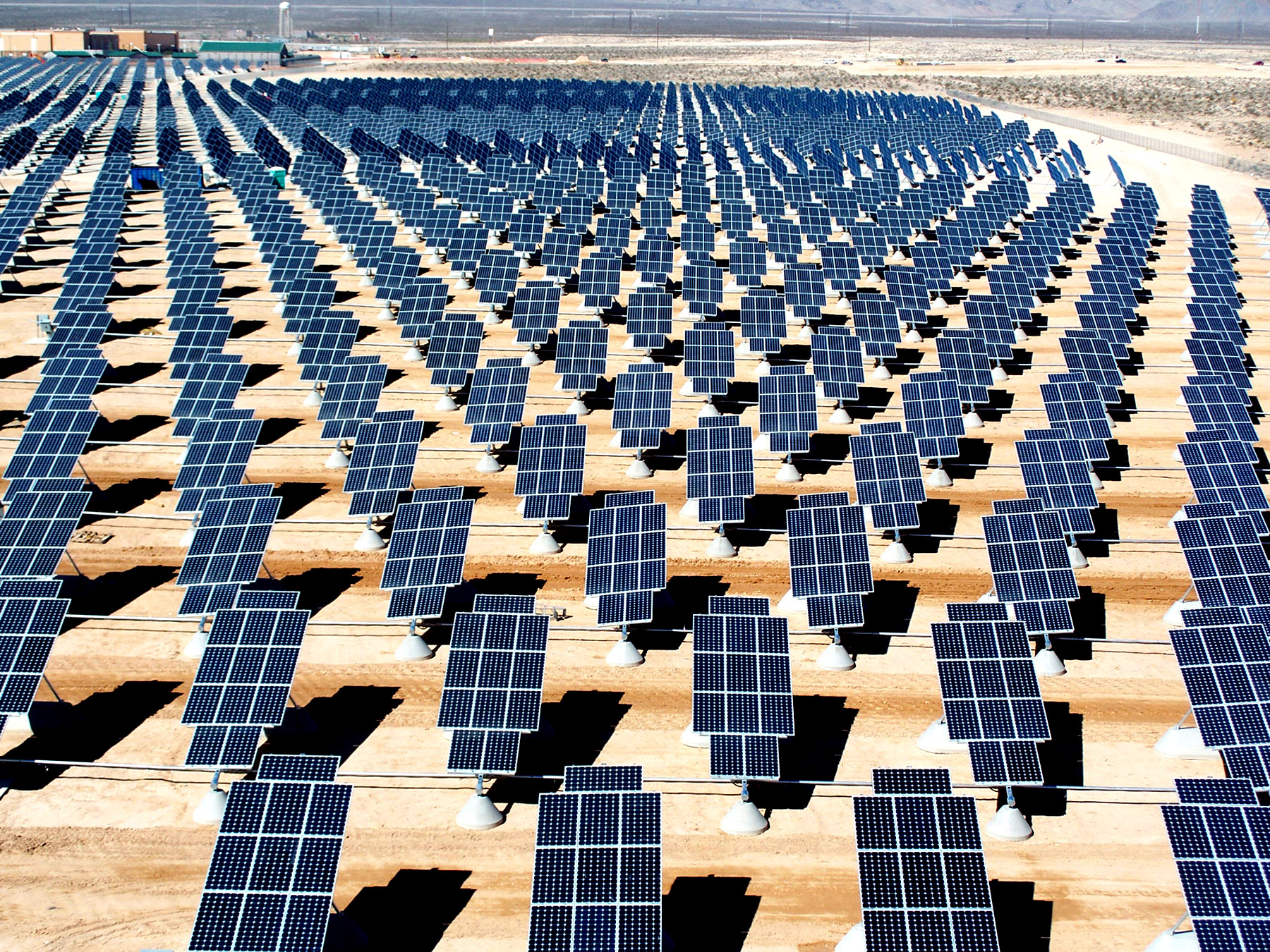
Nellis Solar Power Plant in Nevada, United States

Solar energy can be transformed into electricity either directly in solar cells, or in a concentrating solar power plant by focusing the light to run a heat engine.

A solar photovoltaic power plant converts sunlight into direct current electricity using the photoelectric effect. Inverters change the direct current into alternating current for connection to the electrical grid. This type of plant does not use rotating machines for energy conversion.

Solar thermal power plants use either parabolic troughs or heliostats to direct sunlight onto a pipe containing a heat transfer fluid, such as oil. The heated oil is then used to boil water into steam, which turns a turbine that drives an electrical generator. The central tower type of solar thermal power plant uses hundreds or thousands of mirrors, depending on size, to direct sunlight onto a receiver on top of a tower. The heat is used to produce steam to turn turbines that drive electrical generators.

=== Wind ===
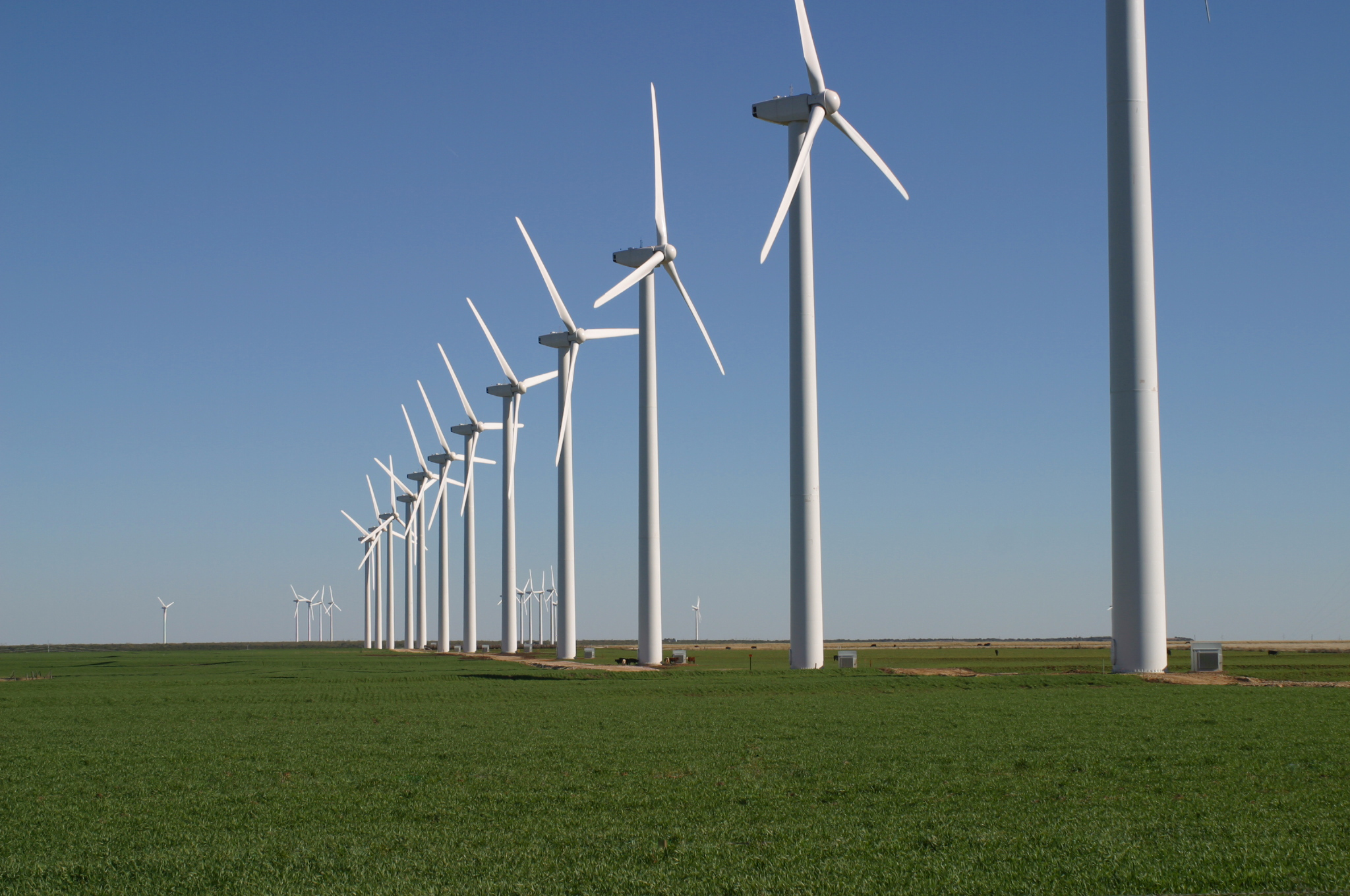
Wind turbines in Texas, United States

Wind turbines can be used to generate electricity in areas with strong, steady winds, sometimes offshore. Many different designs have been used in the past, but almost all modern turbines use a three-bladed, upwind design. Grid-connected wind turbines now being built are much larger than the units installed during the 1970s. They thus produce power more cheaply and reliably than earlier models. With larger turbines (on the order of one megawatt), the blades move more slowly than older, smaller, units, which makes them less visually distracting and safer for birds.

=== Marine ===
Marine energy or marine power (also sometimes referred to as ocean energy or ocean power) refers to the energy carried by ocean waves, tides, salinity, and ocean temperature differences. The movement of water in the world's oceans creates a vast store of kinetic energy, or energy in motion. This energy can be harnessed to generate electricity to power homes, transport and industries.

The term marine energy encompasses both wave power—power from surface waves, and tidal power—obtained from the kinetic energy of large bodies of moving water. Offshore wind power is not a form of marine energy, as wind power is derived from the wind, even if the wind turbines are placed over water.

The Oceans have a large amount of energy and are close to many if not most concentrated populations. Ocean energy has the potential to provide more renewable energy worldwide.

=== Osmosis ===
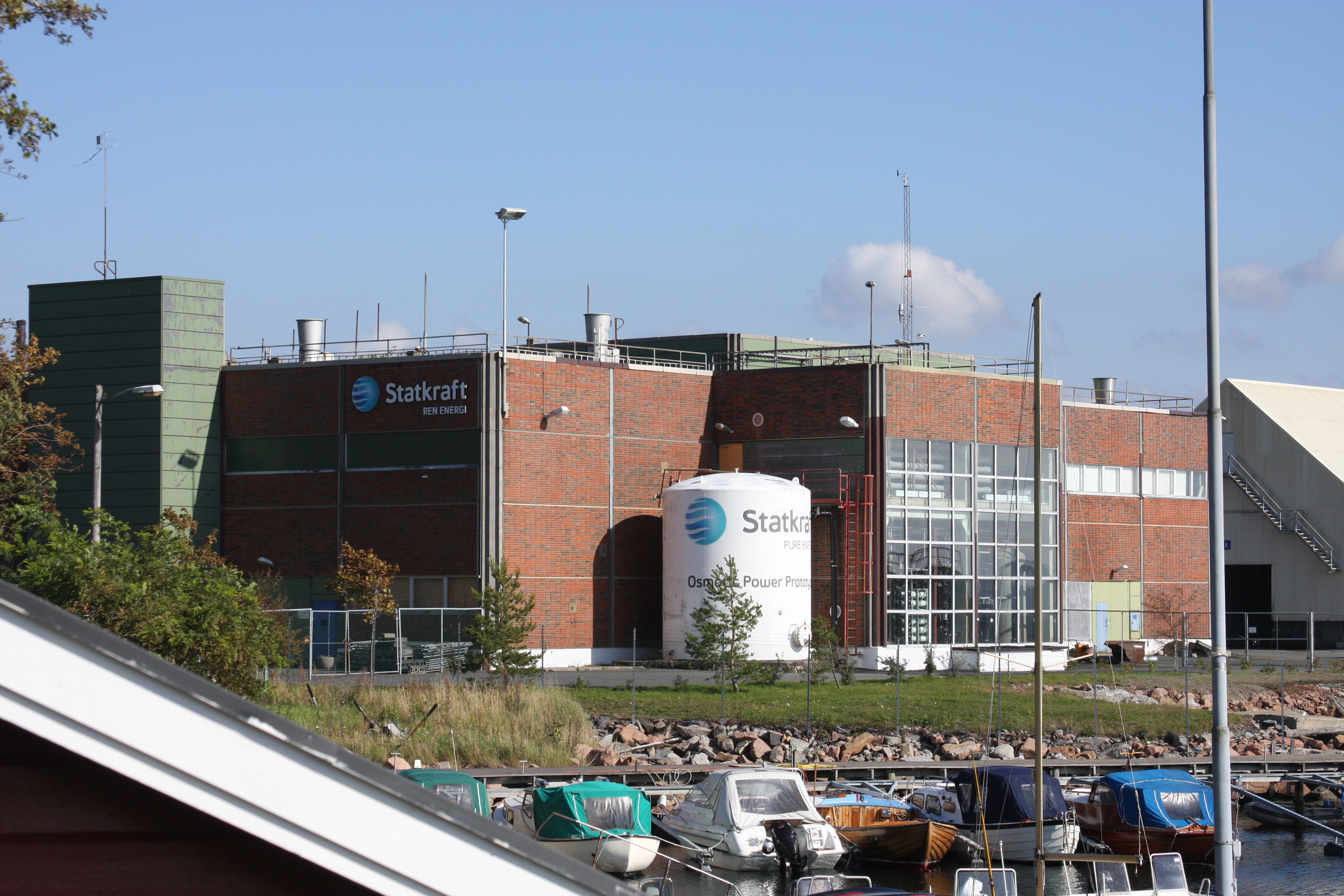
Osmotic Power Prototype at Tofte (Hurum), Norway

Salinity gradient energy is called pressure-retarded osmosis. In this method, seawater is pumped into a pressure chamber at a pressure lower than the difference between the pressures of saline water and fresh water. Freshwater is also pumped into the pressure chamber through a membrane, which increases both the volume and pressure of the chamber. As the pressure differences are compensated, a turbine is spun creating energy. This method is being specifically studied by the Norwegian utility Statkraft, which has calculated that up to 25 TWh/yr would be available from this process in Norway. Statkraft has built the world's first prototype osmotic power plant on the Oslo fjord which was opened on 24 November 2009. In January 2014, however, Statkraft announced not continue this pilot.

=== Biomass ===
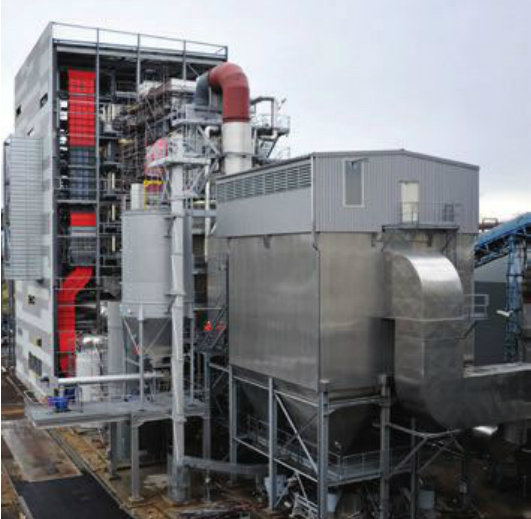
Metz biomass power station

Biomass energy can be produced from the combustion of waste green material to heat water into steam and drive a steam turbine. Bioenergy can also be processed through a range of temperatures and pressures in gasification, pyrolysis or torrefaction reactions. Depending on the desired end product, these reactions create more energy-dense products (syngas, wood pellets, biocoal) that can then be fed into an accompanying engine to produce electricity at a much lower emission rate when compared with open burning.

== Storage power stations ==
It is possible to store energy and produce electrical power at a later time as in pumped-storage hydroelectricity, thermal energy storage, flywheel energy storage, battery storage power station and so on.

=== Pumped storage ===
The world's largest form of storage for excess electricity, pumped-storage is a reversible hydroelectric plant. They are a net consumer of energy but provide storage for any source of electricity, effectively smoothing peaks and troughs in electricity supply and demand. Pumped storage plants typically use "spare" electricity during off-peak periods to pump water from a lower reservoir to an upper reservoir. Because the pumping takes place "off peak", electricity is less valuable than at peak times. This less valuable "spare" electricity comes from uncontrolled wind power and base load power plants such as coal, nuclear and geothermal, which still produce power at night even though demand is very low. During daytime peak demand, when electricity prices are high, the storage is used for peaking power, where water in the upper reservoir is allowed to flow back to a lower reservoir through a turbine and generator. Unlike coal power stations, which can take more than 12 hours to start up from cold, a hydroelectric generator can be brought into service in a few minutes, ideal to meet a peak load demand. Two substantial pumped storage schemes are in South Africa, Palmiet Pumped Storage Scheme and another in the Drakensberg, Ingula Pumped Storage Scheme.

== Typical power output ==
The power generated by a power station is measured in multiples of the watt, typically megawatts (10^{6} watts) or gigawatts (10^{9} watts). Power stations vary greatly in capacity depending on the type of power plant and on historical, geographical and economic factors.

Many of the largest operational onshore wind farms are located in China. As of 2022, the Gansu Wind Farm is the largest onshore wind farm in the world, producing 10.45 GW of power, followed by Zhang Jiakou (3000 MW). As of January 2022, the Hornsea Wind Farm in United Kingdom is the largest offshore wind farm in the world at 1218 MW, followed by Walney Wind Farm in United Kingdom at 1026 MW.

In 2021, the worldwide installed capacity of power plants increased by 347 GW. Solar and wind power plant capacities rose by 80% in one year. As of 2022, the largest photovoltaic (PV) power plants in the world are led by Bhadla Solar Park in India, rated at 2245 MW.

The largest solar thermal power station in the U.S. (Ivanpah Solar Power Facility) has an output of 392 MW.

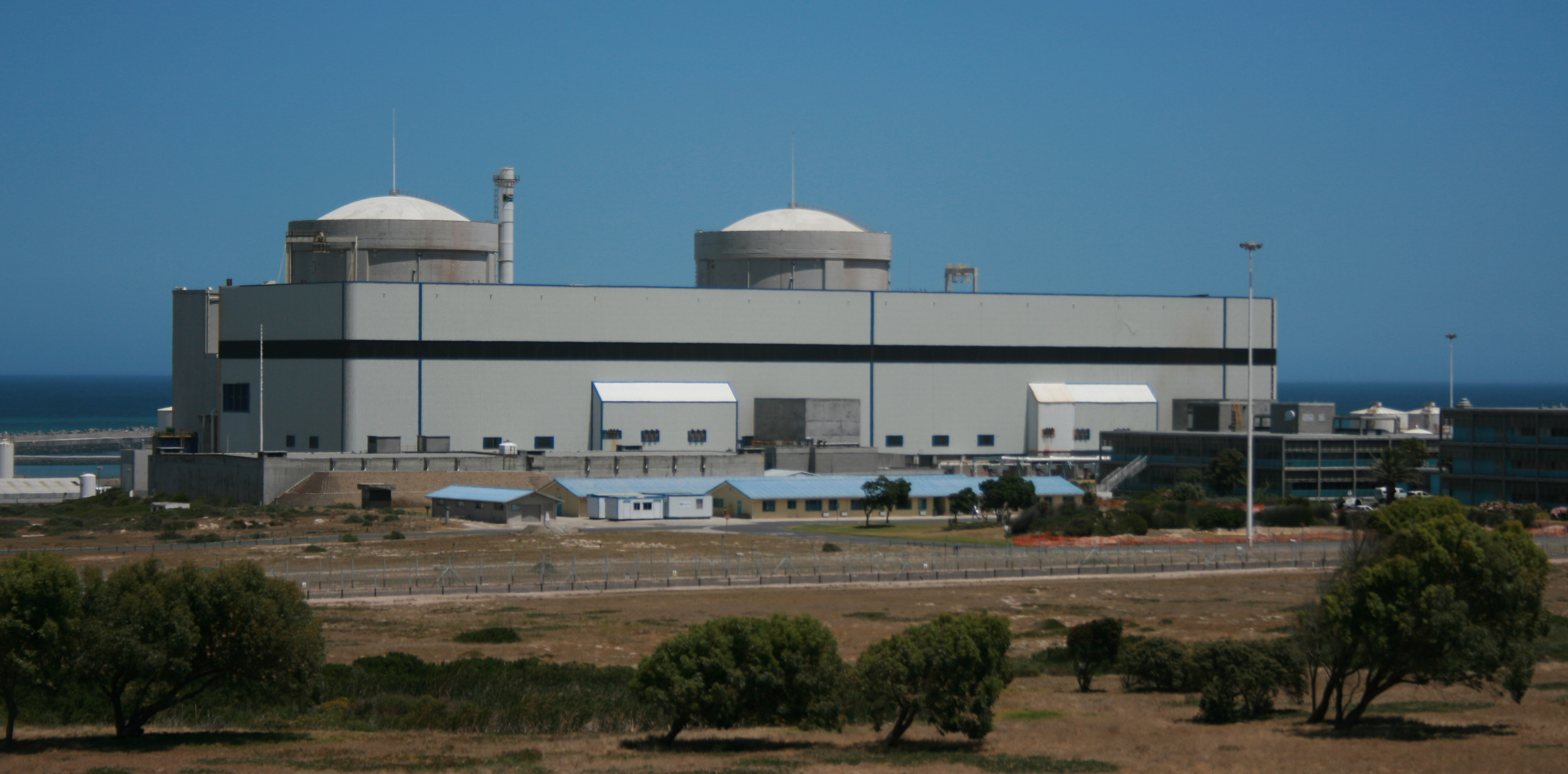
The Koeberg Nuclear Power Station, South Africa

Large coal-fired, nuclear, and hydroelectric power stations can generate hundreds of megawatts to multiple gigawatts. Some examples:

The Koeberg Nuclear Power Station in South Africa has a rated capacity of 1860 megawatts.
The coal-fired Ratcliffe-on-Soar Power Station in the UK had a rated capacity of 2 gigawatts.
The Aswan Dam hydro-electric plant in Egypt has a capacity of 2.1 gigawatts.
The Three Gorges Dam hydro-electric plant in China has a capacity of 22.5 gigawatts.

Gas turbine power plants can generate tens to hundreds of megawatts. Some examples:

The Indian Queens simple-cycle, or open-cycle gas turbine (OCGT), peaking power station in Cornwall UK, with a single gas turbine is rated 140 megawatts.
The Medway Power Station, a combined-cycle gas turbine (CCGT) power station in Kent, UK, with two gas turbines and one steam turbine, is rated 700 megawatts.

The rated capacity of a power station is nearly the maximum electrical power it can produce. Some power plants are run at almost exactly their rated capacity all the time, as a non-load-following base load power plant, except during scheduled or unscheduled maintenance.

However, many power plants usually produce much less power than their rated capacity.

In some cases a power plant produces much less power than its rated capacity because it uses an intermittent energy source. Operators try to pull maximum available power from such power plants, because their marginal cost is practically zero, but the available power varies widely—in particular, it may be zero during heavy storms at night.

In some cases operators deliberately produce less power for economic reasons. The cost of fuel to run a load following power plant may be relatively high, and the cost of fuel to run a peaking power plant is even higher—they have relatively high marginal costs. Operators keep power plants turned off ("operational reserve") or running at minimum fuel consumption ("spinning reserve") most of the time. Operators feed more fuel into load-following power plants only when the demand rises above what lower-cost plants (i.e., intermittent and base load plants) can produce, and then feed more fuel into peaking power plants only when the demand rises faster than the load-following power plants can follow.

=== Output metering ===
Not all of the generated power of a plant is necessarily delivered into a distribution system. Power plants typically also use some of the power themselves, in which case the generation output is classified into gross generation and net generation.

Gross generation or gross electric output is the total amount of electricity generated by a power plant over a specific period. It is measured at the generating terminal and is measured in kilowatt-hours (kW·h), megawatt-hours (MW·h), gigawatt-hours (GW·h) or for the largest power plants terawatt-hours (TW·h). It includes the electricity used in the plant auxiliaries and in the transformers.

Gross generation = net generation + usage within the plant (also known as in-house loads)

Net generation is the amount of electricity generated by a power plant that is transmitted and distributed for consumer use. Net generation is less than the total gross power generation as some power produced is consumed within the plant itself to power auxiliary equipment such as pumps, motors and pollution control devices. Thus

Net generation = gross generation − usage within the plant (a.k.a. in-house loads)

== Operations ==
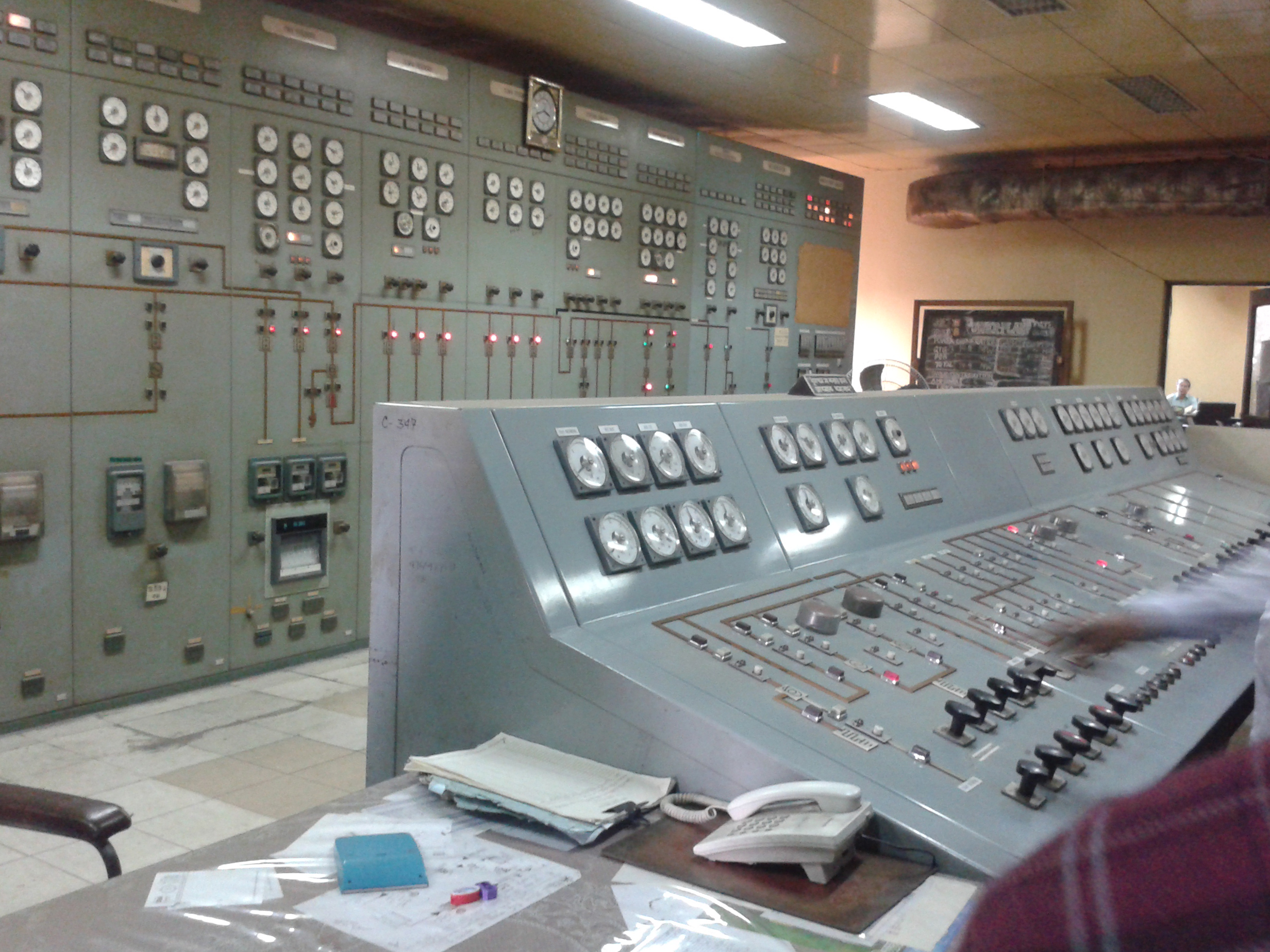
Control room of a power plant

Operating staff at a power station have several duties. Operators are responsible for the safety of the work crews that frequently do repairs on the mechanical and electrical equipment. They maintain the equipment with periodic inspections and log temperatures, pressures and other important information at regular intervals. Operators are responsible for starting and stopping the generators depending on need. They are able to synchronize and adjust the voltage output of the added generation with the running electrical system, without upsetting the system. They must know the electrical and mechanical systems to troubleshoot problems in the facility and add to the reliability of the facility. Operators must be able to respond to an emergency and know the procedures in place to deal with it.

== See also ==
- Cogeneration
- Cooling tower
- Cost of electricity by source
- District heating
- Electricity generation
- Environmental impact of electricity generation
- Flue-gas stack
- Fossil-fuel power station
- Geothermal electricity
- Gravitation water vortex power plant
- Grid-tied electrical system mini-power plants
- List of largest power stations in the world
- List of power stations
- List of thermal power station failures
- Nuclear power plant
- Plant efficiency
- Public utility building
- Unit commitment problem
- Virtual power plant
- Power station
