= Pocket Power Stations =

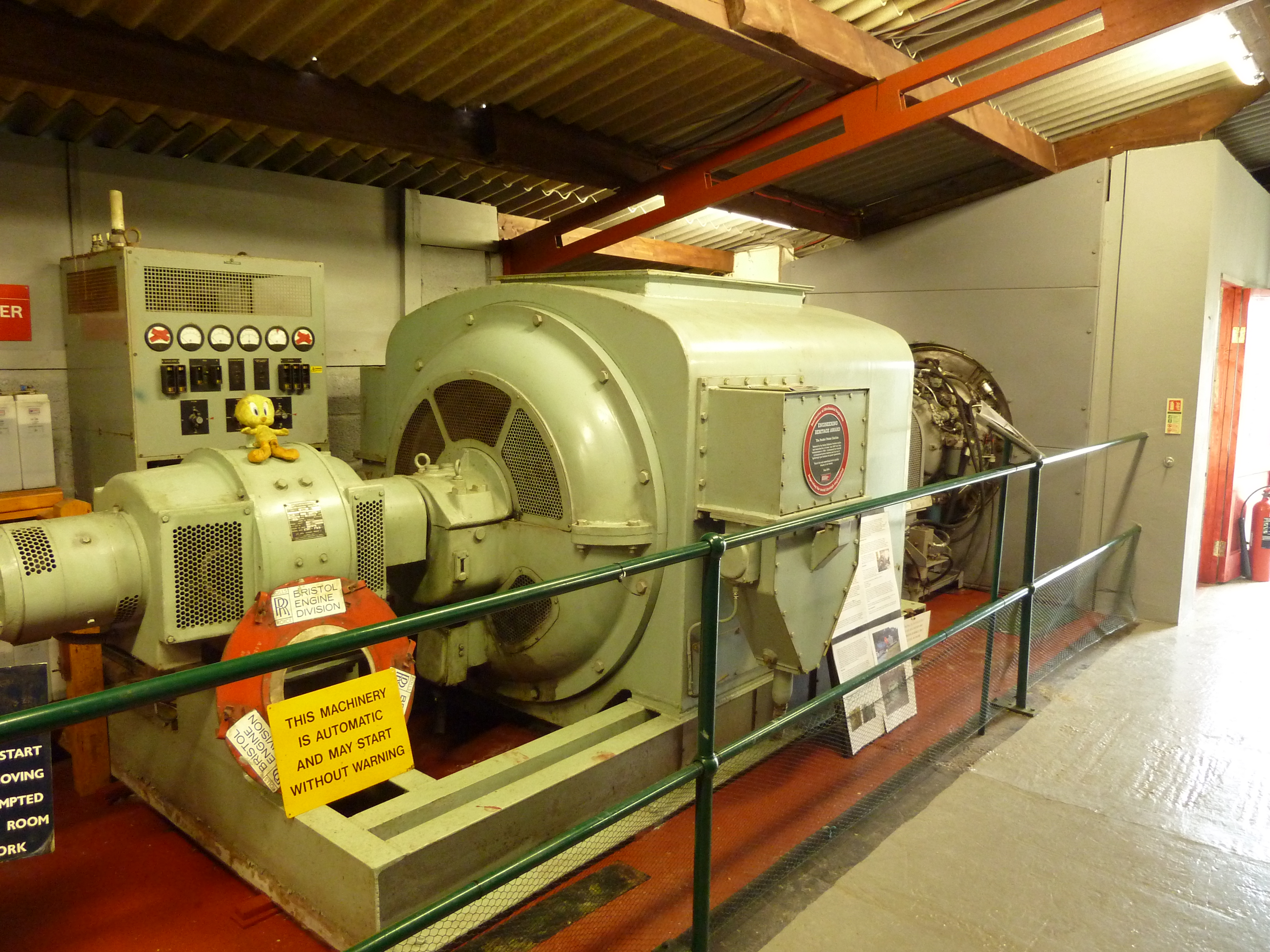
generator set as one of the "Pocket Power Stations"

Pocket Power Stations were an early commercial use of Gas Turbine engines (Bristol Proteus), by the South Western Electricity Board, to generate electricity for the grid. They were the world's first unmanned electricity generation stations.
