= Bristol Type 172 =

Proposed 1940s military aeroplane

Type 172
- Projection drawing

General information
- Type: Long-range Bomber
- National origin: United Kingdom
- Manufacturer: Bristol Aeroplane Company
- Number built: 0

The Bristol Type 172 was a proposed British long range four-engined bomber project developed by the Bristol Aeroplane Company. It is closely related to the Type 174 and Type 176 proposals.

In response to official interest in the development of increasingly capable strategic bomber in the aftermath of the Second World War, Bristol commenced work during late 1946 on its own new bomber design, which made use of relatively new aviation trends, such as turbojet propulsion and a sweptback wing. The Type 172 quickly garnered the Air Staff's interest and, on 23 July 1947, the Air Ministry issued Specification E.8/47 to Bristol. The firm began work on the comprehensive evaluation of the Type 172 aerodynamic properties and other key performance attributes.

To support the project's experimental stage, a half-scale flight-capable model, the Type 174, was devised. This was geometrically similar to the full-scale Type 172, but powered by a single Rolls-Royce Nene turbojet engine instead of four units. As the programme developed, it was recognised that the unsuitably high subsonic flow around the wing-body junction would necessitate the redesign of the wing, thus work on the Type 174 was stopped in November 1947 and a revision of the E.8/47 specification was issued on 8 June 1948, which stipulated numerous new design requirements and changes. In response, Bristol designed the Type 176.

Work on the Type 176 proceeded further than the prior efforts, reaching the mockup stage in late 1948. However, company management felt that other undertakings by the company, such as the Bristol Britannia turboprop-powered airliner, ought to be prioritised and, due to limited design resources, activity on the Type 176 was abandoned. No aircraft, full-scale or otherwise, were ever completed. Knowledge from the project was harnessed in several of the company's other proposals, including the Type 182, which was also known the Short Range Expendable Bomber.

== Design and development ==
Shortly after the end of the Second World War, the British government was highly interested in developing the capabilities of the Royal Air Force's strategic bomber fleet. This interest was present within the Air Ministry, which sought a high-speed long-range bomber powered by four turbojet engines. During October 1946, the Bristol Aeroplane Company decided to tendered its own design, designated Type 172. In terms of its basic configuration, it was a high wing monoplane furnished with a 45 degree sweepback. Bristol's submission was warmly received by the Air Staff, leading to the formulation of plans for an experimental programme to comprehensively evaluate the design's stability, control, and manoeuvrability. On 23 July 1947, the Air Ministry issued Specification E.8/47 ("Prototype Flying Models to Operational Requirement 250") to Bristol.

Amongst other aspects, this programme called for the construction of a half-scale flying model, which was designated Type 174. Geometrically similar to the Type 172, the Type 174 was to be powered by a single Rolls-Royce Nene turbojet engine and capable of seating a single pilot within its pressurised cockpit. The engine was installed in a central position, air was fed to it through bifurcated inlets which, along with the profiling of the tail pipes, intentionally reproduced the anticipated external air flow of the full-scale aircraft. Additionally, provisions were made in the design for the incorporation of boundary layer control via suction; this was to be tested during the later portion of the flight test programme. The Type 174 was intended to achieve the same speed and altitude as had been projected for the Type 172, amongst other performance requirements.

Aerodynamic investigation determined that the design's original shape would not work, specifically due to the high subsonic flow around the wing-body junction was unsuitable, thus the leading edge of the wing would need to be swept. Accordingly, during November 1947, work on the Type 174 was stopped and the E.8/47 specification was revised. The updated specification, formally issued on 8 June 1948, called for a smaller 3/10th scale monoplane that would be powered by the newer Rolls-Royce Avon engine instead; other changes included the use of a swept shoulder-mounted wing, a swept but otherwise conventional tail unit, a single air intake in the nose, and the use of tandem landing gear.

In response to the changing requirements of the Air Ministry, Bristol had already begun to produce their latest design revision, designated Type 176, as early as February 1948. According to the aviation historian C.H. Barnes, progress on the Type 176 proceeded further it had with either the Type 172 or Type 174; however, by the time the mock-up conference was held in October 1948, the company's management was increasingly aware that its design resources had been spread relatively thin across multiple undertakings. At that time, projects such as the Bristol Britannia, an airliner incorporating ground-breaking turboprop propulsion and capable of the then-uncommon feat of regular transatlantic flights, was judged to take precedence.

Accordingly, work on the lower priority Type 176 was shelved in favour of Bristol's other endeavours. Despite this decision, Bristol retained a handful of personnel working in this area, who continued to generate design brochures and tenders to various specifications. Their continued efforts in this area led to the Type 182, also referred to as the Short Range Expendable Bomber, which was intended to be operationally alike to the V-1 flying bomb deployed by Nazi Germany during the Second World War.

== Variants ==
Bristol Type 172
Proposal for a four-engined long-range bomber, not built.
Bristol Type 174
Half-scale variant of the Type 172 for design evaluation powered by a Nene engine, not built.
Bristol Type 176
Revised 3/10th Scale development aircraft for the Type 172 powered by a Avon engine, mock-up only, not built.

== Specification (Type 172 as proposed) ==
Data from Bristol Aircraft since 1919

General characteristics

- Crew: 4
- Length: 100 ft (30 m)
- Wingspan: 110 ft (34 m)
- Height: 28 ft (8.5 m)
- Wing area: 2,250 sq ft (209 m^{2})
- Empty weight: 80,000 lb (36,287 kg)
- Max takeoff weight: 165,000 lb (74,843 kg)
- Powerplant: 4 × Bristol turbojets , 9,000 lbf (40 kN) thrust each

Performance

- Maximum speed: 600 mph (970 km/h, 520 kn)
- Range: 5,400 mi (8,700 km, 4,700 nmi)
- Service ceiling: 50,000 ft (15,000 m)
