= Solar generator =

Electricity generation system

A solar generator is a portable unit that contains a battery pack, a means of connecting charging power source and an inverter to provide AC power from battery.

== Overview ==
Solar generators typically consist of four primary components:

- Solar panels – to capture sunlight and convert it into electricity.
- Charge controller – to regulate the voltage and current coming from the panels.
- Battery – usually lithium-ion or lithium iron phosphate (LiFePO4), to store the generated energy.
- Inverter – to convert the stored direct current (DC) into alternating current (AC) for powering standard appliances.

The term "solar generator" is often used in consumer markets to describe these self-contained systems, as they intend to compete with and/or replace traditional generators that require fuel. Though technically they are portable photovoltaic power systems with energy storage.

Solar generators are used in a wide variety of contexts, including:

- Residential backup power – during grid outages.
- Recreational use – camping, RVing, and tailgating.
- Remote locations – powering devices in areas without grid access.

=== Power station ===
Solar generators without the ability to generate electricity via solar, are referred to as (portable) power stations (PPS). They typically have significantly higher input, output and storage capacity compared to power banks. They are charged by power brick, cigarette socket and/or car fast charger (hardwired to alternator).

=== Plug-and-play solar ===
Also known as balcony solar, are solar generators and/or portable power stations that backfeed into a regular household wall outlet. Charged via solar panels and/or grid power (when the price is low). They are illegal in many countries and areas as backfeeding requires council approval, fixed (permanent) connection to the grid, metering, centralised control and/or installation by licensed electrician.

== History ==
The origin of solar-powered generators dates back to the broader development of solar photovoltaic technology (also known as PV system). Solar-powered generators began to develop as solar panel technology improved. The space industry first used solar power because it needed light and reliable energy for satellites, which later helped bring solar technology down to Earth for everyday use.

The first practical silicon solar cell was developed in 1954 by Bell Labs, marking the beginning of modern solar power applications. It achieved an efficiency of about 6 percent and laid the groundwork for modern photovoltaic systems. However, it was not until the late 20th and early 21st centuries that compact solar generators became commercially viable due to advancements in battery storage and solar panel efficiency.

The concept of storing solar energy for off-grid use gained traction in the 1970s during the global energy crisis, which spurred interest in alternative energy technologies. Early adopters included the military and scientific communities, particularly for powering remote monitoring equipment and field operations.

Although basic solar power kits were available in the 1980s and 1990s, the emergence of integrated, consumer-grade solar generator systems began in the early 2000s. These systems were designed to provide portable power for applications such as camping, recreational vehicles (RVs), and residential backup during grid outages. Market demand for off-grid and emergency power solutions contributed to the gradual growth of this segment.
