= Spica (disambiguation) =

Spica is the brightest star in the constellation Virgo.

Spica may refer to:

== Music ==
- Spica (band), a South Korean girl group
- "Spica/Hanabi/Moon", a 2003 maxi single by Lia
- "Spica" (Maaya Sakamoto song), 2006
- "Spica", a composition for trumpet and piano by Hale A. VanderCook

== Medicine ==
- Spica cast, a type of orthopedic cast
- Spica splint, a type of orthopedic splint

== Naval vessels ==
- USS Spica (AK-16), a Sirius-class cargo ship of World War II
- USNS Spica (T-AFS-9), a Sirius-class combat stores ship of the United States Navy
- HSwMS Spica, several ships of the Swedish Navy
- German trawler V 804 Spica, a World War II patrol boat
- Spica-class torpedo boat (Italy), a class of Italian torpedo boats during World War II
  - Spica, lead ship of the class, sold to Sweden in 1940 and renamed HSwMS Romulus (27)
- Spica-class torpedo boat (Sweden)

== Technology ==
- Samsung i5700, a smartphone also known as the Samsung Spica
- SPICA (spacecraft), a proposed infrared space telescope by JAXA

== Fictional characters ==
- Spica, in the manga The Mythical Detective Loki Ragnarok
- Angela Spica, the second Engineer (comics)

== Other uses ==
- Spica (moth), a genus of moths belonging to the subfamily Thyatirinae
- SPICA (Società Pompe Iniezione Cassani & Affini), an Italian manufacturer of fuel injection systems
