= Spica-class torpedo boat =

Spica-class torpedo boat may refer to:

- Spica-class torpedo boat (Italy)
- Spica-class torpedo boat (Sweden)

== See also ==
- Spica (disambiguation)
