= HSwMS Spica =

Several ships of the Swedish Navy have been named HSwMS Spica, named after the Spica star:

- HSwMS Spica (1908) was a 1.-class torpedo boat launched in 1908 and decommissioned in 1947
- HSwMS Spica (T121) was a Spica-class torpedo boat launched in 1966 and decommissioned in 1989
