= HSwMS Spica (T121) =

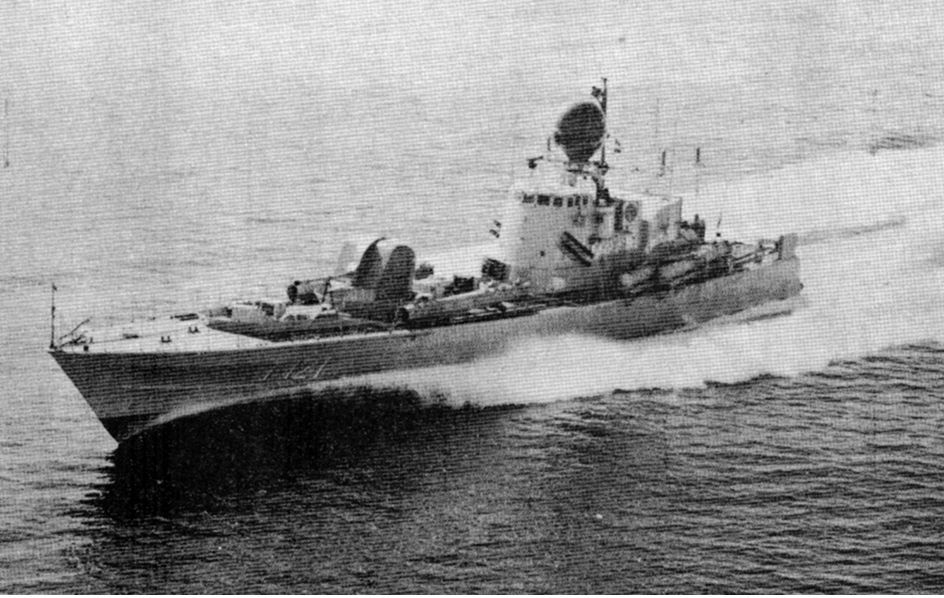
- HSwMS Spica at sea.

History

Sweden
- Name: HSwMS Spica
- Namesake: Spica
- Builder: Götaverken AB
- Launched: 24 June 1966
- Decommissioned: 1989
- Identification: T121
- Status: Museum ship since 1989

General characteristics
- Class & type: Spica-class fast attack craft (FAC)
- Displacement: 210 tons
- Length: 42.5 m (139 ft)
- Beam: 7.1 m (23 ft)
- Draught: 2.6 m (8 ft 6 in)
- Propulsion: Three Bristol Proteus 4,250 HP gas-turbines driving 3 hydraulically controllable pitch screws
- Speed: 40 knots+
- Complement: 30
- Armament: 1× Bofors 57 mm gun, 6× 533 mm (21.0 in) wire-guided torpedoes, 2× 7.62×51mm NATO machine guns, Flare and chaff rockets, naval mines and/or depth charges

HSwMS Spica (T121) is a former Swedish Navy Spica-class, torpedo-armed, fast attack craft (FAC), now a museum ship at the Vasa Museum in Stockholm, Sweden.

== Construction and career ==
The vessel was one of three constructed in the 1960s by Götaverken AB on Hisingen, the other two being HSwMS Sirius (T122) and HSwMS Capella (T123). Three similar vessels were built by Karlskronavarvet.

The vessel was taken out of service in 1989 and made into a museum ship in her former home port of Karlskrona until 2002. It was subsequently moved to the Vasa Museum. It is a listed historic ship of Sweden.

== Gallery ==
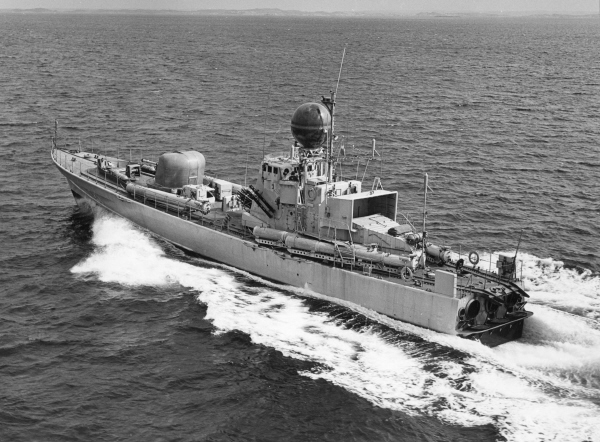
HSwMS Spica at sea in 1966.

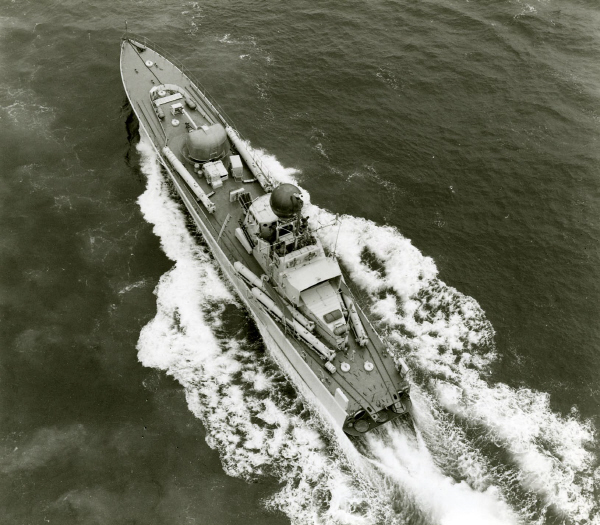
HSwMS Spica at sea in 1966.

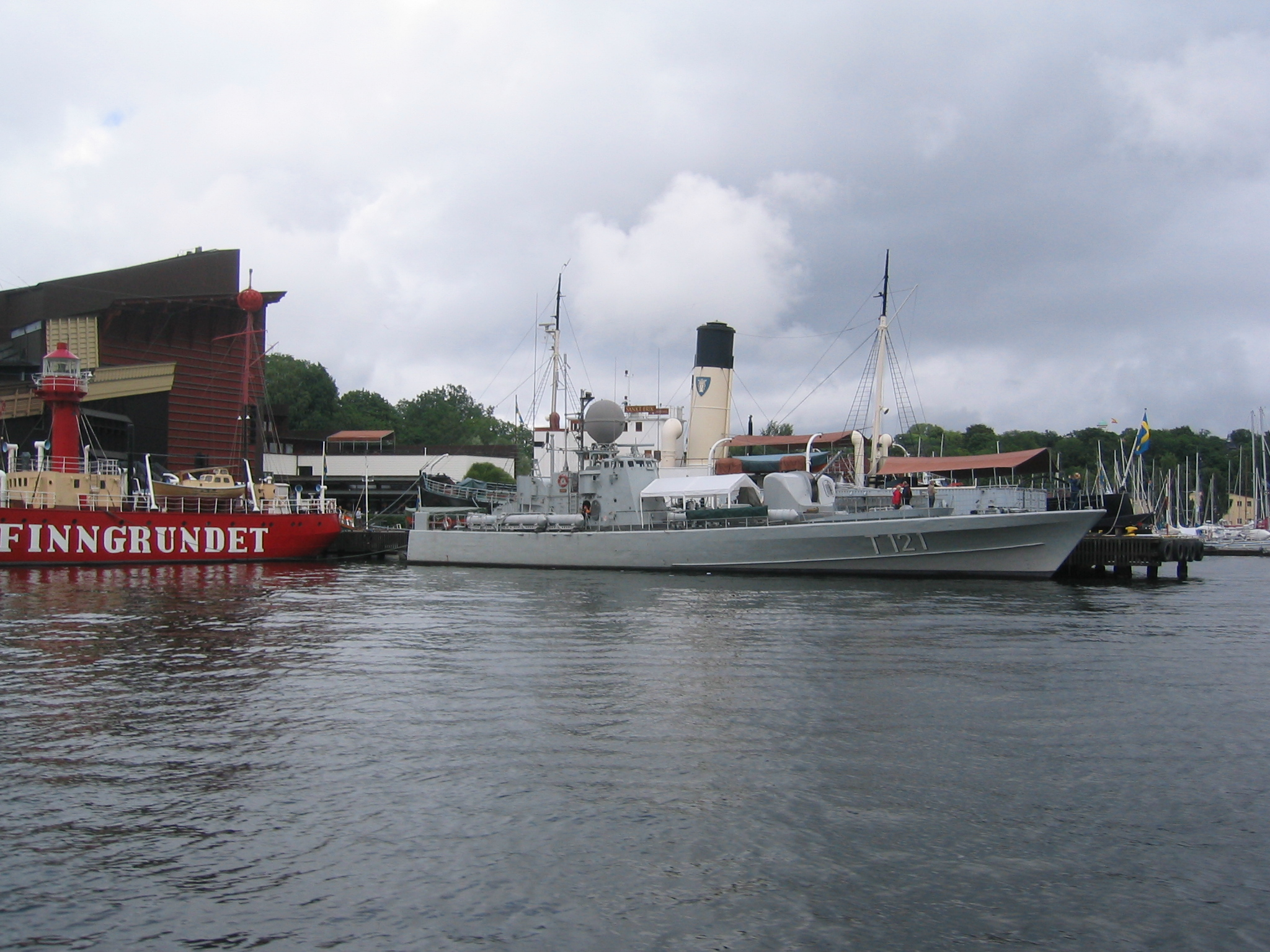
HSwMS Spica moored outside of the Vasa Museum in July 2005. The tall funnel belongs to SS Sankt Erik, moored on the other side of the jetty.

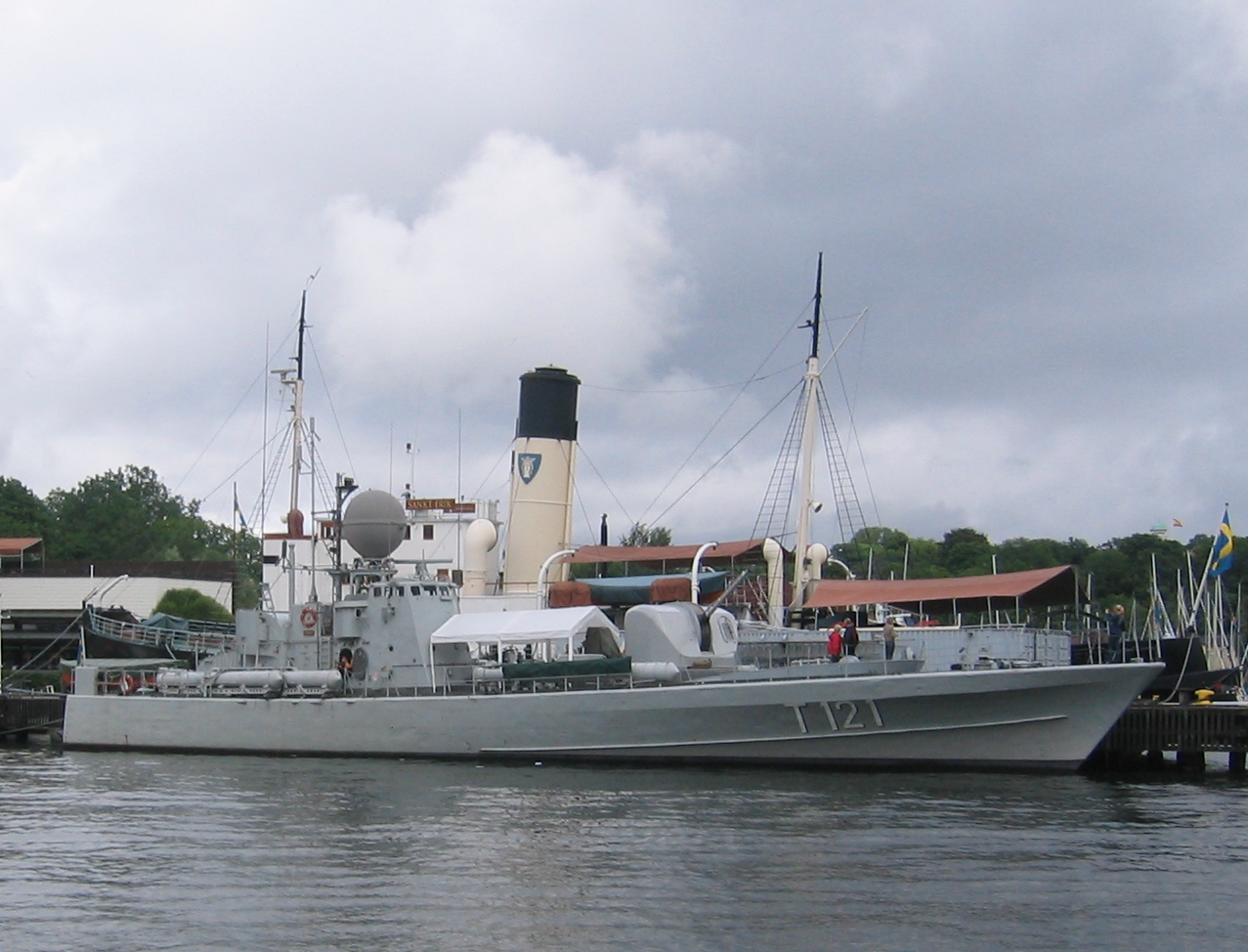
HSwMS Spica moored outside of the Vasa Museum in July 2005. The tall funnel belongs to SS Sankt Erik, moored on the other side of the jetty.

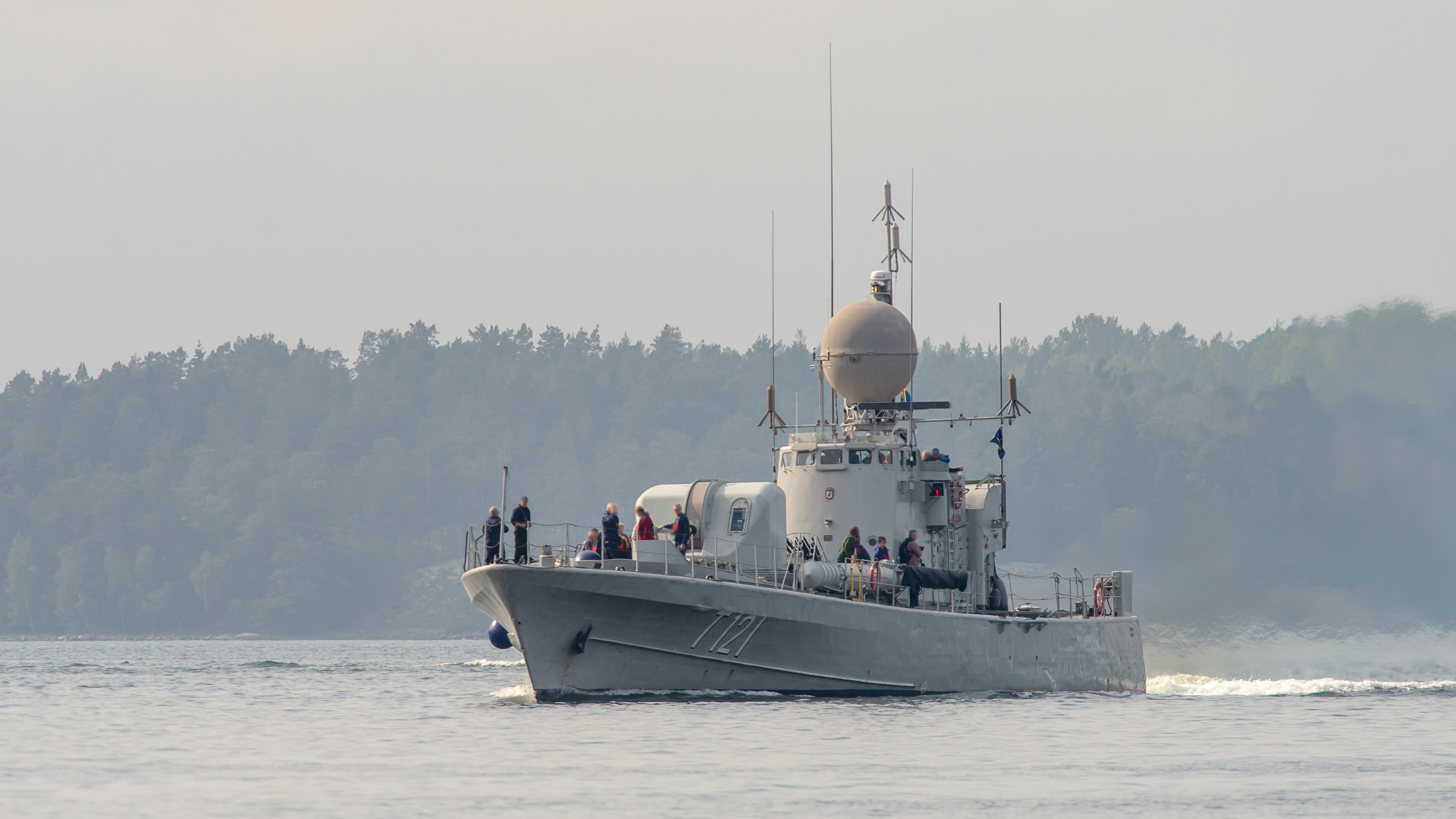
HSwMS Spica underway on 8 September 2018.
