= HSwMS Capella =

Swedish Spica-class torpedo boat

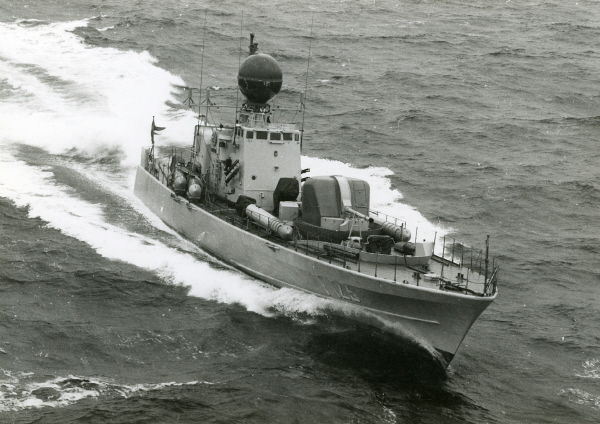
- HSwMS Capella at sea in 1968.

History

Sweden
- Name: HSwMS Capella
- Namesake: Capella
- Builder: Götaverken AB
- Launched: 26 April 1966
- Commissioned: 10 March 1967
- Decommissioned: 1 November 1989
- Identification: T123
- Status: Decommissioned

General characteristics
- Class & type: Spica-class fast attack craft (FAC)
- Displacement: 210 tons
- Length: 42.5 m (139 ft)
- Beam: 7.1 m (23 ft)
- Draught: 2.6 m (8 ft 6 in)
- Propulsion: Three Bristol Proteus 4,250 HP gas-turbines driving 3 hydraulically controllable pitch screws
- Speed: 40 knots+
- Complement: 30
- Armament: 1× Bofors 57 mm gun, 6× 533 mm (21.0 in) wire-guided torpedoes, 2× 7.62×51mm NATO machine guns, Flare and chaff rockets, naval mines and/or depth charges

HSwMS Capella (T123) was a Swedish Navy Spica-class, torpedo-armed, fast attack craft (FAC).

== Design ==
The hull was made of steel, unlike some other contemporary designs which used plywood. Although the boat had a relatively small hull and displacement, this provided a stable platform. The Bridge and Operations Room were located at the rolling and stamping centre of the ship which further improved stability for the crew especially in high seas. The boats were fitted with an NBC support system where the hull could be closed down in the event of having to operate in a nuclear fall-out area.

== Construction and career ==
The vessel was one of three constructed in the 1960s by Götaverken AB on Hisingen, the other two being HSwMS Spica (T121) and HSwMS Sirius (T122). Three similar vessels were built by Karlskronavarvet. She was launched on 26 April 1966.

The vessel was taken out of service on 1 November 1989.
