= SS Sankt Erik =

1915 Swedish icebreaker

Coordinates: 59°19′37″N 18°5′27″E

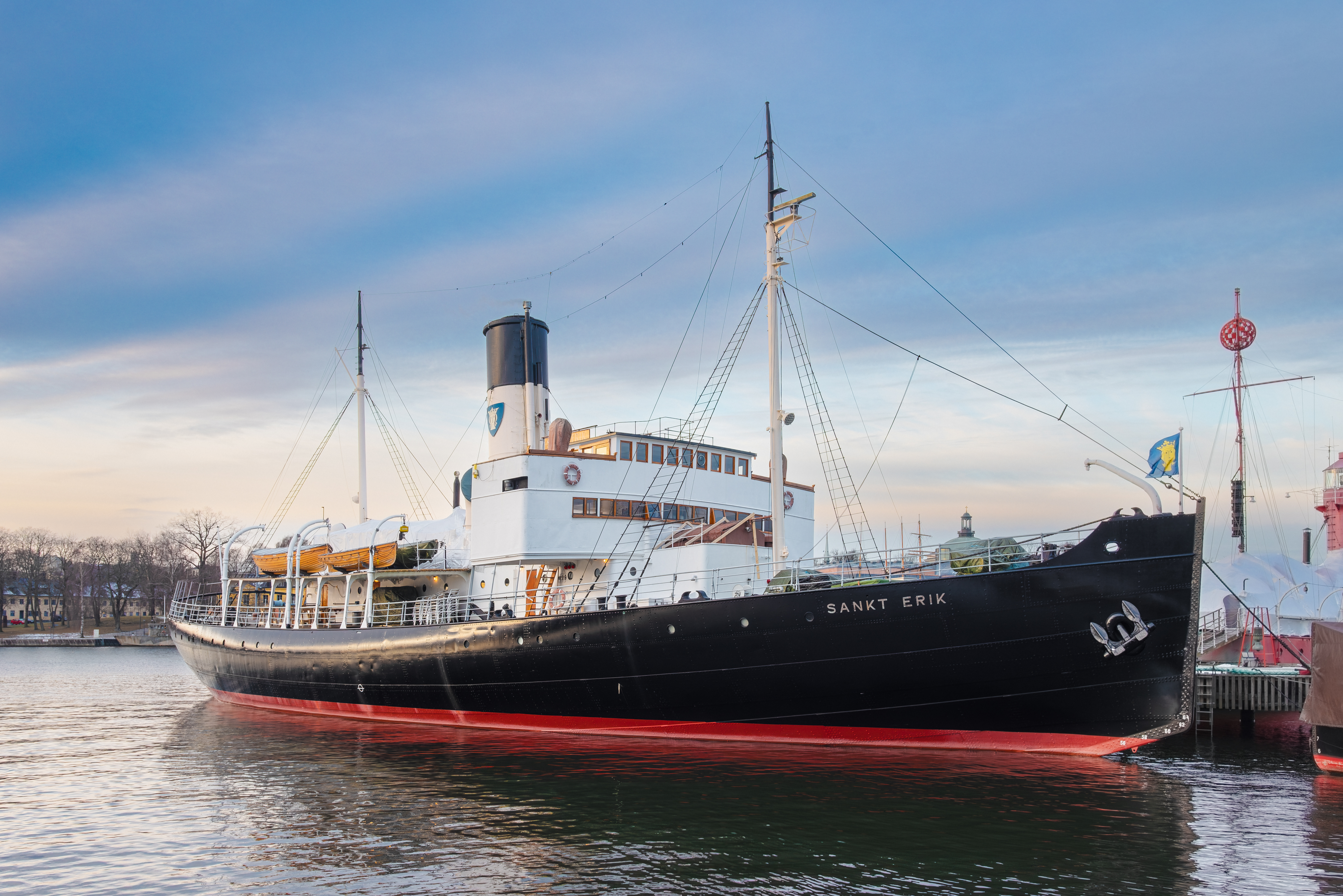
- SS Sankt Erik moored outside of the Vasa Museum in 2016. Note the shape of the bow which is designed to ride up over the ice.

History

Sweden
- Name: Isbrytaren II (1915–1959); Sankt Erik (1959–present)
- Owner: Stockholms Hamnstyrelse
- Port of registry: Sweden
- Builder: Finnboda Shipyard, Stockholm, Sweden
- Yard number: 361
- Completed: March 1915
- Out of service: 1977
- Refit: 1958
- Identification: IMO number: 5311442; MMSI number: 265586080; Callsign: SHRA
- Status: Museum ship in Stockholm since 1980

General characteristics
- Type: Icebreaker
- Tonnage: 432 NRT; 1,441 GRT
- Length: 61 m (200 ft)
- Beam: 17 m (56 ft)
- Draft: 6.5 m (21 ft)
- Boilers: Four boilers; initially coal-fired, later converted to oil
- Engines: Two triple-expansion steam engines; 1,200 ihp (bow) and 2,800 ihp (stern)
- Propulsion: Bow and stern propellers
- Speed: 11 knots (20 km/h; 13 mph)
- Crew: 30

Visitors on deck while an Amateur Radio station is being on the air from the ship (2009).

SS Sankt Erik is an icebreaker and museum ship attached to the Vasa Museum in Stockholm, Sweden.

She was launched in 1915 as Isbrytaren II ("Ice breaker II") and was a conventionally-built Baltic icebreaker with a strengthened bow shaped to be lifted up onto the ice to crush it and a forward-facing screw to push water and crushed ice along the side of the hull. She also has heeling tanks which can be filled and emptied with seawater in turn to rock the ship to widen the channel. Her reciprocating steam engines are the most powerful functioning ones in Sweden.

She was the country's first large icebreaker, and was owned and used by the City of Stockholm to keep the channels around it clear of ice. She was also sometimes used outside the Stockholm area by the Swedish government since it had contributed towards her cost.

She was renamed in 1958 during an extensive refit, which saw her converted from coal to oil, the bridge was enclosed to protect the deck crew from the weather, and radar and radio fitted.
