= USS Spica (AK-16) =

Cargo ship of the United States Navy

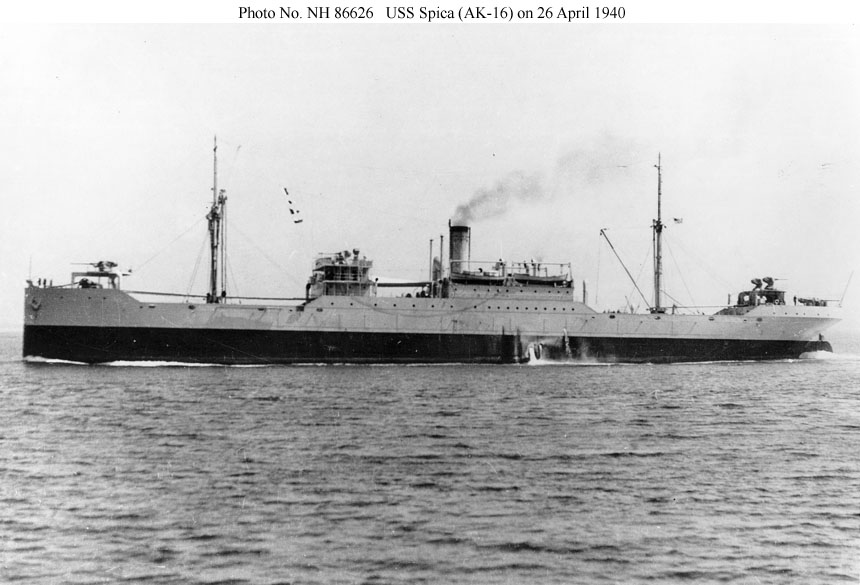
- USS Spica (AK-16) near Boston Navy Yard, 26 April 1940, soon after commissioning. It has been armed with one 5"/51 gun on a platform forward and one on the fantail, two 3"/50 guns on the bridge wings and two more on a platform on the poop. The Navy was not yet fitting splinter protection (low bulwarks) around such guns. There is no visible provision for anti-aircraft machine guns.

History

United States
- Name: Shannock; Spica
- Namesake: Spica
- Laid down: 15 June 1918, as SS Shannock
- Launched: 8 August 1919
- Acquired: 16 November 1921, renamed Spica (AK-16)
- Commissioned: 1 March 1940
- Decommissioned: 18 January 1946
- Stricken: 7 February 1946
- Identification: Hull symbol: AK-16
- Fate: Sold for operation, 2 April 1947, to J. T. Robinson Ltd. of Vancouver, B. C. Canada, removed, 13 June 1947, renamed SS Pleamar

General characteristics
- Class & type: Sirius-class cargo ship
- Type: Design 1022 ship
- Displacement: 5,800 long tons (5,900 t) (standard); 11,360 long tons (11,540 t) (full load)
- Length: 401 ft (122 m)
- Beam: 54 ft 2 in (16.51 m)
- Draft: 24 ft 5 in (7.44 m)
- Installed power: 2,500 shp (1,900 kW)
- Propulsion: 1 × General Electric-Curtis steam turbines; 2 × Babcock & Wilcox boilers header-type boilers, 215psi Sat; 1 × shaft
- Speed: 11 kn (13 mph; 20 km/h)
- Capacity: 5,475 DWT
- Complement: 8 officers 244 enlisted
- Armament: 1 × 5 in (130 mm)/38 caliber dual purpose guns; 4 × 3 in (76 mm)/50 caliber dual purpose guns; 8 × 20 mm (0.79 in) Oerlikon cannons anti-aircraft gun mounts

USS Spica (AK-16) was a Sirius-class cargo ship commissioned by the U.S. Navy for service in World War II. It was responsible for delivering necessary goods and equipment to ships and stations in the war zone.

== Construction ==
SS Shannock, a cargo ship built in 1919, by American International Shipbuilding Corp. at Hog Island, Pennsylvania, was acquired by the Navy from the United States Shipping Board on 16 November 1921, and renamed Spica (AK-16). Over the following 18 years, she remained out of commission, first at New York City, then at Charleston, South Carolina, and finally at Philadelphia, Pennsylvania, from January 1927 until 1 March 1940, when Spica was commissioned at Norfolk, Virginia.

== World War II activation and operations ==
By mid-1940, Spica was assigned to the 13th Naval District; and, until late 1943, she sailed Alaskan waters carrying supplies to American outposts on the Alaskan coast and in the Aleutian Islands. During this period, she participated in the campaign to reoccupy Attu. On 24 November 1943, she headed south to San Francisco, California, whence she departed again on 5 December.

Heading via Funafuti, she reached Kwajalein Atoll in January 1944 and returned, via Pearl Harbor, to Seattle, Washington, on 22 March. For the next six months, Spica resumed her Alaska-Aleutian circuit. On July 19 the Spica headed north with the S.S. Jonathan Harrington for Point Barrow and Cape Simpson. Together they were delivering the Seabees of Construction Battalion Detachment 1058 and 8,200 long tons of supplies and equipment needed to explore Naval Petroleum Reserve #4. In mid-September, she began a series of voyages from the U.S. West Coast to Hawaii which continued until mid-March 1945. In all, she made four round-trip voyages between Seattle and Oahu. She returned to Seattle on 17 March 1945 and, on 7 April, once again took up the northern Pacific supply runs, completing her last at Seattle on 14 September.

== Post-war decommissioning ==
In October, it was declared surplus to the needs of the Navy; and, on 18 January 1946, it decommissioned at Seattle. Its name was struck from the Navy list on 7 February 1946, and it was delivered to the Maritime Commission for lay-up pending disposal. On 13 June 1947, its hull was sold to J. T. Robinson, Ltd., a Canadian firm.

== Military awards and honors ==
Spica was awarded one battle star during World War II. Its crew members were eligible for the following medals:

- American Defense Service Medal (with Fleet clasp)
- American Campaign Medal
- Asiatic-Pacific Campaign Medal (1)
- World War II Victory Medal
