= Spica-class torpedo boat (Sweden) =

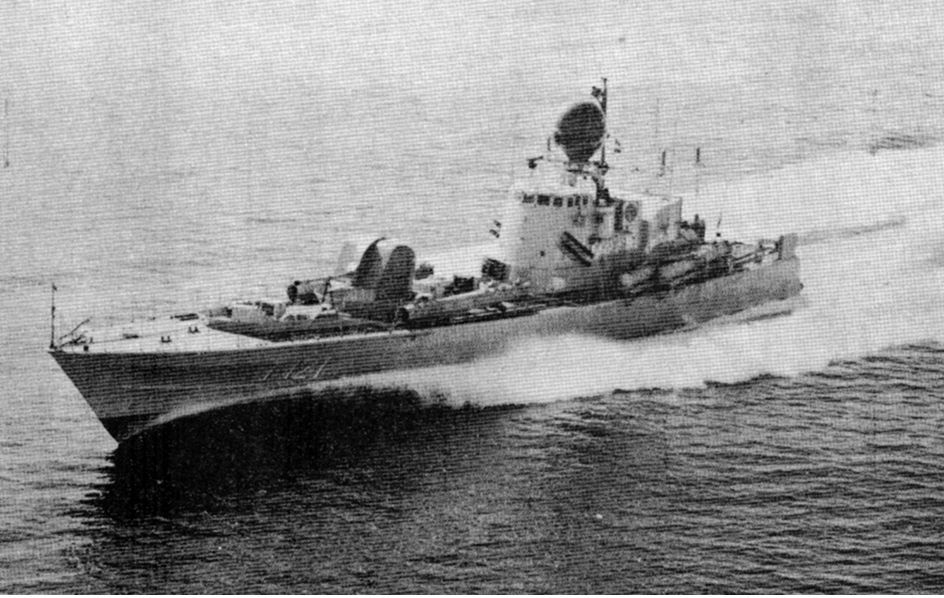
- HSwMS Spica at sea

Class overview
- Name: Spica class
- Builders: Götaverken and Karskrona Navy Yard
- Operators: Swedish Navy
- Built: 1964–1966
- In service: 1966–1989
- Completed: 6
- Retired: 6
- Preserved: HSwMS Spica

General characteristics
- Type: Torpedo boat
- Displacement: 220 tons standard, 235 tons full load
- Length: 42.5 m (139 ft)
- Beam: 7.1 m (23 ft)
- Draught: 1.6 m (5 ft 3 in)
- Propulsion: 3 shaft, Bristol Proteus gas turbines 12,750 hp (9,510 kW), 3 controllable pitch propellers
- Speed: 40 knots (74 km/h; 46 mph)
- Complement: 30
- Sensors & processing systems: Radar: Scanter 009, HSA M22
- Armament: 1 × Bofors 57 mm gun; 6 × 533 mm (21 in) wire-guided torpedoes; 2 × 7.62×51mm NATO machine guns; Flare and chaff rockets, naval mines and/or depth charges

The Spica class was a class of six fast torpedo boats built for the Swedish Navy in the 1960s and decommissioned in the late 1980s. One ship, HSwMS Spica, is preserved as a museum ship in Stockholm, Sweden.

== History ==
The ships were ordered in 1961 as part of a re-armament programme for defending Sweden's coastline. Tenders were sought from various European boat builders in the United Kingdom, Norway and Germany including Lürssen who offered the new Jaguar-class design. The Swedes ended up designing a bespoke vessel which became the template for subsequent Swedish fast attack craft.

== Design ==
The hull was made of steel, unlike some other contemporary designs which used plywood. Although the boat had a relatively small hull and displacement, this provided a stable platform. The Bridge and Operations Room were located at the rolling and stamping centre of the ship which further improved stability for the crew especially in high seas. The boats were fitted with an NBC support system where the hull could be closed down in the event of having to operate in a nuclear fall-out area.

=== Machinery ===
The machinery consisted of three shafts powered by British built, Bristol Proteus gas turbines. Three MTU gas turbines were also installed as auxiliary generators

=== Armament ===
The torpedo armament consisted of six 533 mm (21 in) torpedo tubes which were positioned at an angle. Hydrogen-peroxide propelled, wire guided torpedoes were used. The gun armament consisted of a single Bofors 57 mm gun, which was capable of firing 200 rounds per minute over an effective range of 8,500 m (27,887 ft). The gun could engage both surface and airborne targets. There were also six 57 mm (2 in) and four 103 mm (4 in) rocket launchers capable of firing chaff, infrared countermeasures and illuminating projectiles (starshell). The torpedo boats had a scanning and a fire control radar with a basic fire control computer. There were plans to replace the torpedo tubes with anti-ship missiles in the 1980s but these plans were cancelled.

== Ships ==
Number	Name	Builder	Launched	Decommissioned
T121	Spica	Götaverken	26 April 1966	1989 – preserved as a museum ship
T122	Sirius	Götaverken	26 April 1966	July 1985
T123	Capella	Götaverken	26 April 1966	1989
T124	Castor	Karlskrona Navy yard	25 October 1965	July 1985
T125	Vega	Karlskrona Navy yard	12 March 1966	1989
T126	Virgo	Karlskrona Navy Yard	10 September 1966	1989

Twelve ships of a missile boat variant were built between 1971 and 1975 as the Norrköping class (Spica II).

== Survivors ==
1 Spica-class torpedo boat is preserved as museum ship.

=== Surviving ships ===
- HSwMS Spica in Vasa Museum, Karlskrona

=== Surviving parts ===
- HSwMS Virgo in Slagsta Marina, Stockholm
