= 25 mm caliber =

Specific size of autocannon ammunition

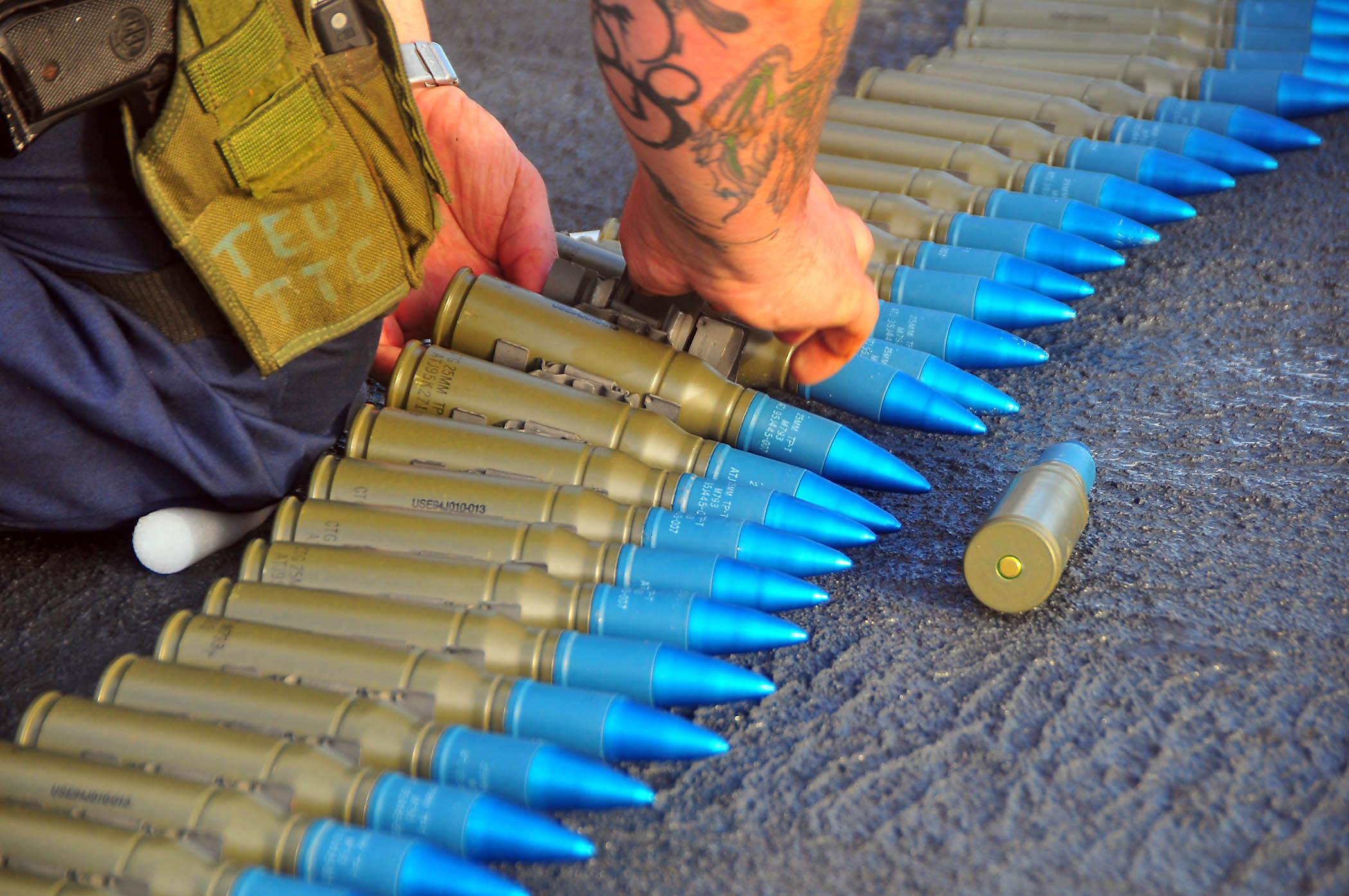
25×137mm M793 target practice with tracer (TP-T) rounds for the MK-38 being inspected

25 mm caliber is a range of autocannon ammunition. It includes the NATO standardized Swiss 25×137mm, the Swiss 25×184mm, the Soviet 25x218mmSR, and the Chinese 25×183mmB.

== Usage ==
The 25 mm round can be used for anti-materiel or anti-personnel purposes. In the anti-personnel role, a 25 mm HE round can kill large numbers of opposing troops either in the open or in light fortifications. In the anti-materiel role, a 25 mm weapon armed with armor-piercing rounds can disable many types of aircraft and ground vehicles, including some main battle tanks.

The US military uses 25 mm weapons in their AV-8B Harrier, AC-130 gunship, M2 Bradley, LAV-25, F-35 Lightning II and as a standard ship-based munition in the Mk 38 autocannon.

== Types of 25 mm ammunition ==
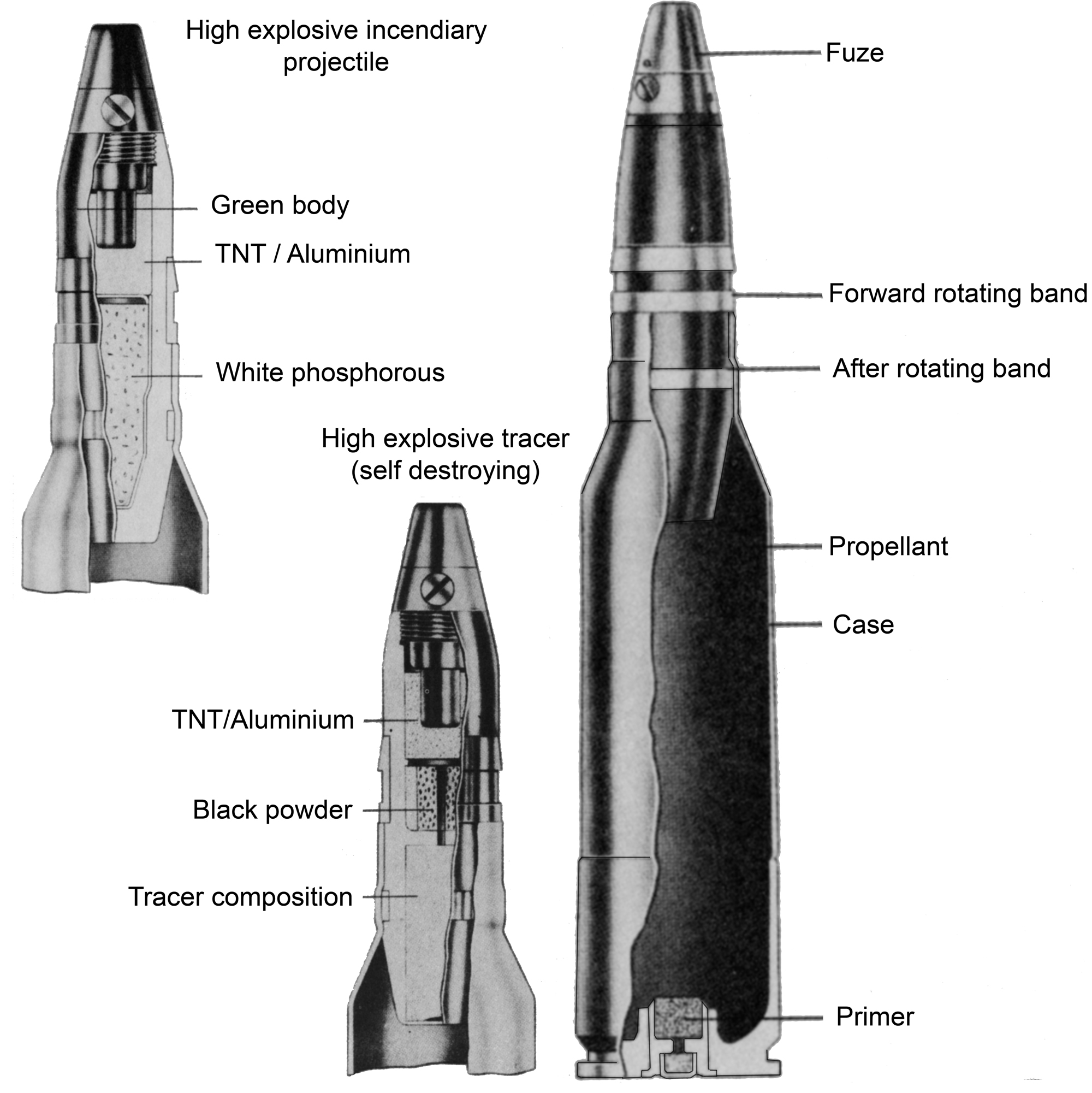
Japanese 25×163mm ammunition from a post-war US technical manual

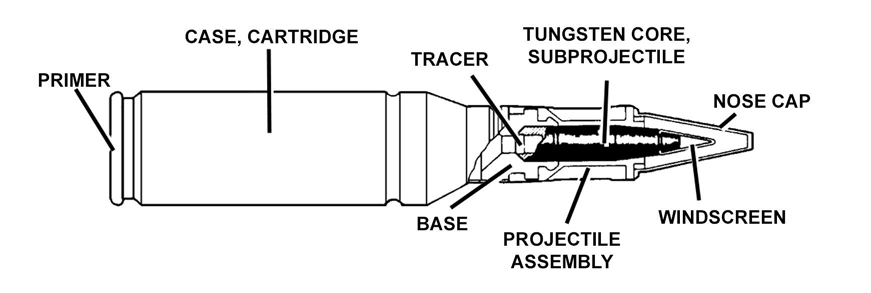
A diagram of the M791 25×137mm round

Several sub-types of the NATO 25 mm ammunition are available—the most common being armor-piercing, high-explosive, sabot, tracer, and practice rounds. Cartridges are usually composed of a combination of the aforementioned categories. For example, the M791 is an armor-piercing discarding sabot with tracer (APDS-T) round. It is used against lightly armored vehicles, self-propelled artillery, and aerial targets such as helicopters and slow-moving fixed-wing aircraft.

== 25 mm weapons ==
=== Current weapons ===
Weapon	Country of origin	Designer	Cartridge	Type
Oerlikon KBA	Switzerland	Rheinmetall AG	25×137mm	Autocannon
M242 Bushmaster	United States	Hughes Helicopters	25×137mm	Chain gun
GAU-12/22 Equalizer	United States	General Electric	25×137mm	Rotary cannon
GIAT M811	France	GIAT Industries	25×137mm	Autocannon
SENTINEL 20	Spain	Escribano	25×137mm	RWS
Oerlikon KBB	Switzerland	Rheinmetall AG	25×184mm	Autocannon
Oerlikon KBD	Switzerland	Rheinmetall AG	25×184mm	Autocannon
Type 61	China		25×218mmSR	Anti-aircraft autocannon
Type 95 SPAAA	China		25×183mmB	Anti-aircraft autocannon
ZPT-90	China		25×183mmB	Autocannon

=== Historical weapons ===
Weapon	Country of origin	Designer	Cartridge	Type
25 mm Hotchkiss anti-aircraft gun Type 96 25 mm AT/AA gun	France; Japan	Hotchkiss et Cie	25×163mm	anti-aircraft gun
25 mm Hotchkiss anti-tank gun	France	Hotchkiss et Cie	25×193.5mmR	anti-tank gun
25 mm automatic air defense gun M1940 (72-K)	Soviet Union	Bofors-redevelopment (Mikhail Loginov and Lev Loktev)	25×218mmSR	anti-aircraft gun
Bofors 25 mm automatic gun L/64	Sweden	Bofors	25×205mmR m/32 (initial) or 25×187mmR m/38 (later)	anti-aircraft gun

== See also ==
- 14.5×114mm
- 20 mm caliber
- 23 mm caliber
- 25 mm grenade
- 30 mm caliber
- List of cartridges (weaponry), pistol and rifle
