= Loginov =

Loginov (Russian: Логинов) and Loginova (Russian: Логинова; feminine) is a Russian surname. Notable people with the surname include:

- Albina Loginova (born 1983), Russian archer
- Alexander Loginov (born 1987), Russian ice hockey player
- Alexandr Loginov (born 1992), Russian biathlete
- Andrey Loginov (born 1972), Soviet middle distance runner
- Anna Loginova (1978–2008), Russian fashion model and bodyguard
- Anton Loginov (born Mikhail Osipovich Loginov, 1882–1963), Russian journalist, writer, and publicist
- Artem Loginov (born 1991), visually impaired Russian sprinter
- Denis Loginov (born 1985), Russian ice hockey player
- Diana Loginova, Russian singer
- Dmitry Loginov (born 2000), Russian snowboard
- Galina Loginova, Soviet actress
- Lidiya Loginova (born 1951), Russian volleyball player
- Mikhail Loginov (1903–1940), Soviet weapon designer
- Oleksandr Loginov (born 1992), Canadian swimmer
- Sergei Loginov (1963–2022), Russian footballer
- Svyatoslav Loginov, Russian science fiction writer
- Valery Loginov (born 1955), Russian and Uzbekistani chess grandmaster
- Vladimir Loginov (footballer), (born 1974), Kazakhstan football player
- Vladimir Loginov (ice hockey) (born 1981), Russian ice hockey player
- Vyacheslav Loginov (born 1979), Russian politician

== See also ==
- Loginovo
- Loginova (village), a village in Tyumen Oblast, Russia
