= Lev Loktev =

Soviet artillery designer (1908–1981)

Lev Abramovich Loktev
- Born: August 25, 1908; Kiev, Russian Empire
- Died: April 28, 1981 (aged 72)
- Occupation: Designer

Lev Abramovich Loktev (Russian: Лев Абрамович Ло́ктев; August 25, 1908 – April 28, 1981) was a Soviet artillery designer who served as the chief designer at Mikhail Kalinin Plant No. 8 in Podlipki, now part of Korolyov, Moscow Oblast.

== Early life ==
Lev Abramovich Loktev was born in Kiev as the smaller of the eight sons to a Jewish family. His father, Abram Solomonovich Loktev, and his grandfather were steam engine specialists in Kiev, and Abram Loktev created his own bicycle workshop in Kiev in 1912. Abram Loktev was killed when he participated in the First World War from a gas attack in 1918, when Lev Loktev was nine.

Lev Loktev graduated from secondary school in 1924 and entered a factory-school, the Mikhail Ratmansky school-plant with Yiddish teaching, while at the same time working as a machinist. After graduation Loktev entered the Kiev Polytechnic Institute where he studied for only a year before being sent to the military mechanical department of the Leningrad Machine-building Institute (LMI, now the Baltic State Technical University) by the Komsolmol, as part of a group of students, when the Soviet Union needed artillery designers.

== Career ==
Lev Loktev graduated from the Institute in 1933, defended his thesis and was sent to work at Plant No. 8 of the People's Commissariat of Armament of the USSR (the NKV) in Podlipki, where he designed his first successful piece of artillery. Many who had studied at the LMI became chief specialists and designers in the defense industry, among them Dmitry Ustinov (who would become the Minister of Defence in 1976), his deputy Vasily Ryabikov, Mark Olevsky and Naum Nosovsky. Ever since his first appearance at the plant Loktev had worked in an active role in designing artillery pieces. Loktev worked successively as a designer, designer-engineer, Deputy Head of Department, Head of Office, Senior Design-Engineer and Deputy Chief Designer.

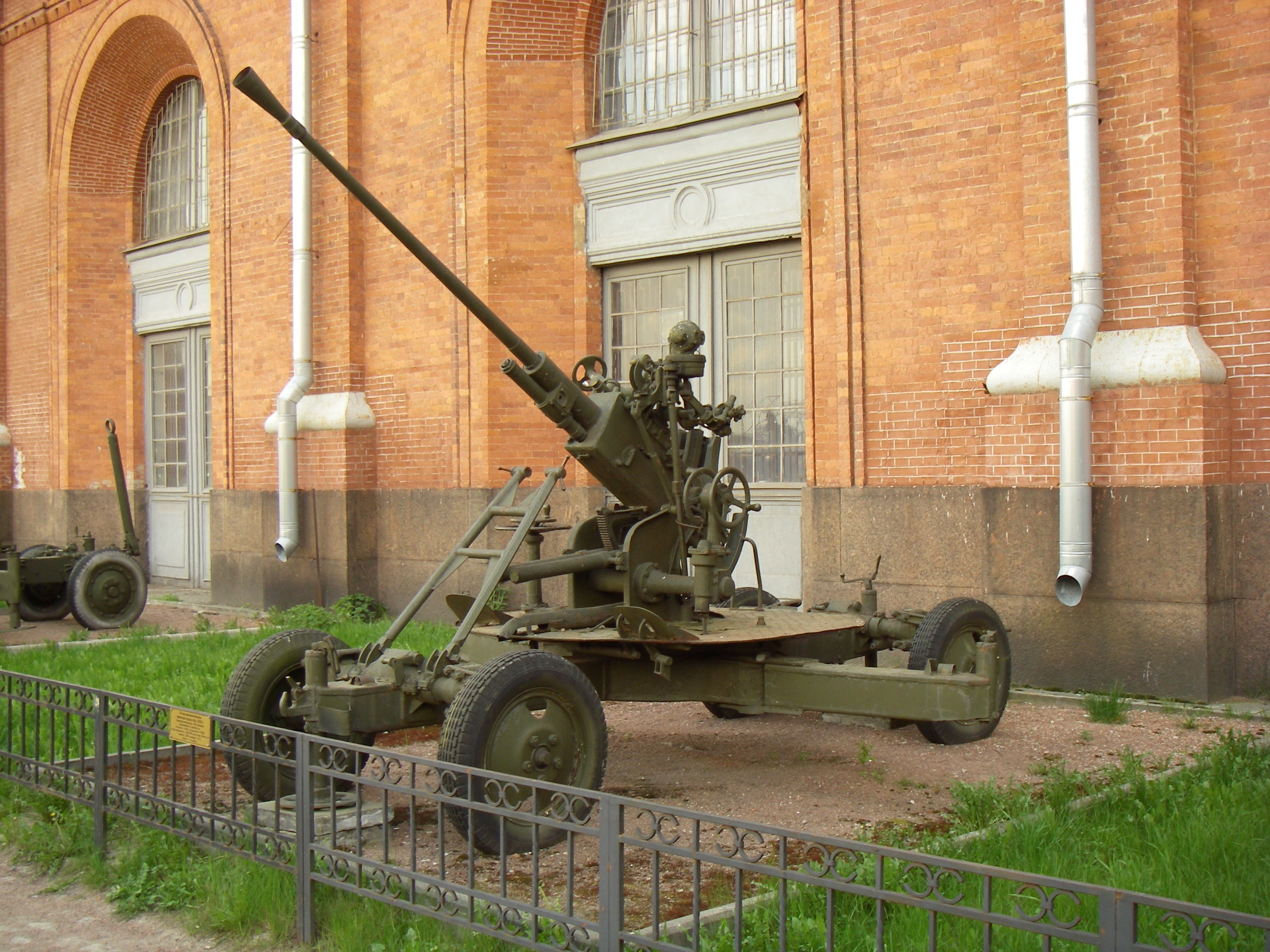
The 61-K air defense gun, one of the many works of Lev Loktev.

Loktev succeeded Mikhail Loginov as the latter died of tuberculosis in 1940 as the Chief Designer of Plant No. 8, after which he directed design work on the 37 mm 61-K anti-aircraft gun and the 25 mm 72-K anti-aircraft gun as well as a number of 37/45mm deck-mounted anti-aircraft guns and paired or turreted 37mm automatic anti-aircraft guns adopted by the Soviet Army and the Navy.

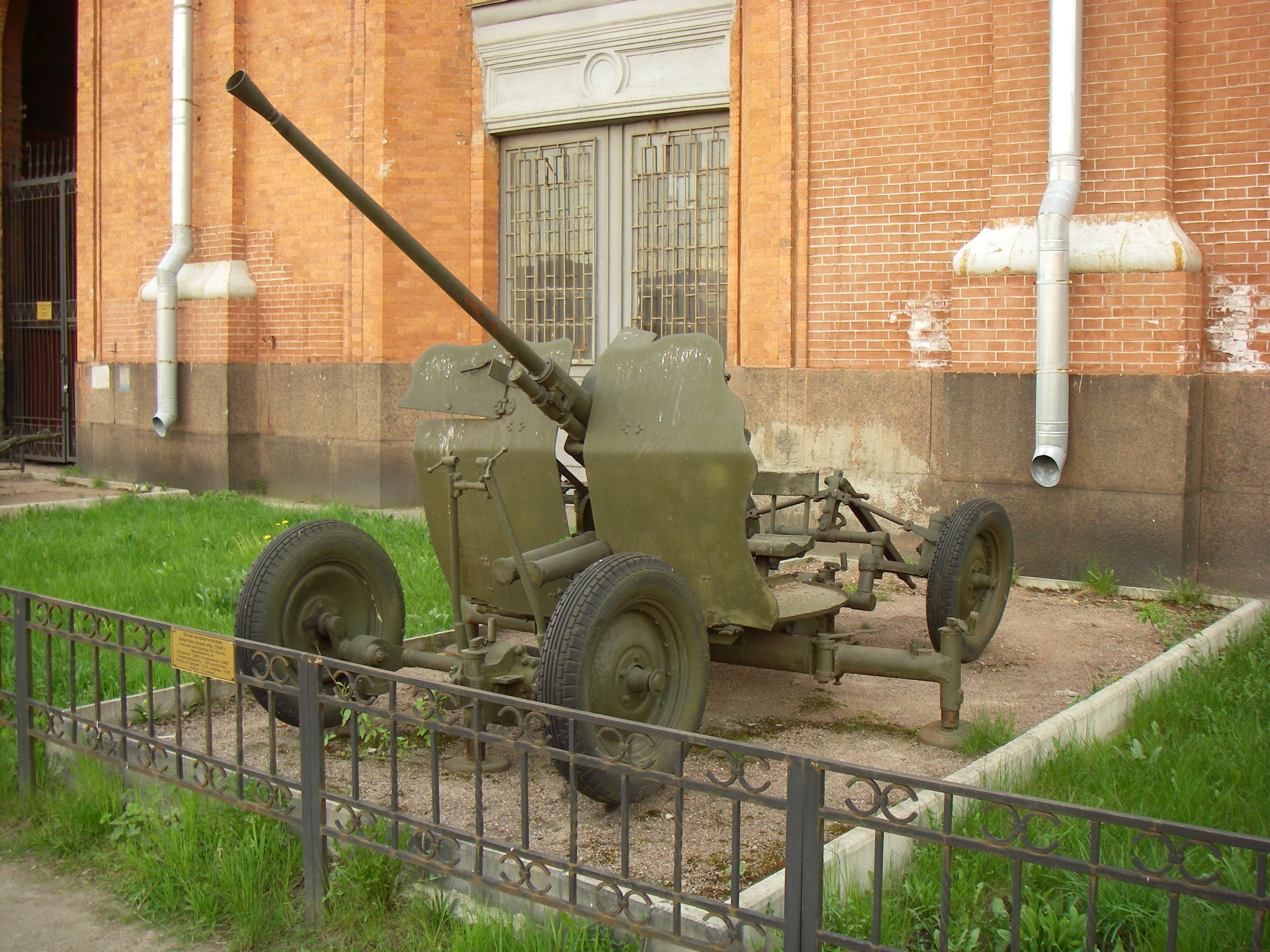
The 72-K anti-aircraft gun, one of the many works of Lev Loktev.

As Plant No. 8 was evacuated to Sverdlovsk, Perm and Botkinsk in 1941, Loktev took over the post of Deputy Chief Designer in Perm, and developed what would later serve as the basis for the AZP S-60 anti-aircraft gun. He returned to Kaliningrad (now Korolyov, Moscow Oblast) in December, 1942 as Chief Designer of the Plant before becoming Deputy Director and Chief Designer at NII-58. However, with NII-58 focusing on rocketry (in which Loktev was not interested), Loktev refused to take the post.

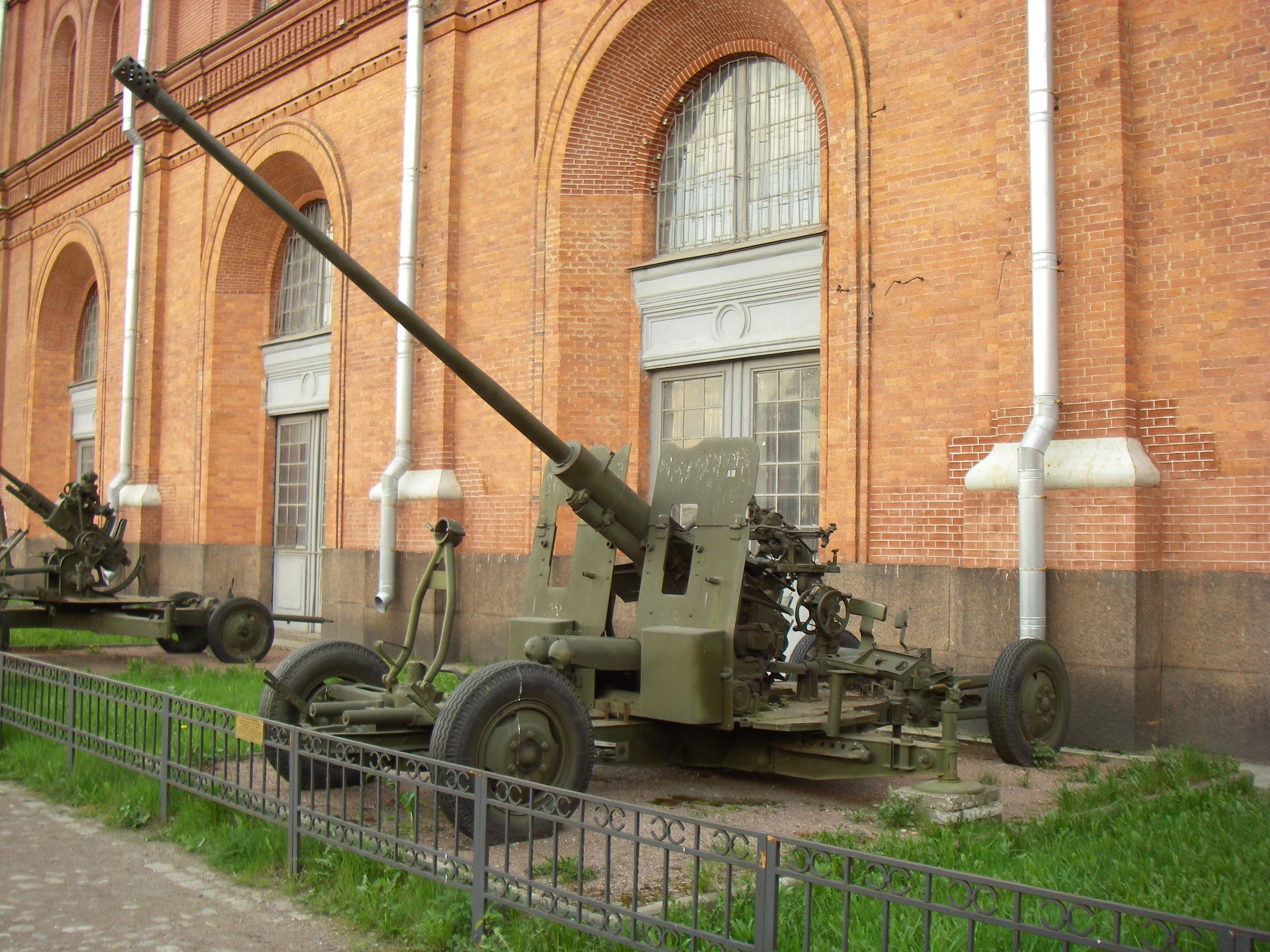
The S-60 anti-aircraft gun, one of the many works of Lev Loktev.

Loktev was transferred as a designer of the NKV to the Central Artillery Design Bureau (the TsAKB) as its Head of Department in July, 1943. The TsKAB was the successor to the NII-58, where its director was Vasily Grabin, after having re-based from Gorky Plant No.92 to Kaliningrad.

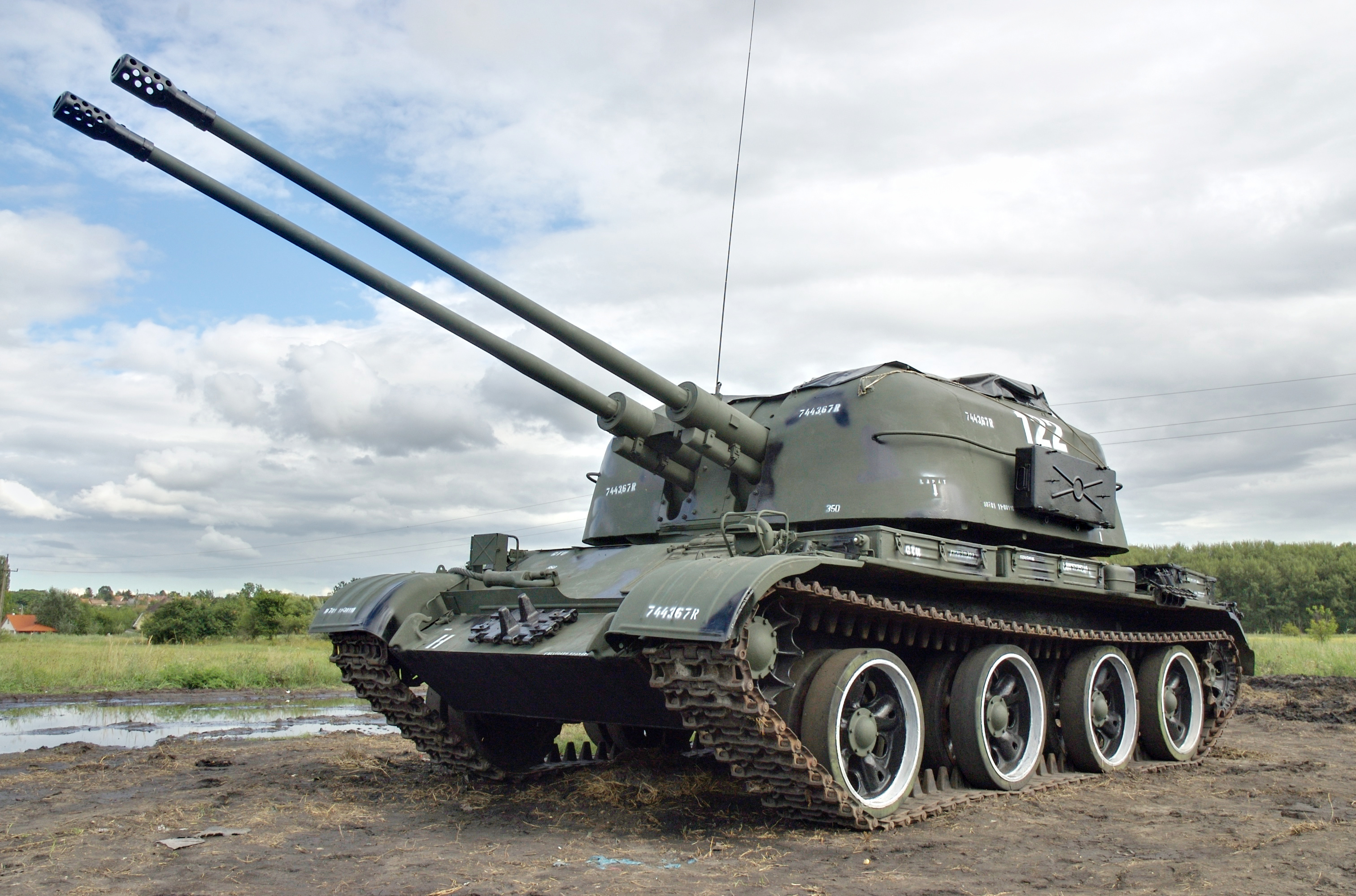
The ZSU-57-2. This self-propelled anti-aircraft gun (SPAAG) is still in service in a number of countries.

Following the AZP S-60 57mm autocannon, NII-58 (with Loktev) designed what would become the then-most powerful serial-production self-propelled anti-aircraft gun, the ZSU-57-2 (mounting dual 57mm S-68 cannons in one turret) in 1950. The ZSU-57-2 would also become a frequent sight at Red Square military parades.

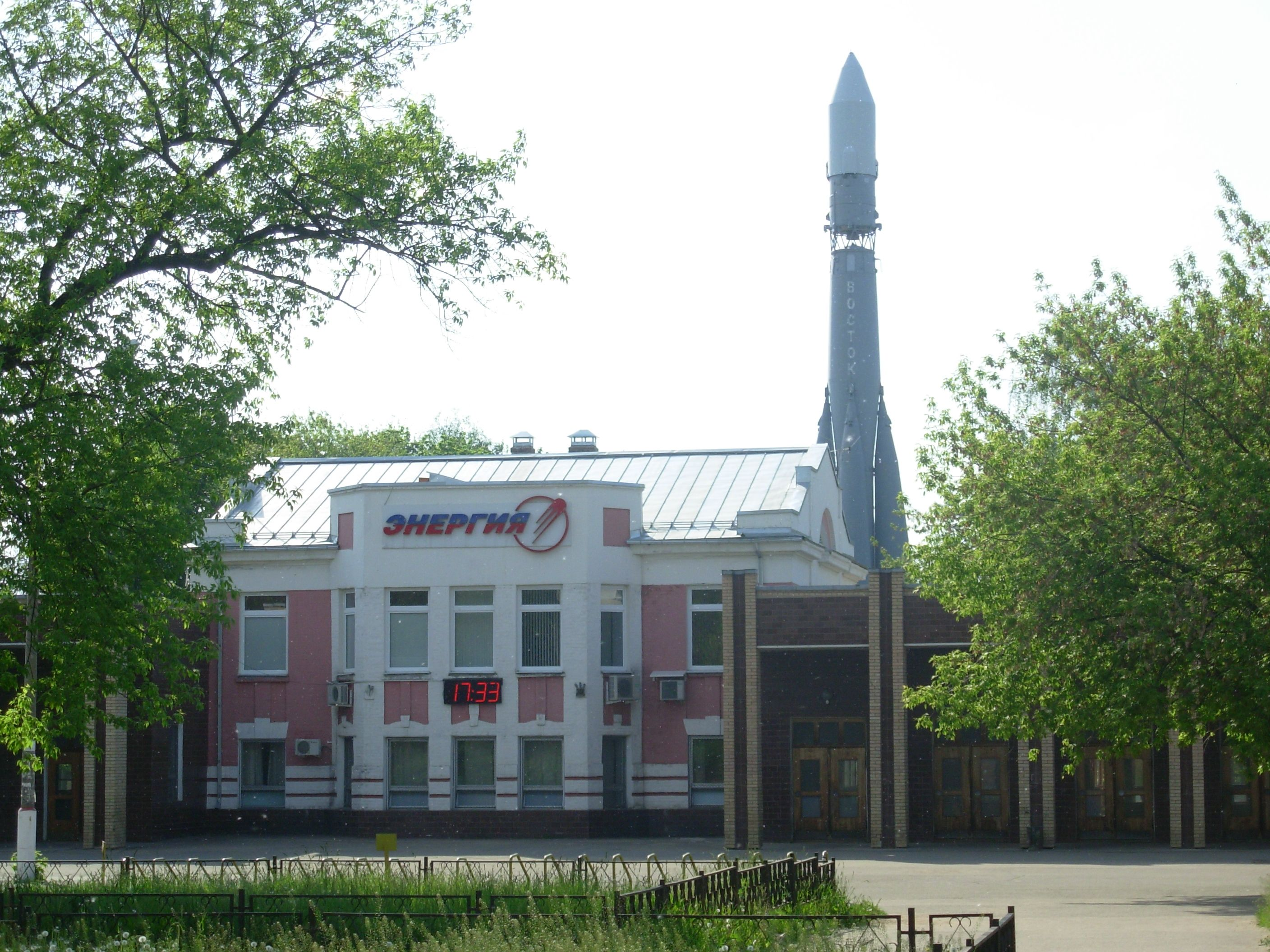
The enterprise of RKK Energia, where Loktev worked.

Following a decree by Nikita Khrushchev in 1959, work on developing artillery weapons throughout the USSR were cut so abruptly that design and technical documents were destroyed. In light of this and seeing no future, Loktev with his team moved from NII-58 to OKB-10 of NII-88, led by gunsmith Yevgeny Charnko (now RKK Energia and TsNIIMash, respectively), where he took active part in work initiated by Sergei Korolyov, and appealed to Charnko with a request to take over development work of underwater rocket launches via the use of R-11F liquid-propellant rockets.

The first stage of testing is a launch test from a surfaced submarine, which was completed under the joint leadership of Korolyov and A. P. Abramov. Though the Chief Designer of OKB-10 doubted the technical feasibility of an underwater rocket launch, American progress in this aspect was so provoking that the work had to continue.

Work on subsurface launches completed with three successful underwater launches in the White Sea near Severodvinsk. Soviet Navy representatives were satisfied, and a report on the test results was drafted. Korolyov spoke highly of this work, frankly admitting to Charnko that he had little faith in its success.

In 1959, with the technical feasibility of deep subsurface rocket launches now proved experimentally, recommendations of the implementation of such launch methods were written and design documents were corrected. Shortly after that Charnko and his deputy, A. Galkin were summoned to the Central Committee of the CPSU, where OKB-10 was offered to relocate to Miass for serial work deployment. Charnko, suffering a heart attack, refused the offer, considering that the work can be done in Kaliningrad, and his team followed suit, refusing to relocate. Despite this situation, with high appreciation on the work done in the field of underwater launches, the Director of NII-88, Alexey Spiridonov, nominated it for the Lenin Prize. However, the "stubbornness" of Charnko and his team was punished--the nomination did not go through and the Prize was not awarded. OKB-10 was soon transferred to under the lead of Sergei Korolyov under the supervision of his deputy, I. P. Sadovsky, who was engaged in developing solid-propellant rockets. Loktev worked here until his retirement.

== Retirement and death ==
Loktev retired with pension in December, 1969, and died on April 28, 1981. He was buried in Vagankovo Cemetery, Plot No. 16.

== Comments ==
Mark Olevsky, then Chief Engineer of Gorky No. 92, the largest artillery factory in 1940, commented on Loktev:

Thanks to his deep theoretical knowledge, great diligence and preserverance, L. Loktev very soon began to stand out among his peers. It was his Chief Designer of Plant No. 8 M. Loginov that made him his deputy, and in times of frequent illnesses of Loginov (he had tuberculosis, from which he died young) L. Loktev performed the duties of Chief Designer. L. Loktev, already a soon-to-be Deputy Chief Designer, then Chief Designer, has remained very approachable. There was not a single day that he didn't come to work. Workers did not have to run after him, nor had the meteoric career change the demeanor of L. Loktev.

— Mark Olevsky

Loktev and his work was also mentioned in History of Russian Artillery (1964), 50 years of the Armed Forces of the USSR (1968), and on the 70th anniversary of his birth, Soviet magazine Equipment and Weapons.

== Awards ==
- Stalin Prize 2nd degree (1941) for work on new models of artillery (the 37 mm automatic air defense gun M1939 (61-K))
- Stalin Prize 2nd degree (1943) for development on a new type of artillery (the 25 mm automatic air defense gun M1940 (72-K))

Stalin Prize 1st degree (1950) for work in the field of weaponry (the AZP S-60)

- Lenin Prize
- Order of Lenin
- Order of the Red Star

== See also ==
- Arsenal Machine-Building Plant
- Mikhail Loginov
