= Vladimir Loginov =

Vladimir Loginov may refer to:

- Vladimir Loginov (footballer), (born 1974), retired Kazakhstan football forward
- Vladimir Loginov (ice hockey) (born 1981), Russian ice hockey player
- Vladimir Loginov (revolutionary) (1897–1937), Russian revolutionary
- Vladimir Loginov (politician) (1954–2016), Russian politician, governor of Koryak Autonomous Okrug (2000–2005)
