= Lohinov =

Lohinov is a Ukrainian surname. Notable people with the surname include:

- Oleksandr Lohinov (born 1991), Ukrainian football player
- Serhiy Lohinov (born 1990), Ukrainian football player

== See also ==
- Loginov
