= 37 mm automatic air defense gun M1939 (61-K) =

Soviet anti-aircraft gun

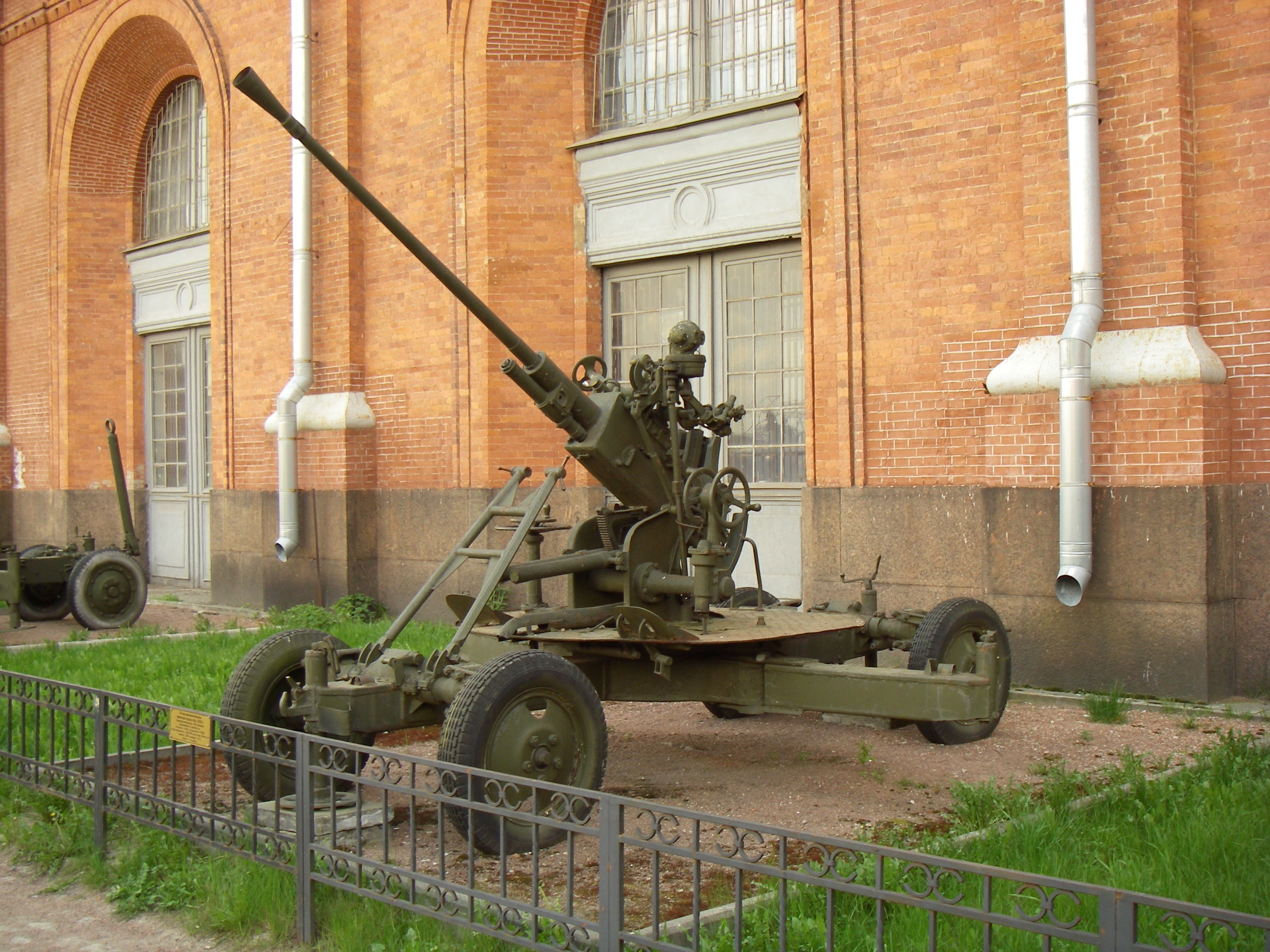
- 61-K in Saint Petersburg Artillery Museum
- Type: Anti-aircraft gun Autocannon
- Place of origin: Soviet Union

Service history
- In service: 1939–present
- Used by: See Users
- Wars: List of conflicts: World War II; First Indochina War; Korean War; Vietnam War; Laotian Civil War; Cambodian Civil War; Cambodian–Vietnamese War; Sino-Vietnamese War; Portuguese Colonial War; Somali Civil War; South African Border War; Lebanese Civil War; Syrian Civil War; Yemeni Civil War (2015–present); Saudi Arabian-led intervention in Yemen; Tigray War

Production history
- Manufacturer: Podolsk Mechanical Plant
- Produced: 1939–1945 (USSR)
- No. built: 20,000 (USSR)

Specifications
- Mass: 2,100 kg (4,600 lb)
- Barrel length: 2.5 m (8 ft 2 in) L/67
- Crew: 8
- Shell: 37×252mmSR
- Shell weight: 730 g (1.61 lb) Frag-T; 770 g (1.70 lb) AP-T
- Caliber: 37 mm (1.5 in)
- Recoil: Hydro-spring
- Carriage: Four-wheeled with twin outriggers
- Elevation: −5° to 85°
- Traverse: 360°
- Rate of fire: 160–170 rpm
- Muzzle velocity: 880 m/s (2,900 ft/s)
- Effective firing range: 4 km (13,000 ft) (effective ceiling)
- Maximum firing range: 5 km (16,000 ft) (maximum ceiling)

The 37 mm automatic air defense gun M1939 (61-K) (Russian: 37-мм автоматическая зенитная пушка образца 1939 года (61-К)) is a Soviet 37 mm calibre anti-aircraft gun developed during the late 1930s and used during World War II. The land-based version was replaced in Soviet service by the AZP S-60 during the 1950s. Guns of this type were successfully used throughout the Eastern Front against dive bombers and other low- and medium-altitude targets. It also had some usefulness against lightly armoured ground targets.

== Development ==
The Soviet Navy purchased a number of Bofors 25 mm Model 1933 guns in 1935, trials of the weapon were successful, and it was decided to develop a 45 mm version of the weapon designated the 49-K. The development under the guidance of leading Soviet designers M. N. Loginov, I. A. Lyamin and L. V. Lyuliev was successful, but the army thought that the 45 mm calibre was a little too large for an automatic field weapon. In January 1938 the Artillery Factory Number 8 in Sverdlovsk was ordered to develop a 37 mm weapon based on the same design. The task was fulfilled by the chief designer of the factory, Mikhail Loginov, and his assistant Lev Loktev. Firing trials of the new 61-K were conducted in October 1938.

Competitive firing trials were conducted in 1940 between the 61-K and the Bofors 40 mm/56. There were no substantial differences found between them.

=== Land version ===
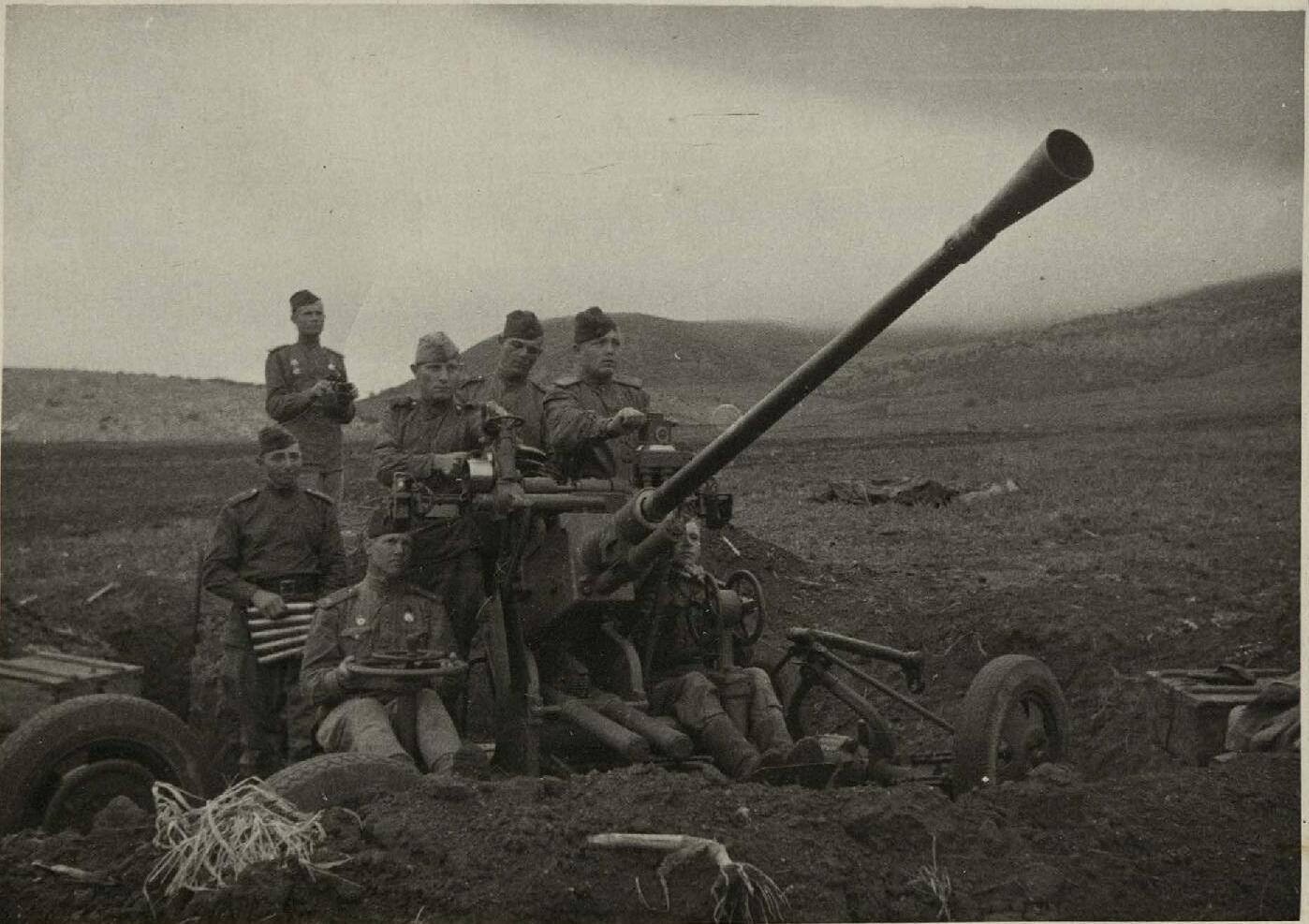
61-K of the Soviet 210th Guards Anti-Aircraft Artillery Regiment PVO in Crimea, May 1944

The weapon was initially installed as a single-barrel weapon on a four-wheeled ZU-7 carriage and was soon ready for service. An initial order for 900 units was placed. The gun was operated by a crew of eight men. A total of 200 rounds of ammunition were carried which were fed into the gun in five-round clips. Total Soviet production was around 20,000 units, ending in 1945. However, it has also been produced in Poland, China and North Korea.

Armour penetration of the armour-piercing (AP) rounds is reported as 37 millimetres of rolled homogeneous armour (RHA) at 60°at 500 metres range and 28 millimetres of RHA at 90° at 1,500 metres range.

=== Naval version ===
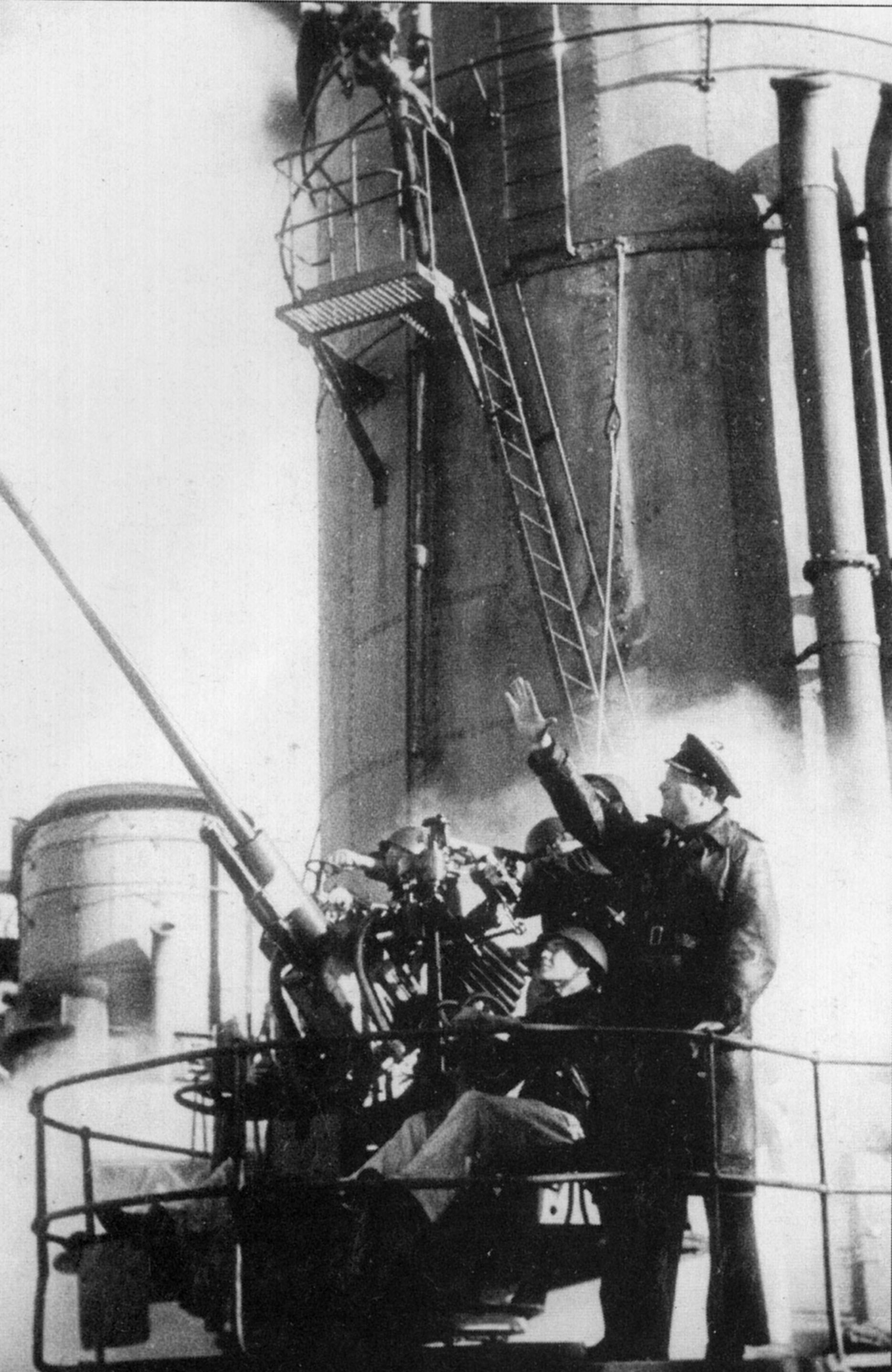
70-K on the Soviet cruiser Krasny Kavkaz

The naval mounting was produced as the 70-K and had entered service before the German invasion of the Soviet Union replacing the semi-automatic 45 mm/46 21-K on many ships. It was fitted in large numbers to Soviet ships during the Second World War, including the T301 class minesweeper. The 70-K was produced until 1955, with a total of 3,113 built.

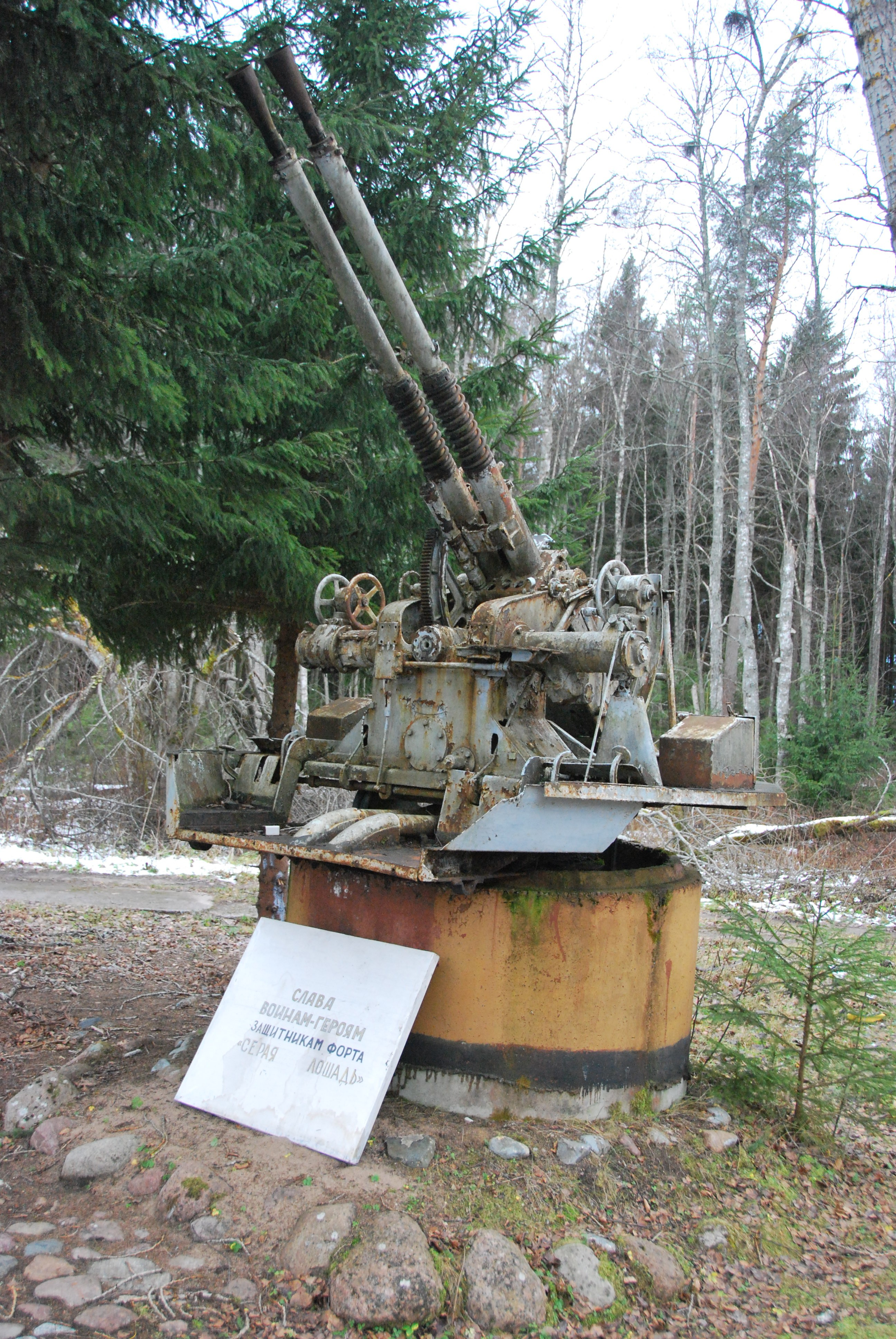
V-11 as a memorial to the defenders of Seraya Loshad fort

One drawback was that the 70-K required a barrel change after every 100 rounds fired. To improve on this, a twin-barrel water cooled mount, the V-11 (called "W-11" in East Germany and Poland because of different Cyrillic transliteration), entered service in 1946, and was in production until 1957. A total of 1,872 V-11 mounts were built.

After this an 85-calibre 100 mm (3.9 in) anti-aircraft mounts long version, the 45 mm/85, was developed and accepted into service in 1954, it was deployed in twin and quad turrets on a number of classes of vessels, including the Neustrashimy, Kildin and Kotlin-class destroyers. However, it was later replaced with the ZIF-31 twin 57 mm mounting.

The 37 mm twin mounting was exported to China where it was manufactured and used extensively, as the "Type 65". A turret-based version was produced from the late 1980s called the "Type 76" or H/PJA 76.

=== ZSU-37 ===
The ZSU-37 was developed late in the Second World War, it was a single 37 mm gun mounted in a large open turret on the chassis of the SU-76 self-propelled gun.

== Specifications ==
Designation	M1939	70-K (naval)	V-11-M (naval)	45 mm (naval)
Barrels	1	1	2	4 or 2
Calibre	37 mm (1.45 in)			
Barrel length	2.73 m (9 ft)	2.3 m (7.54 ft)	2.3 m (7.54 ft)	3.8 m (12.46 ft)
Muzzle velocity	880 m/s (2,887 ft/s)			900 m/s (2,953 ft/s)
Weight	2,100 kg (4,630 lbs)	1,750 kg (3,858 lbs)	3,450 kg (7,606 lbs)	?
Length	5.5 m (18 ft)	3.8 m (12.46 ft)	3.8 m (12.46 ft)	6 m (19.68 ft)
Width	1.79 m (5.87 ft)	2.2 m (7.21 ft)	2.75 m (9 ft)	
Height	2.11 m (7 ft)	2.2 m (7.21 ft)	1.8 m (6 ft)	
Elevation	+85 to −5 degrees	+85 to −10 degrees	+85 to −10 degrees	+90 to 0 degrees
Elevation speed	?	15 degrees / sec	13 degrees / sec	?
Traverse speed	?	20 degrees / sec	17 degrees / sec	?
Rate of fire per barrel
(cyclic)	160 to 170 rpm	160 to 170 rpm	160 to 170 rpm	135 to 160 rpm
(practical)	80 rpm		320 rpm for all 2 barrels	100 rpm
Maximum range (surface)	9,500 m (5.90 mi)			?
Practical range (surface)	4,000 m (2.48 mi)			9,000 m
Maximum range (air)	6,700 m (21,981 ft)			?
Practical range (air)	3,000 m (9,842 ft)			6,000 m
Crew	8	6	3	4

- Recoil length: 150 to 175 mm

== Ammunition ==
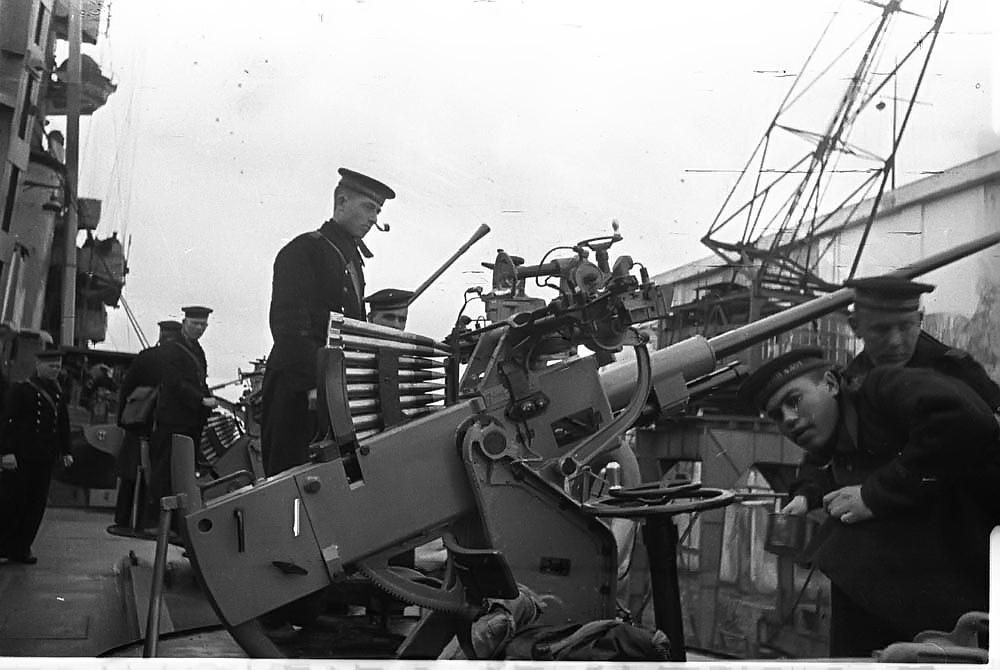
Five-round clips of 37×252mmSR ammunition being fed into 37 mm 70-K anti-aircraft guns (two clips at a time) aboard the Soviet cruiser Krasny Krym, 1942 or 1943

The cannon fires 37×252mmSR shells. The shells use brass cases lined with waxed paper and use KV-2U percussion primers. A small piece of lead-tin wire is included in the case to act as a de-coppering agent, to counteract the buildup of copper from the driving bands of the projectiles. The ammunition is produced in a number of countries including China, Russia, Egypt, Pakistan and Yugoslavia. The projectiles themselves are identical to those fired by the NS-37 aircraft cannon. The explosive shells are fitted with point detonating fuzes making them unsuitable for engaging fast moving or small targets.

Type	Frag-T	Frag-T	AP-T	HVAP	HE
Calibre	37 mm	37 mm	37 mm	37 mm	45 mm
Country	Russia				
Name	OR-167	OR-167N	BR-167	BR-167P	?
Fuze	MG-8 PD or MG-37 PD	B-37 PD or MG-37 PD	n/a	n/a	?
Round	1.43 kg (3.15 lbs)	1.43 kg (3.15 lbs)	1.47 kg (3.24 lbs)	?	
Projectile	732 g (1.43 lbs)	735 g (1.43 lbs)	770 g (1.62 lbs)	620 g (1.36 lbs)	1.5 kg (3.30 lbs)
Explosive	35 g (1.23 oz) of A-IX-2	40 g (1.41 oz) of A-IX-2 or A-1Kh-2	n/a	n/a	?
Muzzle velocity	880 m/s (2,887 ft/s)			960 m/s (3,150 ft/s)	900 m/s (2,953 ft/s)
Armour penetration	?	?	47 mm @ 500 m (1.85 in @ 547 yds); 37 mm @ 1,000 m (1.45 in @ 1,093 yds)	57 mm @ 1000 m (2.24 in @ 1,093 yds)	?

== Variants ==
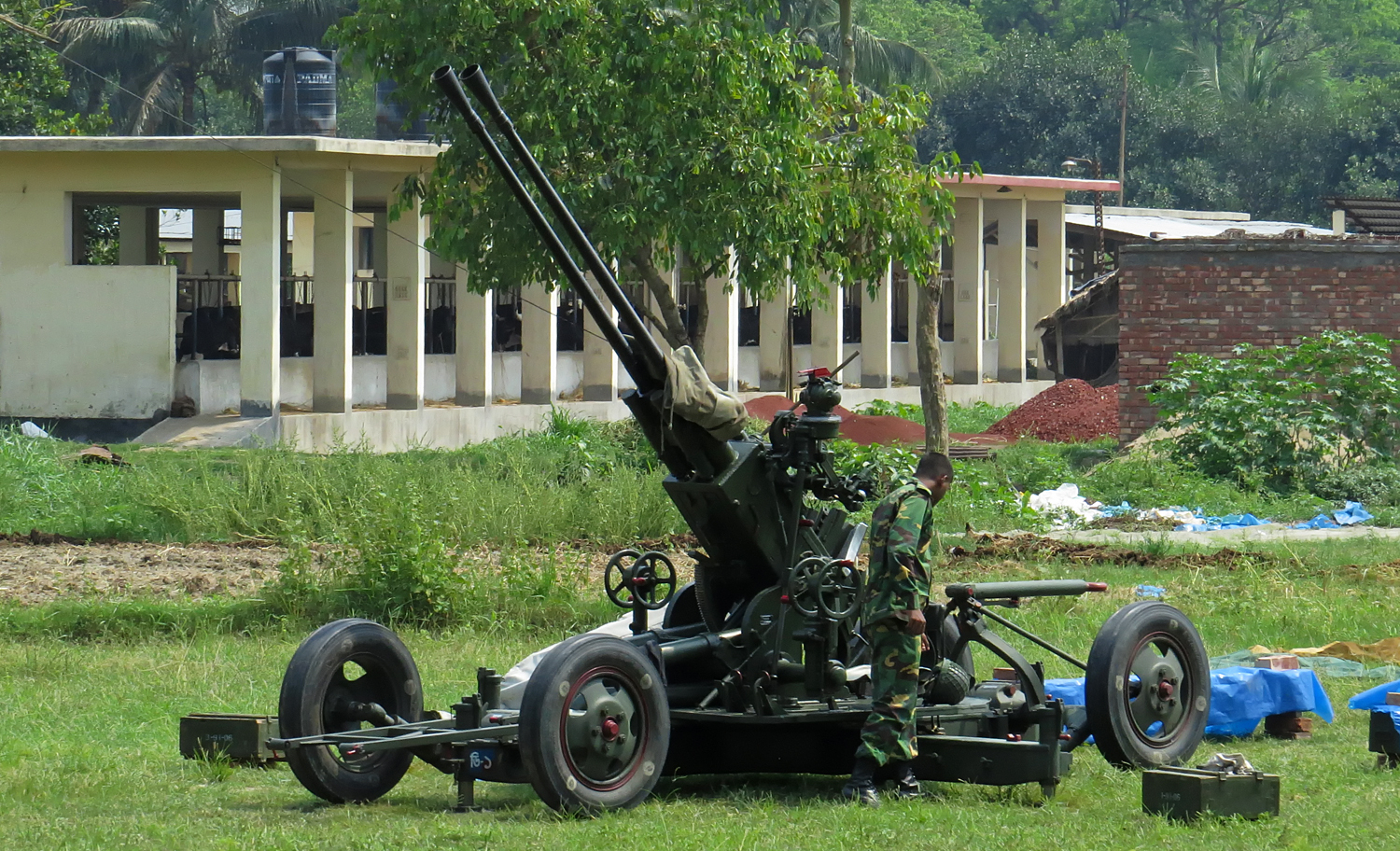
Type 74 of Bangladesh Army

- Norinco (Chinese)
  - Type 55 – towed single-barreled 37 mm, copy of the M1939 (61-K)
  - Type 63/65 – self-propelled twin 37 mm gun based on the T-34-85 chassis.
  - Type 65 – towed twin-barreled 37 mm, copy of the M1939 (61-K)
  - Type 74 – towed twin-barreled 37 mm, upgrade of the towed Type 65, with a greater rate of fire.
  - Type 74SD – Type 74 with servo system removed for operation with Type 800 laser course director system.
  - Type 79-III – upgraded version of the Type 74 with electro-optical director, and powered traverse and elevation.
  - Type 76 – Naval version of the twin 37 mm.
  - P793 – Advanced twin-barrel version, with electro-optical predicting sight and higher rate of fire and lengthened barrels giving a higher muzzle velocity (1,000 m/s). Operated by a crew of 5 or 6.
- North Korea
  - Self-propelled version

== Comparison of anti-aircraft guns ==
Country	Gun model	RPM	Projectile weight	Weight of fire
Soviet Union	37 mm automatic air defense gun M1939 (61-K)	80	.73 kg (1.6 lb)	58.4 kg (129 lb)
Nazi Germany	3.7 cm SK C/30	30	.74 kg (1.6 lb)	22.2 kg (49 lb)
France	Canon de 37 mm Modèle 1925	15–21	.72 kg (1.6 lb)	10.8–15.12 kg (23.8–33.3 lb)
Italy	Cannone-Mitragliera da 37/54 (Breda)	60–120	.82 kg (1.8 lb)	49.2–98.4 kg (108–217 lb)
United States	37 mm Gun M1	90	.61 kg (1.3 lb)	54.9 kg (121 lb)
Nazi Germany	3.7 cm Flak 18/36/37/43	150	.64 kg (1.4 lb)	96 kg (212 lb)
United Kingdom	QF 2-pounder naval gun	115	.82 kg (1.8 lb) or .91 kg (2.0 lb)	104.6 kg (231 lb)
Sweden	Bofors 40 mm gun	120	.9 kg (2.0 lb)	108 kg (238 lb)

== Operators ==
=== Current ===
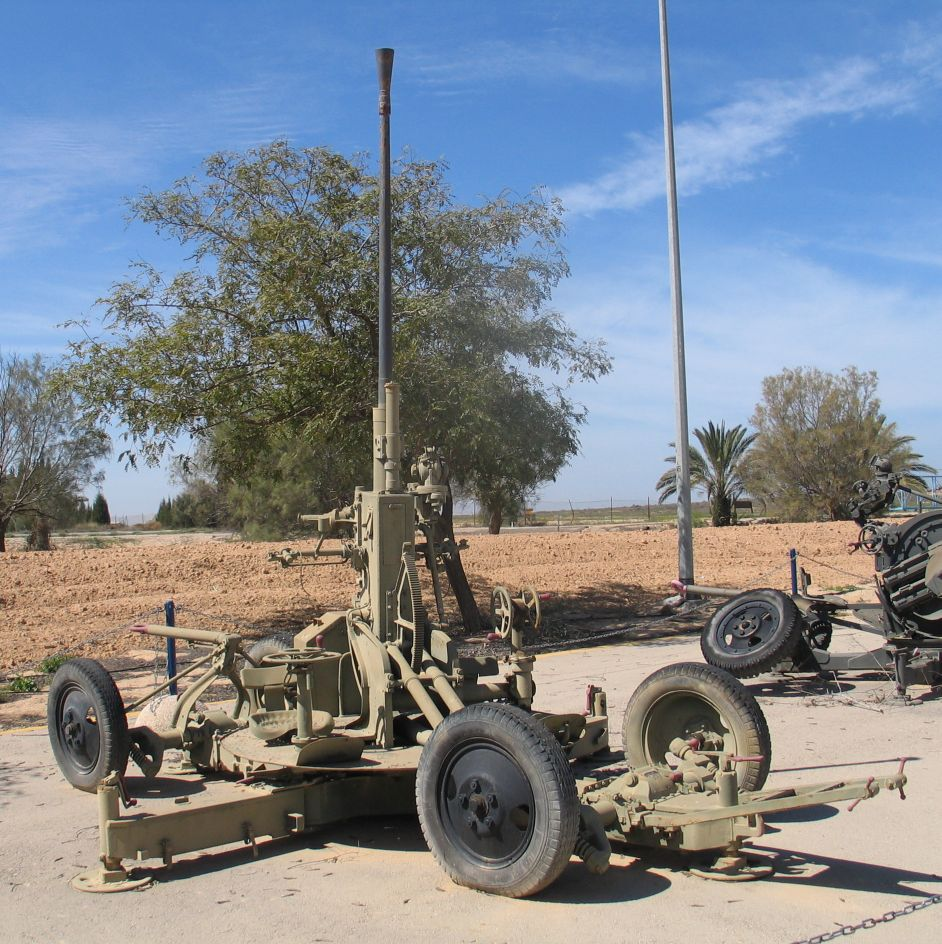
61-K at IDF/AF Museum, Chatzerim airbase, Israel

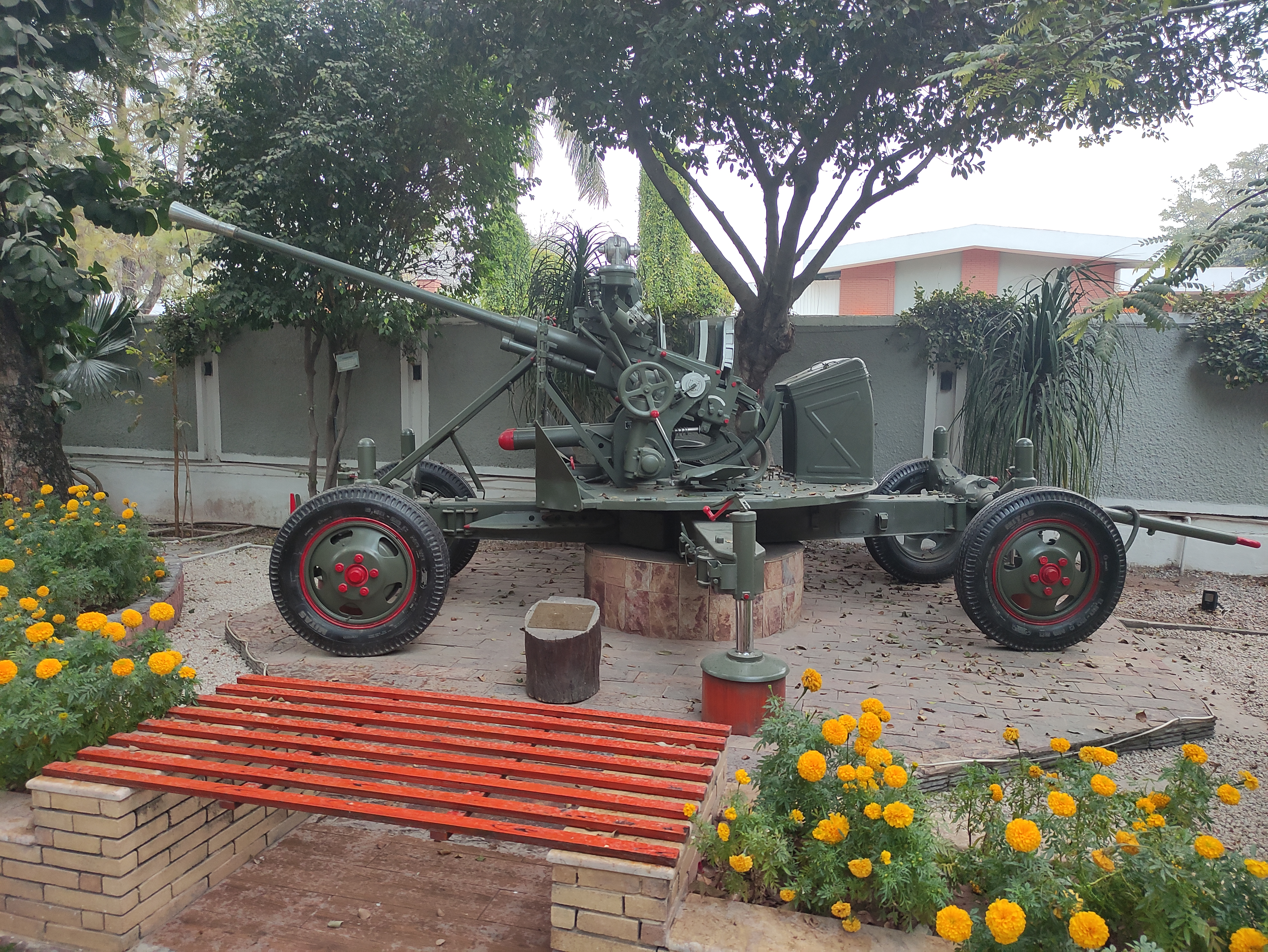
Pakistani Type-65

- Angola
- Algeria: ~150
- Bosnia and Herzegovina: 7 Type 55
- Bangladesh: 132 Type 65/74
- Bolivia: 18 Type 65
- Burundi: Type 55
- Cambodia
- Cameroon: 18 Type 63
- China
- Republic of the Congo: 28
- Democratic Republic of the Congo: 51
- Cuba
- Egypt
- Ethiopia
  - Tigray Defense Forces: Chinese variants
- Gabon: 10
- Guinea: 8
- Guinea-Bissau: 6
- Iran
- Israel
- North Korea
- Laos
- Madagascar: 20 Type 55
- Mauritania: 10
- Mozambique: <100
- Myanmar: 24 Type 74
- Nepal
- Pakistan: 310 Type 55/Type 65
- Seychelles
- South Sudan: Type 65/Type 74
- Sudan: Type 63 and M1939
- Sri Lanka
- Syria
  - People's Defense Units (YPG)
- Tanzania: 120
- Thailand: 52 Type 74
- Togo: 5
- Tunisia: 15 Type 55/Type 65
- Uganda: 20
- Vietnam
- Zambia: 40
- Zimbabwe: 35

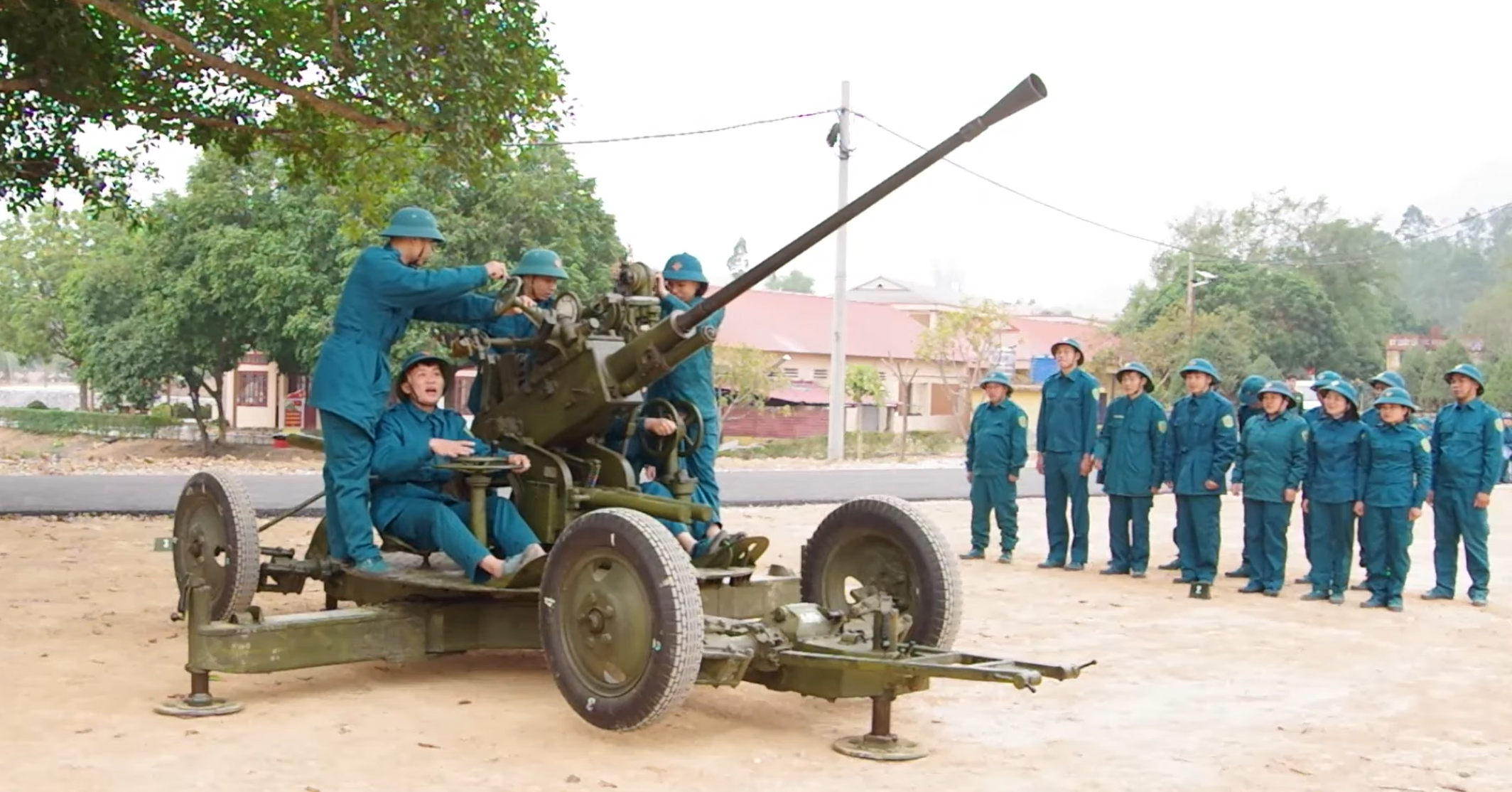
Vietnamese militia practicing with a 61-K

=== Former ===
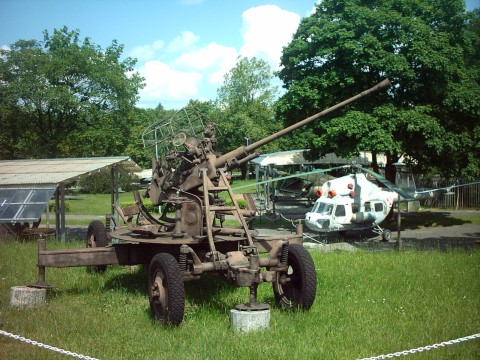
61-K in Poznan citadel, Poland

- Afghanistan
- Albania
- Bulgaria: 257 units were received in 1945-1948
- East Germany
- Finland
- Georgia
- Indonesia
- Iraq
- Islamic State: Type 65
- Morocco
- Mali
- Mongolia
- Nicaragua
- North Yemen: 100 ordered from Czechoslovakia in 1956
- Poland
- Romania
- Soviet Union
- Somalia
- Yugoslavia
- Zaire

== See also ==
- List of weapons of the Lebanese Civil War
- Weapons of the Laotian Civil War
