= 45 mm anti-tank gun M1937 (53-K) =

45 mm anti-tank gun model 1937 (53-K)
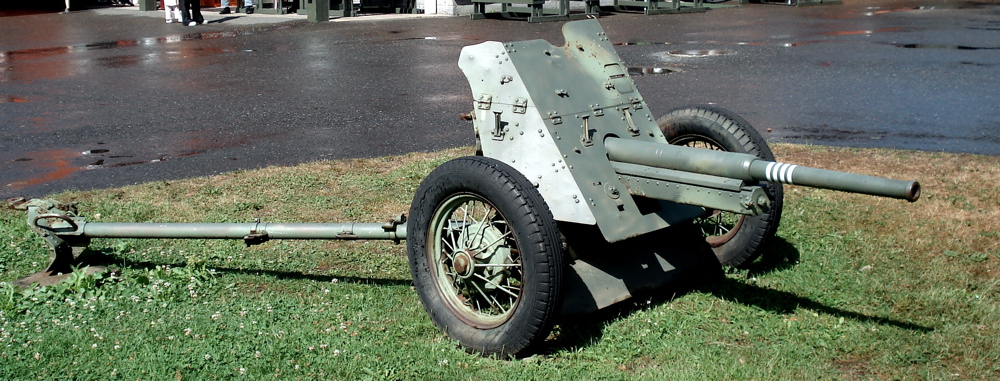
- 45 mm anti-tank gun M1937, displayed in Finnish Tank Museum in Parola.
- Type: Anti-tank gun
- Place of origin: Soviet Union

Production history
- Produced: 1937–1943
- No. built: 37,354

Specifications
- Mass: combat: 560 kg (1,234 lbs) travel: 1,200 kg (2,645 lbs)
- Length: 6.4 m (21 ft 0 in)
- Barrel length: 2.07 m (6 ft 9 in) 46 calibers
- Shell: Fixed QF 45×310 mm. R
- Caliber: 45 mm (1.77 in)
- Breech: Semi-automatic vertical sliding-wedge
- Recoil: Hydro-spring
- Carriage: Split-trail
- Elevation: −8° to 25°
- Traverse: 60°
- Rate of fire: 15–20 rpm
- Muzzle velocity: 760 m/s (2,493 ft/s)
- Maximum firing range: 4.4 km (2.73 mi)

The 45 mm anti-tank gun model 1937 (factory designation 53-K, GRAU index 52-P-243-PP-1), nicknamed the Sorokapyatka (from Russian сорокапятка, or "little forty-five"), was a light quick-firing anti-tank gun used in the first stage of the German-Soviet War. It was created by Soviet artillery designer M.N. Loginov of Plant No. 8 (now Kalinin Machine-Building Plant) after the arrest and execution of former designer V. von Behring. Due to insufficient armor penetration it was replaced in service by the longer-barreled M-42 in 1942. Production of the gun ceased in 1943 with a total of 37,354 units built from 1937 to 1943.

== History ==
The 53-K was essentially an improved version 19-K anti-tank gun mounted on a 37 mm 1-K anti-tank gun chassis (itself a licensed copy of the 3.7 cm Pak 36) using modern ammunition. Other improvements comprised semi-automatic breech, sight, firing button, suspension, reliable shield mount, and movable part re-balancing. The sum of evolutionary improvements resulted in a significantly different design to justify the new factory code (53-K).

The then-experimental gun went to the NIAP after factory testings were completed. It fired a total of 897 shells and traveled a total of 684 km for the entire testing duration from August to September 1937. Despite passing firing tests, suspension springs of the gun broke during travel tests.

A further experimental series of 6 pieces were built in November 1937, which bore a number of improvements from the original design. The 1st, 2nd, 3rd, 4th and the 6th guns were sent to military testing, while the 5th gun was retained for the plant's own use. The guns underwent factory testing from December 1937 to January 1938.

The 3rd gun (barrel number 0734) was sent with a Ya-3 limber was sent to the NIAP, arriving on 28 January, having already fired 605 shots during factory tests. NIAP staff then took the gun apart before improperly re-assembling the gun, which caused some parts to be damaged.

The gun fired 1217 shells (798 of them armor-piercing and 419 high explosive shells). Both the original design and the improved, 7 November 1936-finalized M1937 design had identical rates of fire when fired manually without gunnery correction, while the M1937 design fired faster than the M1932 when mechanically fired via a pushbutton, at 13% for AP and 6% for HE shells. Throughout the test the gun had 16 misfires, 13 of them when firing AP and 3 when firing HE, partly associated with shell casing quality. The recoil mechanism screw broke after the 281st shot, but the automation mechanism was generally viewed as satisfactory.

The M1937 then traveled a total of 2074 km during travel tests at a travel speed of 30–35 km/h on cobblestone roads, 50–60 km/h on paved roads, and 15–30 km/h off-road without a limber.

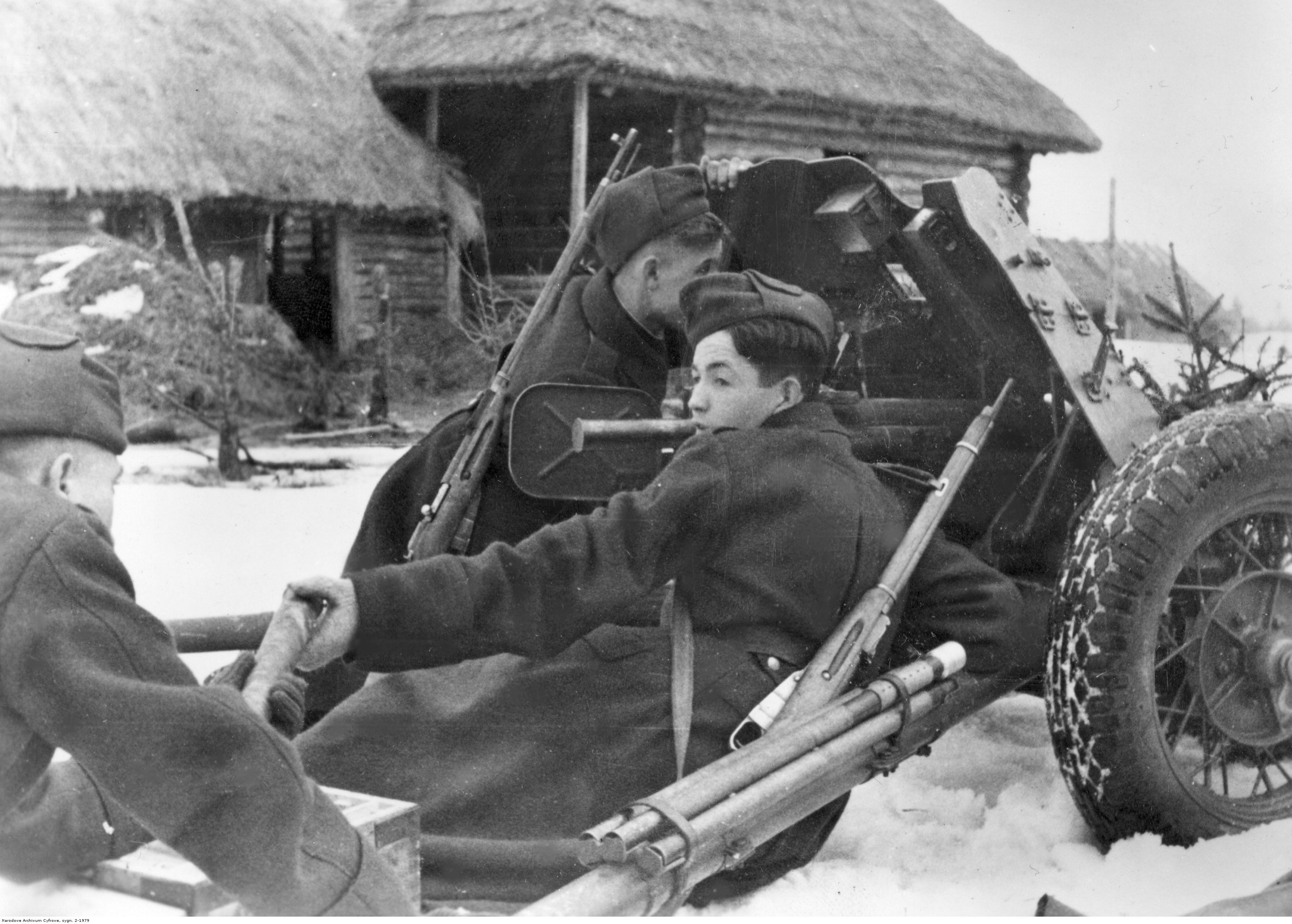
Wehrmacht or Waffen-SS foreign volunteers on the Eastern Front armed with captured Soviet Mosin–Nagant rifles and a 45 mm anti-tank gun, 1943

Three 53-K guns (Nos. 1, 2 and 4) were sent to military testing in early 1938 with Ya-3 limbers. Six T-20 Komsomolets artillery tractors also participated in the tests. The guns fired on average 450 shells without failures, and traveled from Moscow via Kharkov to Krasnodar. The gun was cleared for production after minor defects were fixed, and was accepted into service as the 45 mm anti-tank gun M1937 on 24 April 1938. Production ceased at the Kalinin plant on 6 June 1938, but Plant 235 continued production all the way until 1944. The 53-K was simple and inexpensive (approximately 10,000 rubles for each gun) to produce.

In addition to serving in the Red Army, 53-K guns were also supplied to Republican Spain and were used by the International Brigades in the British Anti-tank Battery of the XV Brigade, who served from the Battle of Brunete onwards. Richard Baxell notes that the gun in Spain "was effective against even heavy tanks at distances of up to three kilometers." The guns also saw service in first stage of the German-Soviet War, but their anti-armor capabilities allowed them to fight successfully only with German light tanks and armored personnel carriers. Early models of the Panzer III and Panzer IV could also be knocked out at close range, but this put Soviet artillerymen in greater danger. Due to these circumstances, model 1937 guns were replaced with an all-new design, the more powerful model 1942. The mass production of outdated model 1937 guns was stopped in 1943. The total number of guns produced was 37,354. The German designation for captured M1937 guns was the 4.5 cm Pak 184/1(r).

Two such guns were employed as an anti-tank platoon, organic to each rifle battalion. Additionally twelve guns were in anti-tank battalions of each rifle division. It was also used by separate anti-tank regiments (4–5 batteries of 4 guns each).

== Ammunition ==
Ammunition types:

- B-240/BR-240 – armor-piercing
- Armor-piercing chemical
- UBR-240P – armor-piercing composite rigid
- UBR-243P – sub-caliber armor-piercing
- UBR-243SP – armor piercing
- UBZR-243 – armor piercing incendiary
- UO-243 – fragmentation
- UssH-243 – shrapnel
- Smoke

== Performance ==
Penetration
Type	100 m (110 yd)	500 m (550 yd)	1,000 m (1,100 yd)	1,500 m (1,600 yd)	2,000 m (2,200 yd)
APHE	61 mm (2.4 in)	46 mm (1.8 in)	32 mm (1.3 in)	22 mm (0.87 in)	15 mm (0.59 in)
APBC-HE	59 mm (2.3 in)	45 mm (1.8 in)	35 mm (1.4 in)	29 mm (1.1 in)	26 mm (1.0 in)
APCR	94 mm (3.7 in)	64 mm (2.5 in)	40 mm (1.6 in)	-	-

== Photo Gallery ==
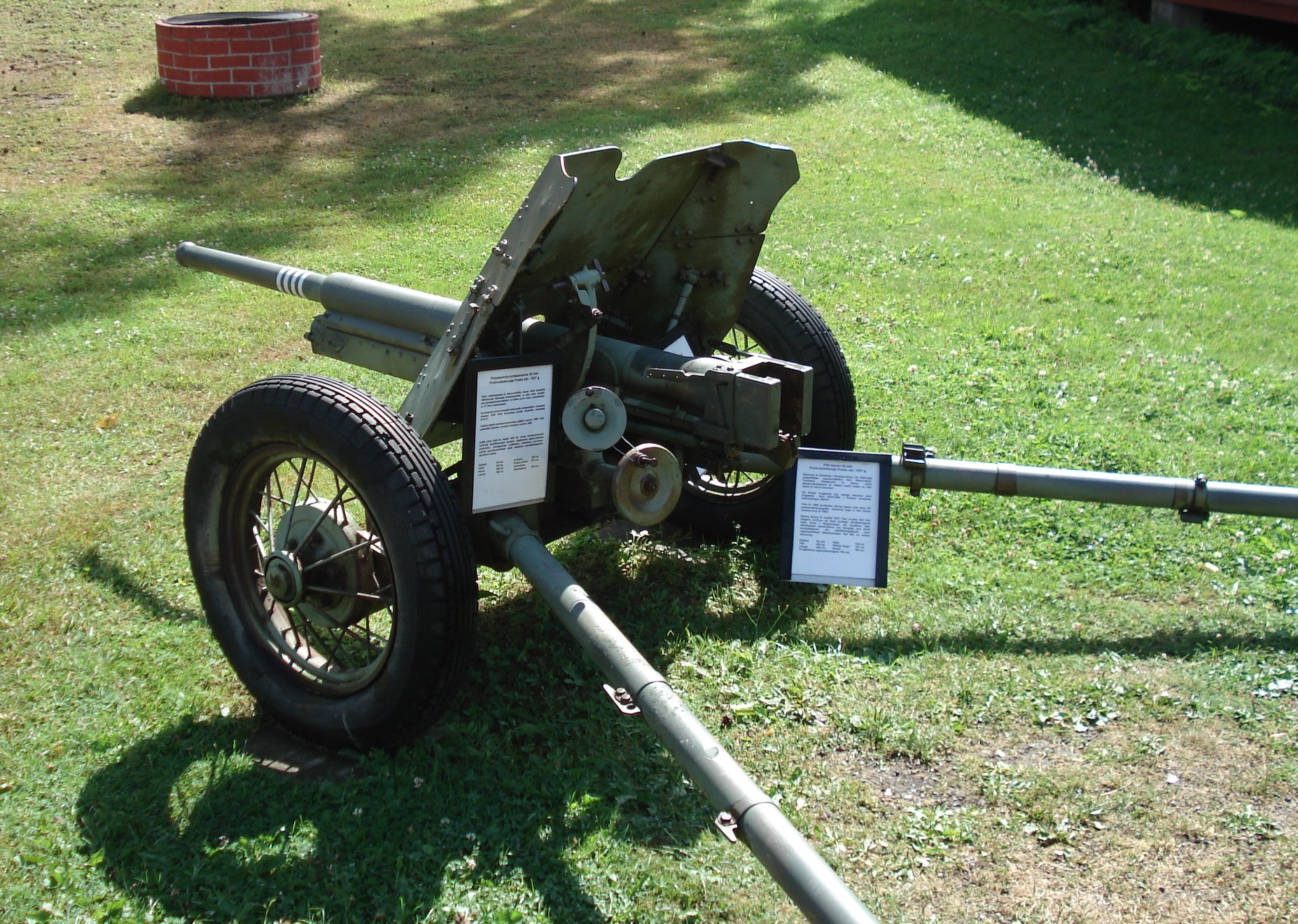

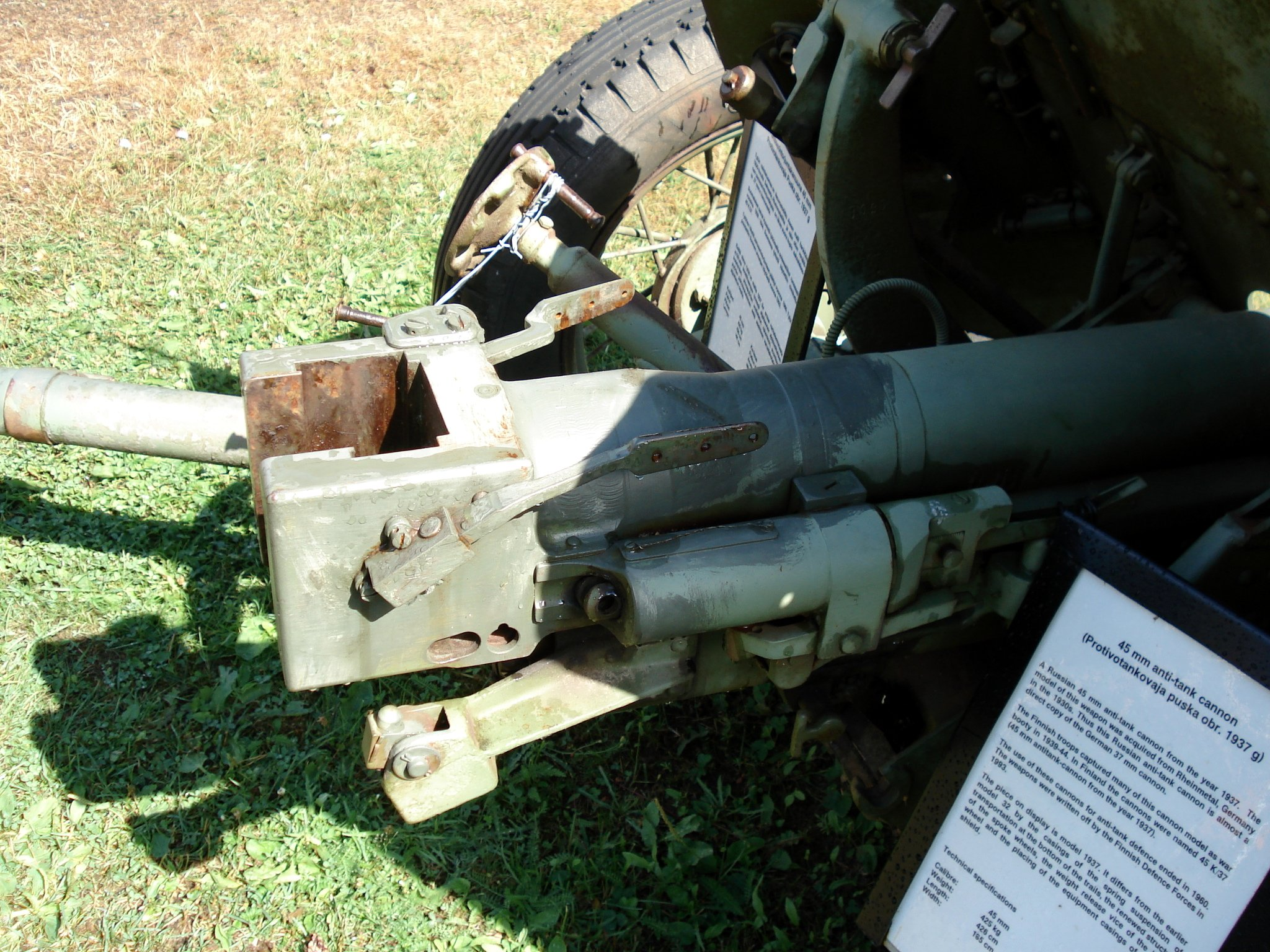

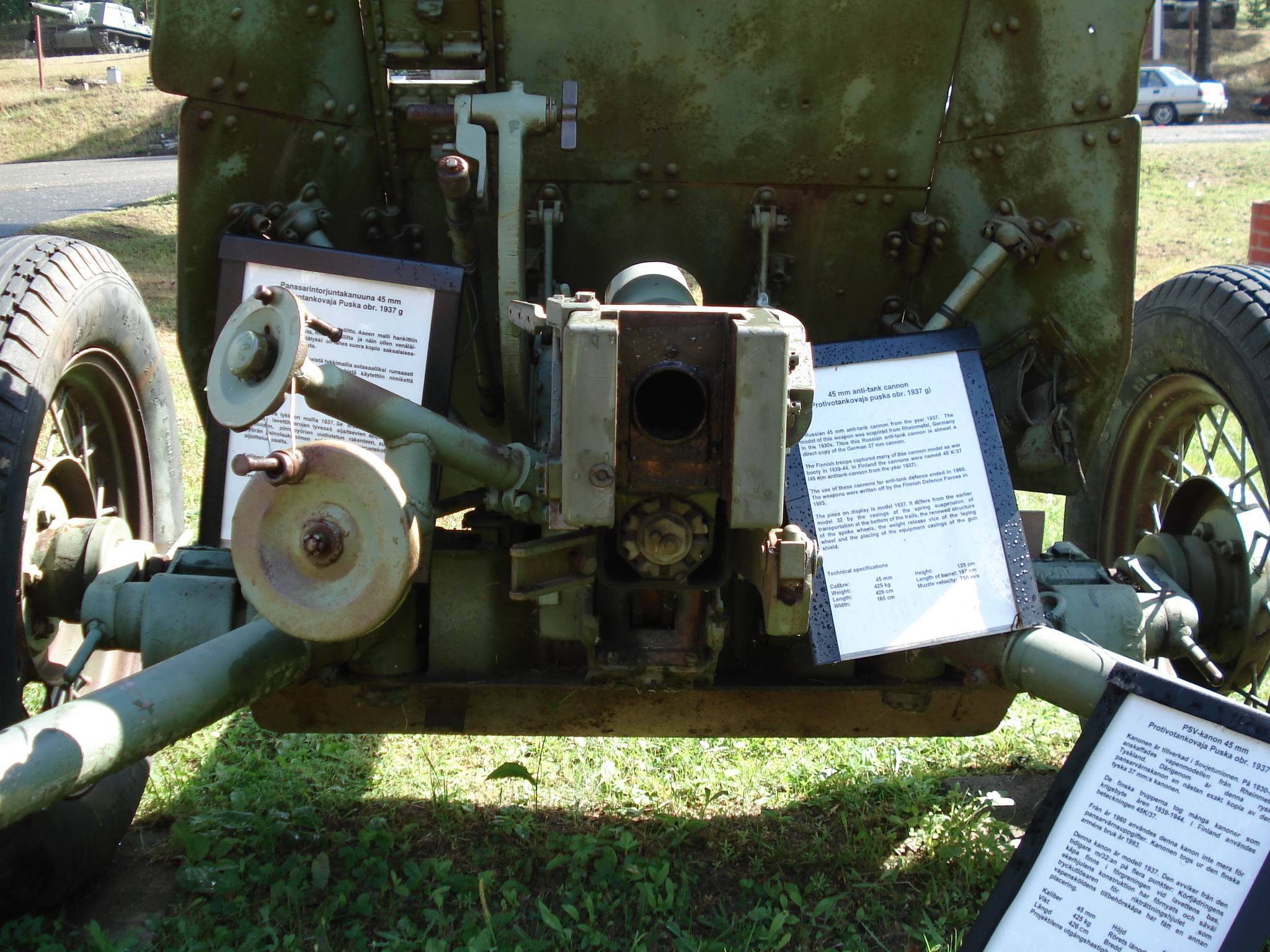

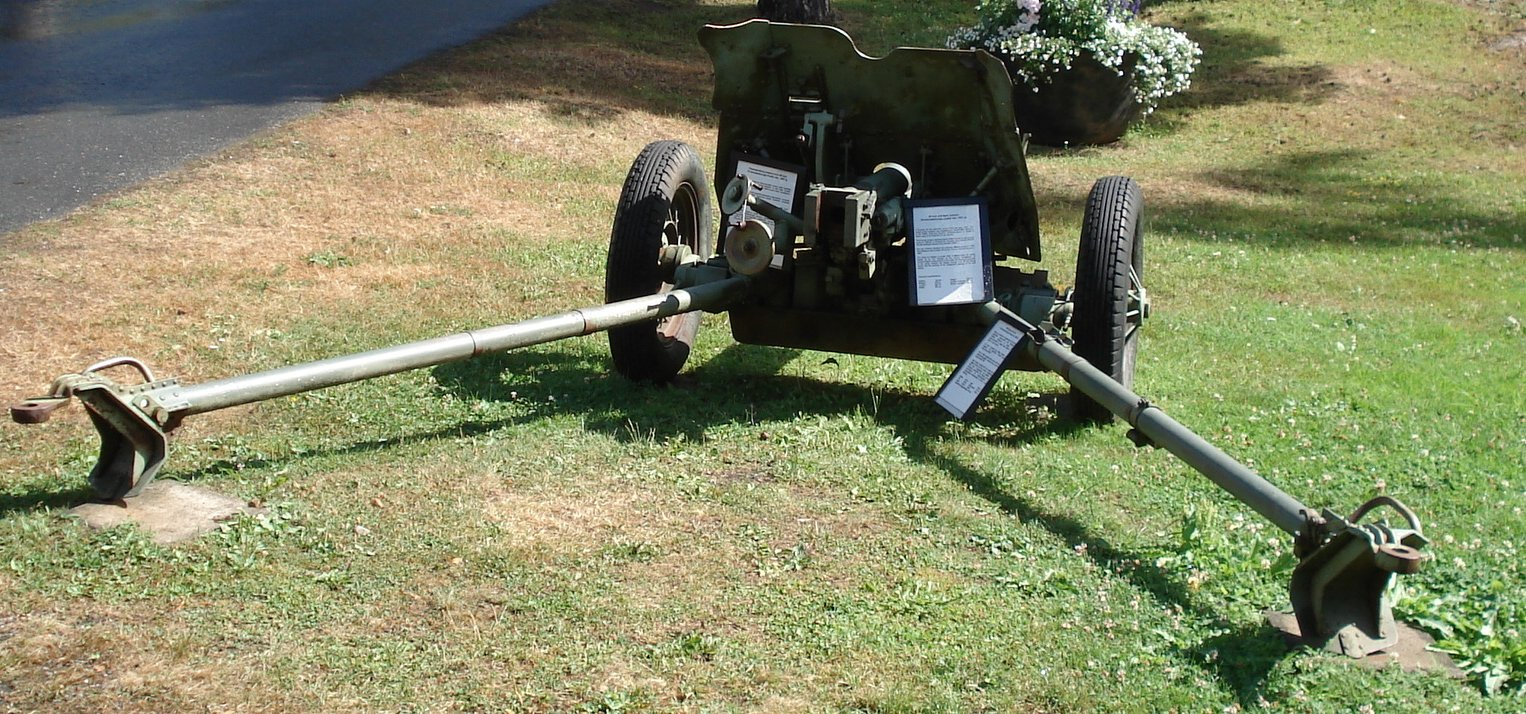
