= Loginovo =

Loginovo (Russian: Логиново) is the name of several rural localities in Russia:

- Loginovo, Mozhaysky District, Moscow Oblast, a village in Mozhaysky District of Moscow Oblast
- Loginovo, Pavlovo-Posadsky District, Moscow Oblast, a village in Pavlovo-Posadsky District of Moscow Oblast
- Loginovo, Solnechnogorsky District, Moscow Oblast, a village in Solnechnogorsky District of Moscow Oblast
- Loginovo, Pskov Oblast, a village in Pskov Oblast
- Loginovo, name of several other rural localities
