= A-IX-2 =

Russian explosive

A-IX-2 (or hexal) is a Russian explosive used in modern Russian military shells. It consists of 73% RDX with 23% aluminium powder, phlegmatized with 4% wax. Its relative effectiveness factor is 1.54.

It has been in use by the Red Army since WWII.
