= Arsenal Machine-Building Plant =

Coordinates: 59°57′22″N 30°22′16″E

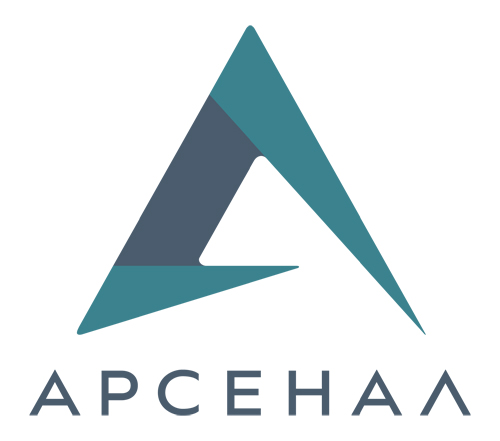

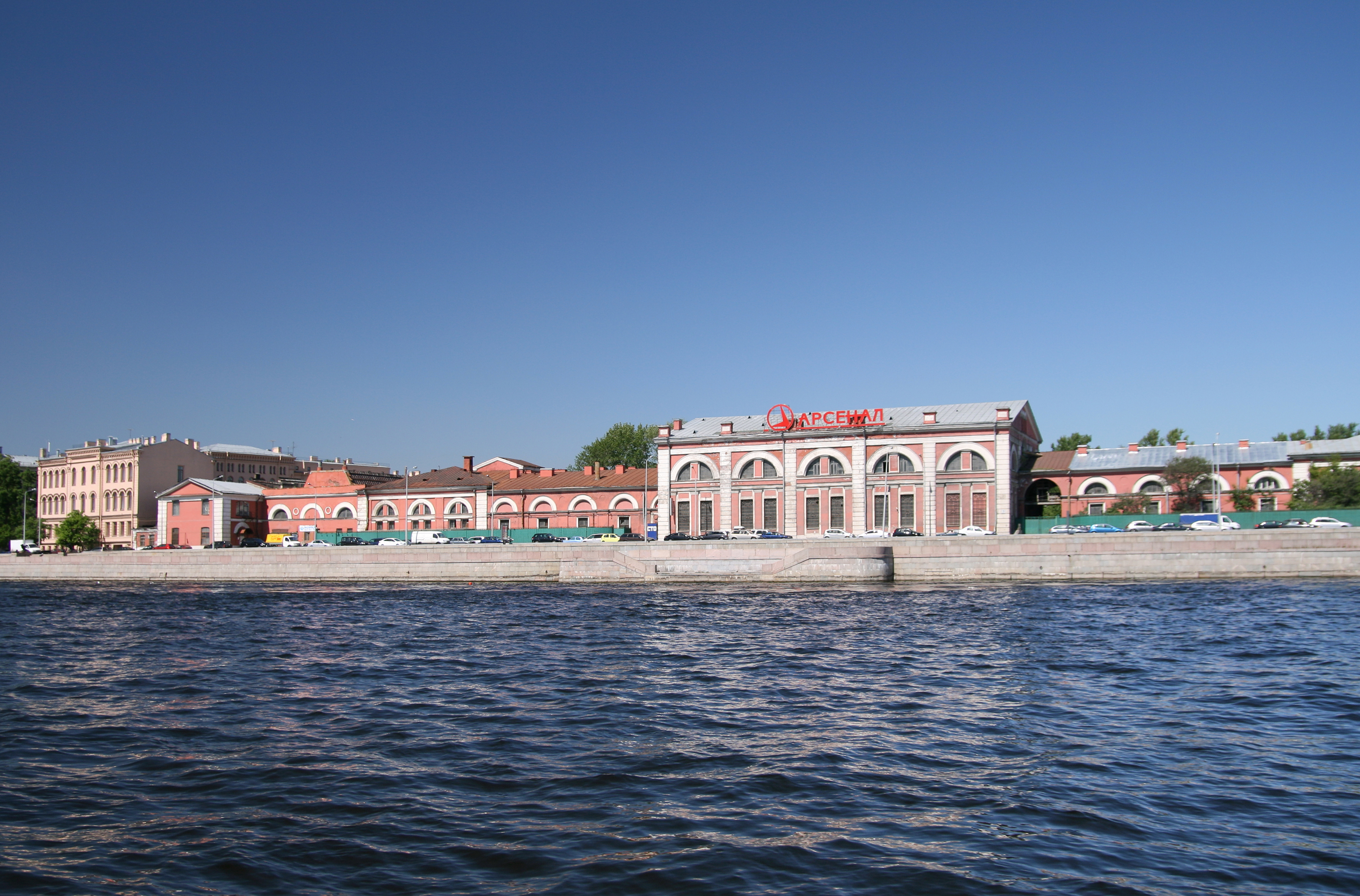
- Type: Open joint-stock company
- Founded: 1711
- Headquarters: Saint Petersburg, Russia
- Website: www.mzarsenal.spb.ru

Arsenal Machine-Building Plant (Russian: Машиностроительный завод «Арсенал») is a company based in Saint Petersburg, Russia.

Historically, a major producer of artillery, the Arsenal Production Association also produces a variety of complex mechanical equipment, such as compressor stations, refrigeration and gas equipment, extrusion machines, and satellite platforms. It is collocated with the Arsenal Design Bureau. It is composed of 5 separate administrative entities: two civilian production operations, a military production operation, a technical support facility, and a commercial center.

== Products ==
- 100 mm field gun M1944 (BS-3)
- AK-100 (naval gun)
- AK-130
- AK-257
- R-31 (missile)
- RT-2
- SS-14 Scapegoat
