= Mikhail Loginov =

Mikhail Nikolayevich Loginov (Russian: Михаил Николаевич Логинов; 21 November 1903 in village of Ivanishinskiye Gorky (now in Staritsky District, Tver Oblast) – 28 October 1940 in Miskhor, Crimean ASSR) was a prominent Soviet designer of anti-tank, air-defense, and other types of artillery, widely used during World War II.

Being a chief designer of the design bureau of 8th Kalinin Artillery plant in Kaliningrad (Moscow Oblast), he created, among others, 45-mm anti-tank gun M1937 (53-K), 76-mm air-defense gun M1938, 37-mm air-defense gun M1939 (61-K), 85-mm air-defense gun M1939 (52-K), 25 mm automatic air defense gun M1940 (72-K).

Loginov died in 1940 of tuberculosis. For his achievements he was rewarded with Order of the Red Star (1937), Order of Lenin (1939), and Stalin Prize (1941, after his death). He was initially buried in Livadiya, Crimea, but his ashes were exhumed and reburied with military honours in the Federal Military Memorial Cemetery in Moscow Oblast on 3 September 2020.
