= Vladimir Loginov (ice hockey) =

Russian ice hockey player

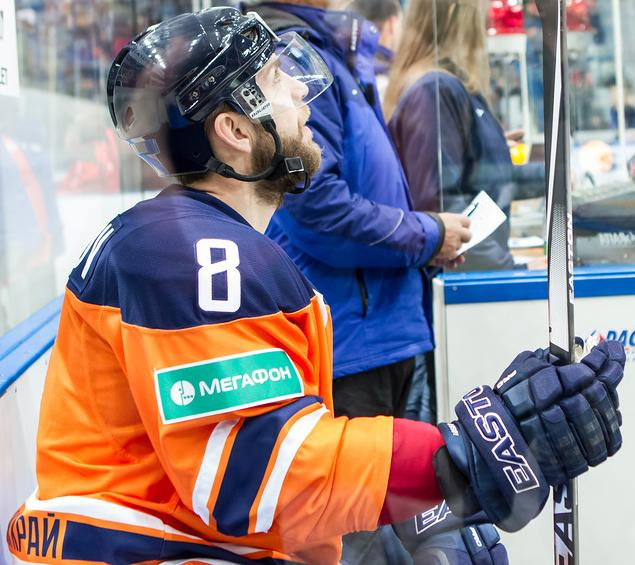
- Born: January 1, 1981 (age 44); Odintsovo, USSR
- Height: 6 ft 0 in (183 cm)
- Weight: 190 lb (86 kg; 13 st 8 lb)
- Position: Defence
- Shoots: Left
- ALIH team Former teams: PSK Sakhalin; Krylya Sovetov Moscow; Salavat Yulaev Ufa; HC Dynamo Moscow; HC Sibir Novosibirsk; HC Spartak Moscow; Yugra Khanty-Mansiysk; Metallurg Novokuznetsk; Amur Khabarovsk
- NHL draft: Undrafted
- Playing career: 1999–present

Vladimir Vyacheslavovich Loginov (Russian: Владимир Вячеславович Логинов; born January 1, 1981) is a Russian professional ice hockey defenceman for PSK Sakhalin of Asia League Ice Hockey (ALIH).

Loginov previously played in the Russian Superleague and Kontinental Hockey League with Krylya Sovetov Moscow, Salavat Yulaev Ufa, HC Dynamo Moscow, HC Sibir NovosibirskYugra Khanty-Mansiysk, Metallurg Novokuznetsk and Amur Khabarovsk.
