= 25 mm automatic air defense gun M1940 (72-K) =

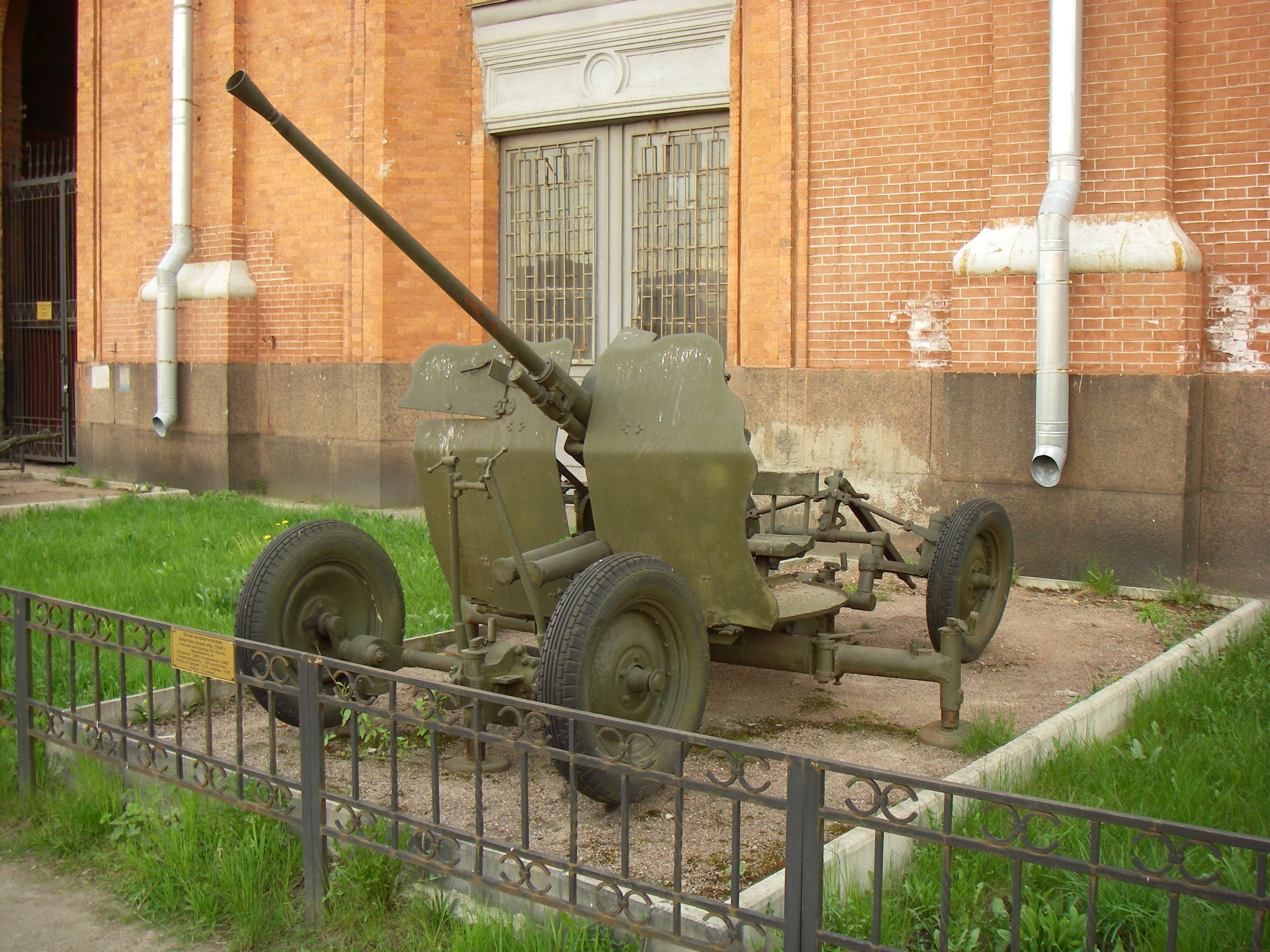
- 72-K at the Saint Petersburg Artillery Museum.
- Type: Anti-aircraft autocannon

Service history
- In service: 1941–1970s

Production history
- Designer: Kalinin plant #8
- Designed: 1939–1940
- Manufacturer: Plant #88
- Produced: 1941–1945
- No. built: 4,600

Specifications
- Mass: 1,210 kilograms (2,670 lb)
- Length: 5.3 metres (17 ft)
- Width: 1.7 metres (5 ft 7 in)
- Height: 1.8 metres (5 ft 11 in)
- Crew: 6
- Shell: 25×218mmSR
- Caliber: 25 millimetres (0.98 in)
- Rate of fire: 240 rpm
- Muzzle velocity: 910 m/s (3,000 ft/s)
- Maximum firing range: 2.4 kilometres (1.5 mi)
- Feed system: 7-round clips

The 25 mm automatic anti-aircraft gun model 1940, plant code 72-K, was a Soviet autocannon that entered service with the Red Army in 1941. The weapon's mobility and rate of fire were unsatisfactory and production stopped at the end of the Second World War.

== Description ==
The 72-K is either based on the Bofors 25 mm M/32 or the 37 mm gun M1939 (61-K).

The gun weighs approximately 445 kilograms (981 lb), is about 2 metres (6 ft 7 in) long. It uses a long-recoil mechanism which adds weight and limits the rate of fire. The gun can fire 240 rounds per minute.

The gun fires 25×218mmSR ammunition. The 25×218mmSR M1940 cartridges were made in high-explosive incendiary and armour-piercing types; the shape was slightly different than the Bofors m/32 cartridge. M1940 ammunition was fed in 7-round charger clips.

== Development ==
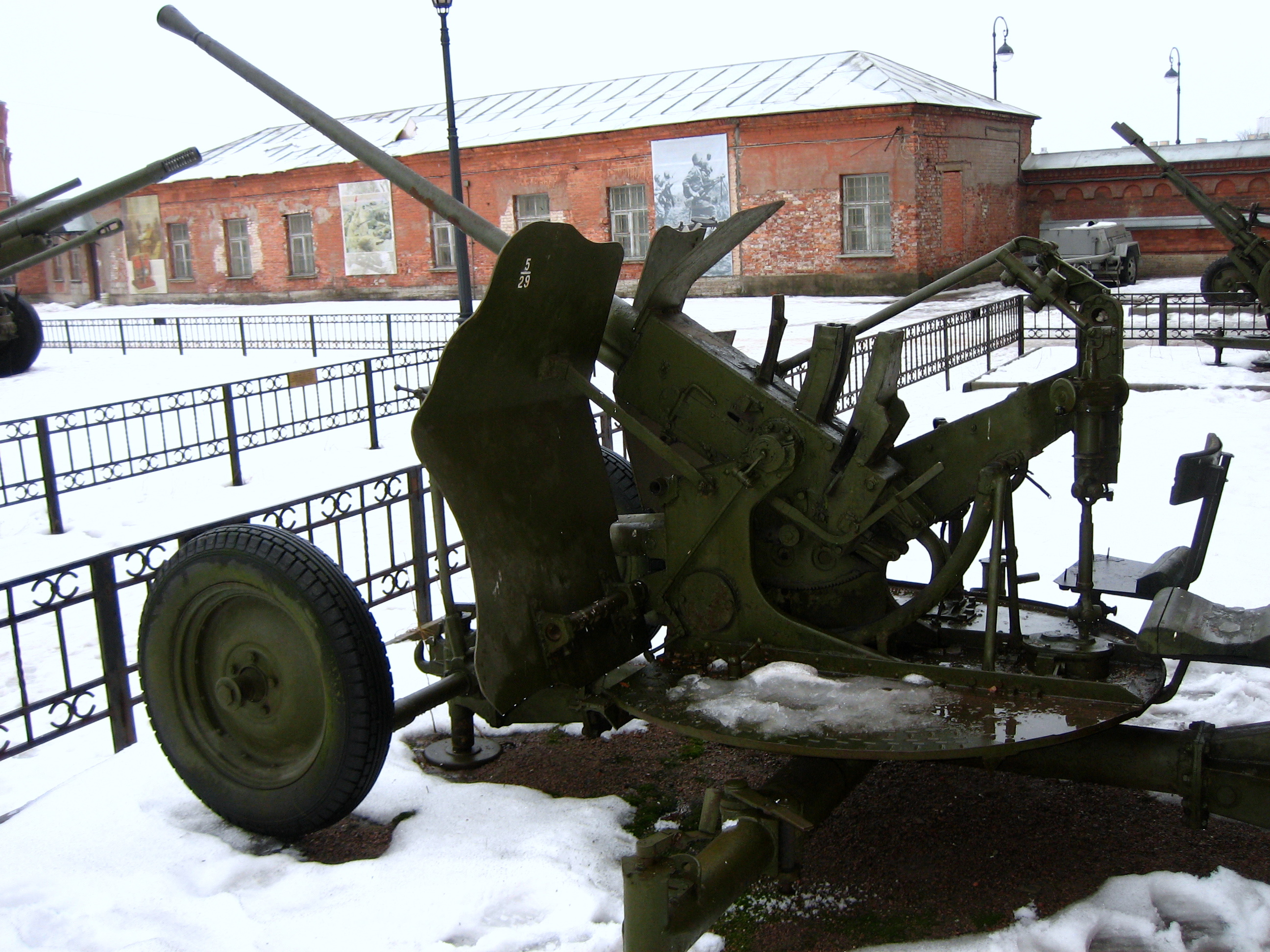
Left side of the 72-K.

The 72-K was intended to be a lighter and more mobile alternative to the 61-K; which was mounted on a bulky four-wheeled carriage. The prototype, designated ZIK-25, was designed by L.A. Yavlyalas at Kalinin Plant #8, and then given the plant designation 72-K. The gun was mounted on a four-wheel carriage and tested at an anti-aircraft range in April and May 1940. According to the test results, the 72-K had "no essential advantages" over the 61-K, mobility was less than expected because of the large carriage, and the ammunition needed to be redesigned for accuracy. The gun was adopted in 1940.

The first guns were produced in 1941 at Plant #172 in Perm; the intended carriages were not available so they were mounted on trucks which gave them the intended mobility. Production expanded to Plant #4 in Krasnoyarsk in 1942, and Plant #88 in 1943. By this time, the intended carriages were in use and augmented with gun shields.

Production likely ended in 1945 due to the lack of mobility and firepower compared to the 61-K.

== Operational history ==
The 72-K was withdrawn from Soviet service after the Second World War. They were sold to the Socialist Federal Republic of Yugoslavia where they remained in use until the mid-1970s.

== Mountings and variants ==
72-K
Original gun and entered service as the 25 mm automatic anti-aircraft gun model 1940. Single-gun mounting on a four-wheel carriage weighing 1,210 kilograms (2,670 lb) with a gun shield, crew of six, and can engage targets moving up to 200 m/s (660 ft/s) at a maximuum slant range of 2.4 kilometres (1.5 mi). Around 4600 guns produced. Production ended in 1945.
84-K
Naval mounting for the 72-K. Developed by Kalinin Plant #8 starting in 1940, and passed testing and accepted in 1941. Wartime evacuations delayed entry into production until December 1943 at Plant #88. Improved 84-KM introduced in 1944; 330 produced. Production ended in 1945.
94-K
Twin 72-K mounting. Designed by Plant #88 the end of 1943, design corrected to 94-KM after tests in 1944, and entered service as 25 mm anti-aircraft gun model 1944. The four-wheel carriage weighs 2,150 kilograms (4,740 lb) and has a crew of nine. Some were mounted on ZIS-11 trucks. Plant #88 produced 237 guns. Production ended in 1945.
Z-1
Twin naval 84-K mounting for submarines designed by Plant #88. Passed range tests in 1944 and cancelled at the end of the Second World War.
Z-5
Proposed quadruple mounting by Plant #88.

== Sources ==
- Koll, Christian (2009). Soviet Cannon: A Comprehensive Study of Soviet Guns and Ammunition in Calibres 12.7 mm to 57 mm. Austria: Koll. ISBN 978-3-200-01445-9.
- Williams, Anthony G. (2000). Rapid Fire: The Development of Automatic Cannon, Heavy Machine Guns and Their Ammunition for Armies, Navies and Air Forces. England: Airlife. ISBN 978-1840371222.
