= HSwMS Sverige =

Swedish WWI & WWII-era coastal defence ship

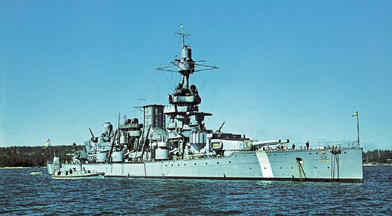
- Sverige

History

Sweden
- Name: Sverige
- Namesake: Sweden
- Builder: Götaverken, Gothenburg
- Laid down: 12 December 1912
- Launched: 3 May 1915
- Commissioned: 14 May 1917
- Decommissioned: 30 January 1953
- Fate: Scrapped, 1958

General characteristics
- Class & type: Sverige-class coastal defence ship
- Displacement: 6,852 long tons (6,962 t) (standard)
- Length: 119.72 m (392 ft 9 in) (o/a)
- Beam: 18.63 m (61 ft 1 in)
- Draught: 6.25 m (20 ft 6 in) (deep load)
- Installed power: 12 × Yarrow boilers; 20,000 shp (15,000 kW)
- Propulsion: 4 × shafts; 4 × steam turbines
- Speed: 22.5 knots (41.7 km/h; 25.9 mph)
- Range: 2,720 nmi (5,040 km; 3,130 mi) at 14 knots (26 km/h; 16 mph)
- Complement: 443
- Armament: As built: 2 × twin 283 mm (11.1 in) guns; 1 × twin, 6 × single 152 mm (6 in) guns; 4 × single 75 mm (3 in) guns; 2 × single 75 mm AA guns; 2 × 45 cm (17.7 in) torpedo tubes; During WWII: 2 × twin 283 mm guns; 1 × twin; 4 × single 152 mm guns; 2 × twin 75 mm AA guns; 3 × twin 40 mm (1.6 in) AA guns; 2 × twin 25 mm (1 in) AA guns; 3 × single 20 mm (0.8 in) AA guns
- Armour: Waterline belt: 200 mm (7.9 in); Deck: 18–28 mm (0.7–1.1 in); Main-gun turrets: 200 mm (7.9 in); Citadel: 100 mm (3.9 in)

HSwMS Sverige was a Sverige-class coastal defence ship (Pansarskepp) commissioned by Sweden during the last year of the First World War. The ship cost approximately 12 million kronor, a sum raised entirely by public donations. The fundraising was done because of the Karl Staaff government's reluctance to spend money on a new battleship. In addition to its impressive cost, the ship also had a significant impact on the Swedish Navy and its capabilities.

== Background and description ==
Sweden was not immune from the naval arms race in the early 20th century. After dissolving the union with Norway in 1905, the situation was tense with the Russian Empire in the east, Germany south of the Baltic Sea, and Norway, traditionally being an Anglophile country, to the west. In 1911, battle-ready units from the Royal Navy and the Imperial German Navy cruised around in the North Sea. Due to the perilous atmosphere brought about by these tensions, and as the latest Swedish coastal battleship Oscar II was a typical pre-dreadnought ship (with two 8-inch (210 mm) guns and a maximum speed of 17.8 knots (33.0 km/h; 20.5 mph)), the need for a new class of ships was pressing. Seaworthiness, armament, armour and speed, all had to be improved according to the multiple new technologies that had arrived with the naval arms race that followed the launch of the British HMS Dreadnought. In 1911, the parliament voted (with a small majority) funds for the building of the new vessel, varying in size from 4,800 to 7,500 metric tons (4,700 to 7,400 long tons) and with armaments and speed in various arrangements accordingly). The postponement of funding for HSwMS Sverige by Prime Minister Karl Staaff had a significant impact on the "Pansarbåtinsamlingen" fundraising campaign. The campaign, which had aimed to raise 12 million kronor for the ship, was put on hold as a result of the political uncertainty. Despite this, the fundraising campaign for Sverige was successful, in large part due to the support of King Gustav V. The campaign raised a total of 15 million kronor in just over three months, an impressive achievement. The new government accepted the money and signed the contract for the ship, which was named Sverige to thank the people who had paid for it.

After the outbreak of World War I, two more ships were ordered which had a slightly changed appearance, the two bearing the names of the King and Queen of Sweden.

Note that while the ship is listed as a battleship in Jane's Fighting Ships, 1938 edition, technically it is a coastal defence ship, a class which was commonly used in Nordic countries. The navies of Finland, Norway, and Denmark made use of similar ships. However, the Swedish Navy used the Sverige-class armored warships as the core of battle groups in the same manner as other navies used battleships.

Sverige had an overall length of 119.72 metres (392 ft 9 in), a beam of 18.63 metres (61 ft 1 in) and a maximum draught of 6.25 metres (20 ft 6 in). The ship displaced 6,852 long tons (6,962 t) at standard load and 7,516 long tons (7,637 t) at deep load. A dozen Yarrow boilers provided steam at a pressure of 18 kg/cm^{2} (1,765 kPa; 256 psi) to four Curtis direct-drive geared steam turbines that each drove a single propeller shaft. Fuel oil could be sprayed onto the coal in the boilers to maximize steam pressure. The engines were rated at a total of 20,000 shaft horsepower (15,000 kW) that was designed to give her a speed of 22.5 knots (41.7 km/h; 25.9 mph). Sverige carried up to 665 long tons (676 t) of coal and 100 long tons (102 t) of fuel oil that gave her a range of 2,720 nautical miles (5,040 km; 3,130 mi) at a speed of 14 knots (26 km/h; 16 mph). The ship had a complement of 443 officers and ratings when serving as a flagship.

=== Armament, fire control and protection ===
The ship's main battery consisted of four Bofors 283-millimetre (11 in) m/12 guns. These were mounted in two twin-gun turrets, one each forward and aft of the superstructure. Her secondary armament consisted of eight 152-millimetre (6 in) m/12 guns. One pair was positioned in a twin-gun turret superfiring over the forward 283 mm gun turret; the other were arranged in single-gun turrets, three on each broadside amidships. Defence against torpedo boats was provided by four 75-millimetre (3 in) m/12 guns in single mounts in the superstructure. The ship was fitted with two single mounts for Bofors 75 mm m/15 anti-aircraft (AA) guns. She was also equipped with a pair of submerged 45-centimetre (17.7 in) torpedo tubes, one on each broadside. Targeting data for the guns was collected by 3-metre (9 ft 10 in) rangefinders in the conning tower and in the main-gun turrets. The ranges were sent to a pair of range clocks that calculated the elevation and traverse positions for the guns.

The Sverige-class ships had a waterline armour belt 200 millimetres (7.9 in) thick. Their deck armour ranged in thickness from 18 millimetres (0.7 in) on the flat to 28 millimetres (1.1 in) on the slope where it connected to the base of the armour belt. The armour protecting the conning tower had a maximum thickness of 175 millimetres (7 in) while that of the armoured citadel was 100 millimetres (3.9 in) thick. The main-gun turrets also had a maximum thickness of 200 millimetres of armour, but the secondary-gun turrets only had 125 millimetres (4.9 in) of armour. Underwater protection was limited to a single anti-torpedo bulkhead on each broadside and subdividing the hull below the deck into thirteen watertight compartments. The ships were also fitted with a double bottom.

=== Modifications ===
Sometime during the early 1920s, the 75-millimetre AA guns were modified with new sights and mounts and were redesignated as m/15-23 guns. During Sverige's 1931–1933 refit, a 4-metre (13 ft 1 in) rangefinder with a Dutch Hazemeyer fire-control system was installed on the aft superstructure and the existing AA guns were replaced by twin mounts for 75 mm Bofors m/28 guns. At the same time a pair of Bofors 25-millimetre (1 in) m/32 AA guns on single mounts was added on the roofs of the forward single 152 mm gun turrets.

The ship's 1938–1940 refit saw the replacement of her mixed-firing Yarrow boilers, and their coal bunkers, with four oil-burning Penhoët boilers.

== Captains ==
- 1917–1918: Fredrik Riben
- 1926–1927: Gunnar Bjurner
- 1940–1940: Alarik Wachtmeister
- 1940–1941: Erik Anderberg
- 1945–1946: Henning Hammargren

== Bibliography ==
- Friedman, Norman (2011). Naval Weapons of World War One: Guns, Torpedoes, Mines and ASW Weapons of All Nations; An Illustrated Directory. Barnsley, UK: Seaforth Publishing. ISBN 978-1-84832-100-7.
- Harris, Daniel G. (1992). "The Sverige Class Coastal Defense Ships". In Gardiner, Robert (ed.). Warship 1992. London: Naval Institute Press. pp. 80–98. ISBN 0-85177-603-5.
- Sundberg, Ulf (2018). "The Armoured Ship Sverige (1915)". In Taylor, Bruce (ed.). The World of the Battleship: The Lives and Careers of Twenty-One Capital Ships of the World's Navies, 1880–1990. Barnsley: Seaforth Publishing. pp. 290–307. ISBN 978-0-87021-906-1.
- Westerlund, Karl-Eric (1985). "Sweden". In Gray, Randal (ed.). Conway's All the World's Fighting Ships 1906–1921. London: Conway Maritime Press. pp. 355–363. ISBN 978-0-85177-245-5.
