= Bofors 15.2 cm M/12 naval gun =

15.2 cm marinkanon M/12
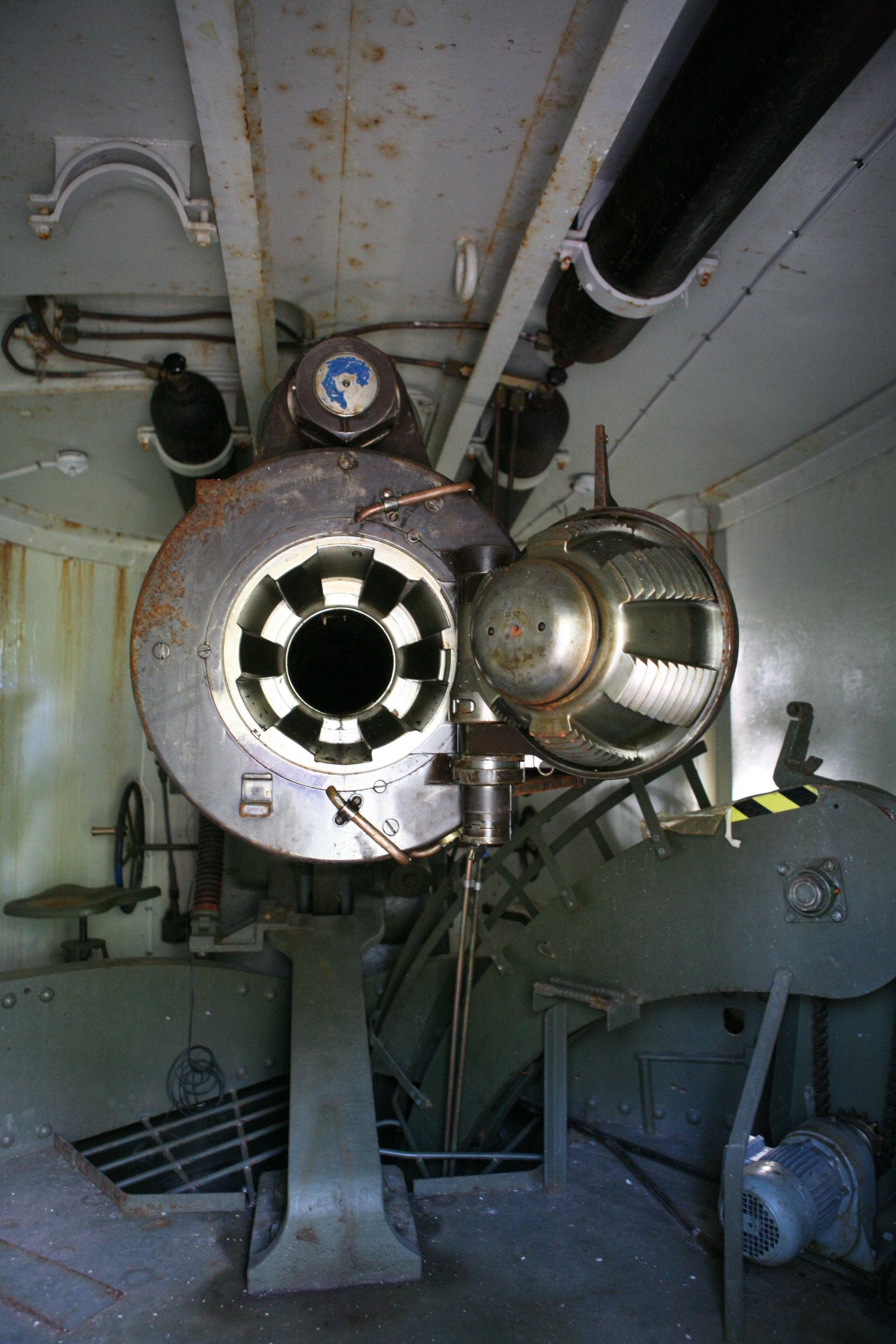
- Interior of a single-gun M/12 turret, showing the open breech and the interrupted screw
- Type: Naval artillery
- Place of origin: Sweden

Service history
- In service: 1916–1957

Production history
- Designer: Bofors
- Designed: 1912
- Manufacturer: Bofors

Specifications
- Mass: 7.75 t (7.63 long tons; 8.54 short tons)
- Barrel length: 762 cm (25 ft) (50 caliber)
- Shell: 45.4 kg (100 lb)
- Caliber: 15.2 cm (6.0 in)
- Breech: Interrupted screw
- Elevation: -5°/+30°
- Rate of fire: 3–4 rpm
- Muzzle velocity: 850 m/s (2,800 ft/s)
- Maximum firing range: 16,000 m (17,000 yd) (19,000m post 1930's)

The Bofors 15.2 cm M/12 naval gun was a weapon used as the secondary armament of the Swedish Sverige-class coastal defence ships. It was designed and built by Bofors a few years before the First World War.

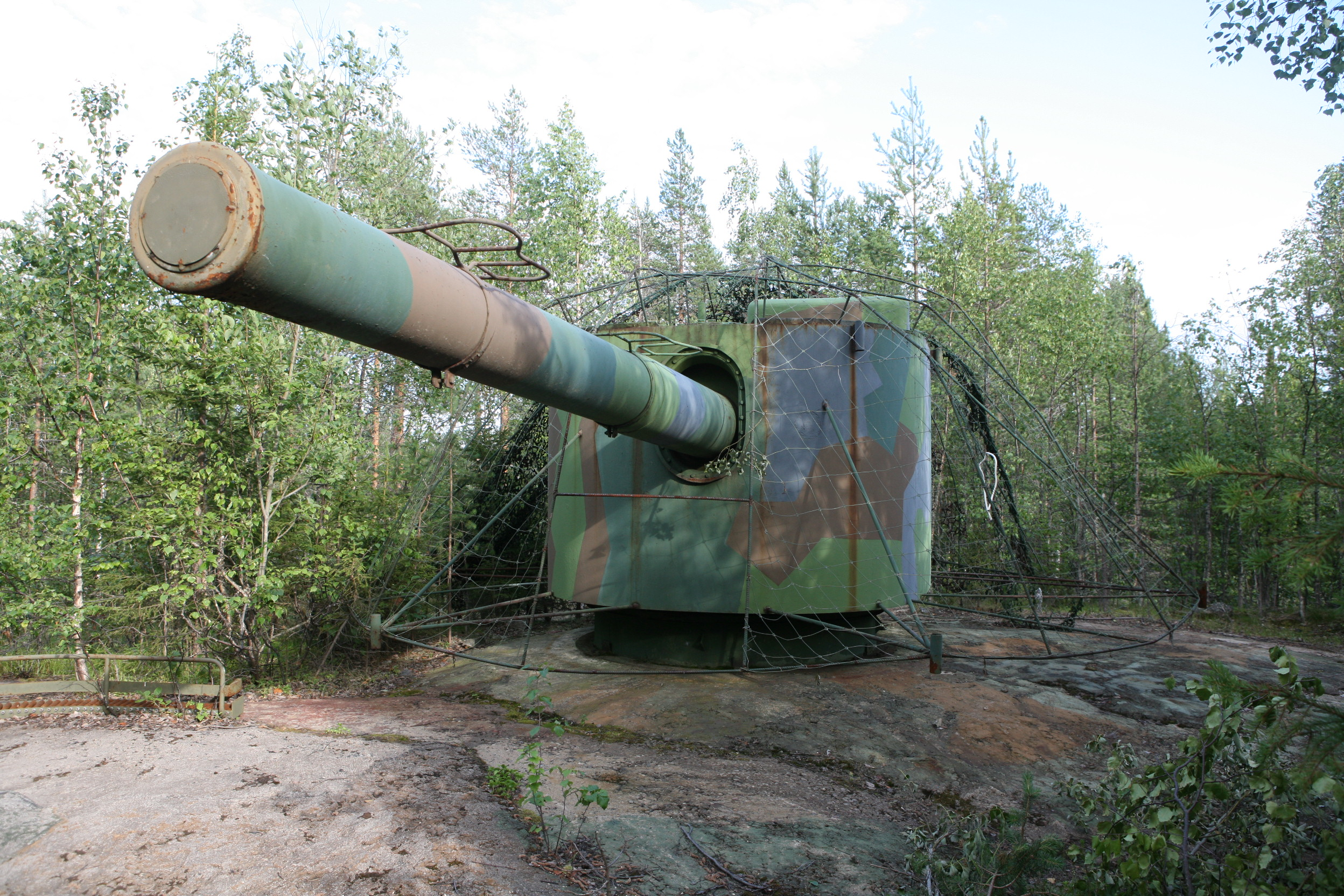
A single-gun turret dismounted from Gustav V after she was scrapped in 1970

== Bibliography ==
- Ahlberg, Lars (1986). "Gun Data for the Swedish Svierge Class Coastal Battleships". F.P.D.S. Newsletter. XIV (3): 1.
- Campbell, John (1985). Naval Weapons of World War II. Annapolis, Maryland: Naval Institute Press. ISBN 0-87021-459-4.
- Friedman, Norman (2011). Naval Weapons of World War One: Guns, Torpedoes, Mines and ASW Weapons of All Nations; An Illustrated Directory. Barnsley, UK: Seaforth Publishing. ISBN 978-1-84832-100-7.
- Harris, Daniel G. (1992). "The Svierge Class Coastal Defense Ships". In Gardiner, Robert (ed.). Warship 1992. London: Naval Institute Press. pp. 80–98. ISBN 0-85177-603-5.
