= Johan Eberhard Geijer =

Swedish ironmaster (1733–1796)

Johan Eberhard Geijer (Swedish: [ˈjɛ̌jɛr]; 19 October 1733 – 21 December 1796) was a Swedish ironmaster.

Born in Uddeholm in Värmland, Sweden on October 19, 1733, to Bengt Gustaf Geijer and Lovisa Sophia Tranæa, Geijer married Anna Fredrika Löfman and had children. He served as "huvudmasmästare" in Värmland from 1760 to 1763 and owned the Bofors Works from 1762 to 1770 when his brother, Emanuel af Geijerstam, acquired it. Geijer later acquired the Lindfors Works.
