= Storängstorp =

Historical building in Karlskoga, Sweden

- Interactive map of the Storängstorp area

General information
- Location: Karlskoga, Sweden
- Construction started: 18th century

Storängstorp (Swedish pronunciation: [stuːrˈɛŋsˈtɔrp], 'Large Meadow Torp') is a historical estate in Karlskoga Municipality, Örebro County, Sweden. The building is located south of Karlskoga.

Lieutenant Anton af Geijerstam, born in 1758 to Emanuel af Geijerstam, resided at the estate in 1799, where he died in 1820. After his death, the estate was inherited by his widow, Christina Charlotta af Geijerstam (née Sundell), who held ownership until 1820. Subsequently, the estate was first acquired by Nils Olofsson and then by lay judge Peter Persson.

By 1883, the estate had been designated as a kronolänsmansboställe.

In November 2022, it was announced that the area northwest of the property has been identified as a potential site for residential development.

== See also ==
- Geijer family
