= HSwMS Drottning Victoria =

Swedish ship

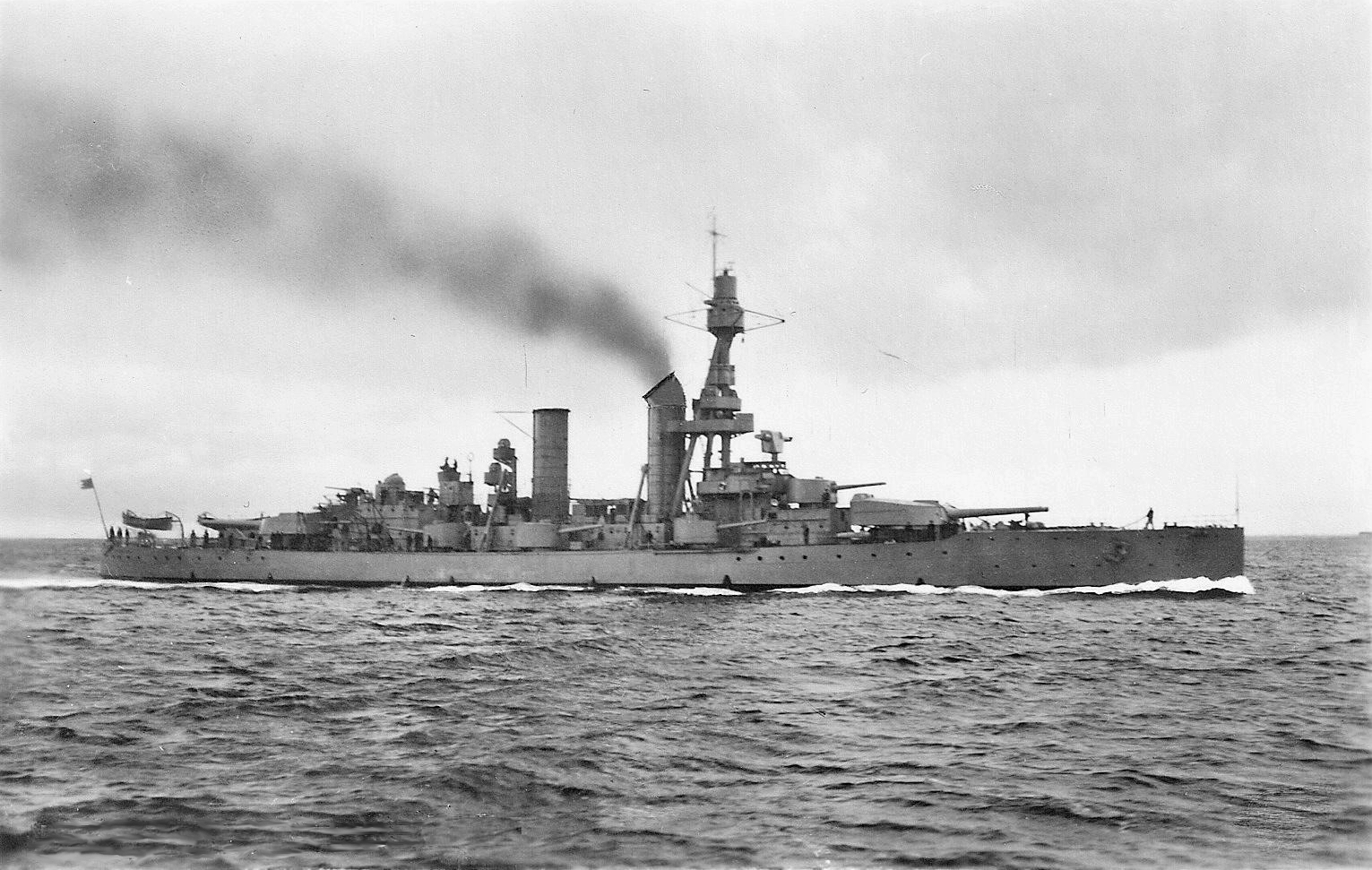
- HSwMS Drottning Victoria under way

History

Sweden
- Name: HSwMS Drottning Victoria
- Namesake: Victoria of Baden
- Builder: Götaverken, Gothenburg
- Laid down: July 1915
- Launched: 15 September 1917
- Commissioned: 12 March 1921
- Decommissioned: 22 March 1957
- Fate: Scrapped 1959

General characteristics
- Class & type: Sverige-class coastal defence ship
- Displacement: 6,842 t standard; 7,663 t full load
- Length: 120.9 m (396 ft 8 in) waterline; 121.6 m (398 ft 11 in) overall
- Beam: 18.63 m (61 ft 1 in)
- Draught: 6.25 m (20 ft 6 in)
- Propulsion: 12 Yarrow boilers; 2 Motala-Westinghouse geared turbines; 2 three-blade propellers; 22,000 hp (16,000 kW)
- Speed: 23.2 kn (43.0 km/h; 26.7 mph)
- Range: 3,280 nmi (6,070 km; 3,770 mi) at 14 kn (26 km/h; 16 mph)
- Complement: 427
- Armament: 4 × Bofors 283 mm gun M/1912 (2×2); 8 × 152 mm/50 cal. Bofors QF M/1912 (1×2, 6×1); 4 × 75 mm/53 cal. Bofors QF M/1912 (4×1); 2 × 75 mm/53 cal. Bofors AA M/1915 (2×1); 2 × 57 mm/21.3 cal. Bofors M/1916 (2×1); 2 × 6.5 mm/92.3 cal. MG M/1914 (2×1); 2 × 45 cm torpedo tubes M/1914 (2×1); WWII: 4 × Bofors 283 mm gun M/1912 (2×2); 6 × 152 mm/50 cal. Bofors QF M/1912 (1×2, 4×1); 4 × 75 mm/60 cal. Bofors AA M/1928 (2×2); 6 × 40 mm/56 cal. Bofors AA M/1936 (3×2); 4 × 25 mm/58 cal. Bofors AA M/1932 (2×2); 3 × 20 mm/66 cal. Bofors AA M/1940 (3×1); 4 × 8 mm/75.8 cal. AA MG M/1936 (2×2)
- Armour: Belt 200 mm (8 in); Turrets 200 mm (8 in); Citadel 100 mm (4 in); Deck 18–28 mm (1–1 in)

HSwMS Drottning Victoria was a Sverige-class coastal defence ship (Pansarskepp) for the Royal Swedish Navy in the 1910s.

Notable commanders of the ship include Gösta Ehrensvärd between 1932 and 1933, Yngve Ekstrand in 1936 and 1937 and Stig H:son Ericson during 1942 and part of 1943.

Plans were drawn up in the 1940s to modernize Drottning Victoria by rebuilding the superstructure, increasing the elevation of the main turrets to 32 degrees, and replacing the light armament with 2 twin 57mm guns and 12 40mm/56 Bofors guns in 4 twin and 4 single mounts, as well as 10 25mm Bofors mounts. This would have more than doubled the weight of anti-aircraft fire per minute. These plans were never undertaken. The plans and an essay explaining them can be viewed in here on pages 103 to 113.

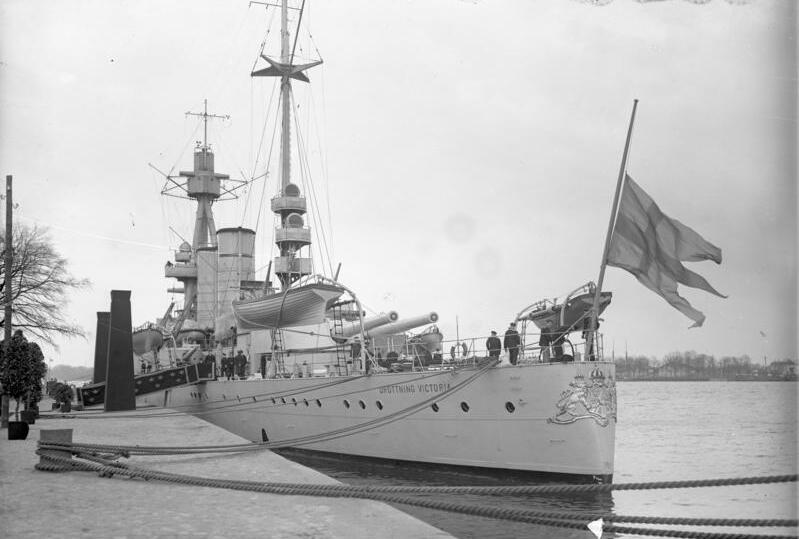

== Bibliography ==
- Harris, Daniel G. (1992). "The Svierge Class Coastal Defense Ships". In Gardiner, Robert (ed.). Warship 1992. London: Naval Institute Press. pp. 80–98. ISBN 0-85177-603-5.
- Sundberg, Ulf (2018). "The Armoured Ship Sverige (1915)". In Taylor, Bruce (ed.). The World of the Battleship: The Lives and Careers of Twenty-One Capital Ships of the World's Navies, 1880–1990. Barnsley: Seaforth Publishing. pp. 290–307. ISBN 978-0-87021-906-1.
- Utredning och Forslag angaende Sjorkrigsmaterielens sammansättning m.m. avgivet jamlikt Kungl. [Investigation and Proposals regarding the composition of the Naval War Equipment, etc.]. Swedish National Archives. pp. 103–113.
- Westerlund, Karl-Eric (1985). "Sweden". In Gray, Randal (ed.). Conway's All the World's Fighting Ships 1906–1921. London: Conway Maritime Press. pp. 355–363. ISBN 978-0-85177-245-5.
