= HSwMS Gustaf V =

Swedish Sverige-class coastal defence ship

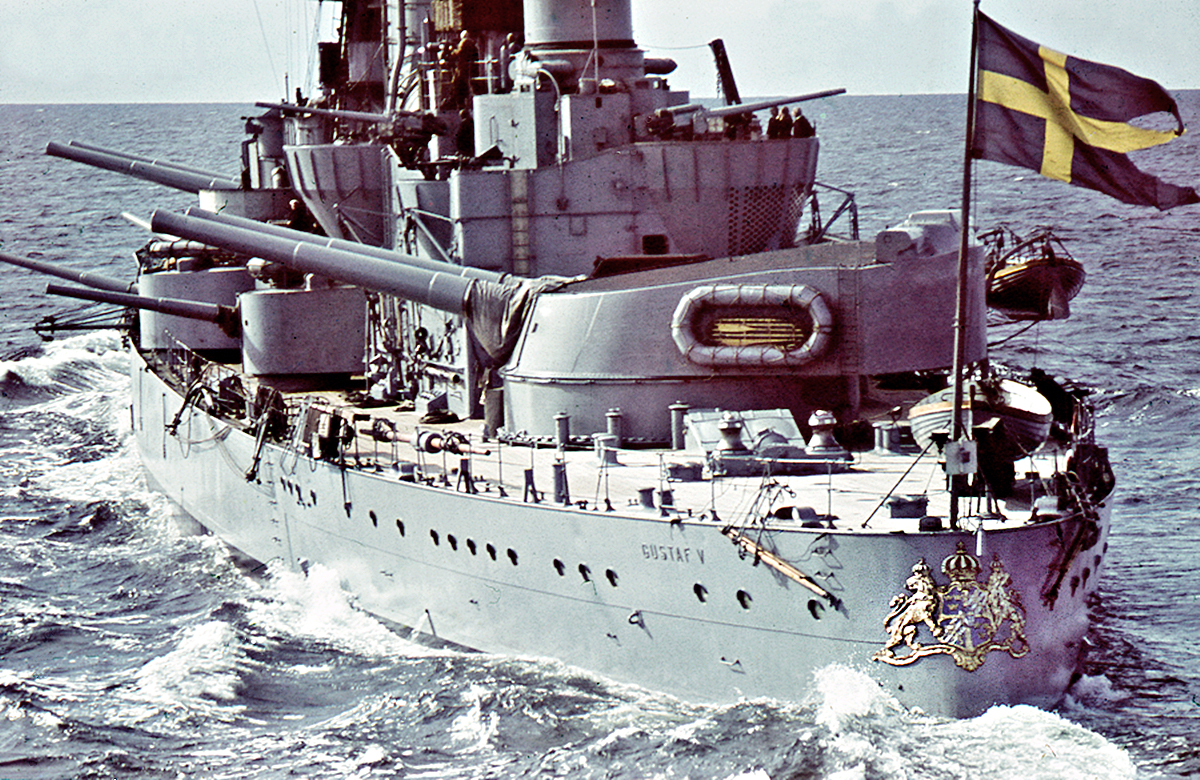
- HSwMS Gustaf V

History

Sweden
- Name: HSwMS Gustaf V
- Namesake: Gustaf V of Sweden
- Builder: Kockums Mekaniska Verkstad, Malmö
- Laid down: Spring 1915
- Launched: 15 September 1917
- Commissioned: 12 December 1922
- Decommissioned: 22 March 1957
- Fate: Scrapped, 1970

General characteristics
- Class & type: Sverige-class coastal defence ship
- Displacement: 6,842 t standard; 7,663 t full load
- Length: 120.9 m (396 ft 8 in) (waterline); 121.6 m (398 ft 11 in) (o/a)
- Beam: 18.63 m (61 ft 1 in)
- Draught: 6.25 m (20 ft 6 in)
- Installed power: 22,000 shp (16,000 kW); 12 Yarrow boilers
- Propulsion: 2 shafts; 2 geared steam turbines;
- Speed: 23.2 knots (43.0 km/h; 26.7 mph)
- Range: 3,280 nmi (6,070 km; 3,770 mi) at 14 knots (26 km/h; 16 mph)
- Crew: 427
- Armament: 4 × Bofors 283 mm gun M/1912 (2×2); 8 × 152 mm/50 cal. Bofors QF M/1912 (1×2, 6×1); 4 × 75 mm/53 cal. Bofors QF M/1912 (4×1); 2 × 75 mm/53 cal. Bofors AA M/1915 (2×1); 2 × 57 mm/21.3 cal. Bofors M/1916 (2×1); 2 × 6.5 mm/92.3 cal. MG M/1914 (2×1); 2 × 45 cm torpedo tubes M/1914 (2×1); WWII: 4 × Bofors 283 mm gun M/1912 (2×2); 6 × 152 mm/50 cal. Bofors QF M/1912 (6×1); 4 × 75 mm/60 cal. Bofors AA M/1928 (2×2); 6 × 40 mm/56 cal. Bofors AA M/1936 (3×2); 4 × 25 mm/58 cal. Bofors AA M/1932 (2×2); 3 × 20 mm/66 cal. Bofors AA M/1940 (3×1); 4 × 8 mm/75.8 cal. AA MG M/1936 (2×2)
- Armour: Belt 200 mm (8 in); Turrets 200 mm (8 in); Citadel 100 mm (4 in); Deck 18–28 mm (1–1 in)

HSwMS Gustaf V, (Note: "HSwMS" stands for "His Swedish Majesty's Ship", this prefix is sometimes used by Swedish ships outside of Sweden's territorial waters to differentiate them from ships of the United Kingdom's Royal Navy. In Swedish territorial waters the prefix "HMS" is used, standing for "Hans Majestäts Skepp", or "His Majesty's Ship" in Swedish.) in Swedish HM Pansarskepp Gustaf V (His Majesty's Armoured Ship Gustaf V) was a Sverige-class coastal defence ship of the Swedish Navy. The vessel was the third and last ship in the Sverige class along with HSwMS Sverige and HSwMS Drottning Victoria. Gustaf V was launched on 15 September 1917 at Kockums in Malmö and delivered to the Navy on 9 January 1922. The design consisted of four 28 cm cannon and a secondary armament of eight 15.2 cm cannon. During the interwar period, the ship underwent several modernizations and was one of the most powerful vessels in the fleet during the Second World War. The ship was put in reserve in 1948, was decommissioned in 1957 and was later sold for scrapping in Karlskrona. However, the ship remained at Berga Academy of War as of 1968. Two of the ship's 15.2 cm guns are preserved in the battery at Häggmansberget in the defensive Kalix Line, around Kalix.

== Design ==
Gustaf V was 121.6 m (398 ft 11 in) long, 18.63 m (61 ft 1 in) wide and had a depth of 6.25 m (20 ft 6 in) . The hull was made of nitrated steel in overlapping plates with an armored belt at the waterline and on the citadel. The prow was designed with a forward-sloping Atlantic bow which gave her the ability to act as an icebreaker. Unlike her sister ship HSwMS Sverige, Gustaf V was not designed as a flagship but instead received two bunks for 22 cadets and engineers.

=== Machinery ===
The machinery consisted of twelve coal-fired boilers that delivered steam to two steam turbines. The boilers were placed in two groups of six, which necessitated two funnels. The boilers delivered steam to two independent turbine assemblies with a high-pressure turbocharger and a low-pressure turbine. The turbine movement was transmitted to each propeller shaft via a 17.23: 1 gear ratio which allowed turbines to operate at a rotational speed of about 3,459 RPM and propellers at 200 RPM. This method gave the machinery better efficiency than HSwMS Sverige, which did not have a reduction gear. This resulted in an increased power output by 20 percent. In addition, coal consumption decreased, which increased the ships range. Gustaf V's machinery developed 22,000 horsepower, which gave the vessel a speed of 23.2 knots.

=== Armament ===
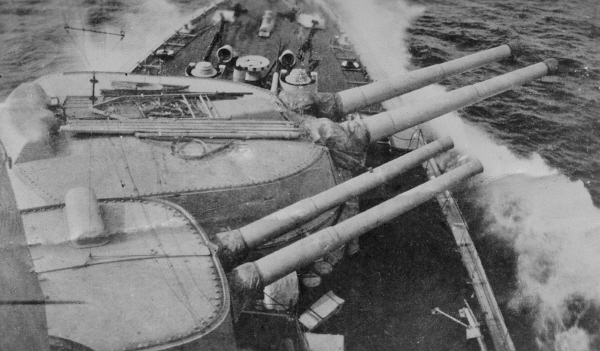
Forward 28 cm and 15.2 cm cannon.

The main artillery on Gustaf V consisted of four 28 cm M/12 guns placed in two double turrets, one forward and one aft. The projectiles weighed 306 kg (675 lb) with a range of 19,600 m (21,400 yd). The secondary artillery consisted of eight 15.2 cm cannons. These were placed in six single turrets, three on each side of the superstructure, and a twin turret staggered above the front 28 cm cannon. The light artillery consisted of four 75 mm cannons and furthermore there were two 57 mm cannons, two 6.5 mm machine guns and two 45.7 cm underwater torpedo tubes in the bow.

== History ==
=== Construction and delivery ===
Gustaf V was laid down in spring 1915 at Kockums in Malmö. With HSwMS Sverige already being launched the shipyard had access to the original drawings, which meant that the construction work started well. However, as the First World War progressed, it became increasingly difficult to obtain materials, especially those that had to be acquired outside the country. In particular armored plates ordered from the United States were delayed, which caused delays in construction.

On 31 January 1918, the ship was launched in the presence of Crown Prince Gustaf VI Adolf. Before launching, there was anxiety that as the ship slipped into the water it would hit the opposite side of the harbor basin, as the distance to this was considered short and the ship's weight was so great. To prevent a collision with the basin edge heavy chains were attached to the ship which would help arrest its momentum and at the edge of the basin were laid wooden logs that would help dampen a possible collision. The launching proved successful when the chains effectively braked the ship before reaching the quayside.

During fitting out work after the launch, the problems with material procurement became even more pronounced. In addition, there was a strong labor shortage in 1917–1920 which forced the yards to request breaking the contract. Due to the belief in disarmament and peace after the First World War, there were also proposals to remove the armor and build HSwMS Gustaf V and HSwMS Drottning Victoria as passenger ships. Nothing came of this however and in the winter of 1921/1922 Gustaf V was ready to conduct sea trials. During these trials it appeared that the new propeller machinery, with the reduction gear that some had doubted, worked satisfactorily.

The total cost of Gustaf V was 14,220,000 Swedish Krona. The sum is equal to today's monetary value (annual average 2016) of approximately 356,825,250 SEK or 44,022,000 USD. In addition to this appropriation, a sum of SEK 1,293,295 was received, which was awarded by an arbitration panel after it the shipyard requested extra money due to increased costs from procurement difficulties.

=== Interwar ===
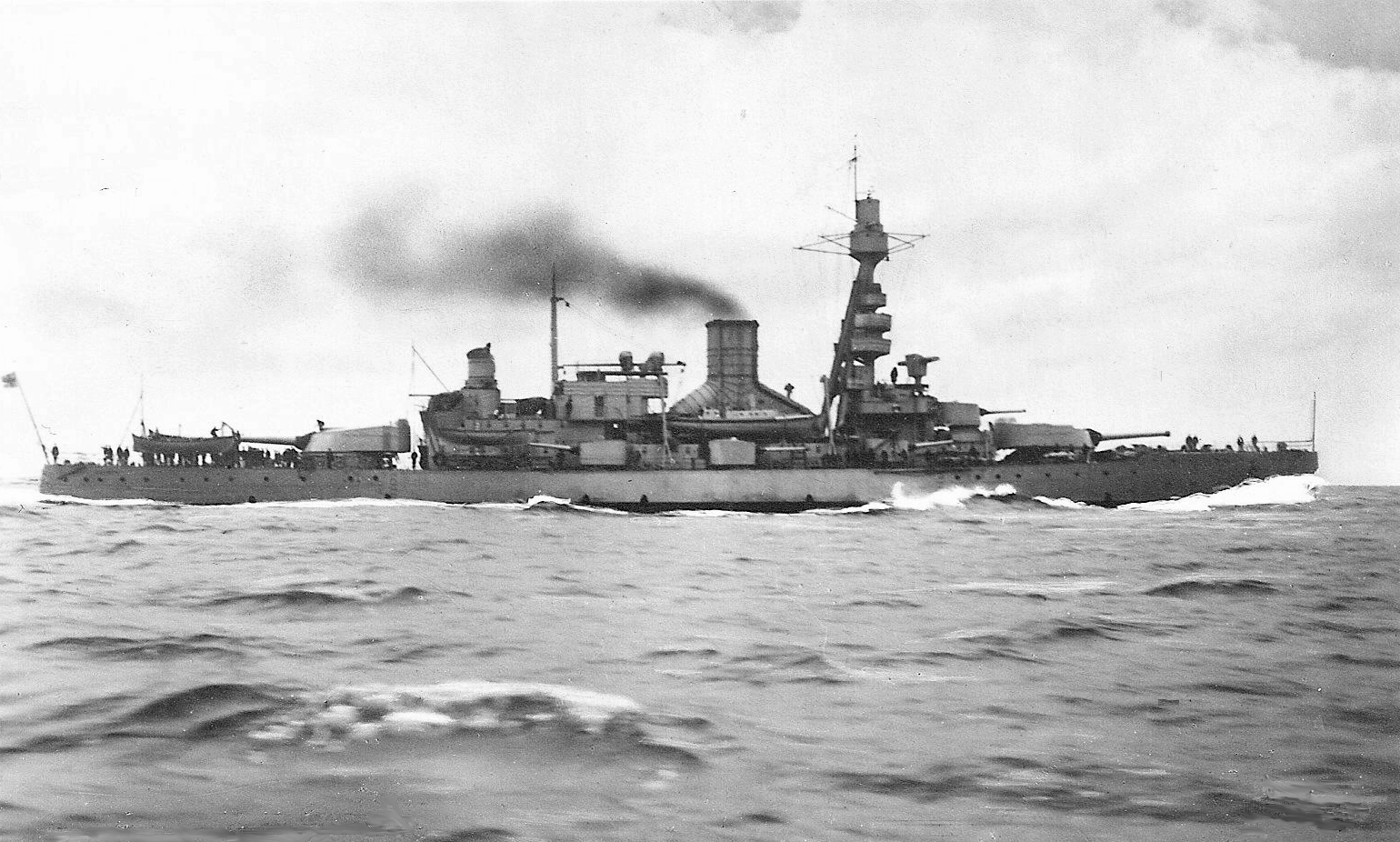
Gustaf V in 1930 after refit and merged funnels.

After the First World War, Sweden's relationship with her newly independent neighbors, Finland and the three Baltic States, had become increasingly busier, and in order to show the Swedish Government's goodwill during the early 1920s several official exercises were conducted in these countries. On 5 July 1924, Gustaf V joined together with HSwMS Drottning Victoria and four minelayers on a transit to Tallinn, and then together with the entire Swedish Coastal Fleet, a total of 36 ships, to Helsinki. In the summer of 1926, Gustaf V and HSwMS Sverige visited Copenhagen in connection with exercises in the southern Baltic.

In 1927–1930 Gustaf V underwent her first major modernization. The forward mast was converted into a tripod mast in which a lookout post and a rangefinder were placed. The mast height was reduced, the ventilation system improved, and the old torpedo rooms were converted to artillery control centers. In addition, a new deckhouse was built on the superstructure in the stern for accommodations and fittings and an expanded bridge for the Chief of the Navy were built. Furthermore, an anti-aircraft control center was built, and the two forward funnels were combined.

Due to the death of Victoria of Baden, the Swedish Queen, in the spring of 1930, Gustaf V went with HSwMS Drottning Victoria and the destroyers HSwMS Ehrensköld and HSwMS Nordenskjöld to the then German city of Swinemünde, arriving on 9 April. After the Queen's remains was carried onto HSwMS Drottning Victoria the ships returned to Stockholm, where the Queen's remains were landed by the royal barge Vasaorden.

On 4 April 1933, Gustaf V ran aground off Malmö. She was refloated on 6 April 1933.

In the years 1936–1938 a modernization was carried out when six of the coal boilers were replaced with two oil fired boilers, with some of the coal storage converted to oil tanks. In addition, the ammunition stores for the main and secondary artillery were built-up, and the 15.2 cm double turret above the bow 28 cm turret was replaced with four 40 mm Bofors. In addition, the 90 cm searchlights were replaced with 110 cm searchlights.

On 9 March 1939, a large air defense exercise was carried out in Karlskrona. During a flight landing in the dark, an aircraft collided with Gustaf V's combat mast, killing two people from the airplane's crew.

=== Second World War ===
At the outbreak of World War II, Gustaf V was the flagship of the Coastal Fleet. On the night of 17 July 1940 during an exercise west of Gotland one of the boilers exploded. Eight people in the boiler room were killed instantly, and two people who were on the deck near one of the air intakes were badly injured. These two were taken by a minelayer to Visby Hospital, where they later died. Gustaf V then went to the mainland, and at Hårsfjärden the commanding admiral and his staff moved to HSwMS Sverige, which then served as flagship during the remainder of the war. After the explosion Gustaf V was taken to Stockholm's naval yards for repair. After one month the ship was able to return to service.

After the Second World War, Gustaf V participated in a ceremony in Stockholm when King Gustaf V thanked the Navy for their vigilant guard during the war years. The ship then returned to Karlskrona, where the ship was modernized with the installation of a new radar facility. When HSwMS Sverige was taken out of active service with the Coastal Fleet in 1947, Gustaf V took over the role of the Swedish flagship once again.

== Disposal ==
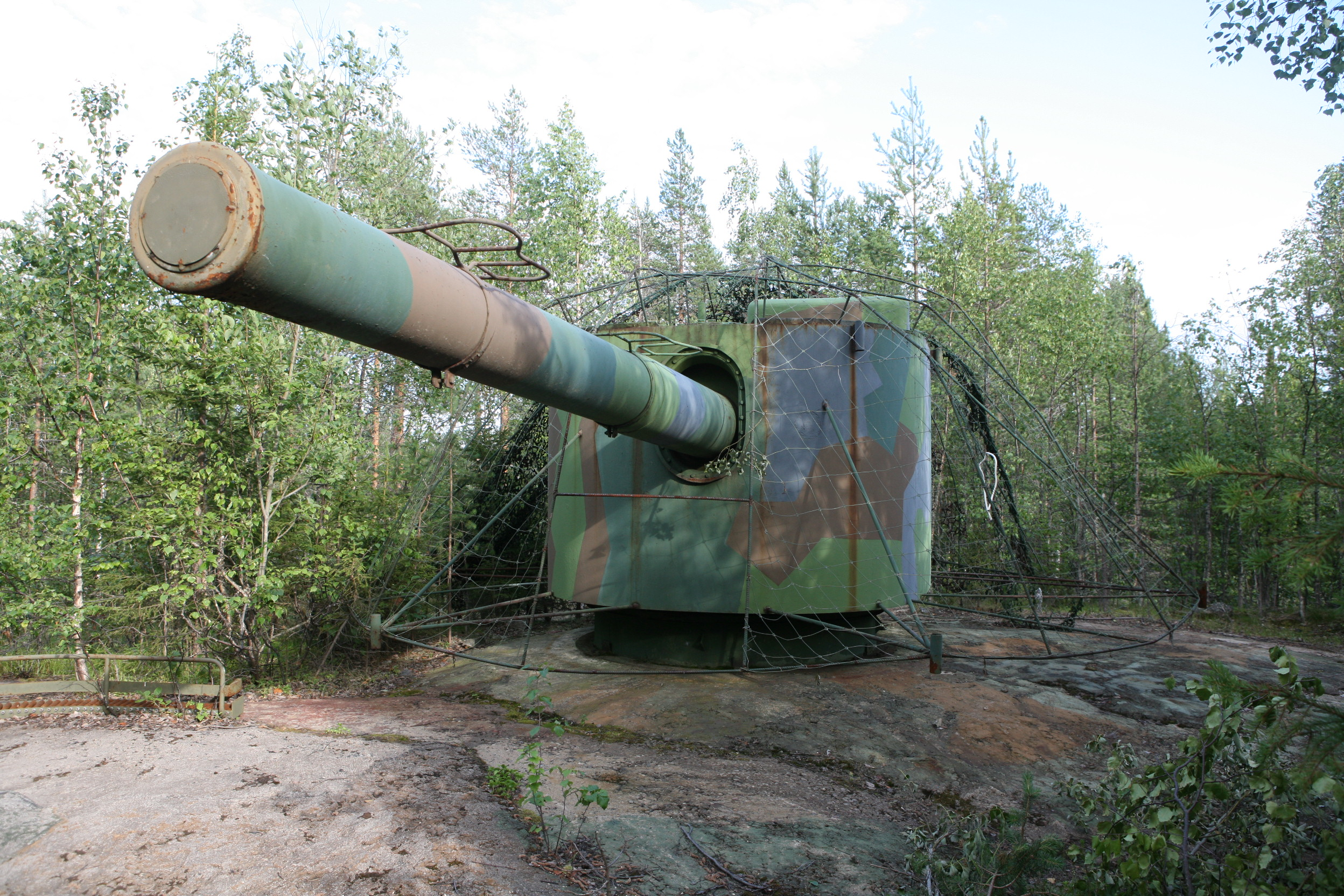
One of the 15.2 cm guns of Gustaf V in 2010

Gustaf V was released from the fleet on 1 April 1957. She was supposed to be released to Karlskrona, however she lay at Berga Naval Base, south of Stockholm until 1967. While there she was used as a mooring point for destroyers and smaller ships. Two of the ship's 15.2 cm cannons were moved after the erection of the Kalix Line in Norrbotten, where they were used as fortified cannons at Häggmansberget.

In 1970 she was sold for scrapping in Gothenburg.
