= Bofors 105 mm Coastal Automatic Gun L/54 =

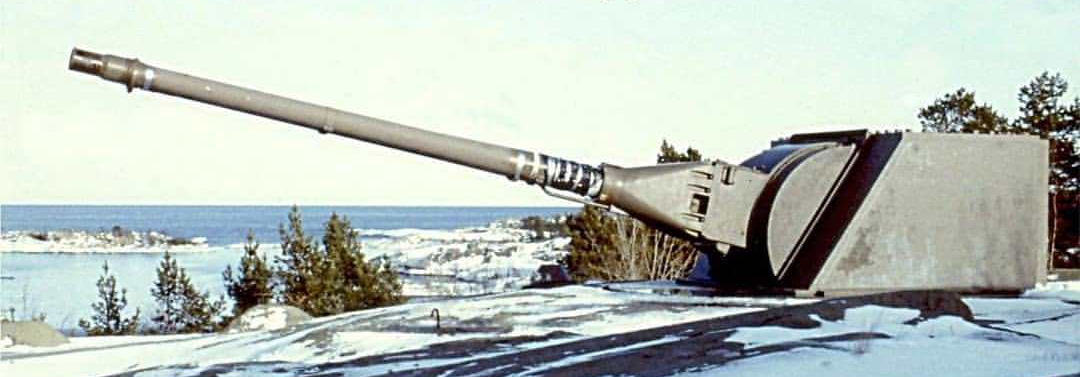
- A Bofors 105 mm Coastal Automatic Gun L/54 turret without concrete or granite embedding
- Type: Coastal Artillery
- Place of origin: Sweden

Service history
- In service: 1962–2000
- Used by: Sweden

Production history
- Designer: Bofors
- Designed: 1950
- Manufacturer: Bofors
- Produced: 1957–1965
- No. built: 6 (Swedish service)

Specifications
- Mass: ~75,000 kg (165,000 lb)
- Barrel length: 5,670 mm (18 ft 7 in) (barrel lining)
- Crew: 12
- Shell: 105 × 778 mm R (m/50)
- Caliber: 105 mm (4.1 in) L/54
- Action: Automatic extraction and integrated cam-operated recoil powered autoloader
- Breech: Vertical sliding-wedge
- Recoil: 370 mm (15 in)
- Carriage: Armored fixed turret
- Elevation: -5°/+70°, 25°/s
- Traverse: 360°, 25°/s
- Rate of fire: 35 rounds/min
- Muzzle velocity: 850 m/s (2,800 ft/s)
- Maximum firing range: 21 km (13 mi)

Bofors 105 mm Coastal Automatic Gun L/54 (full English product name: Bofors 105 mm Automatic Gun L/54 In Turret For Coastal Defence), was a Swedish fully automatic dual purpose gun turret system for coastal defence designed by Bofors around the turn of the decade 1950 for use in the Swedish Coastal Artillery and for export. It was the first modern weapon system designed for the Swedish Coastal Artillery and was designed to be embedded in concrete or granite mixes for camouflage and protection.

Development started in the late 1940s, and the construction of 6 gun installations based on this system was offered by Bofors in 1950. Various problems plagued the design and construction process and the last gun installation was not finished and ready for operational use until 1968, 12 years behind schedule.

== History ==
In 1949 the Inspector of the Coastal Artillery (IKA) ordered an investigation concerning the replacement of numerous older, and for the most part, completely obsolete artillery system with model years stretching as far back as the late 1800s. Most of these had been hastily built during World War II using old naval guns in very simple emplacements which were not designed with endurance and high survivability in mind. Protection from nuclear weapons was non-existing and collective BC protection was very limited usually requiring most of the gun crews to wear gas masks. Finally, most of the older guns were 57 mm designs and lacked the firepower to be an effective defense against an invasion.

In 1950 Bofors offered 6 fully automatic 105 mm guns in armored coastal defence turrets, to be delivered in 1953 to 1954. The offer was accepted but delivery got delayed to late 1957 due to a variety of problems at Bofors. One of the guns (which ended up becoming Gun #2 at Nåttarö) also had its breech damaged somewhere in the process. This was repaired and the gun delivered anyway. All of the guns went to the Stockholm area where the need to replace older systems was deemed the most urgent.

In Swedish service the gun initially received the designation 10,5 cm automatkanon m/50 ('10,5 cm akan m/50), meaning "10.5 cm autocannon m/50", but around 1970 the weapon was redesignated to 10,5 cm tornautomatpjäs m/50 (10,5 cm tapjäs m/50), meaning "10.5 cm turret automatic piece m/50" (literal) or "10.5 cm automatic turret gun m/50" (formal).

== System description ==
The six guns were split into three batteries consisting of two guns each. They were built in such a way that each gun in a battery could be targeted individually, that is, the battery's fire could be split between two targets. Each gun emplacement was designed to be completely self-sufficient and in the case of Battery Arholma, they were spread across two islands.

=== Turret and gun system ===
The Bofors 105 mm L/54 system consists of an armored turret which is unmanned above ground, and an automatic magazine. The gun is a fully automatic, water-cooled sliding-wedge design which is automatically laid in both traverse and elevation. It uses fixed ammunition which is fed from a magazine several meters below the gun turret. Spent cartridges are ejected from a hatch on the turret's rear face. Bofors 105 mm L/54 system is known for a switch located in the magazine which is marked "war-peace" (krig-fred). This selected between half and the full rate of fire and was normally locked in the "peace" position using a padlock. The lower rate of fire was normally used in peacetime because it meant less wear on the various mechanical systems.

Bofors 105 mm L/54 turret with granite embedding

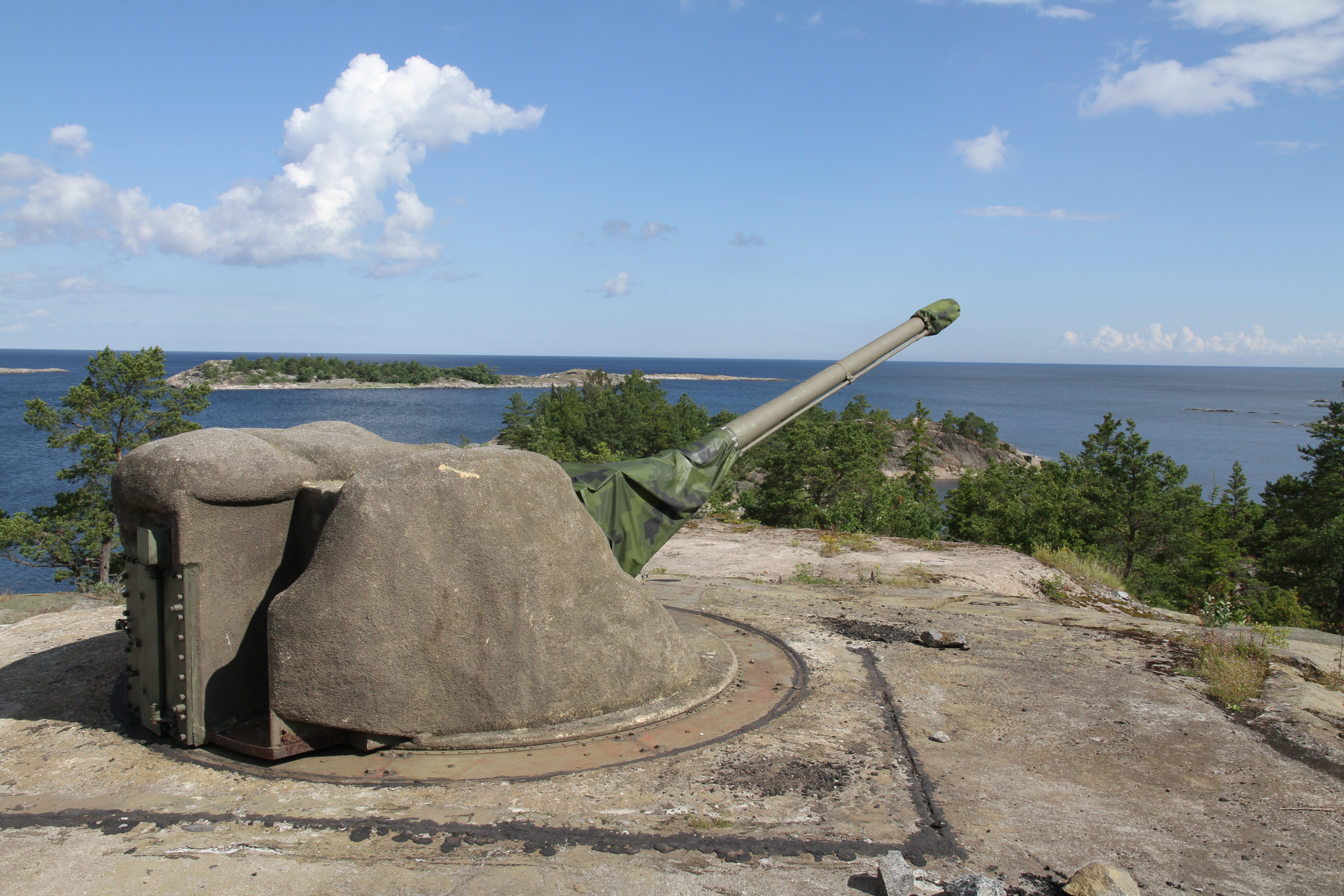
10,5 cm tapjäs m/50 at northern Arholma, Sweden. This is the last gun of its type left

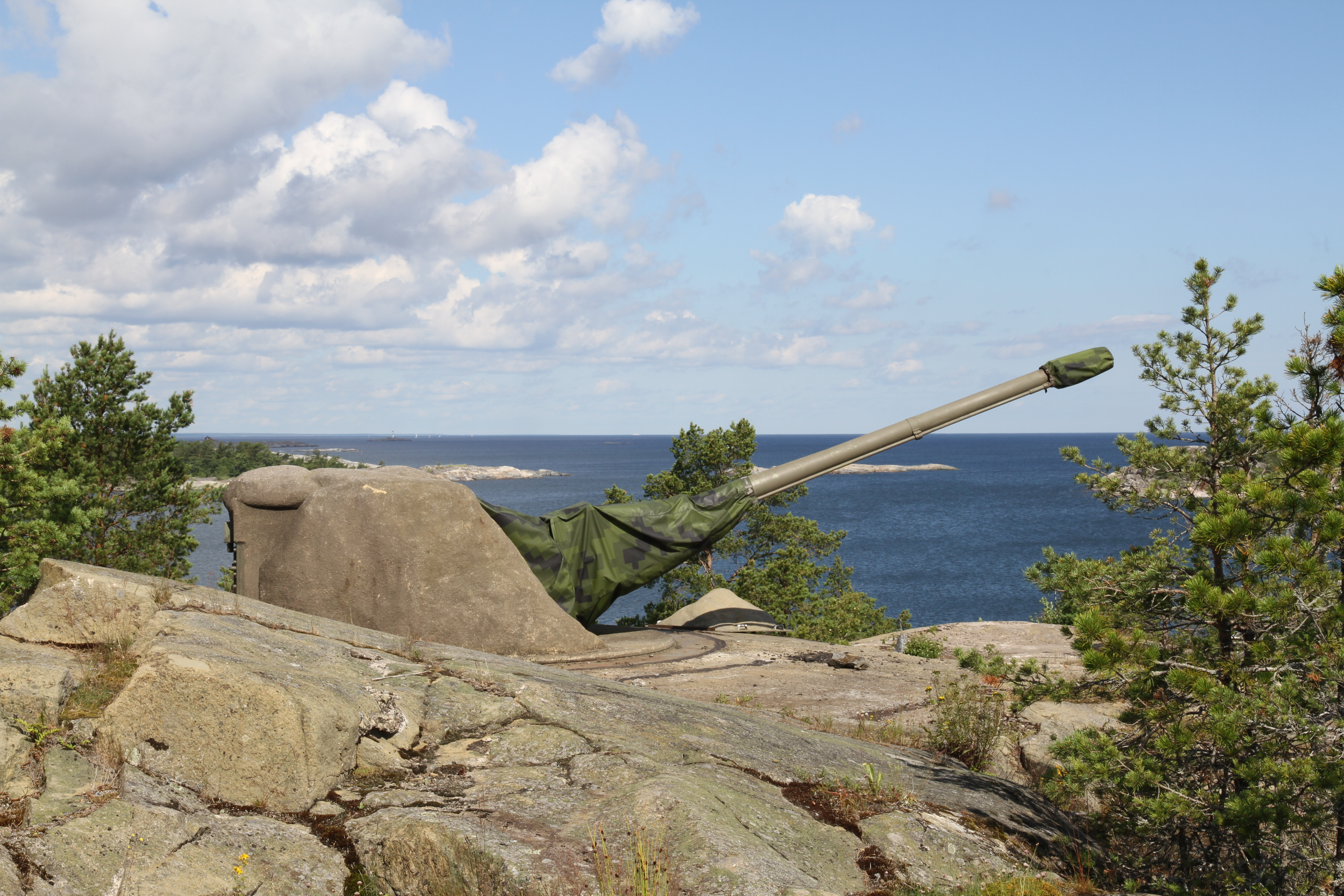
Surviving Bofors 105 mm L/54 turret, here shown from the side

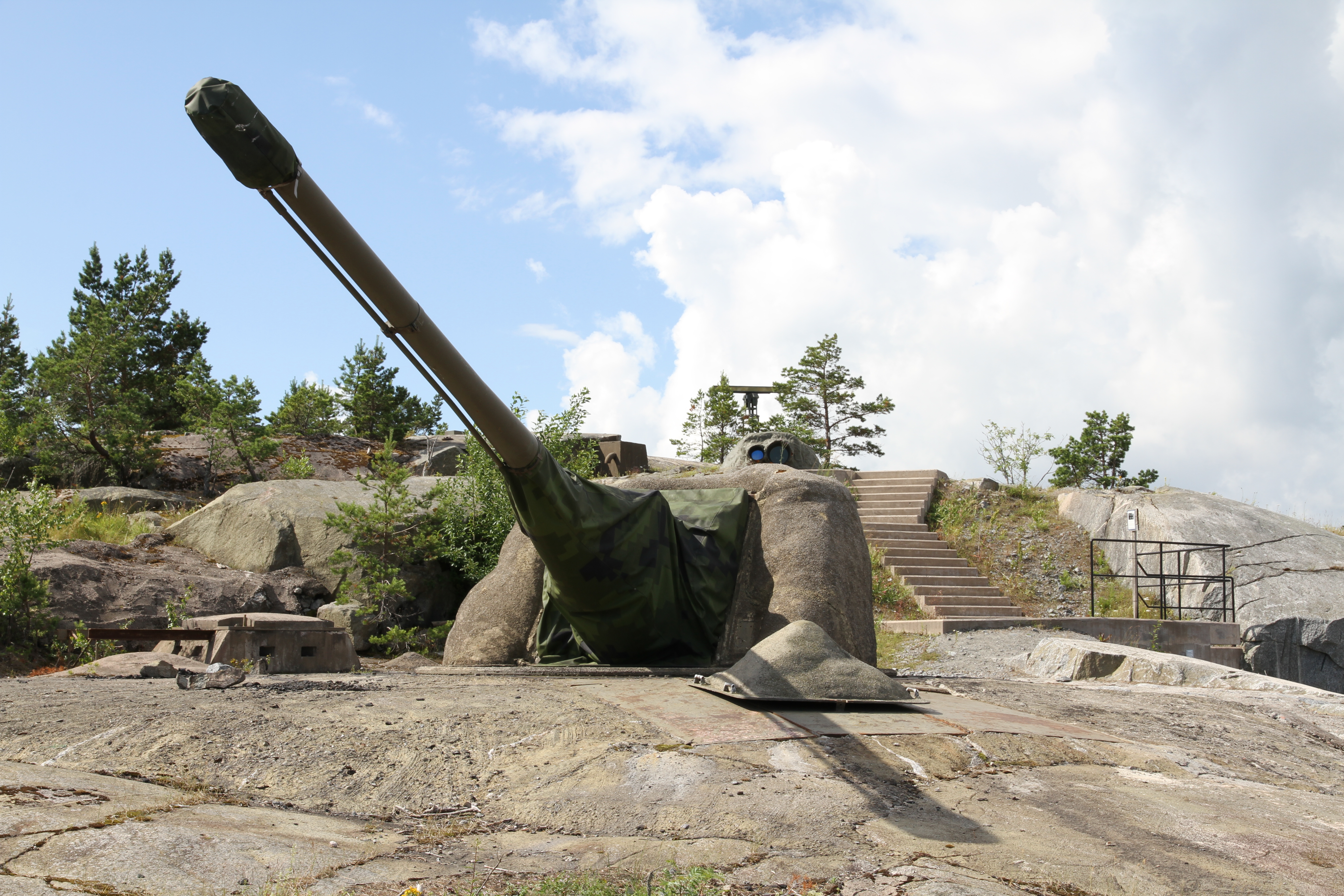
Surviving Bofors 105 mm L/54 turret, here shown from the front

=== Supporting installation ===
Each gun is supported by an installation built in a tunnel connected to the gun turret and magazine. This installation provides fire control, power supply and accommodation for the gun crew and is designed to provide power, food and water for weeks despite being sealed off from the outside world.
It uses an older construction technique, pioneered in the 1920s and common in the 1950s, which involved blasting a large tunnel inside of which a concrete building was erected. A non-military but very visible example of this construction technique are the older stations of the Stockholm Metro. This technique proved inadequate when better research on the effects of nuclear weapons became available. It is debated that the concrete structures which were rigidly built on the tunnel floor could collapse from the ground shockwave of a nearby nuclear detonation. Starting in the 1960s, all newer installations were built with steel-framed structures isolated from the surrounding rock with some type of elastic dampers (springs, rubber blocks, etc.).

=== Fire Control System ===
As built, the Bofors 105 mm L/54 system used a mechanical fire control computer called Ci 709 built by the Dutch company Hollandse Signaalapparaten (HoSa). This occupied 2 floors in the fire control section of the installation. For surveillance and ranging, a periscope and radar was installed which fed into the computer.

Fire Control System

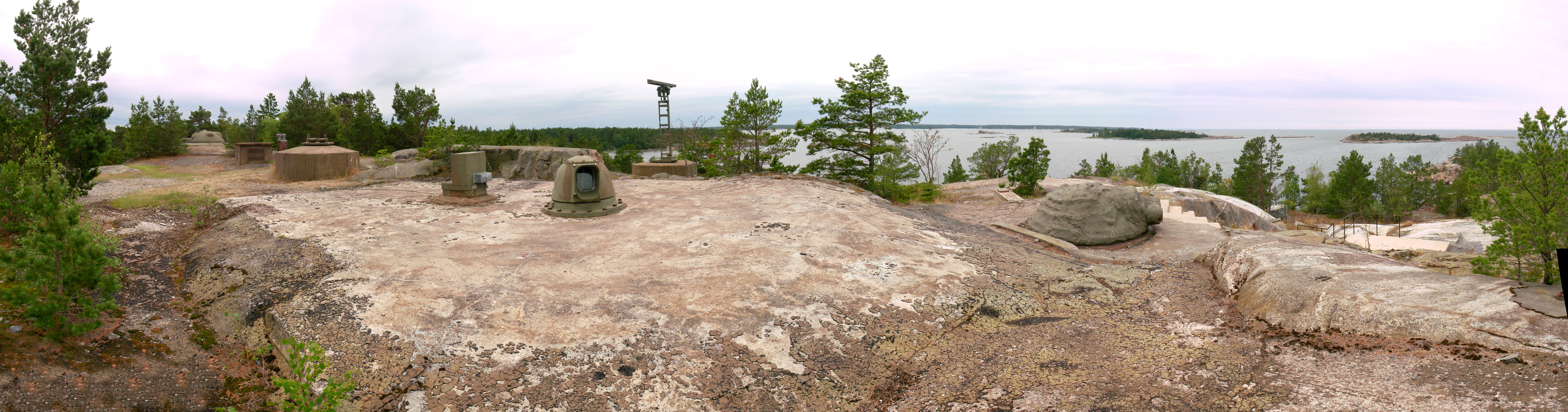
Surviving fire control equipment at Arholma 1

== Locations ==
Gun No.	Designator	Name	Location	Completed
1	AH1	Arholma 1	Arholma, Uppland	1962
2	AH2	Arholma 2	Ovanskär, NE of Arholma	1968
3	BR1	Bodskär 1	Bodskär	1960
4	BR2	Bodskär 2	Bodskär	1960
5	NÅ1	Nåttarö 1	Nåttarö	1960
6	NÅ2	Nåttarö 2	Nåttarö	1960

== Operational history ==
- Arholma, 1960: A fire in a storage shed seriously damaged the parts for turret #2, designated for Ovanskär. This delayed its installation with several years.
- Nåttarö, 1960s: Gun #1 malfunctioned several times due to premature wear of various parts and other technical problems.
- Nåttarö, 1984: An explosion occurred in turret #2. One man was killed instantly while 4 others suffered burns but survived. The subsequent investigation concluded that the firing system malfunctioned in such a way that it allowed the gun to fire before the breech had fully closed, thus causing much of the propellant gases to enter the magazine spaces below. The turret was repaired and returned to service.

== Modifications and final disposal ==
When the Bofors 105 mm L/54 system was first designed and built, its nuclear protection was thought to be pretty good, based on the knowledge concerning the effects of nuclear weapons available at the time. However, as more research became available, the protection of most parts of the system had to be downrated quite a bit. Nevertheless, Bofors 105 mm L/54 system was a highly effective weapon system, mainly owing to its very high rate of fire, which meant a large volume of ammunition could be placed on a target.
In the 1980s, when the coastal artillery decided not to use the option to order more 12/70 systems, the fire control systems meant for those installations were redirected to replace older systems. This meant that all Bofors 105 mm L/54 system installations received a modern ArtE 724 digital fire control system, complete with the new HSRR fortified radar system and AML 702 laser rangefinder and low-light TV system. The installations were also updated with new communications, including the STRIKA 85 computerized command and control system, as well as a general renovation of the accommodation spaces.
A decision in 1999 meant that all coastal artillery systems would be disbanded in line with the Swedish government's new take on defense. The Bofors 105 mm L/54 system installations were dismantled in the early 2000s, with only Arholma 1 being retained as a State Construction Memorial. It opened as a museum for the 2008 season and is mostly open during the summer, but may be visited any time of the year by groups if booked in advance.
