= Emanuel af Geijerstam =

Swedish ironmaster (1730–1788)

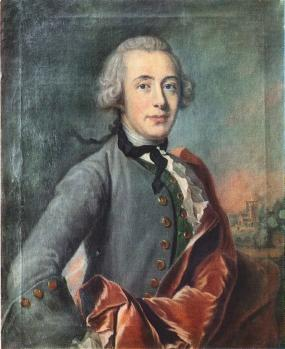
- Emanuel af Geijerstam
- Born: Emanuel Geijer; 10 October 1730; Uddeholm, Sweden
- Died: 24 September 1788 (aged 57); Filipstad, Sweden
- Noble family: af Geijerstam
- Spouse: Sara Helena Piscator (m. 1753)
- Father: Bengt Geijer
- Mother: Lovisa Sophia Tranæa
- Occupation: Ironmaster; Politician

Emanuel af Geijerstam (Swedish pronunciation: [ɑːv ˈjɛ̂jːɛˌʂʈam]; 10 October 1730 – 24 September 1788) was a Swedish ironmaster and politician.

== Early life and work ==
Born in Uddeholm in Värmland, Sweden on October 10, 1730, to Bengt Gustaf Geijer and Lovisa Sophia Tranæa, Geijer married Sara Helena Piscator in 1753 and had children. He was admitted as a student at Uppsala University in 1749.

Geijerstam served as a director at the Uddeholm Works, a privately held company, from 1753 to 1767, which later developed into the multinational steel producer Uddeholms AB. In 1770, he obtained the Bofors Works from his brother Johan Eberhard Geijer.

Geijerstam lived in Alkvettern Manor located in Bjurtjärn socken. He received the Royal Order of Vasa and was ennobled in 1773 at Loka Brunn by Gustav III, thus the progenitor of the noble family af Geijerstam.
