= Sverige-class coastal defence ship =

Class of Swedish Navy warships, 1917–1957

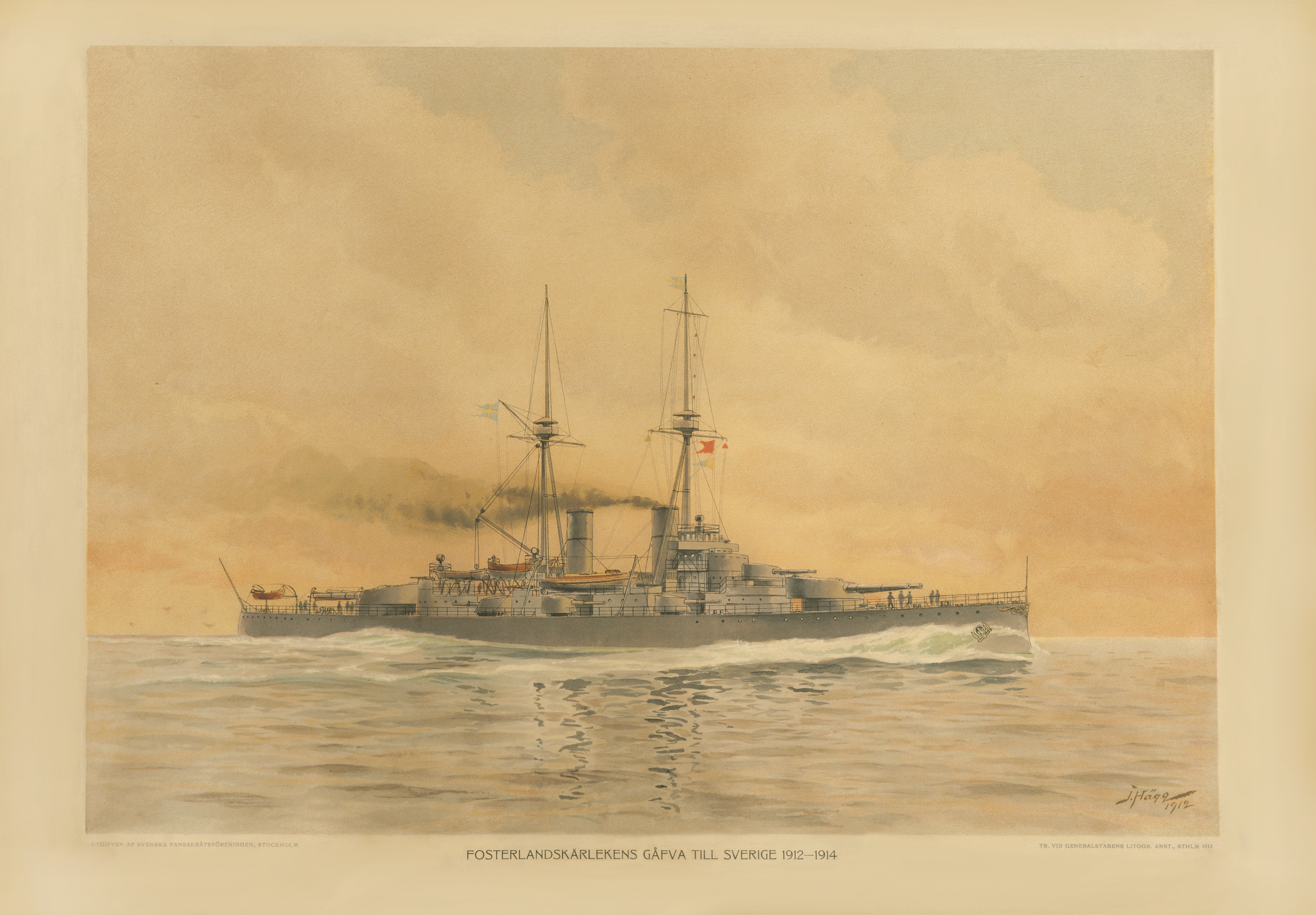
- A 1912 depiction of Sverige

Class overview
- Name: Sverige class
- Builders: Götaverken, Gothenburg (2 ships); Kockums, Malmö (1 ship)
- Operators: Swedish Navy
- Preceded by: Oscar II
- Built: 1912–1922
- In commission: 1917–1957
- Completed: 3
- Scrapped: 3

General characteristics
- Type: Coastal defence ship
- Displacement: 7,239 tonnes standard, 7,755 tonnes full load; (Sverige: 6,961 tonnes tons standard, 7,758 tons deep load)
- Length: 121.6 m (399 ft); (Sverige: 120 m (390 ft))
- Beam: 18.6 m (61 ft)
- Draught: 6.2 m (20 ft)
- Propulsion: original 12 Yarrow type coal-fired boilers, upgraded to oil-fired boilers in the 1930s; Sverige 4-shaft direct drive turbines; Drottning Victoria and Gustav V 2-shaft geared turbines
- Speed: Drottning Victoria and Gustav V 23.5 kn (43.5 km/h; 27.0 mph); Sverige 22.5 kn (41.7 km/h; 25.9 mph)
- Complement: 427 (standard); 443 (as flagship)
- Armament: 4 × 283 mm (11 in)/ 45 cal. guns in two twin turrets; 8 × 152 mm (6 in)/ 50 cal. guns in one twin turret and six single mounts; 6 × 75 mm (3 in)/ 50 cal. guns in single mounts; 2 × 57 mm (2.2 in) guns; 2 × machine guns; 2 × 460 mm (18 in) fixed torpedo tubes
- Armour: Main belt 200 mm (7.9 in); Deck 45 mm (2 in); Turrets 200 mm (8 in); Control tower 175 mm (7 in)

The Sverige-class coastal defence ships were a class of coastal defence ships that, at the time of introduction, were the largest ships to serve in the Swedish Navy. Their design was completely new and was influenced by the ships of the time. Their armament consisted of four 283 mm (11 in)/45 cal. Bofors guns in two turrets and eight 152 mm (6 in) Bofors guns in one double and six single turrets. During the Second World War they were the backbone of the Swedish Navy.

== Specifications ==
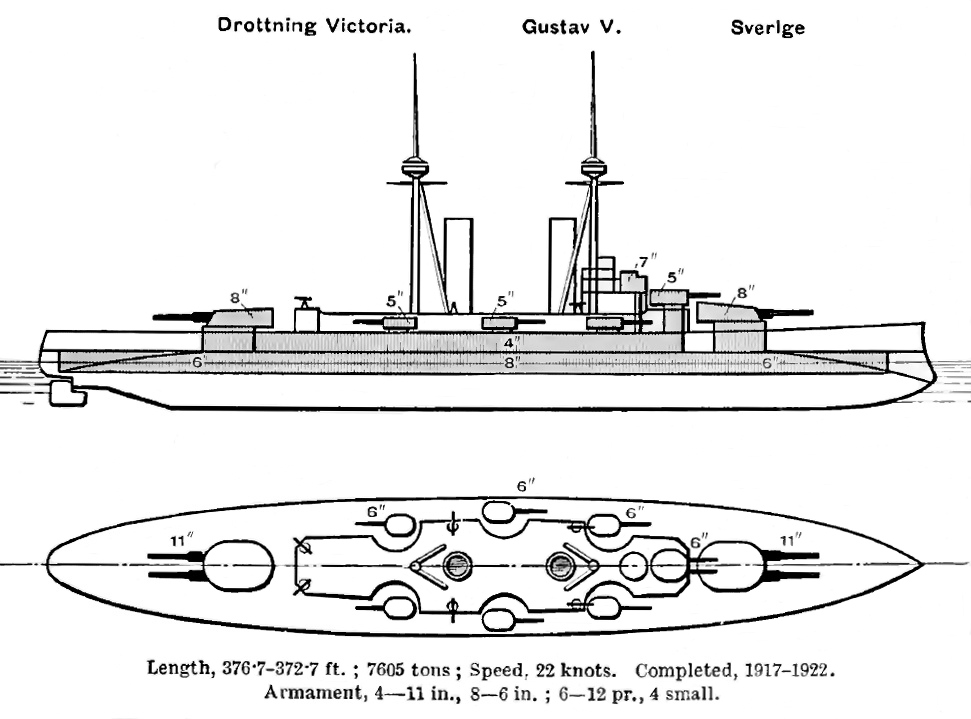
Right elevation and deck plan as depicted in Brassey's Naval Annual, 1923

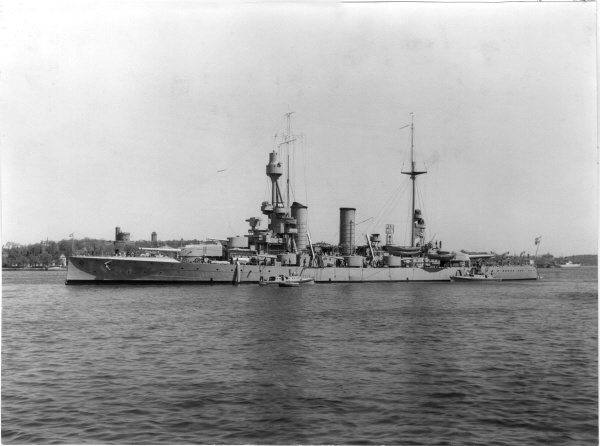
Sverige after her 1924-1925 refit

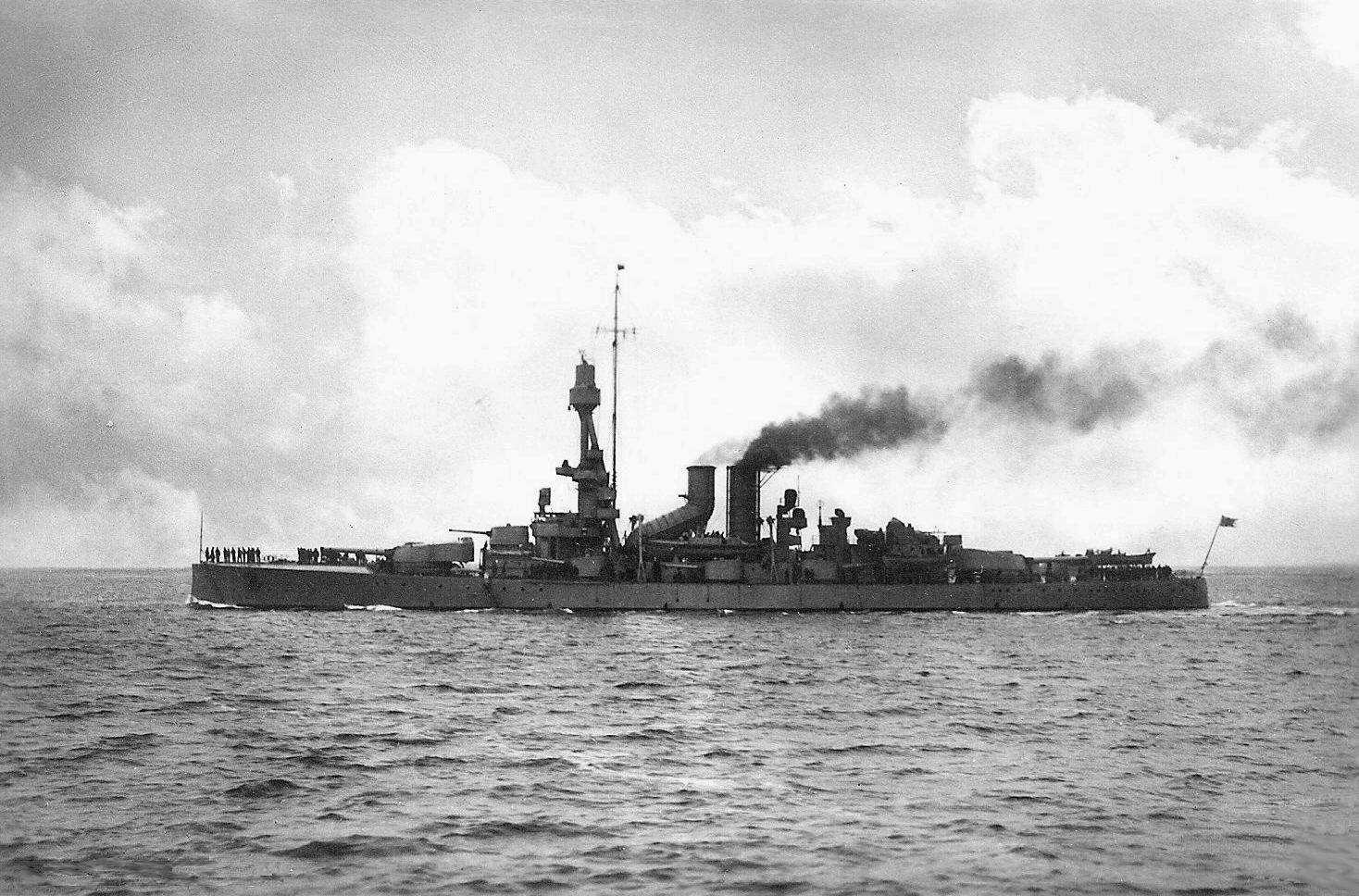
Sverige after her 1931-1933 refit

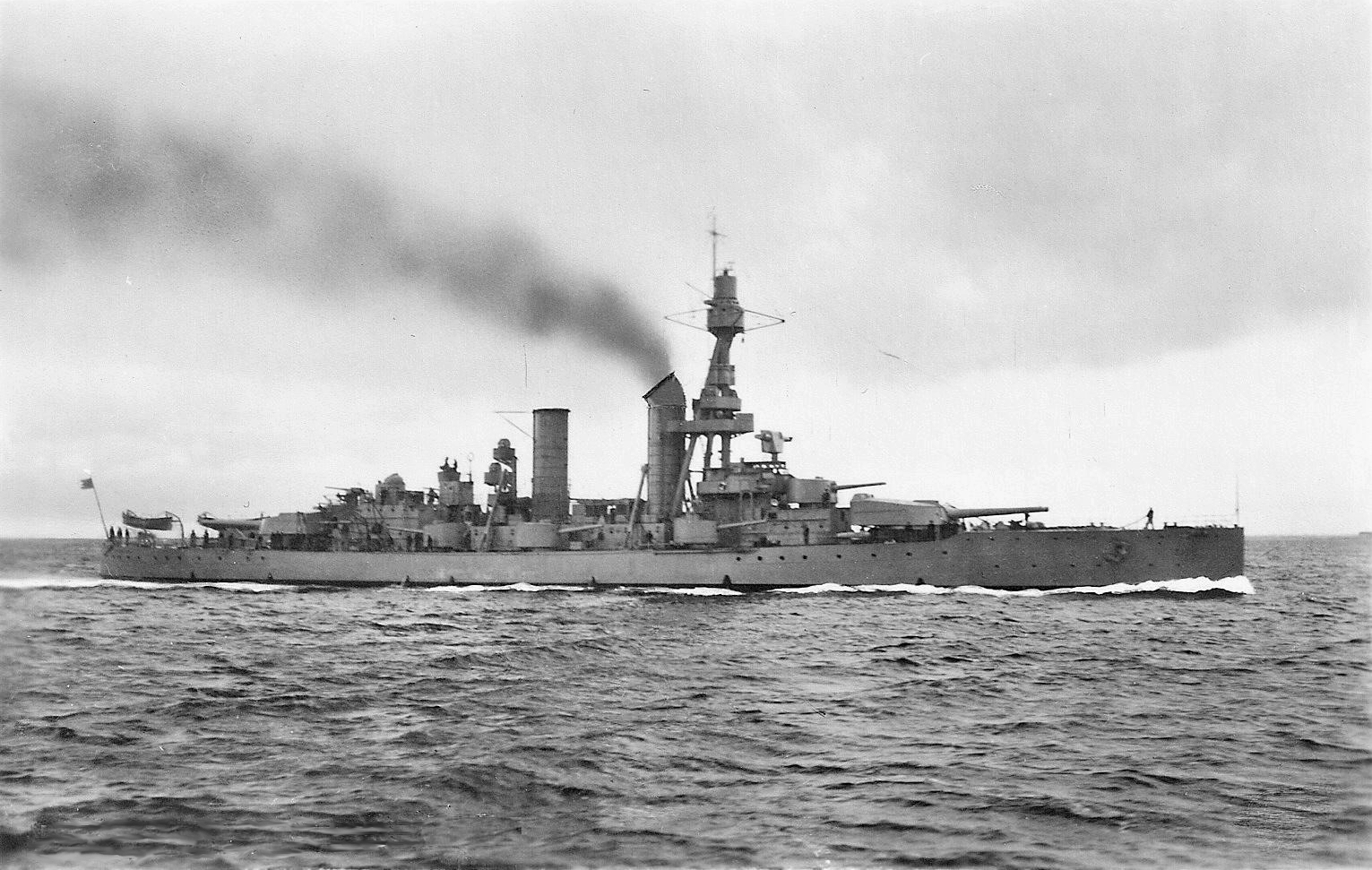
Drottning Victoria after 1931

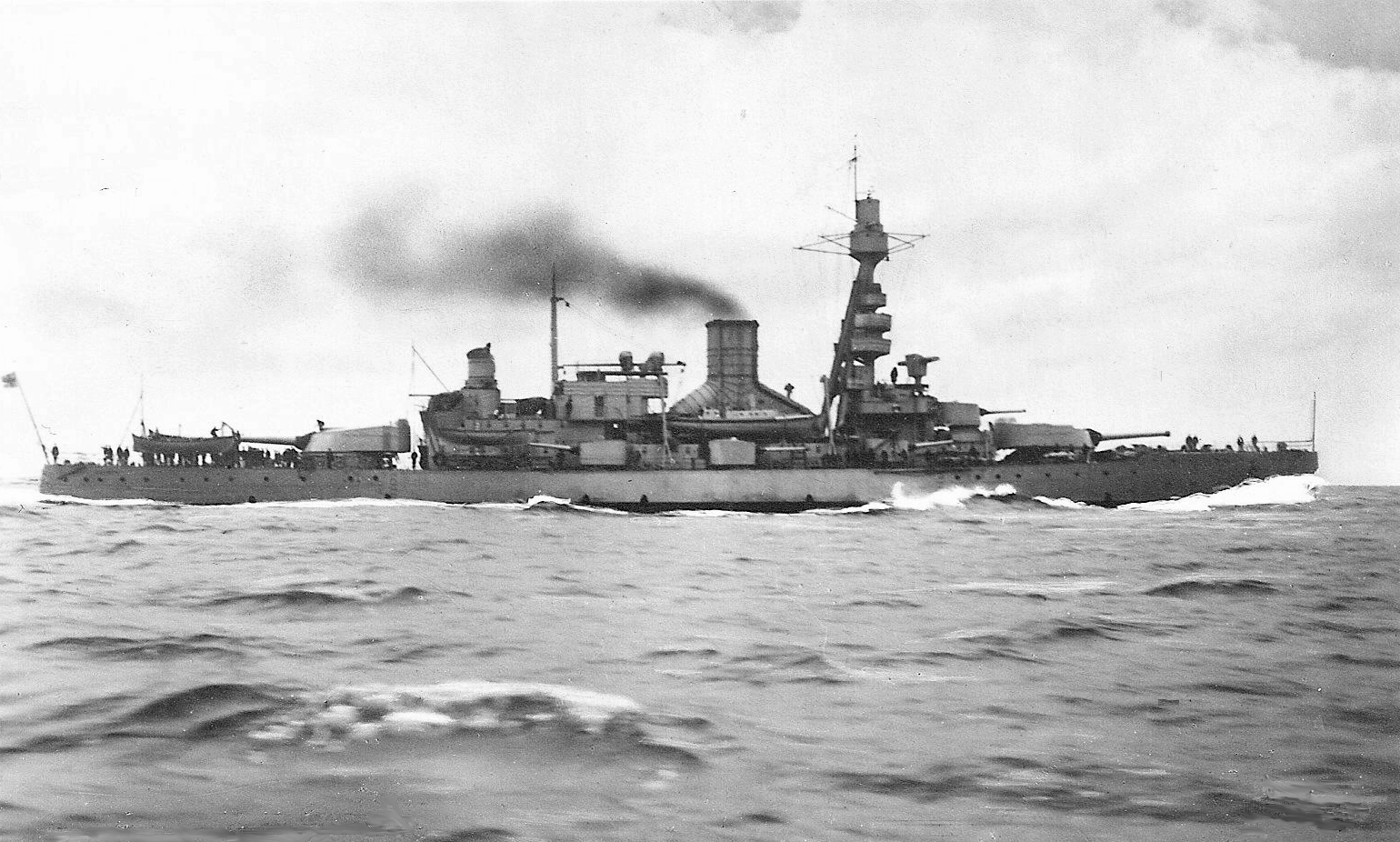
Gustaf V after 1930

=== Displacement ===
- HSwMS Sverige
  - 6,852 tons standard;
  - 7,516 tons full load,
  - 7,080 tons - Jane's Fighting Ships 1938
    - Sverige reconstructed 1932–1933
- HSwMS Drottning Victoria and HSwMS Gustaf V:
  - 7,125 tons standard
  - 7,633 tons full load
  - 7,120 tons - Drottning Victoria - Jane's Fighting Ships 1938
  - 7,275 tons - Gustaf V - Jane's Fighting Ships 1938
    - Gustaf V reconstructed 1929–1930, modernized 1937
    - Drottning Victoria reconstructed 1935

=== Dimensions ===
- Length: 120 m (390 ft) - Sverige
- Length: 121.6 m (399 ft) - Drottning Victoria and Gustaf V
- Breadth: 18.6 m (61 ft)
- Draught: 6.3 m (21 ft) - Sverige
- Draught: 6.2 m (20 ft) - Drottning Victoria and Gustaf V

=== Armour ===
- Main belt: 200 mm (7.9 in) between barbettes, then 100 mm (3.9 in) and 60 mm (2.4 in) sections
- Upper belt: 100 mm (3.9 in) from just behind fore barbette to aft barbette
- Main turret: 200 mm (7.9 in) front, 100 mm (3.9 in) side, 50 mm (2.0 in) roof
- Main barbettes: 150 mm (5.9 in)
- Secondary turrets: 125 mm (4.9 in)
- Secondary barbettes: 100 mm (3.9 in)
- Conning Tower: 175 mm (6.9 in)
- Deck: 45 to 30 mm (1.8 to 1.2 in)

=== Machinery ===
- 4 shafts; Curtis direct-coupled turbines 20,000 SHP in Sverige; 12 Yarrow-type coal-fired boilers
- 2 shafts; Westinghouse geared turbines manufactured by Motala Company in Gustaf V and Drottning Victoria 22,000 SHP; 12 Yarrow-type coal-fired boilers
- All ships were upgraded to oil-fired boilers in the 1930s (In Gustaf V and Drottning Victoria it was, however, for strategic reasons decided to keep the ability to burn coal to secure their ability to operate on alternative fuel if the Swedish oil supply was cut off)

=== Armament ===
==== As built ====
- 4 × 283 mm (11 in) 45 cal. Bofors guns (2 twin turrets), load in 17 seconds, rated as cramped, dividing partition between guns
- 8 × 152 mm (6 in) 50 cal. Bofors QF guns (1 twin turret superfiring over the forward 283 mm battery, and 6 single turrets, 3 on each beam)
- 4 × 75 mm (3 in) Bofors AA cannons mounted forward of the rear 283 mm battery
- 2 × 57 mm (2.2 in) short-barreled Bofors cannons (6 pdr.)
- 9 × 6.5 mm (0.26 in) MG
- 2 × 457 mm (18.0 in) torpedo tubes

==== Modernizations ====
- The underwater torpedo tubes were removed, and the underwater torpedo room was converted into an artillery central to serve the installation of modern range finders and fire control equipment for heavy, secondary and AA-gunnery
- All small gunnery and 2 152 mm (6 in) guns were removed and replaced with modern Bofors 75mm, 40mm and 20mm anti aircraft gunnery.
- The range of the 283 mm (11 in) main artillery was upgraded by new ammunition.
- 450 complement after reconstruction

== Appearance ==
All three ships looked similar until reconstruction. Gustav V had funnels trunked into one and the upper works modified heavily. Sverige had the fore funnel trunked back away from the superstructure which was modified, and kept the second funnel, making the ships very different in appearance between the main turrets. Gustav V also had her forward superfiring twin 152 mm (6 in) turret removed, and replaced with a platform for gyro-stabilized AA artillery ( 4 x 40 mm bofors) while Sverige and Drottning Victoria had their midship single 152 mm (6 in) guns removed and replaced with gyro-stabilized AA platforms (Bofors 40 mm double mountings)

== Ships ==
Three of these ships were built:

- Sverige was ordered in 1912 and completed in 1917, built by Götaverken Gothenborg. She was paid for by public subscription as the Swedish people's gift to the country.
- Drottning Victoria ("Queen Victoria") was ordered in 1915 and completed in 1921, built by Götaverken Gothenborg. She had an improved design, with an icebreaking bow and different machinery.
- Gustav V was ordered in 1915 and completed in 1922, built by Kockums shipyard in Malmö. She had the same improved design as Drottning Victoria.

A fourth ship was considered but not built due to economic difficulties.

The ships were modernised in the 1930s with oil-fired boilers replacing the old coal-fired boilers, removal of underwater torpedo equipment, new anti-aircraft guns, and new fire control equipment.

The underwater torpedo tubes that proved outdated already upon completion turned out to be a "lucky mistake". The removal of the tubes as well as torpedo storage and work areas opened up well needed spaces in the best protected areas of the ship for modern fire control systems. All ships had several upgrades of fire control systems during their lifetime both for surface-, and later centralized AA fire control.

Plans were drawn up in the 1940s to modernize Drottning Victoria by rebuilding the superstructure, increasing the elevation of the main turrets to 32 degrees, and replacing the light armament with 2 twin 57mm guns and 12 40mm/56 Bofors guns in 4 twin and 4 single mounts, as well as 10 25mm Bofors mounts. This would have more than doubled the weight of anti-aircraft fire per minute. These plans were never undertaken. The plans and an essay explaining them can be viewed in here on pages 103 to 113.

== Tactical doctrine and effectiveness ==
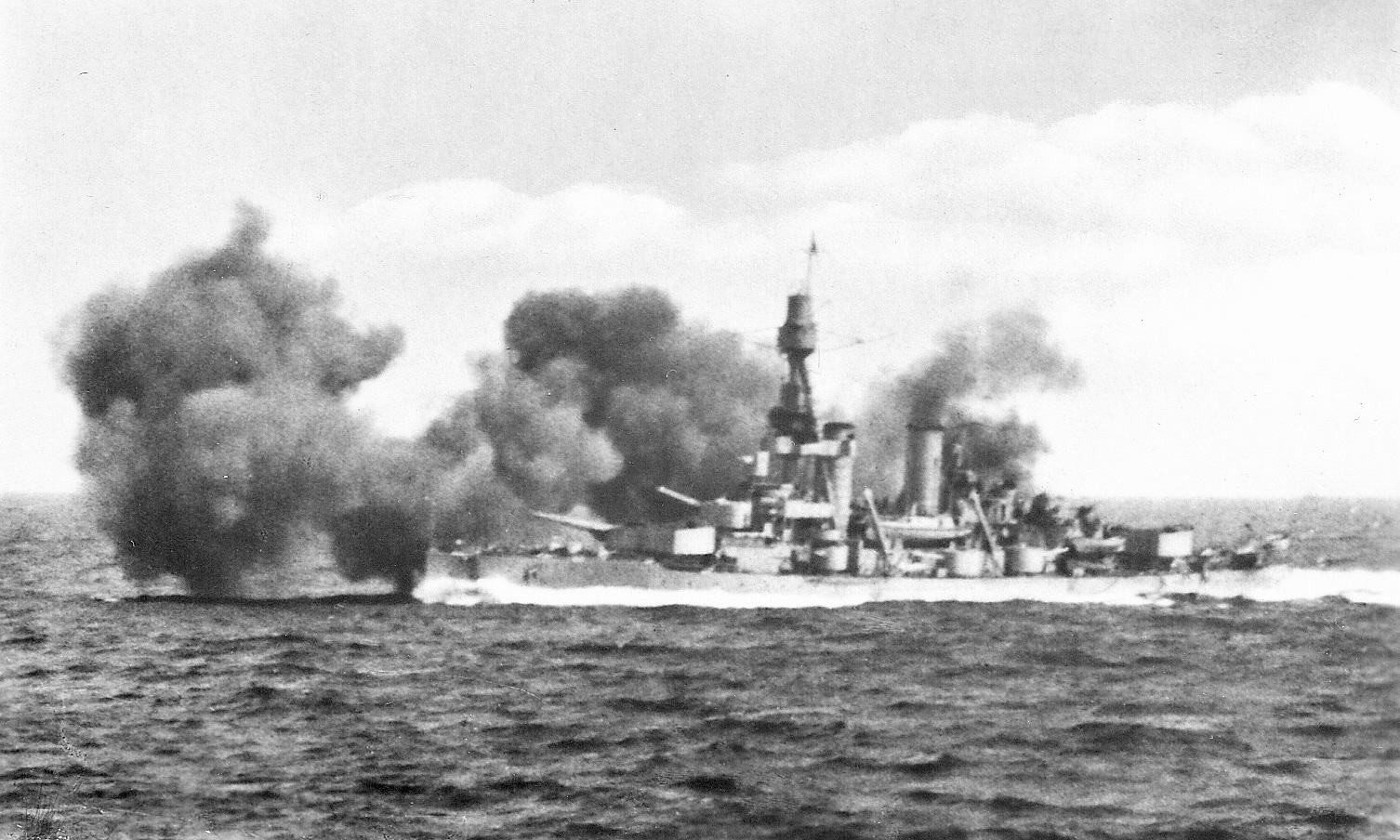
Sverige-class ship firing

The Sverige-class ships differed in several ways from the classical coastal defence ship: at first by heavier armament as well as better speed and armour, but still small enough to operate and hide in the archipelagos and shallow waters. But the main difference was to be noted in their tactical doctrine and operations. Unlike other coastal defence ships, the Sverige class formed the core of a traditional open-sea battle group (Coastal Fleet), operating with cruisers, destroyers, torpedo boats and air reconnaissance like traditional battleship tactics of the time. This "mini battle group" had no intention, nor need, to challenge the superpowers in blue sea battles, but rather to operate as defensive shield against any aggression challenging Swedish interests and territory. Based on the doctrine that one needs a battle group to challenge a battle group, the Coastal Fleet presented a considerable obstacle to anything smaller than a full-size battleship or battlecruiser, but in a tactical situation where full-size battleships would have very limited operational space exposing them to submarines, fast torpedo crafts, land based dive-bombers and minefields.
