= Bofors =

Swedish (and later British) arms manufacturer

AB Bofors
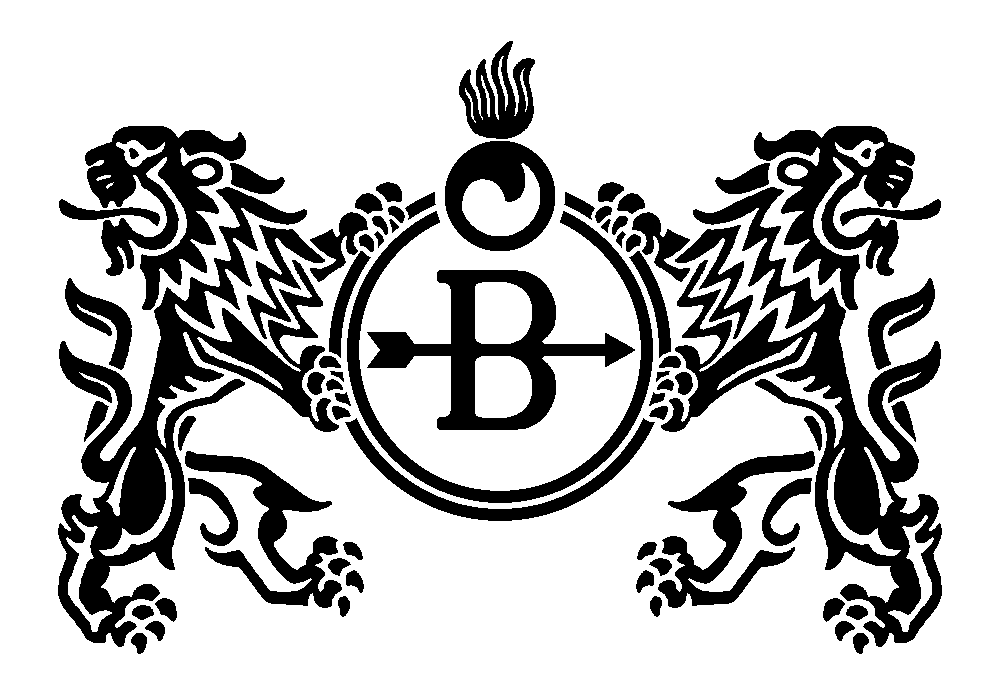
- Bofors older heraldic logotype, featuring two lions upholding two circles containing the "Bofors arrow" (B-arrow), crowned by a lit grenade
- Native name: Aktiebolaget Bofors
- Formerly: Bofors-Gullspång Company Ltd.
- Industry: Arms industry
- Founded: 1646 in Karlskoga, Sweden
- Headquarters: Karlskoga, Sweden

AB Bofors (UK: /ˈboʊfərz/ BOH-fərz, US: /ˈboʊfɔːrz/ BOH-forz, Swedish: [buːˈfɔʂː]) is a former Swedish arms manufacturer which today is part of the British arms manufacturer BAE Systems. The name has been associated with the iron industry and artillery manufacturing for more than 350 years.

== History ==
Located in Karlskoga neighborhood of Bofors, Sweden, the company originates from the hammer mill "Boofors", which was founded as a royal state-owned company in 1646 when P. L. Hosman was permitted to erect a forge at the site. Sigrid Ekehielm, also known as Boås-Beata, who lived from the 1640s to 1700, at one point owned it.

The Bofors Works was acquired by Johan Eberhard Geijer (1733–1796) in 1762. It was then acquired by the latter's brother, Emanuel af Geijerstam.

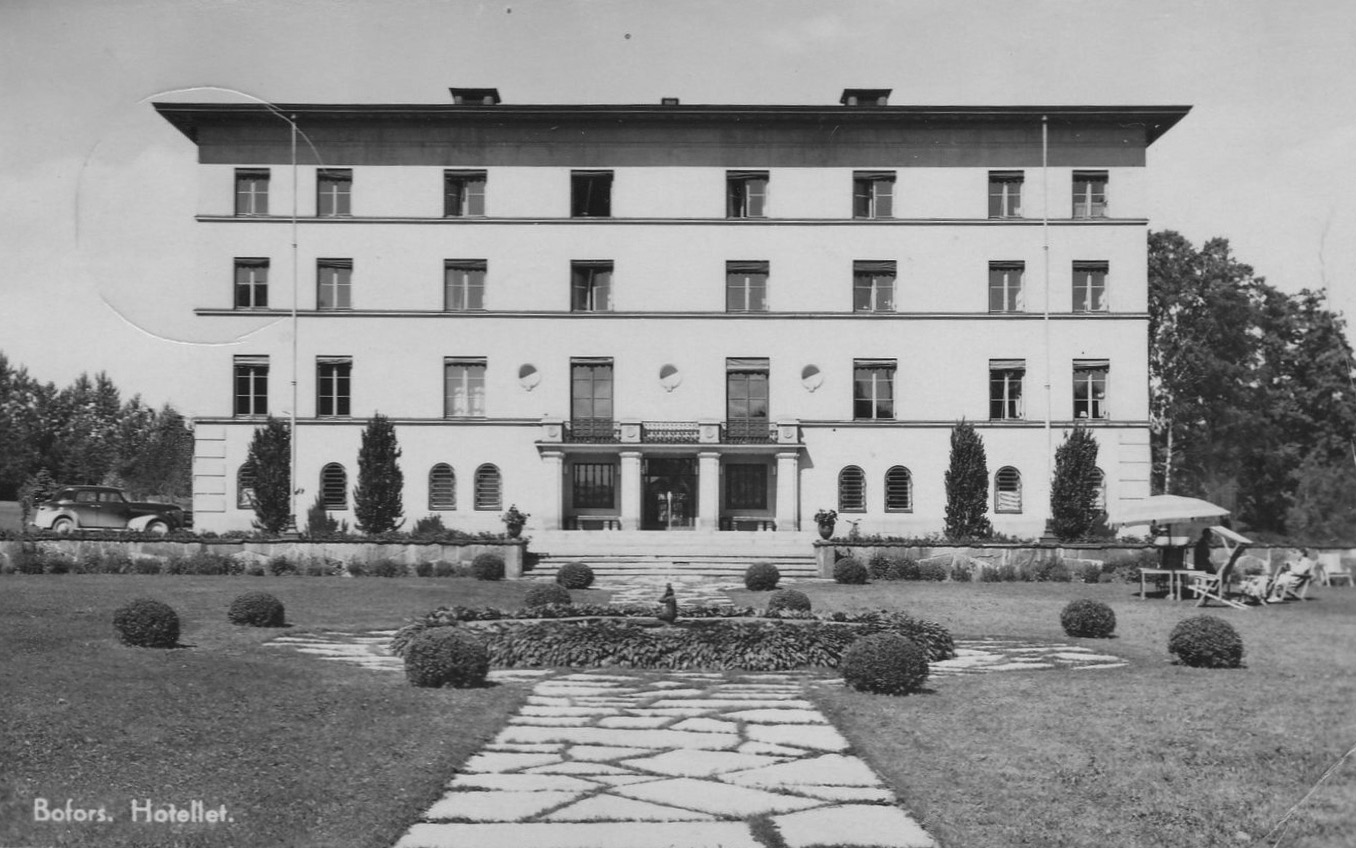
The Bofors Hotel, which was designed by Wilhelm von Eick and built in an Italianate style, was initially intended to exclusively serve the guests of Bofors.

The modern corporate structure was created in 1873 with the foundation of Aktiebolaget (AB) Bofors-Gullspång. A leading Swedish steel producer by the early 1870s, when steel began to be used for gun manufacture in Sweden, Bofors initially sold cast and forged steel produced by the Siemens-Martin process to Finspång gun works, but soon started to expand into weapons manufacture. The company's first cannon workshop was opened in 1884. Bofors' most famous owner was Alfred Nobel, who owned the company from 1894 until his death in December 1896. Nobel played a key role in reshaping the former iron and steel producer to a modern cannon manufacturer and chemical industry participant. The powder manufacturer AB Bofors Nobelkrut, later an explosives and general organic-chemical producer, was created in 1898 as a wholly owned subsidiary.

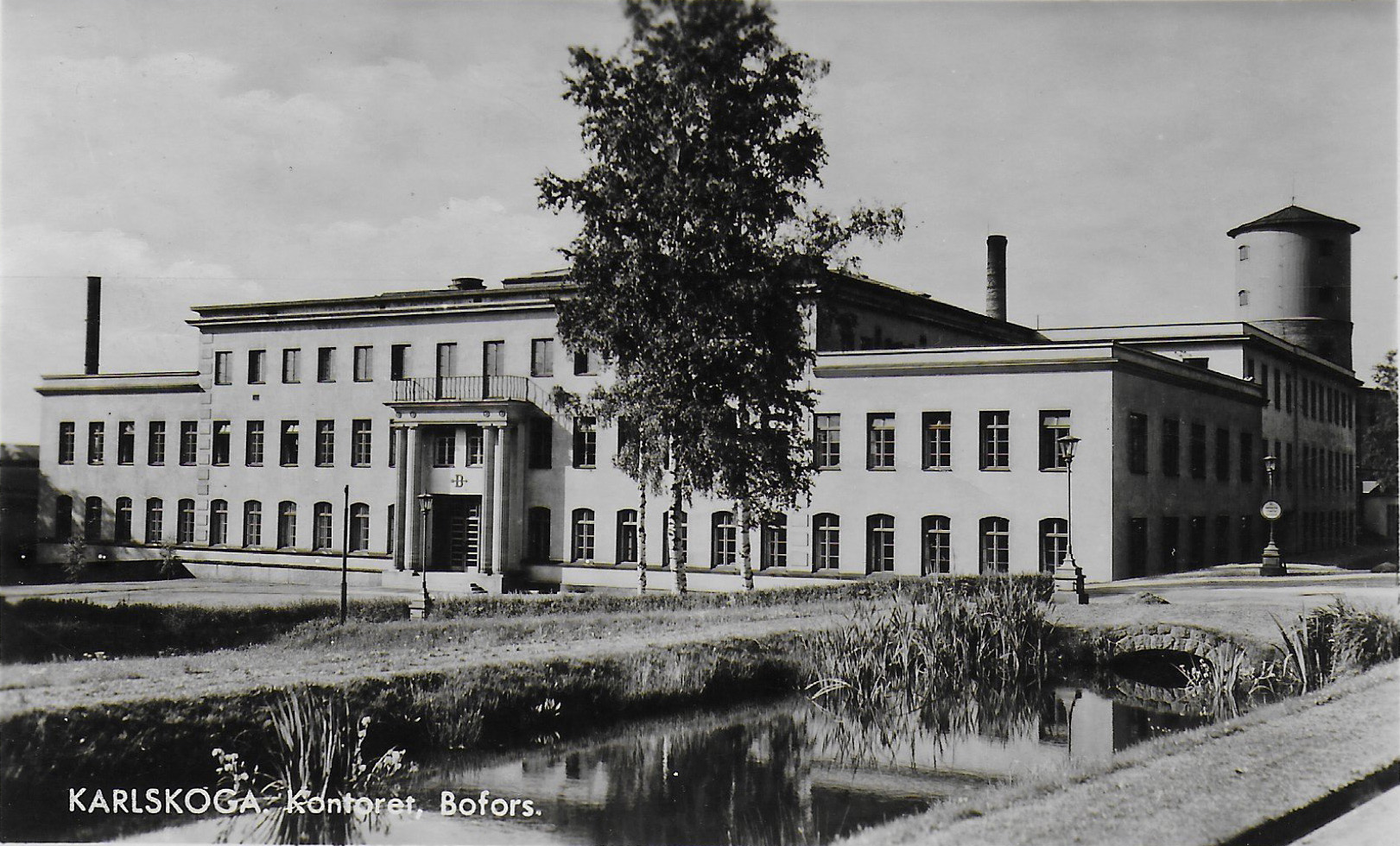
The Bofors Headquarters completed in 1930

By 1911, AB Bofors-Gullspång had outcompeted, bought and closed down its Finspång Swedish competitor in cannon manufacture. The company's name was shortened to AB Bofors in 1919.

When the Treaty of Versailles severely limited Germany from developing new artillery and banned its exports, German military companies started to offshore their R&D abroad, and Krupp, prohibited to develop guns under 17 cm in caliber, started to co-operate with Bofors already in 1919 in order to secretly engage in arms design and manufacture:

When, after the end of the war, it became a certainty that, for Krupp, gun production would come to a complete standstill, Krupp concluded an agreement with Aktiebolaget Bofors, a Swedish firm, which made available to Bofors information on Krupp's experiences relative to the production of steel in certain fields, and especially of steel for the manufacture of guns, also a license agreement on the basis of which Bofors was authorized to duplicate some types of Krupp's artillery designs, insofar as they were not classed as secret by the Reich. Krupp combined with this the intention of benefiting by the experience gathered at that end. Bofors pledged itself at Krupp's request to permit Krupp employees admission to its works at all times and to supply them with all desired information.

Bofors was also able to take over pre-war Dutch and Danish contracts of Krupp in September 1919. Under a 1921 agreement the company agreed not to export any Krupp-derived materiel to the victors of WWI: the UK, US, France, Italy and Japan. The Swedish government fully endorsed all that activity. Also, since 1920 Krupp held 31.8% of Bofors stock through its Swedish subsidiary AB Boforsintressenter despite a 1916 law prohibiting foreigners from having over 20% stock of a Swedish business. As a result of such a collaboration, Bofors prospered, and by the early 1930s it employed ~2800 people (not counting the supply subsidiaries).

After Adolf Hitler's rise to power, the German rearmament became public and increased in scale so there was no more need in using front companies abroad, hence German armaments firms returned their R&D to the home turf. The Swedish parliament also banned foreign ownership of military industries in 1935, so Krupp had to liquidate Boforsintressenter and sell off its Bofors shares to Swedish entrepreneur Axel Wenner-Gren, who long had good connections with Krupp.

Karlskoga grew around the Bofors Works, which employed almost 10,000 people by 1970. The arms industry created numerous job opportunities in the 1900s, contributing to the population boom of the city.

Throughout its history, the works has been linked to several influential Swedish families such as Robsahm, Liljeström, Flygge, and Ekehjelm.

== Present ownership ==
In 1999, Saab AB purchased the Celsius Group, the then parent company of Bofors. In September 2000, United Defense Industries (UDI) of the United States acquired Bofors Weapons Systems (the heavy weapons division), while Saab retained the missile interests.

The British company BAE Systems acquired UDI and its Bofors subsidiary in 2005, and BAE Systems Bofors is now a business unit of the Swedish subdivision BAE Systems AB, while the Swedish unit Saab Bofors Dynamics is part of Saab AB.

== Products ==
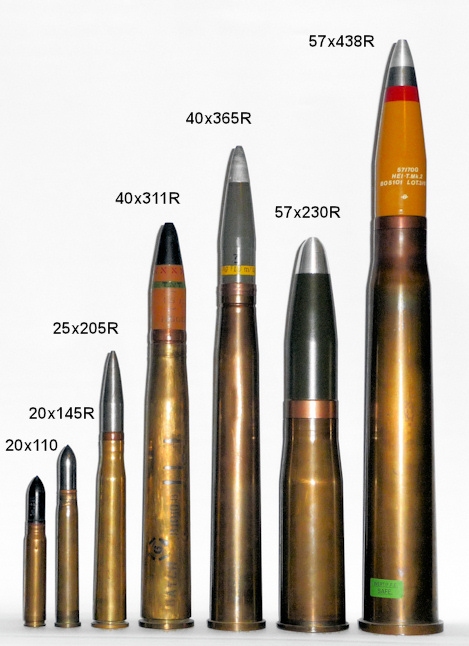
Various cannon cartridges manufactured by Bofors, including proprietary ammunition for the m/40 anti-aircraft gun (20×145mmR, second from the left), m/32 AA gun (25×205mmSR), both 40mm AA gun families (40×311mmR & 40×365mmR), m/47 aircraft gun (57×230mmR), and 57mm naval gun family (57×438mmR), respectively

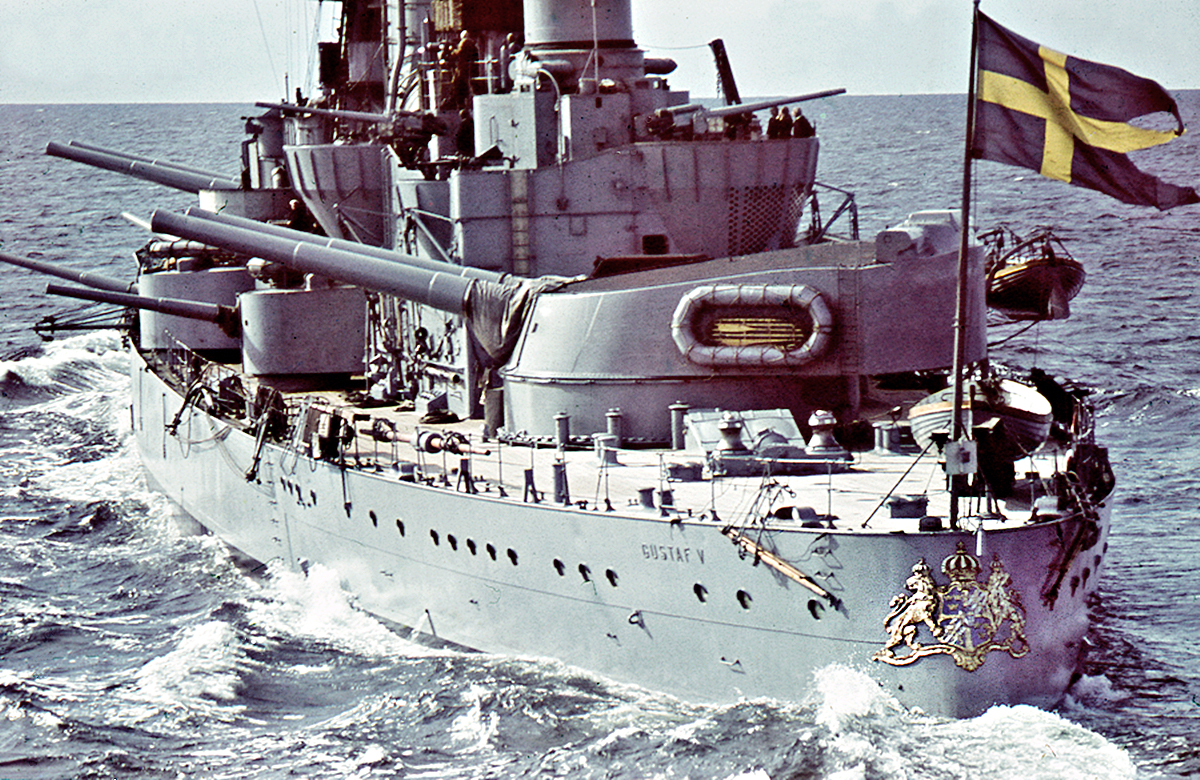
Bofors 283 mm gun on the Swedish HSwMS Gustav V

The name Bofors is strongly associated with the Bofors 40 mm L/60 gun used by both sides during World War II. This automatic cannon is often simply called the Bofors gun and saw service on both land and sea. It became so widely known that anti-aircraft guns in general were often referred to as Bofors guns. Another well-known gun made by the company was the Bofors 37 mm Anti-Tank Gun L/45, a standard anti-tank weapon used by a variety of armies from the mid 1930s throughout World War II. It was built under licence in a variety of nations such as Finland, The Netherlands and Poland and used in a variety of tanks and armored vehicles, such as the Vickers 6-ton, M39 Pantserwagen and 7TP, among others.

=== Guns ===
(incomplete list)

- Bofors 20 mm Automatic Anti-Aircraft Gun L/70
- Bofors 25 mm Automatic Gun L/64
- Bofors 37 mm Anti-Tank Gun L/45
- Bofors 40 mm Automatic Gun L/43
- Bofors 40 mm Automatic Gun L/60
- Bofors 40 mm Automatic Gun L/70
- Bofors 57 mm anti-tank gun
- Bofors 57 mm Automatic Aircraft Gun L/50
- Bofors 57 mm Naval Automatic Gun L/60
- Bofors 57 mm Naval Automatic Gun L/70
- Bofors 75 mm Model 1929
- Bofors 75 mm Model 1934
- Bofors 105 mm Coastal Automatic Gun L/54
- Bofors 120 mm Automatic Anti-Aircraft Gun L/46
- Bofors 120 mm Naval Automatic Gun L/50
- Bofors 152 mm Naval Automatic Gun L/53
- Bofors Tracked Automotive Gun 155 mm L/50
- Bofors 155 mm Field Howitzer 77 A L/38
- Bofors 155 mm Field Howitzer 77 B L/39
- Bofors 155 mm Field Howitzer 77 BW L/39 L/52 (Archer)
- Bofors 283 mm Naval Gun L/45

=== Missiles ===
(incomplete list)

- BANTAM (Bofors Anti Tank Missile)
- BILL (Bofors Infantry Light and Lethal anti-tank missile)
- RBS 23
- RBS 70

=== Other weapons ===
(incomplete list)

- Bofors 375 mm multi-barrel ASW rocket launcher
- Bofors HPM Blackout high-powered microwave weapon system

== Scandal in India ==
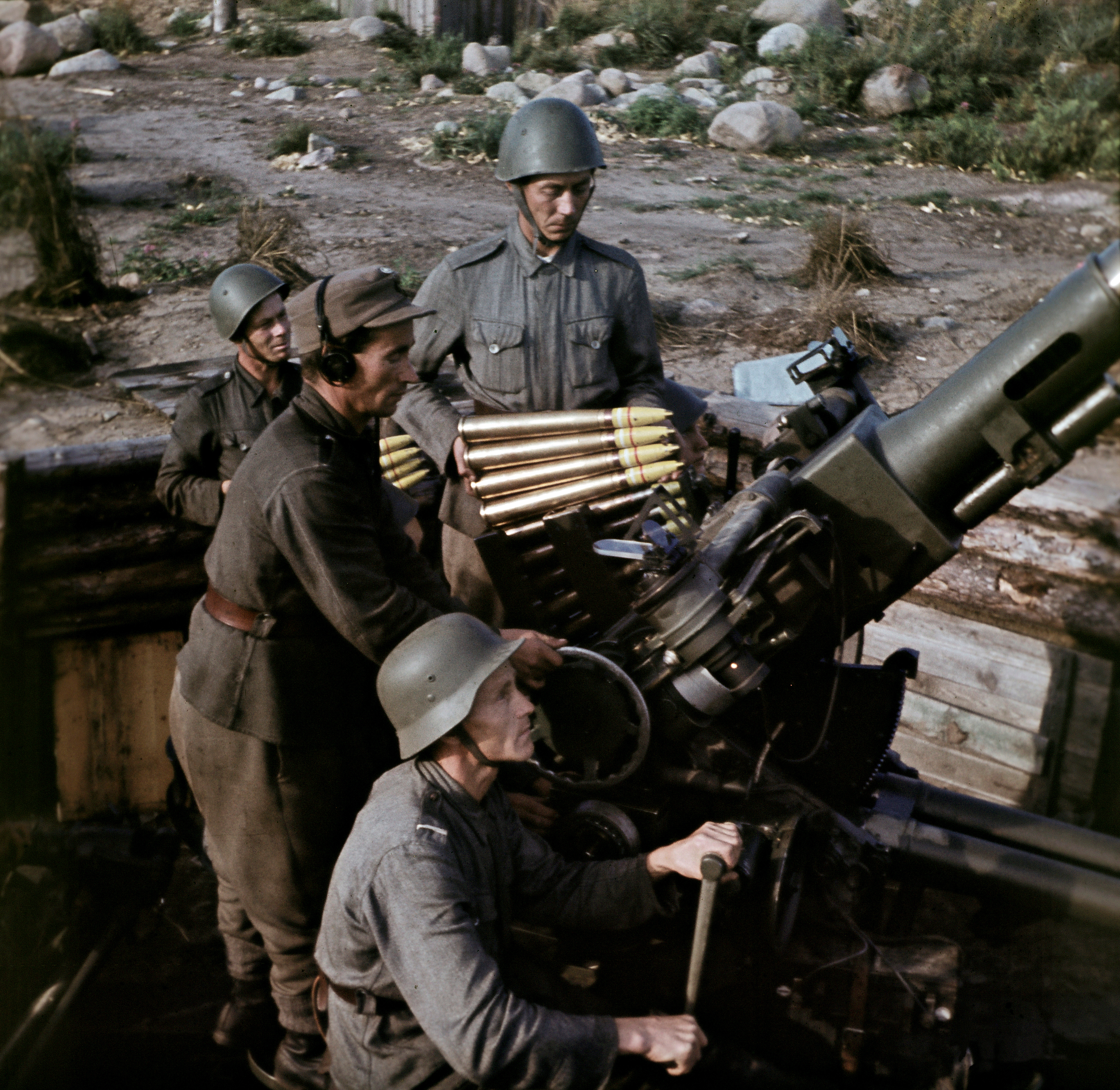
Finnish soldiers operating a Bofors gun during WWII.

In 1986, the Government of India and Bofors signed a US$285 million contract for the supply of 410 155 mm field howitzers. In 1987, Swedish Radio alleged that Bofors paid illegal commissions of ₹600 million (equivalent to ₹7.5 billion or US$79 million in 2023) to top Indian politicians, members of senior Congress party and key defence officials to seal the deal. The scandal contributed to the defeat of Rajiv Gandhi's government in the elections three years later.

== See also ==
- Bofors Hotel
- The Bofors Gun – 1968 British drama film directed by Jack Gold, based on the play "Events While Guarding the Bofors Gun" by John McGrath
- List of modern armament manufacturers
- List of oldest companies
