= Uddeholm =

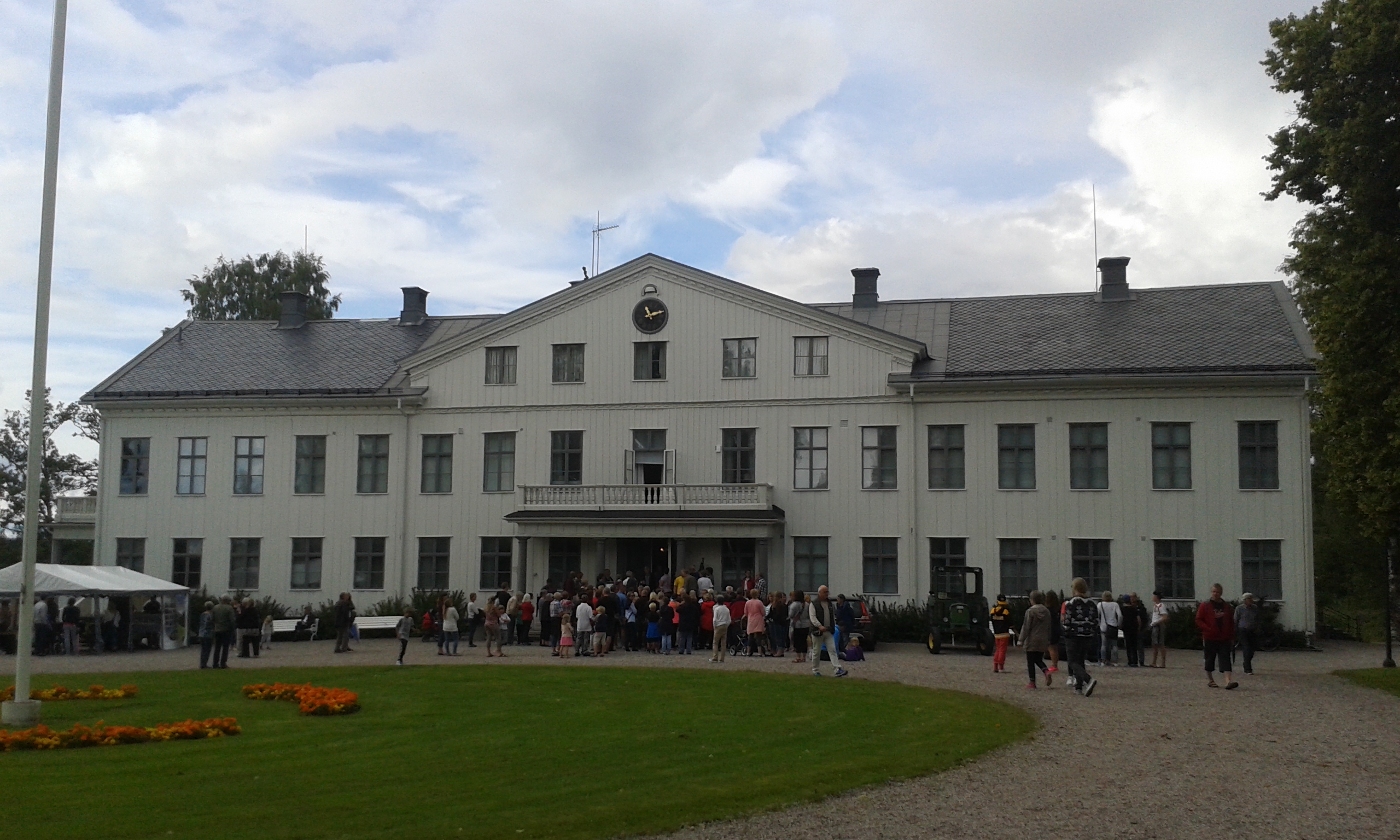
- Uddeholm mansion

- Location within Sweden
- Coordinates: 60°01′N 13°37′E
- Country: Sweden
- Province: Värmland
- County: Värmland County
- Municipality: Hagfors Municipality

Area
  - Total: 1.43 km^{2} (0.55 sq mi)

Population (31 December 2010)
  - Total: 667
  - Density: 465/km^{2} (1,200/sq mi)
- Time zone: UTC+1 (CET)
  - Summer (DST): UTC+2 (CEST)
- Climate: Dfb

Uddeholm is a locality situated in Hagfors Municipality, Värmland County, Sweden with 667 inhabitants in 2010.

The company Uddeholms AB, located in Hagfors is named after the locality.
