= Bofors 283 mm M/12 naval gun =

28 cm kanon M/12
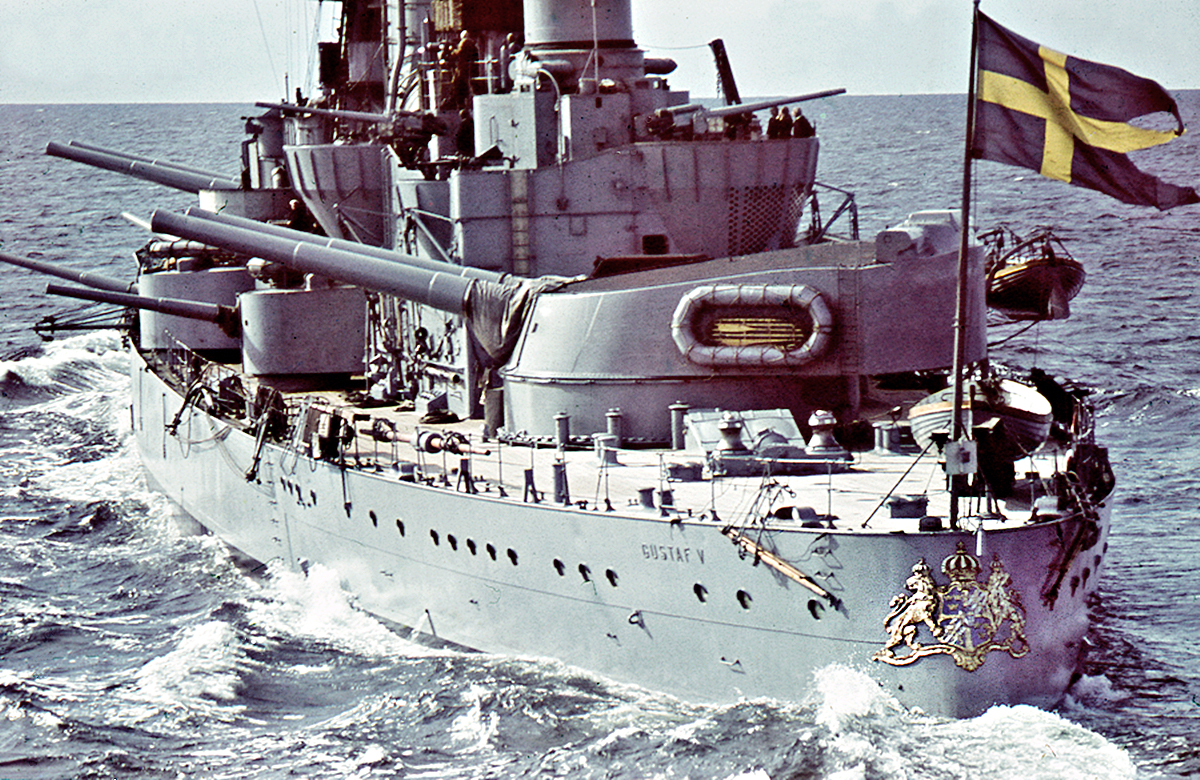
- Aft 283 mm gun turret on the coastal defence ship HSwMS Gustav V
- Type: Naval artillery
- Place of origin: Sweden

Service history
- In service: 1916–1957

Production history
- Designer: Bofors
- Designed: 1912
- Manufacturer: Bofors
- No. built: 12

Specifications
- Mass: 44.1 t (43.4 long tons; 48.6 short tons)
- Length: 12,735 mm (41 ft 9 in)
- Barrel length: 12,295 mm (40 ft 4 in) (45 caliber)
- Shell: 305 kg (672 lb)
- Caliber: 283 mm (11.1 in)
- Elevation: -10°/+20° (5°/s)
- Traverse: 150° from either side of centreline (4°/s)
- Rate of fire: 3-4 rpm
- Muzzle velocity: 860–870 m/s (2,800–2,900 ft/s)
- Maximum firing range: 19,600 m (21,400 yd) (25,000m post 1930's)

The Bofors 283 mm M/12 naval gun was a naval rifle of 283 millimetres (11.1 in) and 45 calibers used as the main battery of the Swedish Sverige-class coastal defence ships. It was designed and built by Bofors a few years before the First World War.

== Bibliography ==
- Ahlberg, Lars (1986). "Gun Data for the Swedish Sverige Class Coastal Battleships". F.P.D.S. Newsletter. XIV (3): 1.
- Campbell, John (1985). Naval Weapons of World War II. Annapolis, Maryland: Naval Institute Press. ISBN 0-87021-459-4.
- Harris, Daniel G. (1992). "The Svierge Class Coastal Defense Ships". In Gardiner, Robert (ed.). Warship 1992. London: Naval Institute Press. pp. 80–98. ISBN 0-85177-603-5.
