= List of coastal defence ships of the Swedish Navy =

Ships of the
Swedish Navy
Capital ships
Coastal defence ships
Corvettes
Cruisers
Destroyers
Frigates
Mine warfare vessels
Monitors
Patrol vessels
Gunboats
Sloops of war
Submarines
Torpedo boats

This is a list of Swedish coastal defence ships of the period 1859-1918:
They are sometimes called "coast defence battleships." They were listed in the 1938 edition of Jane's Fighting Ships as battleships, though they were not designed as such, nor capable of fighting true battleships one on one.

Svea class

- HSwMS Svea (1886) - Stricken 1945
- HSwMS Göta (1891)
- HSwMS Thule (1893)

Oden class

- HSwMS Oden (1897)
- HSwMS Niord (1899)
- HSwMS Thor (1898)

Dristigheten class

- HSwMS Dristigheten (1900) - Converted to an Aircraft Tender and Depot Ship prior to 1938

Äran class

- HSwMS Äran (1901) - Stricken 1947
- HSwMS Wasa (1901)
- HSwMS Tapperheten (1901) - BU 1952
- HSwMS Manligheten (1903)

Oscar II class

- HSwMS Oscar II (1905) - BU 1974

Sverige class

- HSwMS Sverige (1915)
- HSwMS Drottning Victoria (1917)
- HSwMS Gustav V (1918)

== Gallery ==
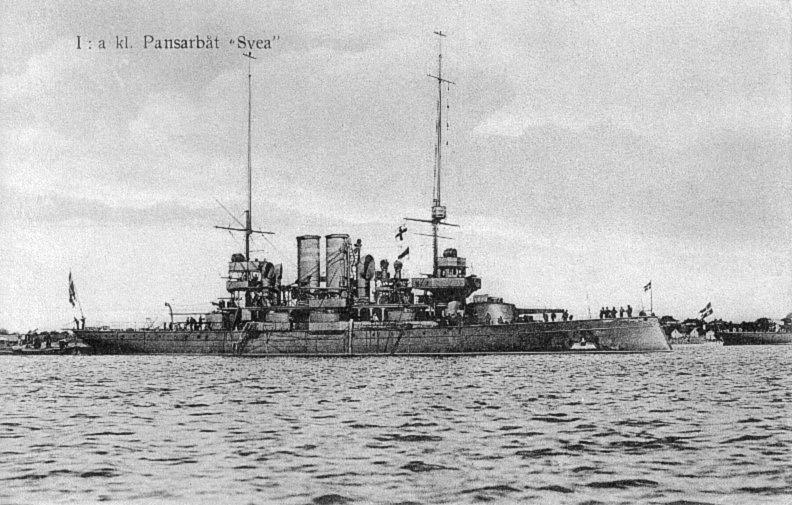
HSwMS Svea was the first Swedish coastal defence ship...

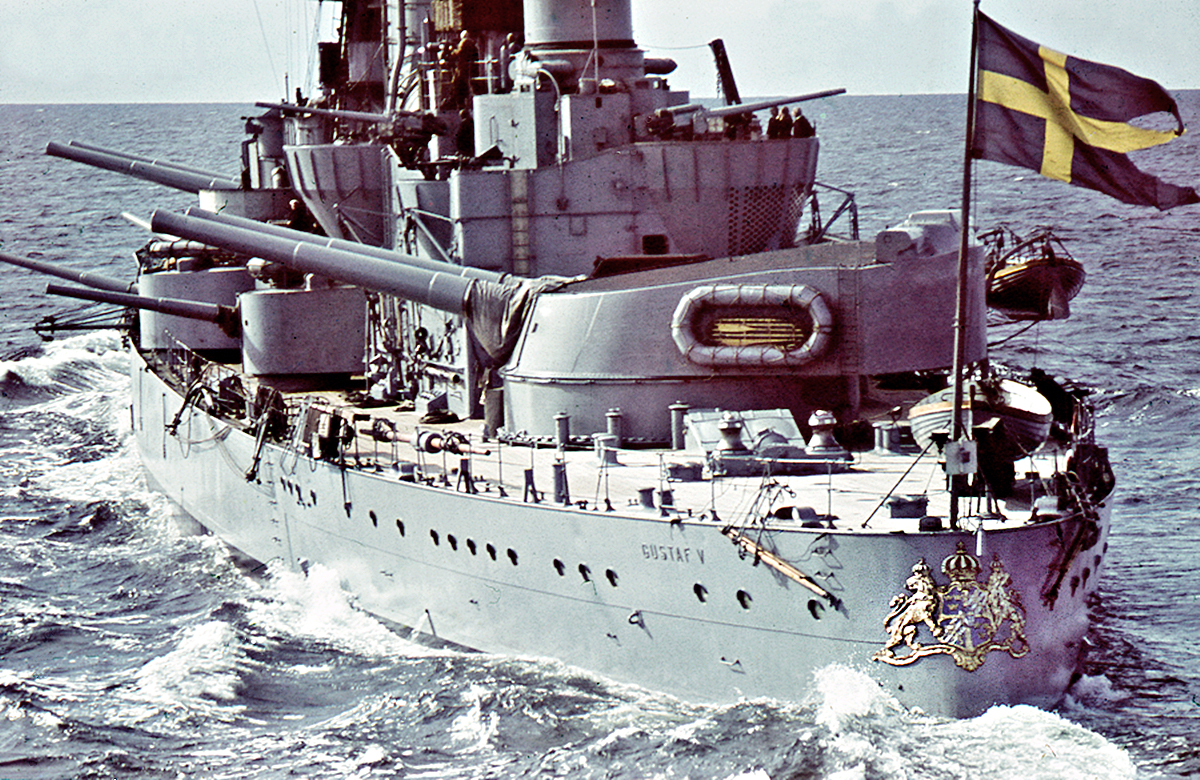
...and HSwMS Gustav V was the last one.
