= List of coastal defence ships of World War II =

Coastal defence ship is a catchall category for warships with overlapping characteristics and duties, grouped here for purposes of concision and comparison. They included ships variously called coastal defence ships, coastal battleships, German Küstenpanzerschiff, Kystforsvarsskib, Panserskip; the Dutch Kruiser, Pantserschip and Slagschip; and the Swedish 1:a klass Pansarbåt and Pansarskepp.

Coastal defence ships were cruiser-sized shallow-draft vessels capable of close to shore littoral and riverine operations. Some had limited blue-water capabilities. Coastal defence ships differed from earlier monitors by having a higher freeboard and usually both higher speed and secondary armament. Their construction and appearance was similar to miniaturized pre-dreadnought battleships. They carried heavier armour than cruisers or gunboats of equivalent size, were typically equipped with a main armament of two or four heavy and several lighter guns in turrets or casemates, and could steam at a higher speed than most monitors.

In service they were mainly used as movable coastal artillery rather than instruments of sea control or fleet engagements like the battleships operated by blue-water navies. Apart from specially built coastal defence ships, some navies used various obsolescent ships in this role. The Royal Navy deployed four Majestic-class battleships as guardships in the Humber at the start of the First World War. Similarly, the U.S. Navy redesignated the Indiana and Iowa classes as "Coast Defense Battleships" in 1919. Such ships tended to be near the end of their service lives and while generally considered no longer fit for front-line service, they were still powerful enough for defensive duties in reserve situations.

The List of ships of World War II contains major military vessels of the war, arranged alphabetically and by type. The list includes armed vessels that served during the war and in the immediate aftermath, inclusive of localized ongoing combat operations, garrison surrenders, post-surrender occupation, colony re-occupation, troop and prisoner repatriation, to the end of 1945. For smaller vessels, see also List of World War II ships of less than 1000 tons. Some uncompleted Axis ships are included, out of historic interest. Ships are designated to the country under which they operated for the longest period of the World War II, regardless of where they were built or previous service history.

List of coastal defence ships of World War II
| Ship | Operator | Class | Type | Displacement (tons) | First commissioned | Fate |
|---|---|---|---|---|---|---|
| Äran | Swedish Navy | Äran | coastal defence ship | 3,650 | 7 September 1902 | paid off 16 June 1947, scrapped 1961 |
| Drottning Victoria | Swedish Navy | Sverige | coastal defence ship | 7,125 | 12 March 1921 | paid off 22 March 1957, scrapped 1959 |
| Eidsvold | Royal Norwegian Navy | Eidsvold | coastal defence ship | 4,233 | 1 March 1901 | sunk 9 April 1940 |
| Gustaf V | Swedish Navy | Sverige | coastal defence ship | 7,125 | 12 December 1922 | paid off 22 March 1957, scrapped 1970 |
| Harald Haarfagre | Royal Norwegian Navy | Tordenskjold | coastal defence ship | 3,858 | 21 March 1898 | captured by Germany 9 April 1940, renamed Thetis by Kriegsmarine, scrapped 1948 |
| Hertog Hendrik | Royal Netherlands Navy | Koningin Regentes | coastal defence ship | 5,002 | 5 January 1904 | converted to floating battery as Batterijschip Vliereede December 1939, captured by Germany May 1940, converted to AA battery as Ariadne, returned to Netherlands post-war, stricken 1969 |
| Ilmarinen | Finnish Navy | Väinämöinen | coastal defence ship | 3,900 | 17 April 1934 | sunk 13 September 1941 |
| Independencia | Argentine Navy | Libertad | riverine battleship | 2,336 | 5 March 1892 | Stricken 1951 |
| Jacob van Heemskerck | Royal Netherlands Navy | | coastal defence ship | 4,920 | 22 April 1908 | converted to floating battery as Batterijschip IJmuiden April 1939, scuttled May 1940, raised by Germany as AA battery Undine, returned to Netherlands post-war, stricken 1974 |
| Libertad | Argentine Navy | Libertad | riverine battleship | 2,336 | 26 November 1892 | paid off 1947 |
| Manligheten | Swedish Navy | Äran | coastal defence ship | 3,650 | 3 December 1904 | paid off 1950 |
| Niels Juel | Royal Danish Navy | | coastal defence ship | 3,400 | 23 May 1923 | beached 29 August 1943, captured by Germany, sunk 3 May 1945 |
| Norge | Royal Norwegian Navy | Eidsvold | coastal defence ship | 4,230 | 7 February 1901 | sunk 9 April 1940 |
| Oscar II | Swedish Navy | Oscar II | coastal defence ship | 4,206 | 3 April 1907 | paid off 1950, scrapped 1974 |
| Peder Skram | Royal Danish Navy | Herluf Trolle | coastal defence ship | 3,494 | 24 September 1908 | scuttled 29 August 1943 |
| Soerabaja | Royal Netherlands Navy | | coastal defence ship | 6,530 | 6 October 1910 | sunk 18 February 1942, raised for Japan 1942, sunk 1943 |
| Sri Ayudhya | Royal Thai Navy | Thonburi | coastal defence ship | 2,350 | 19 July 1938 | sunk 1 July 1951 |
| Sverige | Swedish Navy | Sverige | coastal defence ship | 6,852 | 14 May 1917 | paid off 30 January 1953, scrapped 1958 |
| Tapperheten | Swedish Navy | Äran | coastal defence ship | 3,650 | April 1903 | paid off 1947, scrapped 1952 |
| Thonburi | Royal Thai Navy | Thonburi | coastal defence ship | 2,265 | 31 January 1938 | wrecked 17 January 1941, refitted, struck 19 June 1959 |
| Tordenskjold | Royal Norwegian Navy | Tordenskjold | coastal defence ship | 3,858 | 21 March 1898 | captured by Germany 9 April 1940, renamed Nymphe by Kriegsmarine, scrapped 1948 |
| Väinämöinen | Finnish Navy | Väinämöinen | coastal defence ship | 3,900 | 29 April 1932 | to Soviet Union 29 May 1947, scrapped 1968 |
| Wasa | Swedish Navy | Äran | coastal defence ship | 3,650 | 6 December 1902 | paid off 1940, scrapped 1961 |
