= HSwMS Tapperheten =

HSwMS Tapperheten is the name of the following ships of the Swedish Navy:

- HSwMS Tapperheten (1785), a ship of the line
- HSwMS Tapperheten (1901), an Äran-class coastal defence ship
