= List of ship commissionings in 1902 =

The list of ship commissionings in 1902 includes a chronological list of all ships commissioned in 1902.

Date	Operator	Ship	Flag	Class and type	Pennant	Other notes
4 February	Royal Navy	Irresistible		Formidable-class battleship		
4 February	Imperial German Navy	Kaiser Karl der Grosse		Kaiser Friedrich III-class battleship		
1 March	Imperial Japanese Navy	Mikasa		Pre-dreadnought battleship		
11 March	Imperial German Navy	Prinz Heinrich		Armored cruiser		
18 March	Royal Navy	Bulwark		London-class battleship		
8 April	Royal Navy	Vengeance		Canopus-class battleship		
14 April	French Navy	Iéna		Pre-dreadnought battleship		
31 May	Spanish Navy	Extremadura		Protected cruiser		
7 June	Royal Navy	London		London-class battleship		
1 September	Spanish Navy	Cardenal Cisneros		Princesa de Asturias-class armored cruiser		
7 September	Swedish Navy	Äran		Äran-class coastal defence ship		
1 October	Imperial German Navy	Wettin		Wittelsbach-class battleship		
15 October	Imperial German Navy	Wittelsbach		Wittelsbach-class battleship		
25 October	Imperial German Navy	Zähringen		Wittelsbach-class battleship		
12 November	Royal Navy	Venerable		London-class battleship		
6 December	Swedish Navy	Wasa		Äran-class coastal defence ship		
29 December	United States Navy	Maine		Maine-class battleship	BB-10	
31 December	Austro-Hungarian Navy	Habsburg		Habsburg-class battleship		
