= HSwMS Äran =

Swedish coastal defence ship

Coordinates: 56°44′34″N 12°19′38″E

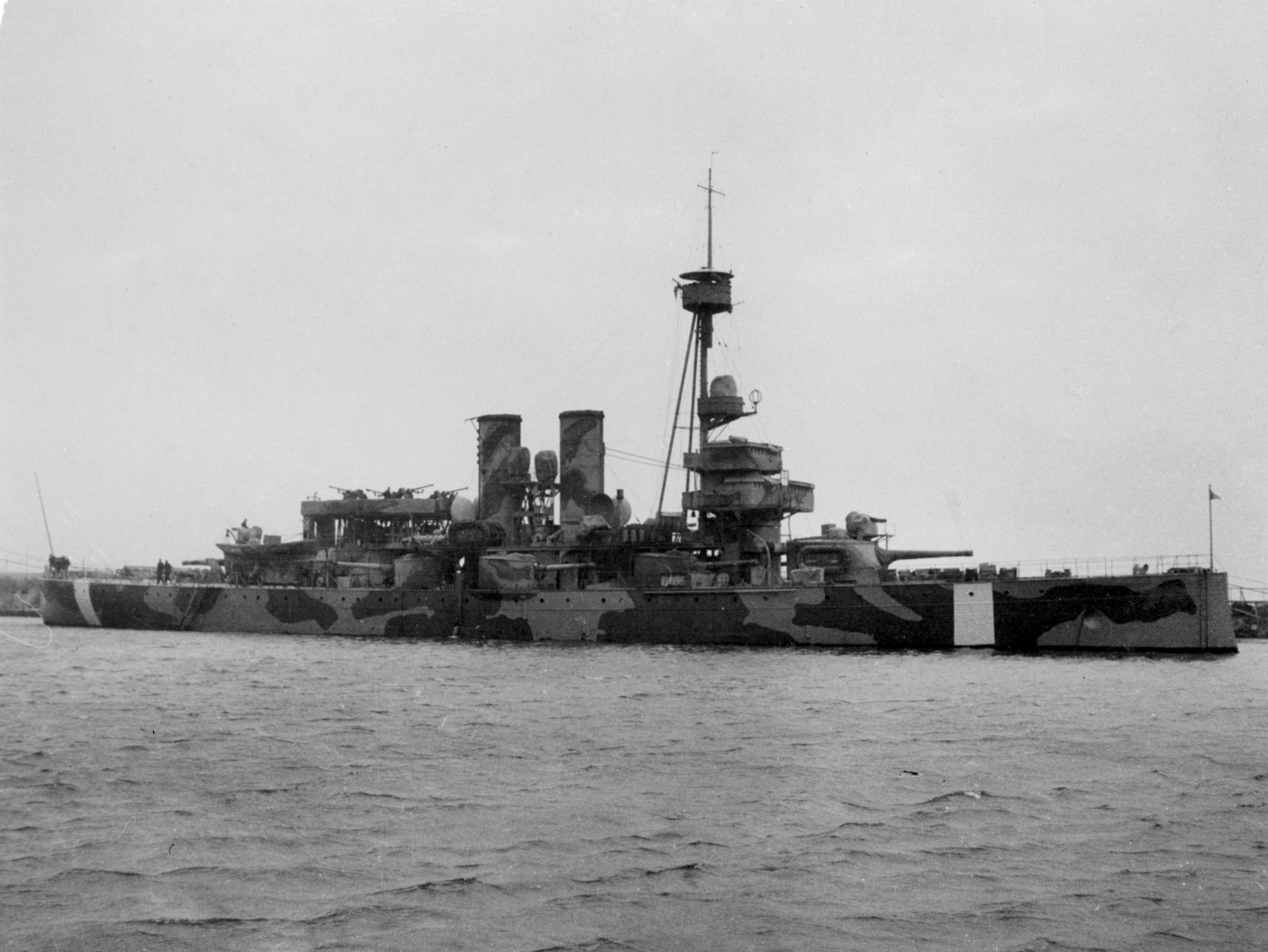
- Äran in 1944

History

Sweden
- Name: Äran
- Builder: Lindholmens shipyard, Gothenburg
- Laid down: 1899
- Launched: 14 August 1901
- Commissioned: 7 September 1902
- Decommissioned: 13 June 1947
- Fate: Sold to be broken up, 1951

General characteristics
- Displacement: 3,840 t (3,780 long tons) (normal)
- Length: 87.5 m (287 ft 1 in) (w.l.)
- Beam: 15.02 m (49 ft 3 in)
- Draught: 5.3 m (17 ft 5 in) (max)
- Installed power: 8 Yarrow boilers; 5,500 shp (4,100 kW)
- Propulsion: 2 × triple-expansion steam engines; 2 × screws
- Speed: 17 knots (31 km/h; 20 mph)
- Range: 2,000 nmi (3,700 km; 2,300 mi) at 10 knots (19 km/h; 12 mph)
- Complement: 285
- Armament: 2 × single 21 cm (8.3 in) guns; 6 × single 15 cm (5.9 in) guns; 8 × single 5.7 cm (2.2 in) guns; 2 × single 45.7 cm (18 in) torpedo tubes
- Armour: Belt: 175 mm (6.9 in); Barbette: 190 mm (7.5 in); Turrets: 48 to 125 mm (1.9 to 4.9 in); Deck: 51 mm (2 in); Conning tower: 175 mm (6.9 in)

HSwMS Äran (Note: "HSwMS" here stands for "Hans/Hennes Majestäts Skepp") (Swedish language: "Honour") was a Swedish first class coastal defence ship (Pansarskepp). A development of Dristigheten, the Äran class mounted the same 21 cm (8.3 in) main guns, but differed in the layout of the secondary armament. The vessel was launched in 1901 by Gustaf V breaking a bottle of champagne on her bow, the last time that ceremony took place following complaints that breaking wine on a ship was sacrilegious. The warship served on neutrality patrols in the First World War and was damaged after running aground in 1932. In the period immediately before the Second World War, the ship's armament was deemed out of date, and in 1939 and 1940 significant improvement to the vessel's anti-aircraft capability were made with the addition of 25 mm (1 in), 40 mm (1.6 in) and 57 mm (2.2 in) guns. After the war, the Swedish Navy decided to retire all its coastal defence ships. Äran was retired in 1947 and sold to be broken up in 1951, the last sections of the ship finally sinking in 1968.

== Design and development ==
Between 1880 and 1905 the Swedish Navy launched 12 coastal defence ships, to counter the Imperial Russian Navy. The Äran-class coastal defence ship was a development of Dristigheten retaining the same main armament but with the secondary armament mounted in turrets to improve protection and angles of fire. Äran was the lead of the class. Originally designated armoured boats (pansarbaater) in Swedish, the vessels were reclassified as armoured ships (pansarskepper) in the 1920s.

Äran had an overall length of 89.7 m (294 ft 3 in) and measured 87.5 m (287 ft 1 in) at the waterline, a beam of 15.02 m (49 ft 3 in) and a maximum draught of 5.3 m (17 ft 5 in). Normal displacement was 3,840 long tons (3,900 t) although, in 1912, displacement was reported as 3,612 long tons (3,670 t). Eight Yarrow boilers fed steam to two sets of triple-expansion steam engines provided by Motała AB and rated at 5,500 shaft horsepower (4,100 kW) driving two shafts, giving a design speed of 17 knots (31 km/h; 20 mph). Two funnels were fitted. A full load of 300 long tons (300 t) of coal was carried, which gave a design range of 2,000 nautical miles (3,700 km; 2,300 mi) at 10 knots (19 km/h; 12 mph). During sea trials, on 21 August 1902, the vessel achieved 16.87 knots (31.24 km/h; 19.41 mph) at 5,913 shaft horsepower (4,409 kW). The ship had a complement of 285 officers and ratings, later expanded to 301.

Armament consisted of two single Bofors 21 cm (8.3 in) guns mounted in turrets on the ship's centreline, one fore and the other aft. Each of the guns weighed 10.90 tonnes (10.73 long tons) and could fire a 125 kg (276 lb) shell at a muzzle velocity of 750 m/s (2,500 ft/s). The mounting, designated M1894, used electric training and manual elevation. Secondary armament consisted of six Bofors 15 cm (5.9 in) guns mounted singularly in turrets amidships. These guns, which had an actual calibre of 15.24 cm (6 in) and weighed 7,630 kg (16,820 lb), could fire a 43.4 kg (96 lb) shell at a muzzle velocity of 750 m/s (2,500 ft/s). The M1899 mounting was manually trained and elevated. The ship was also armed with a tertiary armament of eight single Bofors 5.7 cm (2.2 in) guns distributed around the superstructure and two submerged Elswick torpedo tubes for 45.7 cm (18 in) torpedoes.

Armour included a 50.43 m (165 ft 5 in)-long armoured belt that was 175 mm (6.9 in) thick amidships. It consisted of surface-hardened Krupp armour backed by 100 mm (3.9 in) of teak. The main armament was protected by barbettes were 190 mm (7.5 in) thick and turrets having an armoured face 190 mm (7.5 in) thick and the remainder 140 mm (5.5 in) thick. The secondary armament sat on barbettes protected by 100 mm (3.9 in) nickel-steel armour, the turrets having a face 125 mm (4.9 in) thick, sides 60 mm (2.4 in) thick and a roof 48 mm (1.9 in) thick. The conning tower was protected by 175 mm (6.9 in) armour. Flat to the belt was deck armour that was 51 mm (2 in) thick. Four 90 cm (35 in) searchlights were carried. A 2 m (6 ft 7 in) rangefinder was fitted in 1906.

== Construction and career ==
Äran was ordered from the Lindholmens shipyard in Gothenburg, on 12 October 1898 at a cost of SEK 2,698,000. The ship was the second of the name, which can be translated "honour", in service with the navy. Laid down in 1899, the ship was launched on 14 August 1901 and completed on 7 September 1902. Delivery had been delayed by three months because, on 23 January 1900, it had been decided to equip the vessel as a flagship, so additional accommodation was fitted for a flag officer and the attendant staff required to serve in this role. Gustaf V launched the ship by breaking a bottle of champagne on her bow. However, complaints from a prelate that breaking wine of a ship was sacrilegious meant that this was the last time this ceremony was performed. The ship was commissioned into the coastal defence fleet based at Karlskrona.

Between 19 and 24 August 1906, the vessel joined sister ship Manligheten and other ships of the Swedish Navy to host the British Cruiser Squadron under Admiral Day Bosanquet at Gothenburg. After a refit in 1914, the ship served during the First World War protecting the nation's trade routes and shipping fleet due to Sweden's neutrality in the war. On 30 April 1932, the warship ran aground in the Stockholm Archipelago, damaging the steering gear so badly that the ship slewed 90 degrees. One of the compartments flooded, but otherwise damage was minimal and the crew managed to release the vessel without assistance. Repairs took two weeks to complete. Shortly afterwards, the rudder broke in high seas and Äran was once again repaired, this time at Hårsfjärden. The ship was decommissioned and placed in reserve in 1933.

At the cusp of the Second World War, in September 1939, the ship was recommissioned. An assessment of the weaponry found it was outdated. Particularly, it was considered that the main armament, which had a daytime range of 9,000 m (30,000 feet) but only 2,000 m (6,600 ft) at night, would be easily outranged by modern German and Soviet guns. The engines were in poor condition, with the vessel incapable of exceeding 16 knots (30 km/h; 18 mph). The anchor chain and other equipment was also tired and needing replacing. A refit was undertaken, in which the tertiary artillery was replaced by four Bofors 57 mm (2.2 in) and two Bofors 25 mm (1 in) anti-aircraft guns added. During the following year, the torpedo tubes were removed and two Bofors 40 mm (1.6 in) anti-aircraft were added. The warship joined the squadron at Åland, returning to Karskrona before long. In 1942, the ship was decommissioned, hulked and redeployed as a floating barracks. After the war, Sweden decided to retire the whole fleet of coastal defence ships. On 13 June 1947, Äran was taken out of service and, in 1951, was sold to Marinverkstaderna of Karlskrona to be broken up. The vessel was partially cut up, some of the hull being repurposed as a pontoon near Falkenberg. This sank on 1 November 1968 at a depth of 32 m (105 ft).

== Bibliography ==
- Brassey, Thomas, ed. (1912). "II List of British and Foreign Ships. Ordinance Tables". The Naval Annual 1912. Portsmouth: J. Griffin & Co.: 177–268. OCLC 1118005447.
- Campbell, N J M (1979). "Sweden". In Gardiner, Robert (ed.). Conway's All the World's Fighting Ships 1860–1905. London: Conway Maritime Press. pp. 360–363. ISBN 978-0-85177-133-5.
- Fleks, Adam (1997). Od Svea Do Drottning Victoria [From Svea to Drottning Victoria] (in Polish). Tarnowskie Góry: Okręty Wojenne. ISBN 978-8-39022-748-1. OCLC 401825394.
- Friedman, Norman (2011). Naval Weapons of World War One: Guns, Torpedoes, Mines and ASW Weapons of All Nations; An Illustrated Directory. Barnsley, UK: Seaforth Publishing. ISBN 978-1-84832-100-7.
- Gard, Bertil; Becker, William A. B (1966). "Scandinavian Coast Defense Ships: Part I – Sweden". Warship International. 3 (2): 130–139. JSTOR 44885673.
- Harris, Daniel G. (1996). "The Swedish Armoured Coastal Defence Ships". Warship (XX): 9–24.
- Holmquist, Åke (1972). Flottans beredskap 1938-1940 [Fleet Readiness 1938–1940] (in Swedish). Uddevalla: Bohusläningens AB. ISBN 978-9-13800-216-2.
- Insulander, Per; Ohlsson, Curt S (2001). Pansarskepp - Från John Ericsson till Gustav V [Armoured ships from John Ericsson to Gustav V] (in Swedish) (1:a ed.). Falkenberg: C B Marinlitteratur AB. ISBN 978-9-19731-872-3.
- Parkes, Oscar; Prendergast, Maurice (1969). Jane's Fighting Ships 1919. Newton Abbott: David & Charles. OCLC 907574860.
- Roberts, John (1985). "Sweden". In Gardiner, Robert; Gray, Randal (eds.). Conway's All the World's Fighting Ships 1906–1921. London: Conway Maritime Press. pp. 355–363. ISBN 978-0-85177-245-5.
- Westerlund, Karl-Erik (1992). Svenska Örlogsfartyg 1855–1905 [Swedish Naval Ships 1855–1905] (in Swedish). Karlskrona: Abrahamson. ISBN 978-9-18707-213-0.
