= HSwMS Manligheten =

Swedish coastal defence ship

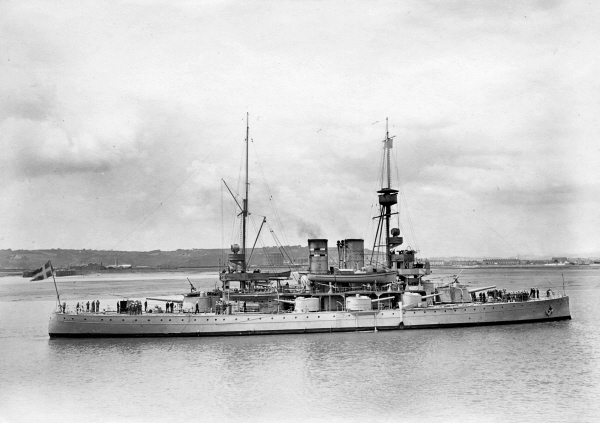
- Manligheten

History

Sweden
- Name: Manligheten
- Ordered: 22 November 1901
- Builder: Kockums, Malmö
- Cost: SEK 5,026,000
- Laid down: 3 December 1902
- Launched: 21 December 1903
- Commissioned: 3 December 1904
- Decommissioned: 24 February 1950
- Fate: Broken up

General characteristics (as built)
- Class & type: Äran-class coastal defence ship
- Displacement: 3,840 long tons (3,900 t) normal
- Length: 87.5 m (287 ft 1 in) w.l.
- Beam: 15.02 m (49 ft 3 in)
- Draught: 5.3 m (17 ft 5 in) (max)
- Installed power: 8 Yarrow boilers; 5,500 ihp (4,100 kW)
- Propulsion: 2 × triple-expansion steam engines; 2 × screws
- Speed: 17 knots (20 mph; 31 km/h)
- Range: 2,000 nmi (3,700 km) at 10 kn (19 km/h)
- Complement: 285
- Armament: 2 × single 21 cm (8.3 in) guns; 6 × single 15 cm (5.9 in) QF guns; 8 × single 5.7 cm (2.2 in) guns; 2 × single 45.7 cm (18 in) torpedo tubes
- Armour: Belt: 175 mm (6.9 in); Barbette: 190 mm (7.5 in); Turrets: 48 to 125 mm (1.9 to 4.9 in); Deck: 51 mm (2.0 in); Conning tower: 175 mm (6.9 in)

HSwMS Manligheten was a Äran-class coastal defence ship that served with the Swedish Navy. A development of Dristigheten, the Äran class mounted the same 21 cm (8 in) main guns, but differed in the layout of the secondary armament. The vessel was launched in 1903 and served on neutrality patrols in the First World War. During the two decades following the conflict, the ship undertook a number of international tours that called at ports in Britain, the Netherlands and Spain. Manligheten ran aground in 1930 and was freed by an ingenious manoeuvre by the destroyer Wachtmeister, which created waves by speeding past the stranded vessel. While serving in the Second World War, the vessel was damaged by a paravane in 1939 and modernised between 1940 and 1941. Decommissioned in 1950, Manligheten was broken up, although the ship's hull remaining in use as a pontoon until 1984.

== Design and development ==
Between 1880 and 1905 the Swedish Navy launched 12 coastal defence battleships, to counter the Imperial Russian Navy. The Äran-class coastal defence ship was a development of Dristigheten retaining the same main armament but with the secondary armament mounted to improve protection and angles of fire. Originally three Äran-class ships were ordered but, in 1901, additional funding for a fourth was agreed. Manligheten was the last of the class to be laid down, and the second from Kockums of Malmö. Originally designated armoured boats (pansarbaater) in Swedish, the vessels were reclassified as armoured ships (pansarskepper) in the 1920s.

Manligheten had an overall length of 89.7 m (294 ft 3 in) and 87.5 m (287 ft 1 in) at the waterline, a beam of 15.02 m (49 ft 3 in) and a maximum draught 5.3 m (17 ft 5 in). Normal displacement was 3,840 long tons (3,900 t) although, in 1912, displacement was reported as 3,612 long tons (3,670 t). Eight Yarrow boilers fed steam to two sets of triple expansion steam engines rated at 5,500 indicated horsepower (4,100 kW) driving two screws, giving a design speed of 17 knots (31 km/h; 20 mph). Two funnels were fitted. A full load of 300 long tons (300 t) of coal was carried, which gave a design range of 2,000 nautical miles (3,700 km; 2,300 mi) at 10 knots (19 km/h; 12 mph). The ship had a complement of 285 officers and ratings.

Armament consisted of two single Bofors 21 cm (8.3 in) guns mounted in turrets on the ship's centreline, one fore and the other aft. Each of the guns weighed 10.9 tonnes (10.73 long tons) and could fire a 125 kg (276 lb) shell at a muzzle velocity of 750 m/s (2,500 ft/s). The mounting, designated M1894, used electric training and manual elevation. Secondary armament consisted of six Bofors 15 cm (5.9 in) guns mounted singularly in turrets amidships. These guns, which had an actual calibre of 15.24 cm (6 in) and weighed 7,630 kg (16,820 lb), could fire a 43.4 kg (96 lb) shell at a muzzle velocity of 750 m/s (2,500 ft/s). The M1899 mounting was manually trained and elevated. The guns were upgraded to M1899B mounts with additional elevation for anti-aircraft warfare in 1916. The ship was also armed with eight single Bofors 5.7 cm (2.2 in) guns distributed around the superstructure and two submerged Elswick torpedo tubes for 45.7 cm (18 in) torpedoes.

Armour included an armoured belt that was 50.43 m (165 ft 5 in) long and 175 mm (6.9 in) thick amidships. It consisted of surface-hardened Krupp armour backed by 100 mm (3.9 in) of teak. The main armament was protected by barbettes 190 mm (7.5 in) thick and turrets that had an armoured face 190 mm (7.5 in) thick and were otherwise armoured 140 mm (5.5 in) thick. The secondary armament sat on barbettes protected by 100 mm (3.9 in) nickel-steel armour, the turrets having a face 125 mm (4.9 in) thick, sides 60 mm (2.4 in) thick and a roof 48 mm (1.9 in) thick. The conning towers were protected by 175 mm (6.9 in) armour. Flat to the belt was deck armour that was 51 mm (2 in) thick. Two 90 cm (35 in) searchlights and a 2 m (6 ft 7 in) rangefinder were later fitted.

== Construction and career ==
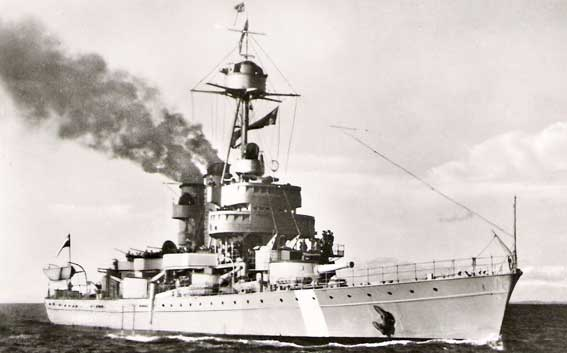
Manligheten during the Second World War

Manligheten was ordered from Kokums on 22 November 1901 at a cost of SEK 5,026,000. The vessel was the second to be named Manligheten, meaning masculinity, the first being a ship of the line constructed by the same shipyard and retired in 1864. Laid down on 21 December, the ship was launched on 1 December 1903 and commissioned on 3 December the following year. The vessel joined the coastal defence fleet based at Gothenburg.

During the dissolution of the union between Norway and Sweden in 1905, the ship served as part of the First Armoured Division under Admiral Wilhelm Dyrssen. On 24 September 1912, the crew hosted the British Second Cruiser Squadron led by the battlecruiser Indomitable. The vessel had facilities for 24 cadets added the following year. During the First World War, the warship served on patrols to protect the country's neutrality. After the war, the ship was retained in service and, in 1920, went on a visit to Amsterdam, returning with sister ship Tapperheten in May 1926 and, from there continuing to Portsmouth, Guernsey and Vlaardingen, returning to Sweden the following month. During the next year, the vessel revisited Plymouth, sailed on to Bilbao and San Sebastián, before returning to the Netherlands for a stop at Rotterdam. On 24 August 1930, Manligheten ran aground while sailing between Stockholm and Horsfjärden in poor weather. Despite efforts by the minelayer Clas Fleming and coastal battleship Drottning Victoria, the vessel could not be removed. However, the destroyer Wachtmeister, by sailing past at full speed over and over again, succeeded in freeing the battleship using successive bow waves.

In May 1937, Manligheten left on another tour, first calling at Amsterdam. The vessel then visited Newcastle upon Tyne, England, on 3 June, staying four days and then proceeded to Rouen from the 10th to the 16th of June 1937 ·. The ship went to Cardiff, Wales, for three days from 18 June and then Oban, Scotland, two days later, staying for five days. During the following October, the ship became the flagship of the reformed Gothenburg Squadron and remained in the role at the start of the Second World War. Manligheten underwent a refit on 26 August 1939, at which it was discovered that the main armament, boilers, engines and electrical equipment had all deteriorated. On 13 December, six crew were killed while trying to disarm a loose German paravane. On 9 April 1940, the ship was deployed in response to the German invasion of Norway but saw no action. This experience reinforced the need for an upgrade, so the vessel was taken out of service in December to be modernised.

The update at Götaverken was extensive. The bow was lengthened and an extension to the stern added to improve seakeeping. The boilers were replaced, the main armament was given a higher elevation and the barrels rebored, the secondary armament was replaced with four 57 mm (2.2 in) anti-aircraft guns and the torpedo tubes were removed. Additional lighter-calibre anti-aircraft weapons, a pair each of Bofors 40 mm (1.6 in) and 25 mm (1 in) guns, and a centralised fire control system were added. After the alterations, the hull was 90.2 m (296 ft) long at the waterline and displacement was increased by 35 tonnes (34 long tons). The modernised warship was recommissioned on 21 July 1941. The vessel coordinated the rescue operation for the survivors of the Swedish submarine Ulven, sunk on 14 April 1943.

After the war, Sweden decided to retire the whole fleet of coastal defence ships. Manligheten was decommissioned on 24 February 1950 and sold to be broken up to Marinverkstadema in Karlskrona for SEK 350,000. The hull was towed to Gullmarsbasen, where it acted as a pontoon until being scrapped in 1984.
