= Hugo Hammar =

Swedish businessman

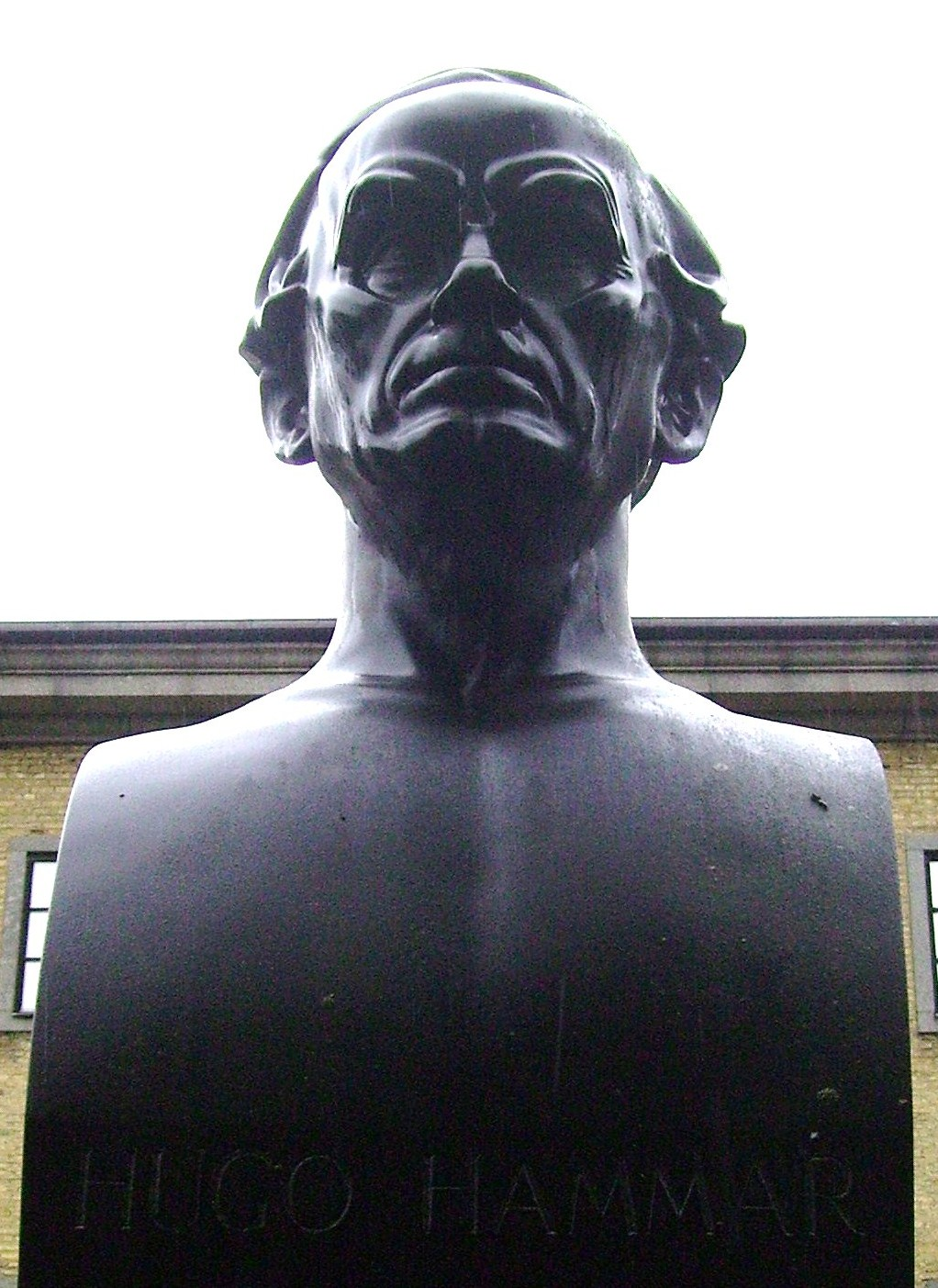
Hugo Hammar

Hugo Hammar (1864 - 1947) was a Swedish shipbuilder and businessman.
