= HSwMS Wasa =

Swedish coastal defence ship

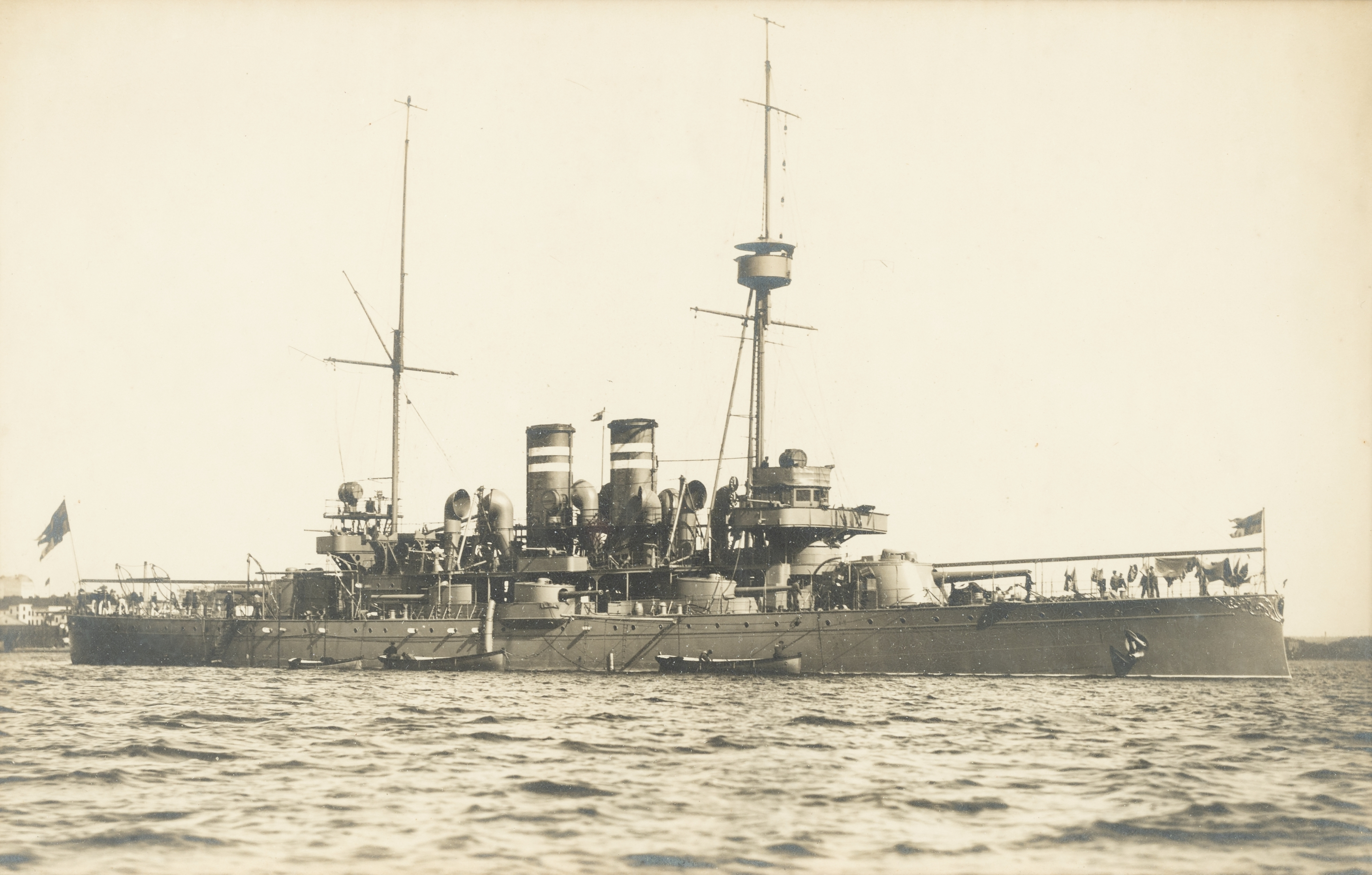
- Wasa

History

Sweden
- Name: Wasa
- Ordered: 12 October 1898
- Builder: Bergsund Finnboda, Stockholm
- Cost: SEK 2,679,000
- Launched: 29 May 1901
- Completed: 6 December 1902
- Out of service: 15 March 1940
- Fate: Sold to be broken up 9 November 1960

General characteristics
- Class & type: Äran-class coastal defence ship
- Displacement: 3,840 long tons (3,900 t) (normal)
- Length: 87.5 m (287 ft 1 in) (w.l.)
- Beam: 15.02 m (49 ft 3 in)
- Draught: 5.3 m (17 ft 5 in) (max)
- Installed power: 8 Yarrow boilers; 5,500 ihp (4,100 kW)
- Propulsion: 2 × triple-expansion steam engines; 2 × screws
- Speed: 17 knots (20 mph; 31 km/h)
- Range: 2,000 nmi (3,700 km; 2,300 mi) at 10 knots (19 km/h; 12 mph)
- Complement: 285
- Armament: 2 × single 21 cm (8.3 in) guns; 6 × single 15 cm (5.9 in) guns; 8 × single 5.7 cm (2.2 in) guns; 2 × single 45.7 cm (18 in) torpedo tubes
- Armour: Belt: 175 mm (6.9 in); Barbette: 190 mm (7.5 in); Turrets: 48 to 125 mm (1.9 to 4.9 in); Deck: 51 mm (2 in); Conning tower: 175 mm (6.9 in)

HSwMS Wasa was a Äran-class coastal defence ship that served with the Swedish Navy. The vessel served in the front line for substantially less time than the rest of the class. A development of Dristigheten, the Äran class mounted the same 21 cm (8.3 in) main guns, but differed in the layout of the secondary armament. Wasa was launched in 1901 and served as part of the coastal defence fleet, including taking part in neutrality patrols during the First World War. The ship was retired from front-line service in 1924 and withdrawn from active service in 1940, thereafter acting as a decoy and, from 1951, a damage control training ship. Wasa was sold to be broken up in 1960.

== Design and development ==
Between 1880 and 1905 the Swedish Navy launched 12 coastal defence ships to counter the Imperial Russian Navy. The Äran-class coastal defence ship was a development of Dristigheten retaining the same main armament but with the secondary armament mounted in turrets to improve protection and angles of fire. Wasa was the second of the class to be laid down. Originally designated armoured boats (pansarbaater) in Swedish, the vessels were reclassified as armoured ships (pansarskepper) in the 1920s.

Wasa had an overall length of 89.7 m (294 ft 3 in) and measured 87.5 m (287 ft 1 in) at the waterline, a beam of 15.02 m (49 ft 3 in) and a maximum draught of 5.3 m (17 ft 5 in). Normal displacement was 3,840 long tons (3,900 t) although, in 1912, displacement was reported as 3,612 long tons (3,670 t). Eight Yarrow boilers fed steam to two sets of triple-expansion steam engines rated at 5,500 indicated horsepower (4,100 kW) driving two shafts, giving a design speed of 17 knots (31 km/h; 20 mph). Two funnels were fitted. A full load of 300 long tons (300 t) of coal was carried, which gave a design range of 2,000 nautical miles (3,700 km; 2,300 mi) at 10 knots (19 km/h; 12 mph). During sea trials, the ship achieved 16.77 knots (31.06 km/h; 19.30 mph) at 5,100 shaft horsepower (3,800 kW). The ship had a complement of 285 officers and ratings, later expanded to 301.

Armament consisted of two single Bofors 21 cm (8.3 in) guns mounted in turrets on the ship's centreline, one fore and the other aft. Each of the guns weighed 10.90 tonnes (10.73 long tons) and could fire a 125 kg (276 lb) shell at a muzzle velocity of 750 m/s (2,500 ft/s). The mounting, designated M1894, used electric training and manual elevation. Secondary armament consisted of six Bofors 15 cm (5.9 in) guns mounted singularly in turrets amidships. These guns, which had an actual calibre of 15.24 cm (6 in) and weighed 7,630 kg (16,820 lb), could fire a 43.4 kg (96 lb) shell at a muzzle velocity of 750 m/s (2,500 ft/s). The M1899 mounting was manually trained and elevated. The ship was also armed with eight single Bofors 5.7 cm (2.2 in) guns distributed around the superstructure and two submerged Elswick torpedo tubes for 45.7 cm (18 in) torpedoes.

Armour included a 50.43 m (165 ft 5 in)-long armoured belt that was 175 mm (6.9 in) thick amidships. It consisted of surface-hardened Krupp armour backed by 100 mm (3.9 in) of teak. The main armament was protected by barbettes were 190 mm (7.5 in) thick and turrets having an armoured face 190 mm (7.5 in) thick and the remainder 140 mm (5.5 in) thick. The secondary armament sat on barbettes protected by 100 mm (3.9 in) nickel-steel armour, the turrets having a face 125 mm (4.9 in) thick, sides 60 mm (2.4 in) thick and a roof 48 mm (1.9 in) thick. The conning tower was protected by 175 mm (6.9 in) armour. Flat to the belt was deck armour that was 51 mm (2 in) thick. Two 90 cm (35 in) searchlights and a 2 m (6 ft 7 in) rangefinder were later fitted.

== Construction and career ==
Wasa was ordered from Bergsund on 12 October 1898 at a cost of SEK 2,679,000. The vessel was the third to be named Wasa after the House of Vasa, the first being a ship of the line launched in 1628. Laid down at the Finnboda shipyard in Stockholm, Wasa was launched on 29 May 1902 and completed on 6 December. The warship was commissioned into the coastal defence fleet based at Karlskrona.

The ship served during the First World War protecting the nation's trade routes and shipping fleet due to Sweden's neutrality in the war. In 1924, the vessel was withdrawn from front-line service, a noteworthy short life compared to the remainder of the class. On 15 March 1940, Wasa was taken out of service. The ship's armour was removed and the vessel was reconfigured to act as a double to the newer Drottning Victoria to confuse enemy reconnaissance aircraft. Some of the material removed was used in the construction of the cruisers Göta Lejon and Tre Kronor. The ship found a new role as a training vessel and, in 1952, joined the Berga Naval School to train sailors in damage control. On 9 November 1960, Wasa was sold to Marinverkstaderna to be broken up at Karlskrona.
