= HSwMS Tapperheten (1901) =

Swedish coastal defence ship

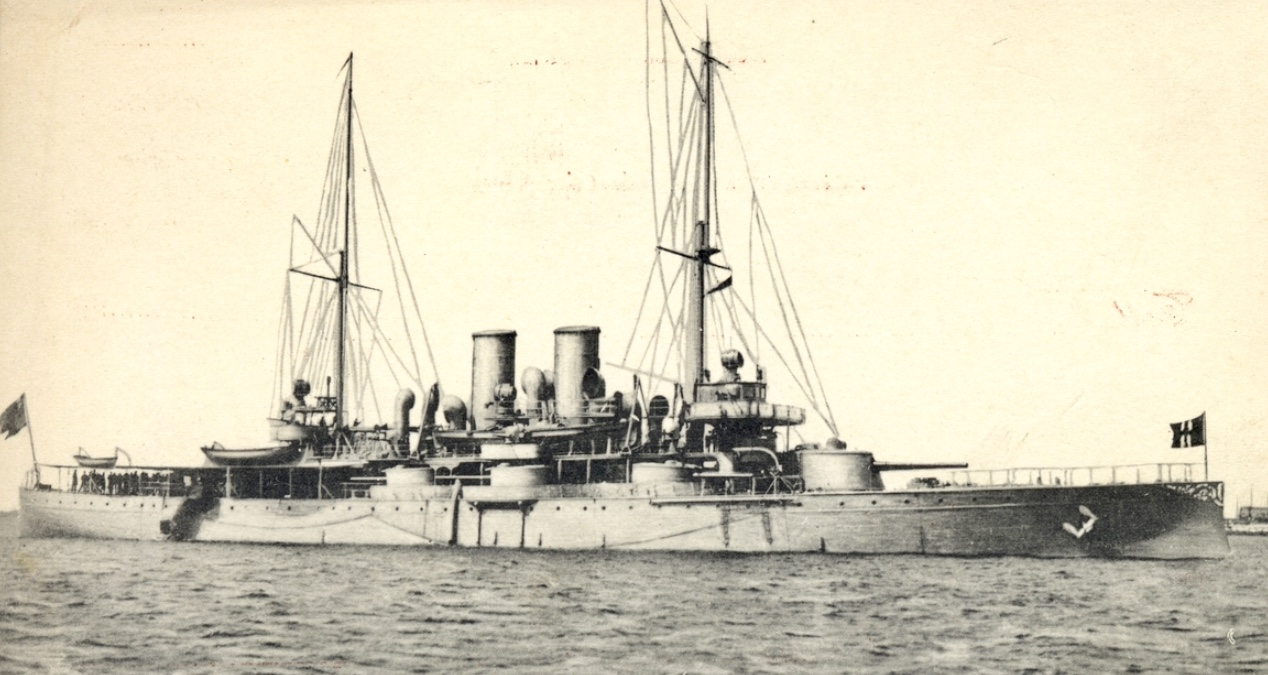
- Tapperheten

History

Sweden
- Name: Tapperheten
- Builder: Kockums, Malmö
- Cost: SEK 2,309,000
- Laid down: 12 October 1898
- Launched: 7 November 1901
- Completed: 1903
- Out of service: 13 June 1947
- Fate: Sold to be broken up in 1952
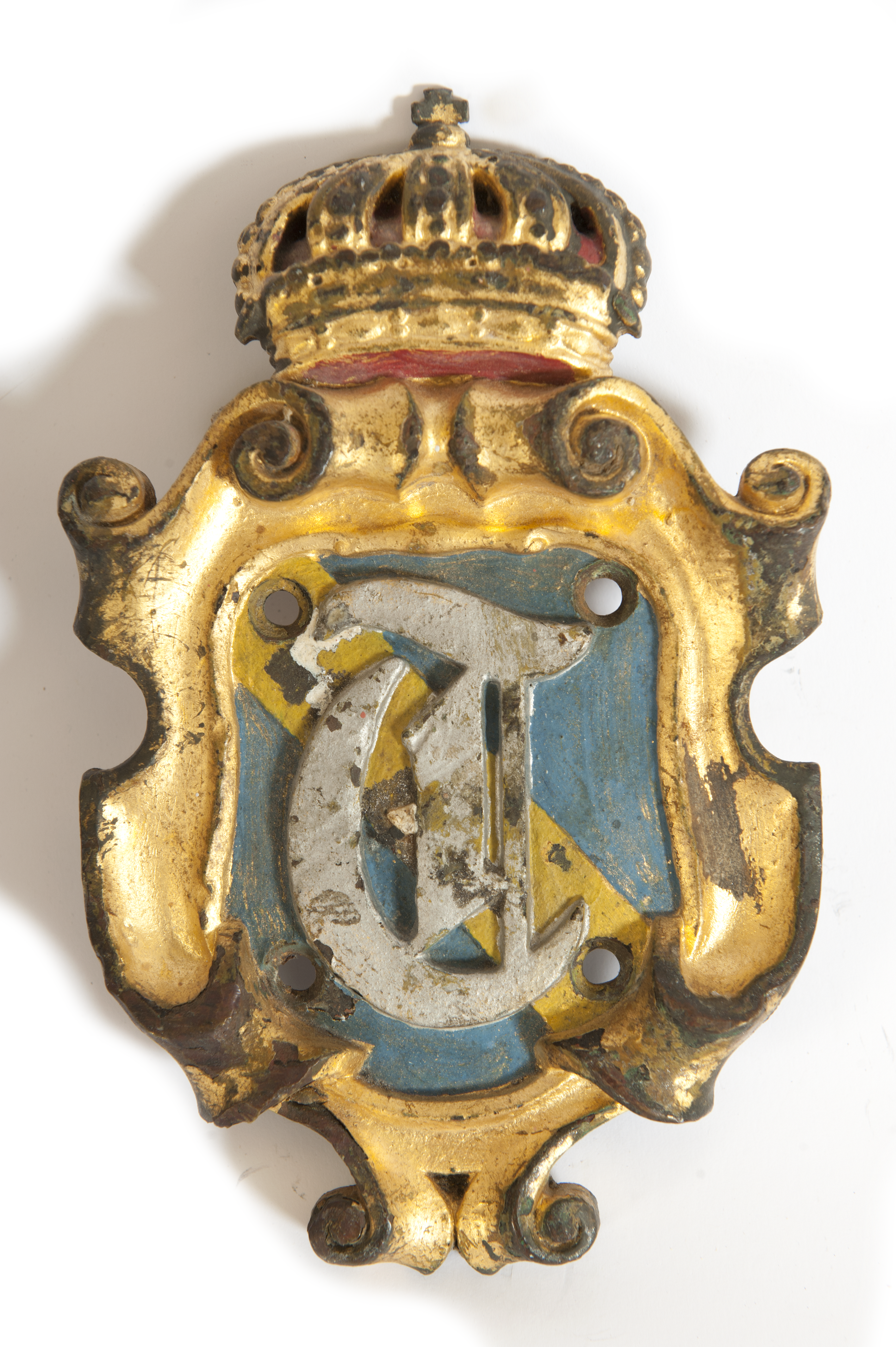
- Badge

General characteristics
- Class & type: Äran-class coastal defence ship
- Displacement: 3,840 long tons (3,900 t) normal
- Length: 87.5 m (287 ft) w.l.
- Beam: 15.02 m (49.3 ft)
- Draught: 5.3 m (17 ft) (max)
- Installed power: 8 Yarrow boilers; 5,500 shp (4,100 kW)
- Propulsion: 2 × triple-expansion steam engines; 2 × screws
- Speed: 17 knots (31 km/h; 20 mph)
- Range: 2,000 nmi (3,700 km; 2,300 mi) at 10 knots (19 km/h; 12 mph)
- Complement: 285
- Armament: 2 × single 21 cm (8.3 in) guns; 6 × single 15 cm (5.9 in) QF guns; 8 × single 5.7 cm (2.2 in) guns; 2 × single 45.7 cm (18 in) torpedo tubes
- Armour: Belt: 175 mm (6.9 in); Barbette: 190 mm (7.5 in); Turrets: 48 to 125 mm (1.9 to 4.9 in); Deck: 51 mm (2.0 in); Conning tower: 175 mm (6.9 in)

HSwMS Tapperheten was a Äran-class coastal defence ship that served with the Swedish Navy. A development of Dristigheten, the Äran class mounted the same 21 cm (8.3 in) main guns, but differed in the layout of the secondary armament. The vessel was launched in 1901 and served with the coastal defence squadron at Karlskrona. In 1907, the warship attended a naval review by Edward VII. Tapperheten ran aground off the island of Sandön in 1914, earning the nickname, Fastigheten (Permanence) due to the lack of damage received until the vessel was refloated six months later. Subsequently, the vessel served in the First World War protecting Sweden's neutrality. The warship gained a second nickname, Tappaankarheten, for losing an anchor in 1927. After an upgrade to the anti-aircraft armament, the ship also served in the Second World War before retiring in 1947 and being sold to be broken up in 1952.

== Design and development ==
Between 1880 and 1905 the Swedish Navy launched 12 coastal defence battleships, to counter the Imperial Russian Navy. The Äran-class coastal defence ship was a development of Dristigheten retaining the same main armament but with the secondary armament mounted in turrets to improve protection and angles of fire. Tapperheten was the third of the class to be laid down, and the first from Kockums of Malmö. Originally designated armoured boats (pansarbaater) in Swedish, the vessels were reclassified as armoured ships (pansarskepper) in the 1920s.

Tapperheten had an overall length of 89.7 m (294 ft) and measured 87.5 m (287 ft) at the waterline, a beam of 15.02 m (49.3 ft) and a maximum draught of 5.3 m (17 ft). Normal displacement was 3,840 long tons (3,900 t) although, in 1912, displacement was reported as 3,612 long tons (3,670 t). Eight Yarrow boilers fed steam to two sets of triple-expansion steam engines rated at 5,500 shaft horsepower (4,100 kW) driving two shafts, giving a design speed of 17 knots (31 km/h; 20 mph). Two funnels were fitted. A full load of 300 long tons (300 t) of coal was carried, which gave a design range of 2,000 nautical miles (3,700 km; 2,300 mi) at 10 knots (19 km/h; 12 mph). During sea trials, on 4 March 1903, the ship achieved 17.7 knots (32.8 km/h; 20.4 mph) at 5,888 shaft horsepower (4,391 kW). The ship had a complement of 285 officers and ratings, later expanded to 301.

Armament consisted of two single Bofors 21 cm (8.3 in) guns mounted in turrets on the ship's centreline, one fore and the other aft. Each of the guns weighed 10.90 tonnes (10.73 long tons) and could fire a 125 kg (276 lb) shell at a muzzle velocity of 750 m/s (2,500 ft/s). The mounting, designated M1894, used electric training and manual elevation. Secondary armament consisted of six Bofors 15 cm (5.9 in) guns mounted singularly in turrets amidships. These guns, which had an actual calibre of 15.24 cm (6 in) and weighed 7,630 kg (16,820 lb), could fire a 43.4 kg (96 lb) shell at a muzzle velocity of 750 m/s (2,500 ft/s). The M1899 mounting was manually trained and elevated. The ship was also armed with eight single Bofors 5.7 cm (2.2 in) guns distributed around the superstructure and two submerged Elswick torpedo tubes for 45.7 cm (18 in) torpedoes.

Armour included a 50.43 m (165 ft 5 in)-long armoured belt that was 175 mm (6.9 in) thick amidships. It consisted of surface-hardened Krupp armour backed by 100 mm (3.9 in) of teak. The main armament was protected by barbettes were 190 mm (7.5 in) thick and turrets having an armouted face 190 mm (7.5 in) thick and the remainder 140 mm (5.5 in) thick. The secondary armament sat on barbettes protected by 100 mm (3.9 in) nickel-steel armour, the turrets having a face 125 mm (4.9 in) thick, sides 60 mm (2.4 in) thick and a roof 48 mm (1.9 in) thick. The conning tower was protected by 175 mm (6.9 in) armour. Flat to the belt was deck armour that was 51 mm (2 in) thick. Two 90 cm (35 in) searchlights and a 2 m (6 ft 7 in) rangefinder were later fitted.

== Construction and career ==
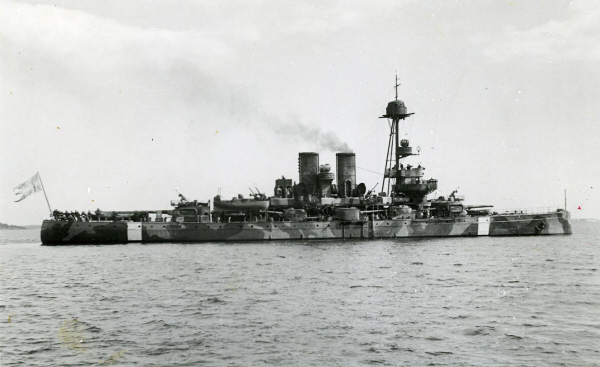
Tapperheten after 1940

Tapperheten was ordered from Kokums in October 1898 at a cost of SEK 2,390,000. The vessel was the second to be named Tapperheten, meaning courage, the first being a ship of the line launched by the same shipyard in 1785. Laid down on 12 October, the ship was launched on 7 November 1901 and completed in 1902. The ship was commissioned into the coastal defence fleet based at Karlskrona.

On 3 August 1907, the vessel joined with Oscar II and two other ships of the Swedish Navy at a naval review by Edward VII in The Solent. Four days later the ship led the squadron into Portsmouth where the sailors were hosted by staff of the Royal Naval Barracks and HMS Excellent. On 28 January 1914, Tapperheten ran aground off the coast of the island of Sandön while manoeuvring in the Stockholm Archipelago. Despite numerous attempts, it was not possible to refloat the ship until 10 July. During this time, the vessel was repeatedly battered by waves and yet stayed generally unharmed with all bulkheads remaining watertight and the hull in good condition, gaining the nickname Fastigheten, or Permanence, in the process. After a short repair, Tapperheten was recommissioned into the coastal defence fleet, the process sped up due to the ongoing First World War. The cost of the damage and repair was SEK 1,340,808. The ship served for the remainder of the conflict protect the nation's trade routes and shipping fleet due to Sweden's neutrality in the war. In 1927, the warship received a second nickname, Tappaankarheten, meaning anchor losing, in honour of the loss of an anchor in the English Channel.

At the start of the Second World War, the warship was used as a flagship. The ship's weaponry was considered outdated and so was upgraded between 1939 and 1940. The torpedo tubes were removed and four 57 mm (2.2 in) and two 25 mm (1 in) anti-aircraft guns added. The vessel was transferred to Karlskrona. On 17 September 1941, the warship was at anchor at Hårsfjärden when the destroyer Göteborg exploded in the Hårsfjärden disaster. Tapperheten was undamaged in the incident. During that year, the vessel was allocated to the squadron based at Stockholm, before returning to Karlskrona the following year. After the war, Sweden decided to retire the whole fleet of coastal defence ships. On 13 July 1947, Tapperheten was taken out of service and, in 1952, was sold to AB Vrng to be broken up at Oxelösund.
