= HSwMS Oscar II =

Swedish coastal defense ship, launched 1905

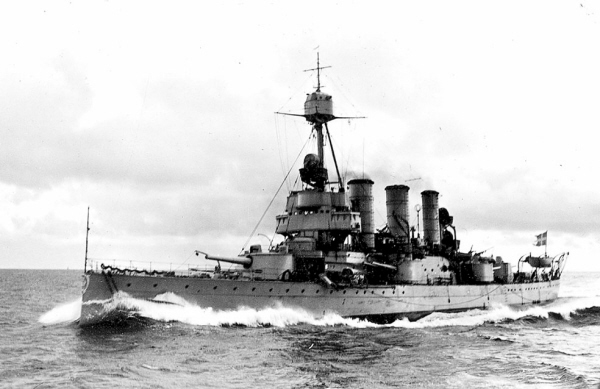
- Oscar II underway

Class overview
- Preceded by: Äran class
- Succeeded by: Sverige class
- Completed: 1

History

Sweden
- Name: Oscar II
- Namesake: Oscar II of Sweden
- Ordered: 23 September 1903
- Builder: Lindholmens Mekaniska Verkstad, Gothenburg
- Cost: SEK 3,390,000
- Launched: 10 June 1905
- Commissioned: 3 April 1907
- Decommissioned: 24 February 1950
- Fate: Scrapped, 11 September 1974

General characteristics
- Type: Coastal defence ship
- Displacement: 4,273 t (4,206 long tons) normal; 4,584 t (4,512 long tons) full load
- Length: 95.6 m (313.6 ft) (lwl)
- Beam: 15.4 m (50 ft 6 in)
- Draught: 5.49 m (18 ft 0 in)
- Installed power: 10 Yarrow boilers; 9,400 shp (7,000 kW)
- Propulsion: 2 × triple-expansion steam engines; 2 × screw propellers
- Speed: 18 knots (33.3 km/h; 20.7 mph)
- Range: 3,550 nmi (6,570 km; 4,090 mi) at 11 knots (20 km/h; 13 mph)
- Complement: 326 (335 as a flagship)
- Armament: 2 × 210 mm (8.3 in) M/98 guns; 4 × twin 152 mm (6 in) M/03 guns; 10 × 5.7 cm (2.2 in) M/89B guns; 3 × 37 mm (1.5 in) M/98B guns; 2 × 450 mm (17.7 in) torpedo tubes
- Armour: Belt: 100 to 150 mm (3.9 to 5.9 in); Barbette: 175 mm (6.9 in); Turrets: 60 to 125 mm (2.4 to 4.9 in); Deck: 22 mm (0.9 in); Forward conning tower: 157 mm (6.2 in); Aft conning tower: 100 mm (3.9 in)

HSwMS Oscar II (Note: Swedish naval vessels are prenominally HMS, which stands for His (or Her) Majesty's Ship, in Swedish Hans (Hennes) Majestäts Skepp. To avoid confusion with Royal Navy vessels that use the same designation, English speaking publications sometimes use HSwMS instead.) was a coastal defence ship or Pansarskepp ("armoured ship") of the Swedish Navy. The vessel had a long career lasting over sixty years. A development of the preceding Äran-class coastal defence ship, the ship mounted a powerful armament on a small hull, which necessitated sacrificing speed and endurance. This design decision allowed Oscar II to match the firepower of contemporary armoured cruisers while still carrying the armour of a battleship. Protected by an armoured belt that had a maximum thickness of 150 mm (5.9 in), the ship was armed with a main battery of two 210 mm (8.3 in) Bofors guns mounted separately fore and aft. Maximum speed was 18 knots (20.7 mph; 33.3 km/h).

Commissioned on 3 April 1907, Oscar II served as the flagship of the Swedish Navy, with duties including transporting Swedish King Gustav V and his consort Queen Victoria to summits with Emperors Wilhelm II of Germany and Nicholas II of Russia. During the First World War, the ship supported the Swedish invasion of Åland from February to April 1918. At the end of the conflict, the vessel was decommissioned and only returned to service in September 1929. After being modernised and serving neutral Sweden during the Second World War, the vessel was once again called upon to transport royalty, in this case bringing the body of Prince Gustaf Adolf, Duke of Västerbotten, home from Denmark after the air crash of 26 January 1947. Decommissioned on 24 February 1950, Oscar II served as a training hulk until 11 September 1974, when it became the last of several Swedish coastal defence ships to be scrapped.

== Design ==
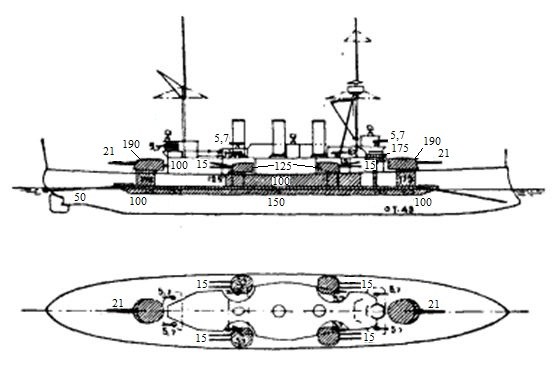
Cut-away of Oscar II

Sweden appointed a commission in 1901 to analyse the state of naval defence and see what future ships were required to meet the country's needs. The commission looked at developments in other countries, particularly the escalating Anglo-German naval arms race, and decided that instead of creating a battleship similar to those being constructed abroad, a smaller vessel that relied on speed and the ability to exploit the tactical advantages of the Swedish archipelago would be more appropriate.

The commission proposed three alternatives:

Displacement	Main armament	Speed	Cost
4,800 tonnes (4,700 long tons)	4 × 210 mm (8.3 in) guns	18 knots (33.3 km/h; 20.7 mph)	7,762,000 kr
3,950 tonnes (3,890 long tons)	2 × 210 mm guns	17 knots (31.5 km/h; 19.6 mph)	6,225,800 kr
4,218 tonnes (4,151 long tons)	2 × 210 mm guns	18 knots (33.3 km/h; 20.7 mph)	6,631,000 kr

Despite the commission's preference for the cheapest option, the Swedish Parliament (the Riksdag) voted for the third solution on the recommendation of Louis Palander, the Naval Secretary.

=== General characteristics and machinery ===
The resulting design was a modernised and slightly larger version of the Äran-class coastal defence ship. As built, Oscar II had a normal displacement of 4,273 tonnes (4,206 long tons), displacing 4,584 tonnes (4,512 long tons) at full load. The vessel had a waterline length of 95.6 m (313.6 ft), a beam of 15.4 m (50 ft 6 in) and draught of 5.49 m (18 ft). The ship was designed to have a normal complement of 326 officers and ratings. A command staff of nine officers could also be carried.

The ship was powered by a pair of four-cylinder triple expansion steam engines built by Motala Verkstad, each driving a three-bladed screw. The engines were rated at 9,400 shaft horsepower (7,000 kW). Steam was provided at 16.5 kg/cm^{2} (235 lb/sq in) by ten Yarrow water-tube marine boilers distributed in three rooms. The vessel was the only three-funnelled coastal defence ship in Swedish service. Coal capacity was 490 long tons (500 t), providing a range of 3,550 nautical miles (6,570 km; 4,090 mi) at 11 knots (20 km/h; 13 mph) and 1,100 nmi (2,000 km; 1,300 mi) at 17.8 kn (33 km/h; 20 mph). During trials, the ship averaged 18.14 kn (33.60 km/h; 20.88 mph) with coal consumption 0.95 kg/h (2.1 lb/h) per horsepower.

=== Armament and armour ===
The main battery consisted of two Bofors 210 mm (8.3 in) K/44 M98 guns mounted in single turrets fore and aft on the centreline. Designed in 1898, they were similar to the guns carried by the earlier Äran class. The guns fired 125 kg (276 lb) shells at a muzzle velocity of 750 metres per second (2,500 ft/s) and a rate of fire of two shells per minute. For secondary armament, the ship used the 152 mm (6 in) K/50 M03 gun also provided by Bofors that had previously been used on the armoured cruiser HSwMS Fylgia. These weapons could fire 45 kg (100 lb) shells at a muzzle velocity of 850 m/s (2,789 ft/s) and a rate of fire of 2.7 shells per minute. Eight were mounted in pairs in four turrets amidships, two on either side of the superstructure. These weapons were supplemented by ten 5.7 cm (2.2 in) M/89B guns manufactured by Finspång, five mounted singly on each side of the bridge. Three 37 mm (1.5 in) Bofors M/98 guns were carried ready to be mounted on the ship's boats for fire support if they were being used to transport landing parties. Two tubes for 457 mm (18 in) torpedoes were fitted below the waterline.

The armour for Oscar II was an improvement on that of the Äran class, particularly expanding the protection to lower decks. The ship was equipped with a 67 m (219 ft 10 in)-long armoured belt that was provided by Schneider-Creusot. It was 150 mm (5.9 in) thick amidships, diminishing to 125 mm (4.9 in) and finally 100 mm (3.9 in) forward and aft. Above this was a citadel which was 23 m (75 ft 6 in) long, with armour 100 mm thick and barbettes with 175 mm (6.9 in) thick armoured steel, mounted on a main deck with 22 mm (0.9 in) armoured plate mounted on 22 mm steel plate. The conning towers were also armoured, 157 mm (6.2 in) thick forward and 100 mm aft, while the bridge and upper deck had plating 10 and 57 mm (0.4 and 2.2 in) thick. The turrets had Krupp armour which was between 60 and 125 mm (2.4 and 4.9 in) thick.

The ship was first modernised in 1910 when a tripod mast was fitted, and other minor upgrades took place over the ship's life, including fitting new high angle mounts for two of the 57 mm guns for anti-aircraft defence in 1916. A more substantial upgrade took place in 1939. The boilers were replaced and the forward two fitted for oil firing. More space was made available for fire control by removing the torpedo tubes, which was used to fit a new fire-control system with a new director and sonar. At the same time, the 57 mm mounts were removed and replaced by an anti-aircraft battery provided by Bofors consisting of four 57 mm M/38 guns, two 25 mm (1 in) M/32 guns and four 8 mm (0.3 in) M/36 machine guns. Three searchlights and a paravane were also fitted for defence against mines. Normal displacement increased to 4,400 long tons (4,500 t), while full displacement was now 4,850 long tons (4,930 t).

== Service ==
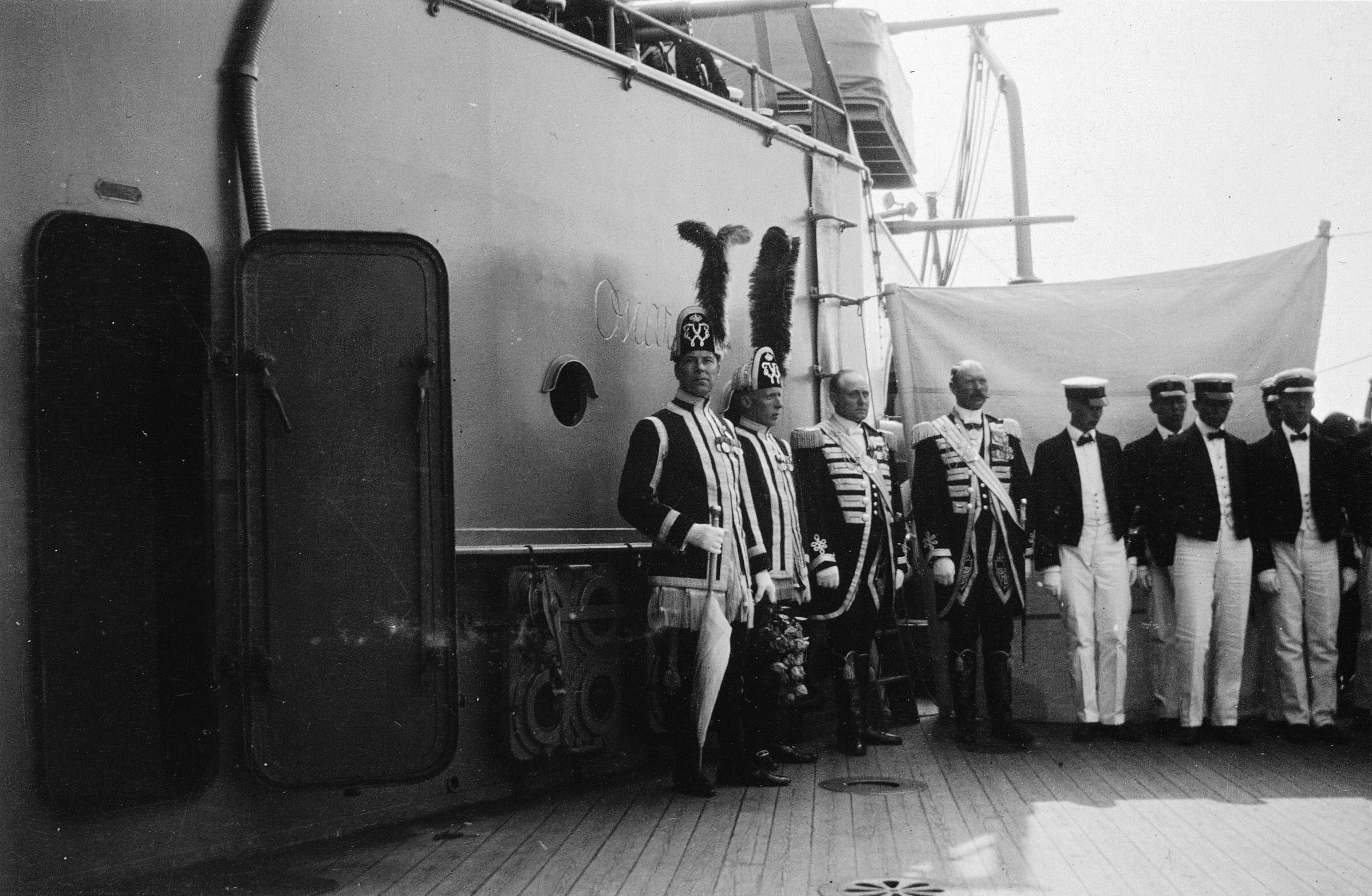
Officers on deck while visiting the Tsar of Russia in 1912

Design of the new vessel was approved on 22 May 1903 and an order placed at Lindholmens Mekaniska Verkstad in Gothenburg on 23 September at the cost of 3,390,000 kr. Construction work started shortly afterwards. The ship's namesake King Oscar II was to launch the vessel on 6 June 1905. However, a combination of a labour dispute and the escalating dissolution of the union between Norway and Sweden led to delays until 10 June, when the ship was launched with a non-traditional send off, as the use of champagne in the ceremony had been prohibited by Queen Sophia. It was the first time that a Swedish warship had been named after a living monarch since 1824.

Oscar II entered service as flagship of the Swedish Navy on 3 April 1907. The ship was soon showing the flag, travelling to England in the middle of the year, and then returning in time for the King to sign his name on the aft conning tower shortly before he died. The ship continued to host Swedish royalty, leaving for Saint Petersburg, Russia, on 29 April 1908 to take Prince Wilhelm, Duke of Södermanland, to marry Grand Duchess Maria Pavlovna and transporting King Gustav V to Sassnitz, Germany, on 6 July 1909 where he met Wilhelm II.

The next three years saw the ship tour the Mediterranean Sea and then subsequently visit ports in many countries including Denmark, England, Germany and the Netherlands. In the middle of 1912, the vessel carried the King and Queen Victoria of Sweden to Finland to visit Nicholas II of Russia. Shortly afterwards, the ship was briefly mobilised as flagship of the Swedish fleet in response to the First Balkan War, but swiftly returned to royal duties, providing transport for the King's visit to Christian X of Denmark in June 1913, welcoming Victor Emmanuel III of Italy in July 1913 and escorting President Raymond Poincaré of France in July 1914.

When the First World War started in that same month, the Swedish fleet was mobilised with Oscar II as flagship to protect the nation's trade routes and shipping fleet. Due to the country's neutrality in the war, the vessel spent much of the war practicing firing and damage control. However, the ship participated in the invasion of Åland in 1918, arriving on 19 February along with the newer coastal defence ship HSwMS Sverige and a contingent from the Vaxholm Coastal Artillery Regiment. Sweden had an interest in the islands, which heightened following Sweden's recognition of Finnish independence and reports of atrocities committed against the Swedish-speaking inhabitants. With Russian forces in disarray due to Russian Civil War, with both sides claiming the islands, the Swedish government saw an opportunity to occupy them. However, Germany was also interested in gaining the islands as part of a wider strategy to control the Baltic Sea and sent a substantial fleet at the same time. Oscar II was on station on 5 March when the German dreadnought battleships SMS Rheinland and Westfalen arrived. The ship was a fundamental part of the Swedish display of force that preceded negotiations for a peaceful settlement that resulted in Germany gaining possession. The vessel was one of the last Swedish units to leave the islands, finally departing on 23 April.

Decommissioned in September 1918 in need of a complete overhaul, the ship remained out of service for the next eleven years apart from a brief period in late 1923 and early 1924. Oscar II was brought back into service in 1929 and was mainly used for training, attached to the Royal Swedish Naval Staff College. Operations were not confined to Sweden, though, and the ship visited Portsmouth, England, in 1935.

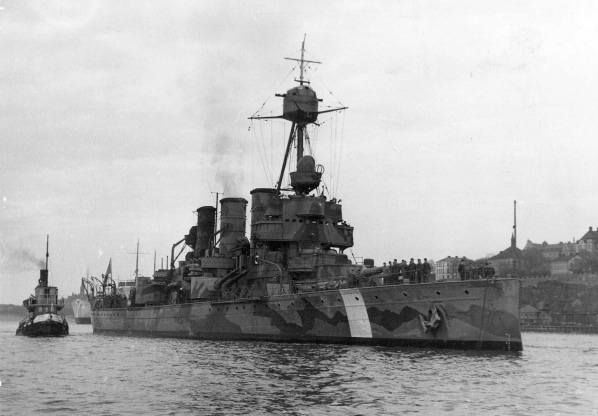
HSwMS Oscar II with camouflage in 1944.

The vessel was given a significant upgrade in the run up to the Second World War, the work being completed in November 1939. The freshly modernised ship then served as part of the Swedish Navy. During the war, the vessel was posted to Karlskrona but saw no action as Sweden once again remained neutral.

After the war, Sweden decided to retire the whole fleet of coastal defence ships. Oscar II had one last royal journey, to bring the body of Prince Gustaf Adolf, Duke of Västerbotten, home after he died in a KLM Douglas DC-3 air crash at Copenhagen Airport on 26 January 1947, before being decommissioned on 24 February 1950. The hulk was subsequently equipped with learning spaces and used for training managing leaks and radioactive contamination, including decontamination drills. After a further twenty-six years in service, the vessel was sold for 850,000 kr on 11 September 1974 to be broken up for scrap. Oscar II was the last coastal defence ship in the Swedish Navy, outlasting the more modern HSwMS Gustaf V by four years.

== See also ==
- List of coastal defence ships of the Swedish Navy
