= HSwMS Göta =

Swedish coastal defence ship

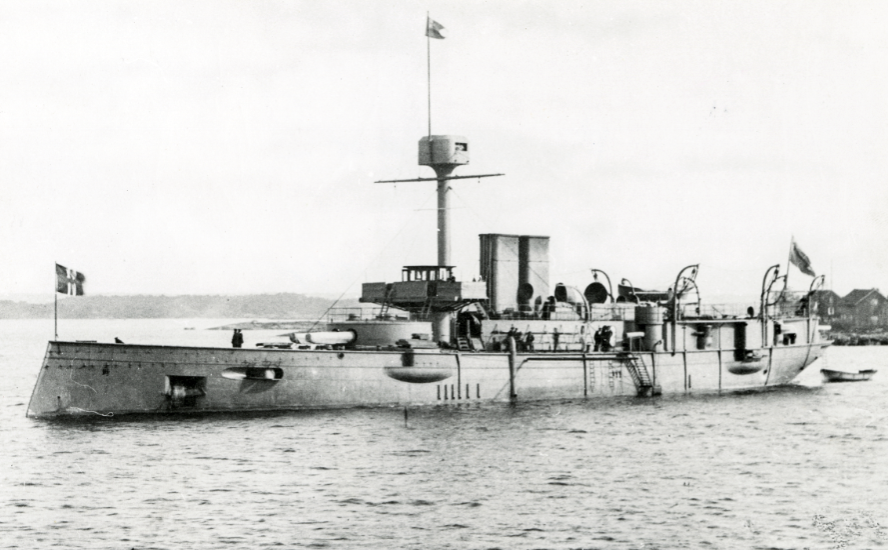
- Göta at sea

HSwMS Göta was a Svea-class coastal defence ship that served in the Royal Swedish Navy in the nineteenth and twentieth centuries. Armed with a main armament of two 10 in (250 mm) guns mounted in a single turret, the vessel was launched in 1891 and reconstructed between 1901 and 1904.
