= HSwMS Tapperheten (1785) =

1785 Swedish Ship of the Line

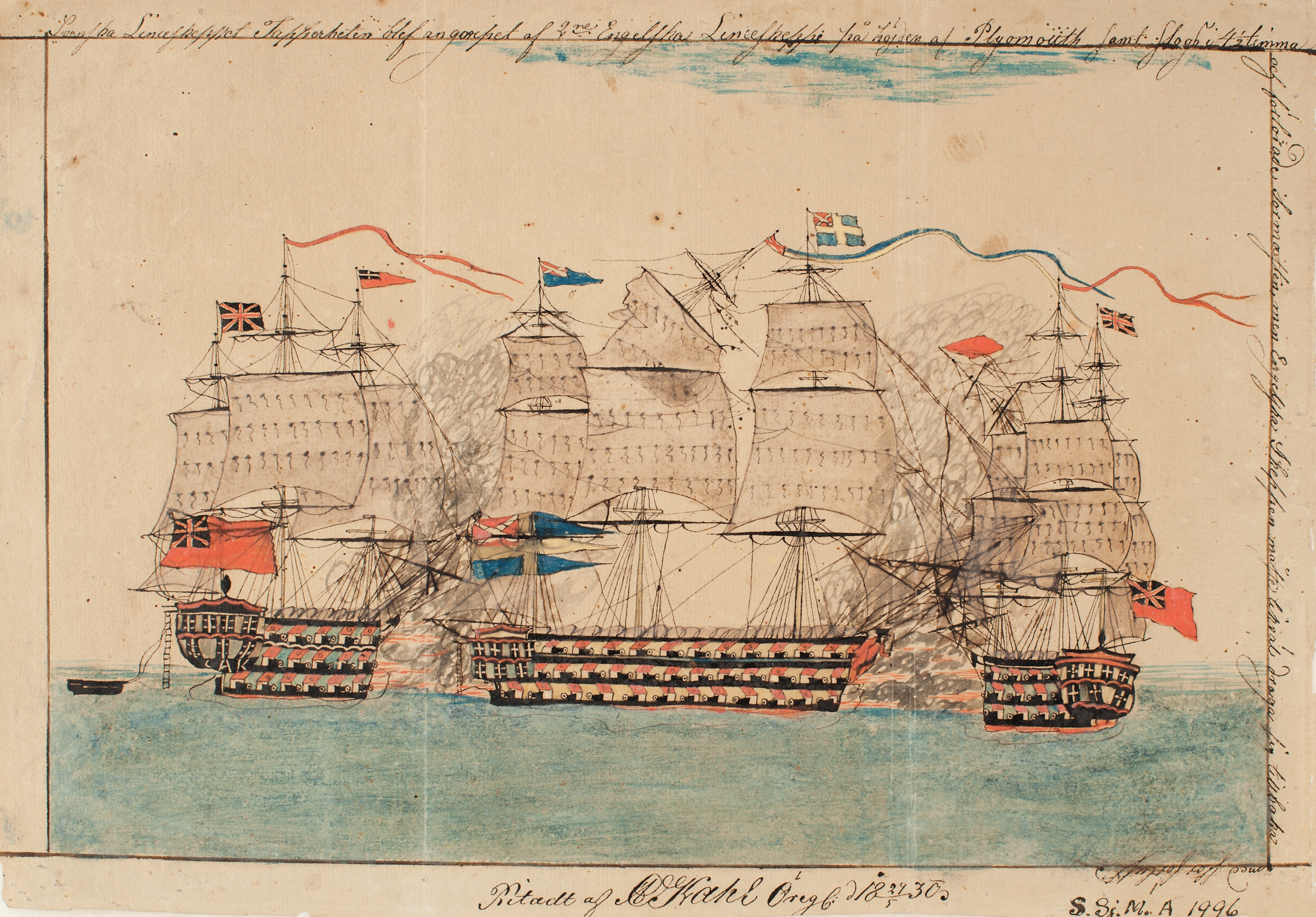
- Tapperheten engaged with two British ships of the line. Drawing by A. C. Kahl, 1830.

History

Sweden
- Name: Tapperheten
- Builder: Karlskrona Naval Shipyard
- Laid down: 31 August 1785
- Launched: 21 October 1785
- Commissioned: 1785
- Decommissioned: 1826
- Fate: Sold in New York, 1826, and scrapped
- Notes: Designed by Fredrik Henrik af Chapman; 10th ship in a series based on the prototype Wasa

General characteristics
- Type: Ship of the line
- Length: 49.4 m (162 ft 1 in)
- Beam: 13.5 m (44 ft 3 in)
- Complement: Approx. 567
- Armament: 64 guns

Tapperheten (English: Valour) was a Swedish ship of the line designed by Fredrik Henrik af Chapman and built at the Karlskrona Naval Shipyard. She was laid down on 31 August 1785 and launched on 21 October that year. As the tenth ship in a series modeled after the prototype Wasa, she was a two-decker armed with 64 guns.

== Construction ==
She measured 167 Swedish feet (approximately 49.4 m, 162 ft 1 in) in length and 45.9 feet (13.5 m, 44 ft 3 in) in beam.

== Service history ==
The ship participated in several major battles during the Russo-Swedish War (1788–1790), including:

- Battle of Öland (1789)
- Battle of Reval
- Vyborg Bay escape

On 21 May 1790, she ran aground and had to jettison her lower deck guns to be refloated. Other warships in the fleet later donated replacement guns.

She later served during the Finnish War (1808–1809), including a blockade of the port of Slite beginning on 12 May 1808 during the Russian occupation of Gotland. In 1809, she was reassigned as a blockship in Karlskrona.
