= Lindholmens =

Shipyard in Gothenburg, Sweden

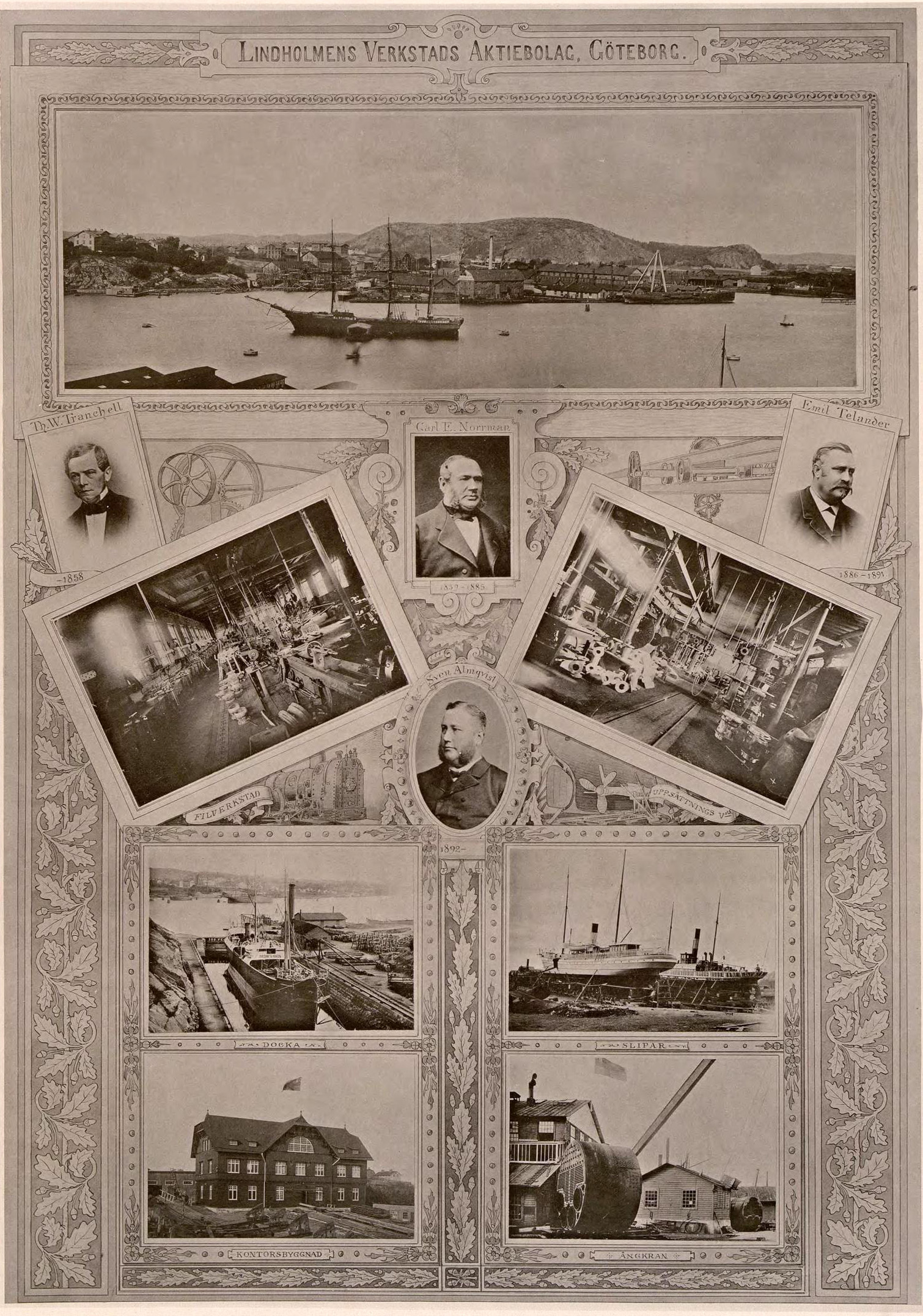
- Lindholmen lithograph from 1894
- Industry: Shipbuilding
- Founded: 1848; 178 years ago in Gothenburg, Sweden
- Founders: Theodor Wilhelm Tranchell (1853); Sven Almqvist (1891)
- Defunct: 1976
- Headquarters: Lindholmen, Gothenburg, Sweden
- Key people: Hugo Hammar; Ludvig Nobel
- Production output: 1848–1976
- Total equity: SEK 1,000,000 (1891)
- Number of employees: 1,496 (1891)
- Parent: Motala (1858–1891); Axel Johnson (1941–1971); Eriksbergs (1971–1976)

Lindholmens or Lindholmen varv was a shipyard on the Göta älv in Gothenburg, Sweden. Named after the small leaf linden that grew on the island, Lindholmen was founded in 1848 and closed in 1976. It was at one time the largest employer in Gothenburg and produced some of the most powerful ships in the Swedish Navy, as well as the first modern oil tanker.

== Early years ==
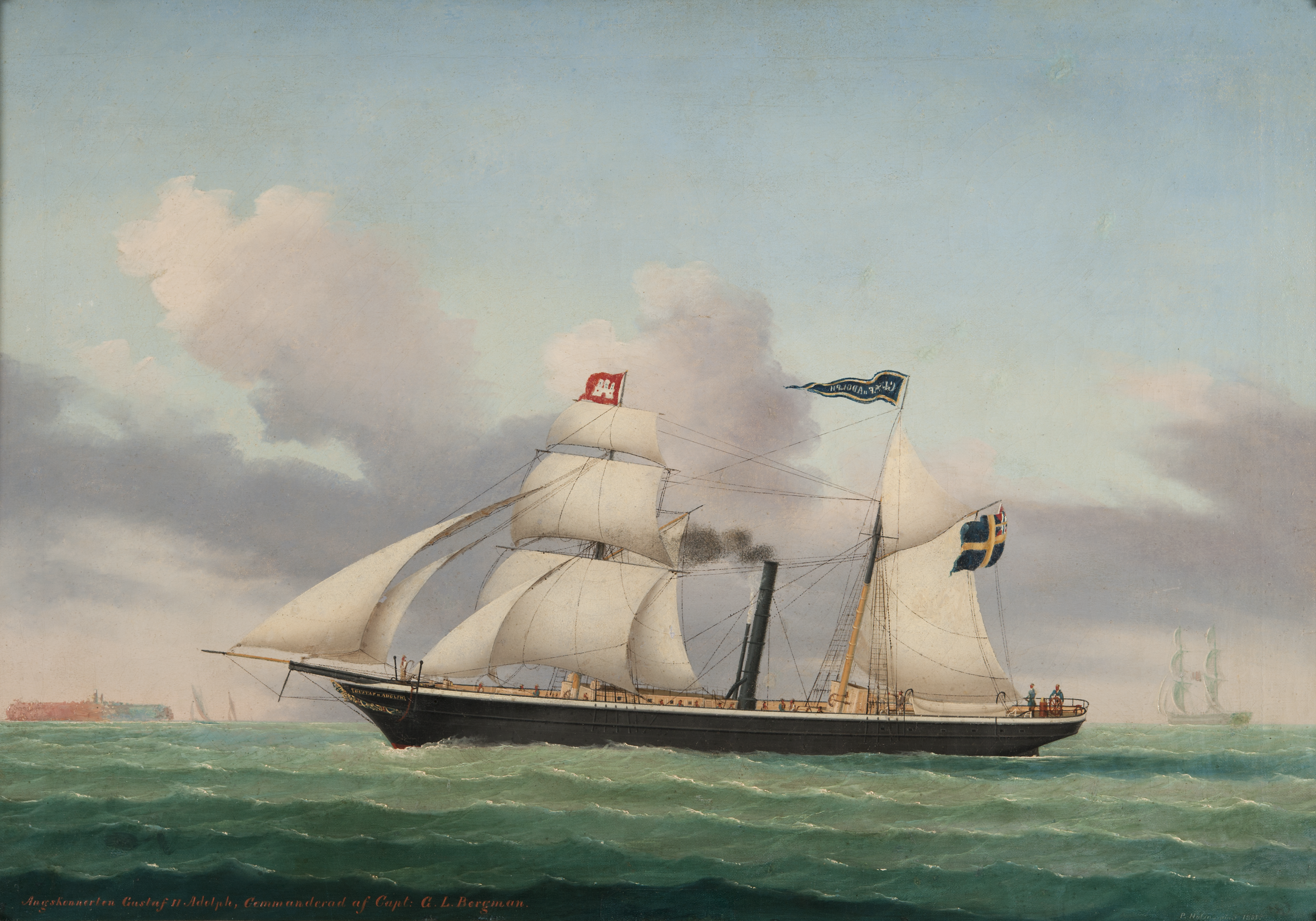
Gustaf II Adolf, the first iron-hulled ship

There is evidence that there was "a loading place (...) a loading dock with a storage bed of ship repair beams" (Swedish: en lastageplats (...) en lastagebrygga med upphalningsbädd av bjälkar för fartygsreparation) in 1844 and the first ship known to have been built at the yard, the brig Aurora, was launched in 1848, but the history of the company dates from the foundation of a joint stock company called the Lindholmens Varvs- och Fabriksaktiebolag in 1853. The company was one quarter owned by Motala Verkstad and specialised in constructing ships of steel. The first steel steamship, Gustaf II Adolf was launched on 13 December 1854.

The shipyard subsequently constructed a number of major ships, including coastal defence ships for the Swedish Navy and icebreakers for Russia. One of the most important vessels was Zoroaster, constructed for Branobel to designs of Ludvig Nobel, the first modern oil tanker. The company employed 1,496 people by 1891 and was Gothenburg's largest employer.

== Lindholmens Verkstads AB ==
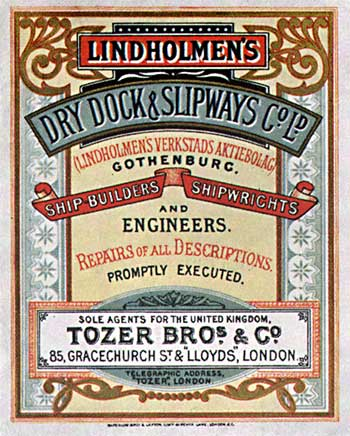
Publicity card from about 1900

Economic factors caused Motala Verksted to go bankrupt in 1891 and the shipyard was sold for SEK 820,000 to a consortium of companies and individuals. Sven Almqvist took over the management and formed a new company, Lindholmens Verkstads AB, with SEK 1,000,000 capital. The new business employed Hugo Hammar, fresh from the United States and later to lead Götaverken, as the chief engineer. New commissions came in from Svenska Lloyd and, in 1903, the company was asked to build the Swedish Navy's new flagship Oscar II. Other large ships followed, including two 6,500-gross register ton (GRT) cargo vessels for the Axel Johnson Group, named Axel Johnson and Annie Johnson, launched in 1910 and 1911 respectively.

In 1912, AB Bergsund purchased a majority of Motala Verksted, and so acquired their shares in Lindholemen. The company attempted to consolidate its operations to save money, but the challenge proved too difficult and in 1917, Lindholemen was bought out by Gothenburg Bank.

== AB Lindholmen-Motala ==
The company saw substantial growth in the years immediately following World War I. By 1920, the company was larger than its former parent and bought all the shares in Motala Verksted for SEK 2.6 million. The new company was named AB Lindholmen-Motala. However, the business limited itself to constructing steam-powered vessels and so was incapable of accessing the emerging motor ship market.

== AB Linholmens Varv ==
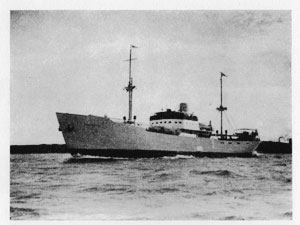
Astri, the first motor ship

The 1930s saw another change in company structure as the steam engine business was left behind and the company focused on diesel powered motor ships. A new company, AB Linholmens Varv, was formed on 5 September 1936 with SEK 700,000 capital. Astri, a cargo ship of 2,557 gross register tons (GRT), was the first motor ship produced, launching in 1937. The company had an increasingly strong relationship with the Axel Johnson Group, who acquired the business in 1941. During World War II, the shipyard saw a boom, producing 48,000 gross register tons (GRT). The company continued to operate as part of the Axel Johnson Group after the war. In 1960, the company still employed 1,800 staff.

== Last years ==
The end of the 1960s were a difficult time for the Swedish shipbuilding industry and in 1971 the Axel Johnson Group sold the shipyard, now known as Lindholmens Mekaniska Verkstad, to merge with nearby Eriksbergs Mekaniska Verkstad. The plan was to construct a new sectional yard, but economic conditions were unfavourable. The end was in sight when Eriksbergs moved production from Lindholmen, the last vessel being built in 1974. The shipyard closed in 1976, the first in a series of closures which struck the Swedish shipbuilding industry. Since 1999, the site has been occupied by Lindholmen Science Park.
