= Äran-class coastal defence ship =

Warship class of the Swedish Navy

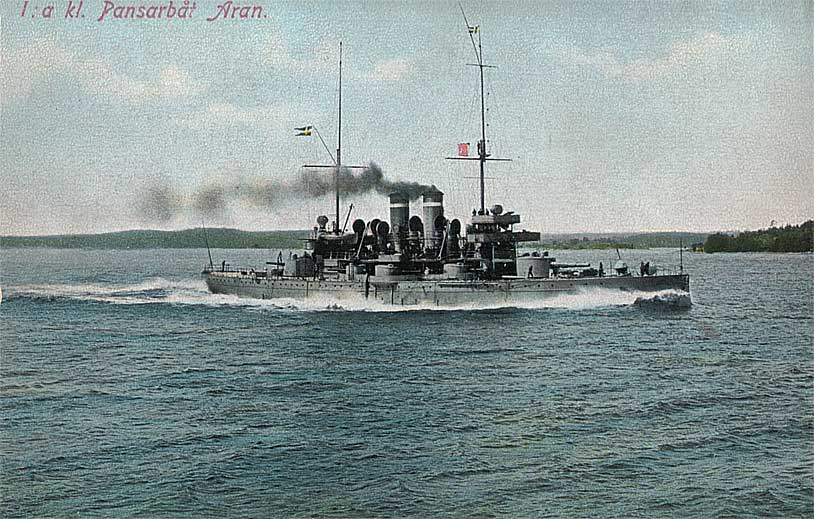
- HSwMS Äran

Class overview
- Name: Äran class
- Builders: Bergsund, Finnboda; Kockums, Malmö (2); Lindholmens, Gothenborg
- Operators: Swedish Navy
- Preceded by: Dristigheten
- Succeeded by: Oscar II
- Completed: 4

General characteristics
- Type: Coastal defense ship
- Displacement: 3,592 tons
- Length: 87.48 m (287 ft 0 in)
- Beam: 15 m (49 ft 3 in)
- Draught: 5 m (16 ft 5 in)
- Propulsion: 6,500 hp (4,800 kW), two shafts
- Speed: 17 knots (31 km/h)
- Complement: 285
- Armament: 2 × 8.2 in (21 cm) (2 × 1); 6 × 6 in (15 cm) (6 × 1); 10 × 5.7 cm (2.2 in) (10 × 1); 2 torpedo tubes
- Armour: 7 in (18 cm) belt; 7.5 in (19 cm) turret

The Äran class was a class of coastal defence ships of the Swedish Navy. The class comprised Äran, Wasa, Tapperheten and Manligheten.

== Design ==
=== Dimensions and machinery ===
The ships of the class were 87.48 metres (287 ft 0 in) long, had a beam of 15 metres (49 ft 3 in), a draught of 5 metres (16 ft 5 in), and had a displacement of 3,592 tons. The ships were equipped with 2 shaft reciprocating engines, which were rated at 6,500 indicated horsepower (4,800 kW) and produced a top speed of 17 knots (31 km/h; 20 mph).

=== Armour ===
The ships had belt armour of 7 in (18 cm) and 7.5 in (19 cm) turret armour.

=== Armament ===
The main armament of the ships were two 8.2 in (21 cm) single turret guns. Secondary armament included six single 6 in (15 cm) guns and ten 5.7 cm (2.2 in) single guns.

== Ships ==
Äran was laid down at the Lindholmens shipyard in Gothenburg and launched in 1902. Wasa was laid down at the Bergsund shipyard in Finnboda and was also launched in 1902. Tapperheten and Manligheten were both laid down at Kockums Shipyard in Malmö and were launched in 1904.

| Ship name | Launched | Completed | Struck | Fate |
|---|---|---|---|---|
| Äran | 14 August 1901 | 7 September 1902 | June 1947 | Broken up, 1961 |
| Wasa | 29 May 1901 | 6 December 1902 | March 1940 | Broken up, 1961 |
| Tapperheten | 7 November 1901 | April 1903 | June 1947 | Broken up, 1952 |
| Manligheten | 1 December 1903 | 3 December 1904 | February 1950 | Converted to pontoon, 1956; broken up, 1984 |

== Service ==
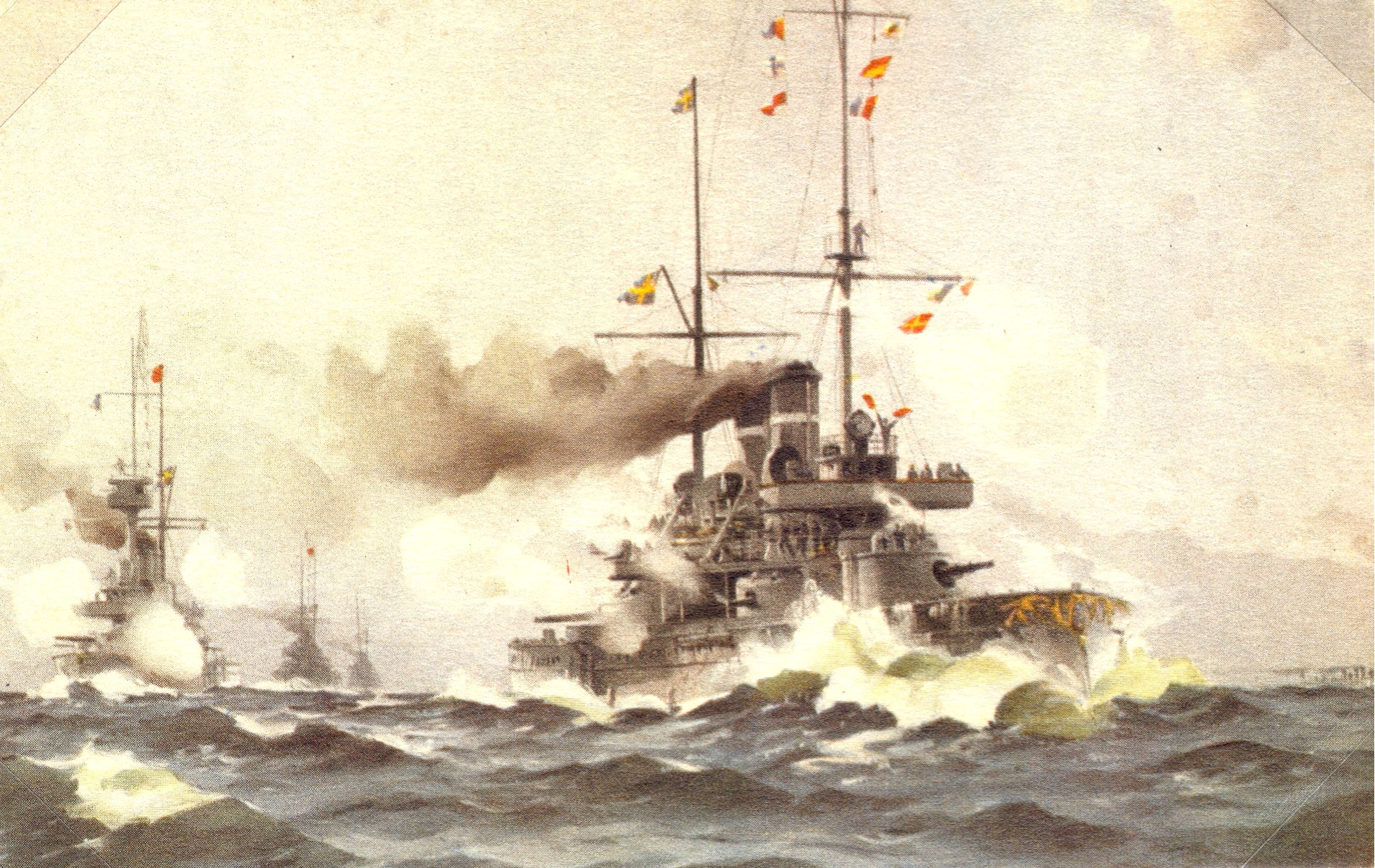
Äran-class ships during combat exercise. Oil painting by Herman af Sillén.

Tapperheten ran aground on rocks near Stockholm in January 1914. The vessel was refloated in July by blasting the rocks out from under her, repaired and returned to service by the end of 1915.
