= HSwMS Dristigheten =

Swedish coastal defence ship

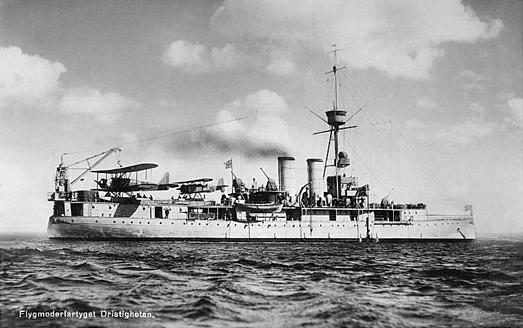

Class overview
- Preceded by: Oden class
- Succeeded by: Äran class
- Completed: 1

History

Sweden
- Name: Dristigheten
- Builder: Lindholmens, Gothenburg
- Laid down: 1898
- Launched: 28 April 1900
- Commissioned: 5 September 1901
- Decommissioned: 13 June 1947

General characteristics
- Class & type: Dristigheten-class coastal defence ship
- Displacement: 3445 t
- Length: 86.87 m (285 ft 0 in)
- Beam: 14.78 m (48 ft 6 in)
- Draught: 4.88 m (16 ft 0 in)
- Installed power: 8 Yarrow boilers, 5,400 ihp (4,000 kW)
- Propulsion: 2 screws; 2 triple-expansion engines
- Speed: 16.5 knots (30.6 km/h; 19.0 mph)
- Range: 2,040 nmi (3,780 km; 2,350 mi) at 10 knots (19 km/h; 12 mph)
- Complement: 262
- Crew: 427
- Armament: As coastal defense ship; 2 × single 21 cm (8.3 in) guns; 6 × single 15.2 cm (6 in) guns; 10 × single 5.7 cm (2.2 in) guns; 2 × single 45.7 cm (18 in) torpedo tubes; As an aircraft tender, 1930; 4 x 75 mm (2.95 in)/50 cal AA; 2 x 40 mm (1.57 in)/60 cal AA; 4 machine guns
- Armour: Harvey armour; Belt: 200 mm (7.9 in); Turrets: 200 mm (7.9 in); Deck: 25 mm (1 in)
- Aircraft carried: 3 floatplanes
- Aviation facilities: Crane

HSwMS Dristigheten was a Swedish Navy coastal defence ship, and the single ship of her class. She was launched 28 April 1900. She was rebuilt as a seaplane tender in 1930. Built in 1898–1901, she was a modified version of the Oden class of 1894–1899, with a slightly longer hull and different armament. The ship was laid down in 1898 at Lindholmens' yard, Gothenburg, launched on 28 April 1900 and completed in 1901. She served without distinction until 1930 when she was stripped for conversion to an aircraft tender. As a seaplane carrier she was given a hangar and deck aft, with cranes to handle three floatplanes. After the Second World War, the old ship was reclassified as a target, and served until 1961, when she was scrapped.

== Captains ==
- 1919–1920 – Arvid Hägg
- 1938–1938 – Moje Östberg

== Bibliography ==
- Campbell, N. J. M. (1979). "Sweden". In Chesneau, Roger & Kolesnik, Eugene M. (eds.). Conway's All the World's Fighting Ships 1860–1905. Greenwich: Conway Maritime Press. pp. 360–363. ISBN 0-8317-0302-4.
