= 57 mm kanon M/89B =

- Type: Naval gun
- Place of origin: Sweden

Production history
- Manufacturer: Finnspong, Stockholm Vapenfabrik, Bofors
- Variants: M/89, M/92

Specifications
- Mass: 380 kg (840 lb)
- Length: 3.108 m (10 ft 2 in)
- Barrel length: 2.517 m (8 ft 3 in) (L/50)
- Shell weight: 2.7 kg (6 lb)
- Caliber: 57 mm (2.2 in)
- Muzzle velocity: 856 m/s (2,810 ft/s)

The 57 mm kanon M/89B was a Swedish naval gun deployed aboard early destroyers as their secondary armament.

The M89 gun had a shorter 45-caliber barrel that gave the gun a muzzle velocity of 659 m/s (2,163 ft/s) and a weight of 749 lb (339.7 kg).

== Bibliography ==
- Friedman, Norman (2011). Naval Weapons of World War One: Guns, Torpedoes, Mines and ASW Weapons of All Nations; An Illustrated Directory. Barnsley, UK: Seaforth Publishing. ISBN 978-1-84832-100-7.
