= Riga expedition (1905) =

- Part of the Russian Revolution of 1905
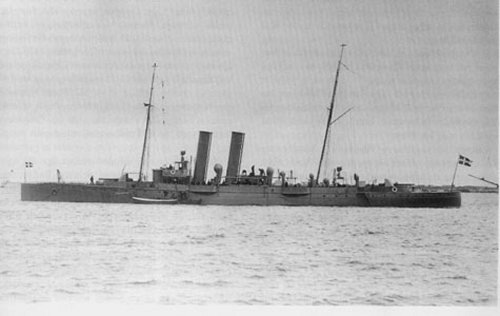
- Swedish ship HMS Örnen
Date	December, 1905
Location	Riga (modern-day Latvia) and Saint Petersburg
Result	See § Aftermath

Belligerents
Sweden; United Kingdom; German Empire Russian Empire	Revolutionaries

Commanders and leaders
Ludvig Åkerhielm; Captain Hermelin; A. Friberg Colonel von Antonius	No organized leadership

Units involved
HMS Psilander; HMS Örnen; HMS Drottning Sofia (United Kingdom of Great Britain and Ireland) S/S Oihonna; S/S Batavia; S/S Kherwieder Riga gendarmerie	Various mobs/gangs

Strength
2 Örnen-class cruisers 4 Steamers	Unknown; presumably large

Casualties and losses
50 missing	Unknown

The Riga expedition (Swedish: Rigaexpeditionen) was a naval expedition conducted by the Swedish Navy to aid its citizens located in the Russian Empire during the revolution of 1905. As a result of a humiliating military defeat at the hands of the Japanese in 1905, unrest spread throughout the Russian Empire the same year. Anarchy was the norm in many cities as various differing groups fought on the streets for dominance and influence. Hundreds would be killed in what would become known as the Russian Revolution of 1905. However, the unrest also affected foreign nationals in the empire. This was the case for the Swedes residing in Russia. There was a sizeable Swedish diaspora in the empire due to economic interests in the country, of which c. 150 of whom were located in Riga and thousands more in Saint Petersburg. In November 1905 the revolution spread to these very cities prompting the local Swedish consulate in Riga to reach out to Stockholm regarding the prospects of a rescue mission being sent to the city. The Swedish government answered these calls and mobilized a fleet of cruisers to escort the Swedes of Russia home. Of the 150 Swedes in Riga, around 30 were brought back home as a result of the expedition.

== Background ==
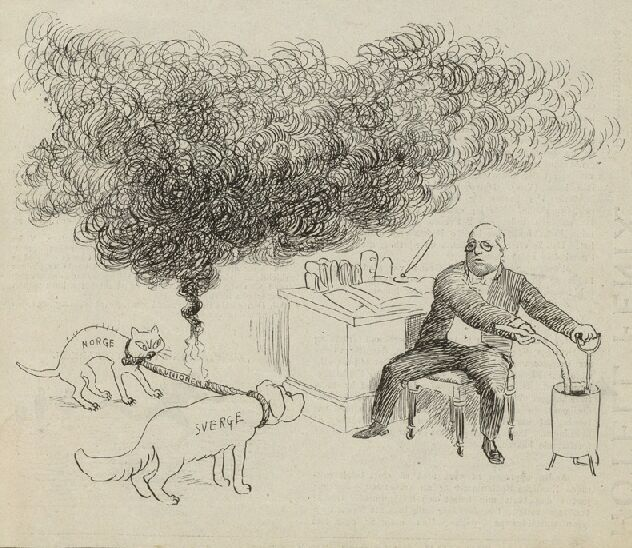
Political cartoon depicting Sweden and Norway

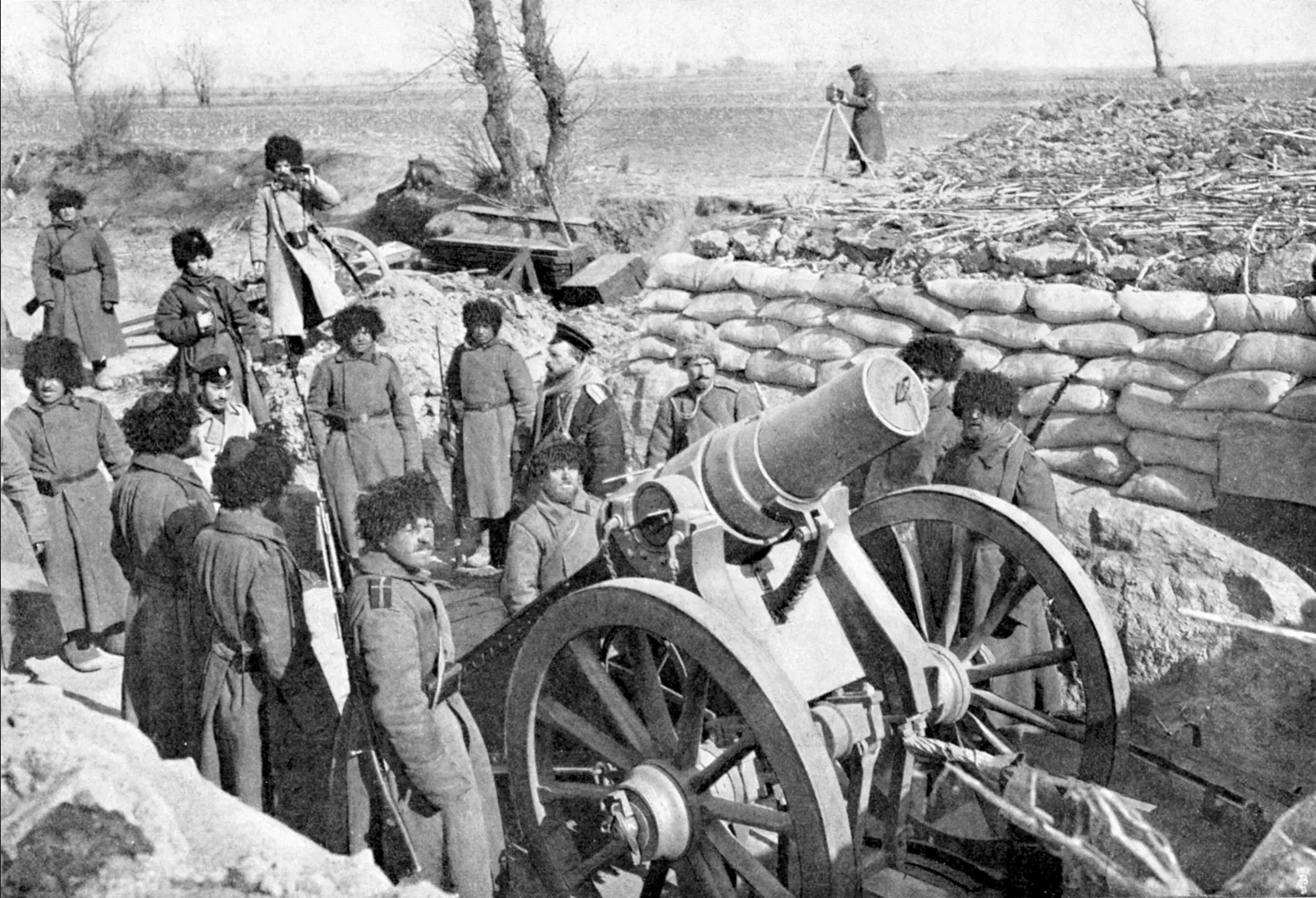
Russian soldiers in Port Arthur during the Russo-Japanese War

On the 8 February 1904, Japanese soldiers attacked Russian positions in Port Arthur, China, unprovoked starting the Russo-Japanese War. The War would result in a clear Japanese victory the next year in 1905. This came as a shock to the international community as Japan became the first Asian nation to defeat a Western power in the modern age. The humiliation caused by this defeat contributed to spreading the desire to revolt against Tsar Nicholas II. Russian society had been radicalizing ever since the 1860s as ideas such as Marxism and Bolshevism spread throughout the empire. Tensions eventually evolved into a general uprising as a response to the Bloody Sunday events where protesters would be fired upon by the military, killing many. Mutinies and clashes erupted in Saint Petersburg which from there spread to other cities. However, the opposition against the autocracy was not united as many of the political factions would also fight each other.

The Swedish observed the developments in Russia with great concern. Many Swedes had emigrated to Russia between the late 1800s to the early 1900s and they were thus in danger of being caught in the crossfire of the revolution. On the 21st of November, the Swedish consulate of Riga submitted a request to Stockholm for the c 150 Swedes of the city to be evacuated. The Swedish government considered sending a naval expedition to Riga as the nation was now free to act more boldly toward Russia due to the state of anarchy the country was in. Furthermore, following the defeat of Russia in the war of 1905, the Swedish high command had lost respect for the Russian military. As a result, the Swedish military grew more confident of their abilities to engage the Russians in combat. However, earlier that year, the Union between Sweden and Norway was dissolved. This meant that Sweden would not be able to rely on the resources of the Norwegian Navy in any aggressive action toward Russia. Some feared that the Norwegians would attack Sweden from the West if Swedish forces were busy in Russia. Nevertheless, the Swedish Navy would eventually be tasked with aiding the Swedish citizens in Riga and Saint Petersburg. Under A. Friberg, the Steamer Drottning Sofia was rented to serve as the transport for the Swedish citizens who applied to follow the ship home, of whom there were 80. To guard the steamer, two Örnen-class cruisers would be deployed to escort the vessel. Those were HMS Örnen and HMS Psilander. The former was to be led by Ludvig Åkerheilm and the latter captain Hermelin. The duration of the expedition would not be able to exceed a month as the ships' supplies could only support the fleet within that time frame. The plan was for the HMS Psilander to first set off to Saint Petersburg with Swedish consul to Russia, Wrangels, before next heading toward Reval while the HMS Örnen remained home preparing to set sail toward Riga.

== Expedition ==
=== HMS Psilander's expedition ===
On the 11 December, HMS Psilander set sail toward Kronstadt to later travel to Saint Petersburg. Although, the expedition was conducted without the knowledge of the Russian government, the local fort, "Paul", in Kronstadt made no attempts to stop the incursion. The cruiser arrived in Saint Petersburg the same day. There had occurred no major clashes for ten days at the time of the HMS Psilander's arrival. Nevertheless, the crew onboard the ship contacted numerous Swedish officials in the city regarding the situation and dropped off Swedish envoy Wrangels as planned. However, it is unclear what exactly the HMS Psilander was doing in Saint Petersburg. As it became clear that the situation in the city was under control, the HMS Psilander headed toward Reval on the 12th to provide aid to the Swedes there. The ship had to take shelter from a storm in Kronstadt but otherwise, the journey proceeded without issue. The cruiser arrived in Reval on the 14th and sent an officer into the city to meet with the Swedish vice consul to discuss the situation. The unrest had died down at the time of the HMS Psilander's arrival and many Swedes had already scheduled to be evacuated onboard the S/S Oihonna which was a part of a similar British expedition to the area. The cruiser thus served no purpose in Reval and instead returned home to Stockholm.

=== Foreign expeditions ===
Many of the great powers had also grown concerned about the safety of their citizens in Russia who had for whatever reason traveled to the country. The British sent a naval squadron to the Baltic Sea due to the escalating situation in Russia and the Germans also put together a fleet of their own which was sent to various German consulates along the Russian coast. Additionally, the French sent the cruiser Cassini to Copenhagen to oversee the developments occurring in Russia. In order to retrieve their citizens, the British government sent out a request to a Finnish steamship stock company for one of their steamships to be used as a transport for endangered British citizens in Riga. The company complied and the S/S Oihonna was deployed to transport British refugees from Riga to Stockholm via Hangö. Many Swedes and other foreign nationals were allowed onboard the ship as well, saving them from the potential danger that the revolution posed. A similar action was conducted by the Germans who rented the ship S/S Batavia to be sent to Riga to rescue German citizens. However, the revolutionaries in Latvia and the rest of the Baltic were not fond of the Germans. Many of the rich elite in the Baltic were Germans, making them become the target of harassment. Due to this, when trying to leave the Riga harbor the S/S Batavia was bombarded by local insurgents killing many of the German refugees who were onboard. The German steamship S/S Kherwieder would also come into conflict with Latvian revolutionaries. After that the steamship had unsuccessfully tried to enter the Riga harbor to rescue German refugees, the S/S Kherwieder left for Liepāja. However, the locals closed down the harbor and refused to allow the Germans entry. The two Swedish steamers present in the harbor, S/S Baltic and S/S Cavonia, were thus trapped. The ships received fire from the locals. The breakout attempt of the S/S Cavonia would be successful while the S/S Baltic would remain in Liepāja.

=== HMS Örnen's expedition ===
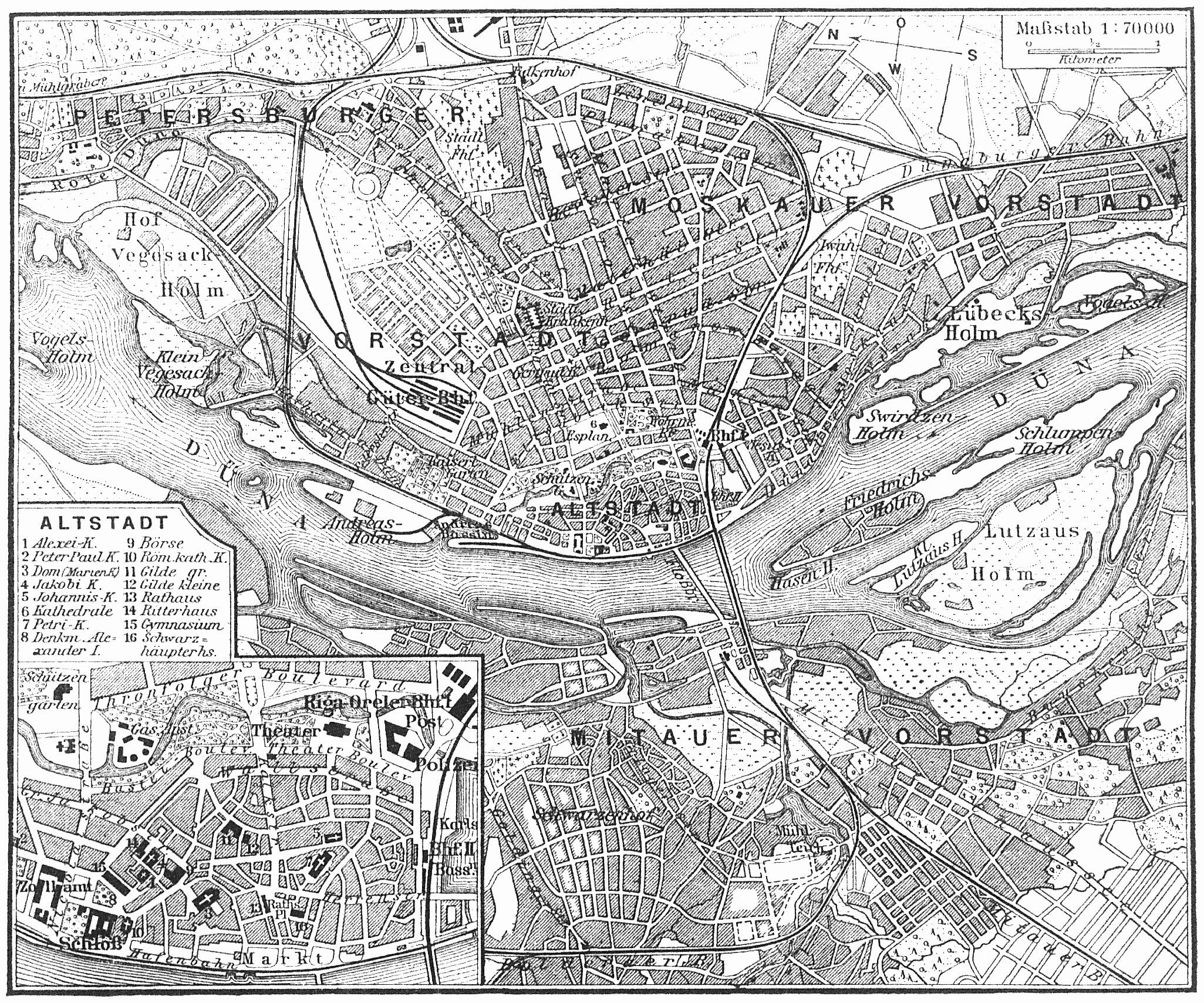
Map of Riga in 1900

On the 12-13 December, HMS Örnen along with HMS Drottning Sofia embarked on their expedition to Riga with vague orders. The HMS Drottning Sofia arrived first. Clashes and unrest had once again erupted in the city and throughout the rest of the country upon the ship's arrival. The unrest was so severe that communications with the Russian government were entirely cut meaning that the Russians did not know of the Swedes' presence in Riga. In light of this, Swedish soldiers were sent into the city to defend the Swedish consulate from attacks. Unbeknownst to the crew of the steamship, the HMS Örnen had stopped just outside of Riga due to a dispute about whether the cruiser was allowed to enter a foreign harbor. As a result, a search party boarded a different naval vessel in order to search for the HMS Örnen. However, while out at sea they were shot at by another vessel carrying revolutionaries and from land, however, no deaths occurred. When the HMS Örnen finally arrived, rumors had spread among the populace that the Swedes had opened fire on a Russian fort on its way into the city. This prompted the locals to act aggressively toward the Swedes and besieged the harbor that the cruiser had anchored in. During cannon exercises onboard the HMS Örnen, fear among the locals spread as the ship's cannon was briefly pointed toward the city, showing that there was some distrust of the Swedes' intentions. However, the cruiser was otherwise a calming generally presence. The local authorities made a point of befriending the Swedish. Riga's governor made numerous visits onboard the Swedish cruiser and Colonel von Antonius, the head of the Riga gendarmerie, acted friendly toward the Swedes. Upon the ship's arrival, hundreds of curious Russian soldiers went down to the harbor to witness the Swedish cruiser. The Swedish crew were additionally gifted packs of cigars by the Russians as gifts. When HMS Drottning Sofia was ready to receive the 80 scheduled passengers, only around 30 arrived of whom 24 were Swedes. The British and American consulates in Riga had requested that their citizens also be allowed to board the steamship. This request was accepted; however, out of the 14 Americans who applied to board the steamship, only 3 would. Other foreign nationals on the HMS Drottning Sofia were 2 Danes and a Norwegian. Åkerhielm expected that the time needed for all the passengers to get seated would be considerable and thus ordered a small Swedish detachment of 12 men to go into the city in order to guard the steamship from the locals. Although the populace generally acted friendly toward the Swedish expedition, they threatened violence if any German refugees were let on board. Captain Åkerheilm would comply with this demand. The HMS Örnen and HMS Drottning Sofia returned safely to Karlskrona with the refugees on the 14 December.

== Controversy ==
While supporting the Swedish in the escort of its citizens back to Sweden, the German newspaper Berliner Tageblatt accused to Swedish of robbing and blundering the populace of Riga. Reportedly, the Swedish soldiers formed gangs between 4-8 men strong and roamed the city in search of stores to rob for money and liquor. The local Italian and German consulates were also robbed by the Swedish according to Berliner Tageblatt. Additionally, allegedly only Swedish nationals were allowed to board the HMS Drottning Sofia. Captain Åkerheilm denied the claims that the Swedish soldiers had acted in this way and condemned the German newspaper. The Swedish government also denied the claims and sent letters to the Italian and German consulates, which Berliner Tageblatt claimed had been robbed by the Swedish, regarding the matter. Both consulates supported the Swedish claims by stating that no Swedish soldiers had ever paid a visit to either one of the consulates. The Swedish government pressured Berliner Tageblatt to issue a correction regarding Swedish action in the city. Although the paper agreed to meet the Swedish demands, any corrections would not be published.

The Norwegian media was suspicious of the intentions behind the Swedish expedition. The Norwegian paper Morgenbladet accused the Swedish of acting aggressively toward locals during cannon exercises onboard the HMS Örnen. In response to these claims, the Swedish paper Dagens Nyheter wrote:

"From a Norwegian standpoint, they should not throw insults toward the Örnen and its chief. The Swedish, under his command, rescued those of non-Swedish nationality, however, only after being requested to do so by the respective nationality's consulate. An exception was made, as the Norwegians had no consular service in Riga, that Norwegian nationals if they so wished, would be allowed to board the Drottning Sofia - and like those of other nationalities, without having to pay a fee. It is not the fault of the Swedish expedition that only one Norwegian would decide to take the Swedes up on their offer, even though many Norwegians had hurried to apply to get a spot on the ship."

— Dagens Nyheter

== Aftermath ==
The HMS Örnen would be decommissioned on the 18 December, four days after its return. Further unrest had erupted in Russia after the Swedish expedition's end, again putting some Swedish diplomats at risk. However, the Russian Revolution of 1905 would not result in an overthrow of the aristocracy and fighting had largely ceased by the beginning of 1906. However, some liberal reform was undertaken by Nicholas II as a result of the unrest. However, small-scale violence would continue in the Baltic until 1908.

In 1919, the private Second Riga expedition was organized to provide humanitarian aid to the city of Riga. Under Captain Hemberg, the steamer S/S Aaron with its crew of three successfully conducted their mission to Riga. However, the situation in Riga remained dire.

== See also ==
- Bibliography of the Russian Revolution and Civil War
- Outline of the Russian Revolutions of 1905 and 1917 and Civil War
- Index of articles related to the Russian Revolution and Civil War
- Invasion of Åland
- Russian Revolution of 1905
- Moroccan expedition (1843-1845)
