= Örnen-class cruiser =

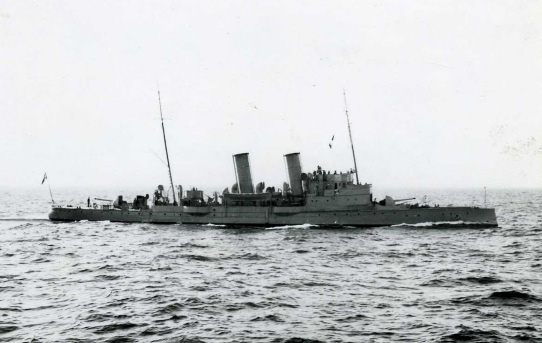
- HSwMS Psilander

Class overview
- Name: Örnen
- Operators: Swedish Navy
- Built: 1896–1899
- In commission: 1897–1947
- Planned: 5
- Completed: 5
- Lost: 1
- Retired: 5

General characteristics
- Type: Torpedo cruiser
- Displacement: 800 long tons (813 t) standard; 846 long tons (860 t) full load
- Length: 69.2 m (227 ft 0 in)
- Beam: 8.2 m (26 ft 11 in)
- Draft: 3.2 m (10 ft 6 in)
- Speed: 20 knots (37 km/h; 23 mph)
- Endurance: 1,200 nautical miles (2,200 km; 1,400 mi) at 12 knots (22 km/h; 14 mph)
- Complement: 113 men
- Armour: 40 mm (1.6 in) on maneuvering tower; 19 mm (0.75 in) on deck

The Örnen class (English: Eagle class) was a class of five torpedo cruisers built for the Swedish Navy between 1896 and 1899. All of the cruisers participated in the Swedish neutrality patrol during the First World War from 1914–1918.

== History ==
During the 1880s, the torpedo cruiser was a type of vessel present in several European naval fleets. These ships were primarily designed for defense against hostile torpedo boats but could also be used to lead their own torpedo boat flotillas. Typically, they were armed with medium-caliber artillery ranging from 12 to 15 cm, along with torpedo tubes.

The question of introducing similar vessels into the Swedish Navy was first raised by the 1879 naval defense inquiry, but it was not until 1892 that any results were achieved. The naval war material committee appointed that year emphasized the need for a type of vessel suitable for reconnaissance operations in coastal areas and archipelagos, as well as torpedo boat combat.

During the 1895 parliament session, funds were allocated for a ship of the proposed type intended to be named Örn. However, since the Royal Norwegian Navy had given the same name to a torpedo boat, it had to be changed to Örnen. In 1896, funds were granted for two sister ships, and in 1897, funds were allocated for two more. The first two were originally supposed to be named Ejdern and Tärnan but were renamed in a decision in late 1897. The decision was made to honor historical Swedish naval figures, and the ships were therefore named Claes Horn and Jacob Bagge, both successful admirals during the Nordic Seven Years' War of 1563–1570. The last two ships were named Psilander and Claes Uggla, the latter known for his actions against the English fleet during the Battle of Orfordness in 1704, and the former a skilled commander during the time of Charles XI who perished in the naval battle off the southern cape of Öland in 1676.

== Design ==
=== Hull ===
Örnen was 67.17 meters (220 ft 4 in) long and 8.14 meters (26 ft 8 in) wide at the waterline, with a draft of 3.2 meters (10 ft 6 in). Psilander and Claes Uggla were slightly longer at 70.71 meters (232 ft) long and 8.3 meters (27 ft 3in) wide, mainly to accommodate the increased number of boilers. The hull was divided into seven watertight compartments, and, along with a 12–19-millimeter (0.47–0.75 in) thick nickel steel armored deck, provided protection for the ship's engine rooms and ammunition lockers. The maneuvering tower and main artillery were shielded by 40 mm (1.6 in) thick armor.

=== Machinery ===
The propulsion machinery on Örnen, Claes Horn, and Jacob Bagge consisted of four cylindrical boilers in two fire rooms that generated steam at 12-kilogram pressure for two triple expansion engines from Motala Works. The ships' steering machinery was steam-powered and purchased from the United Kingdom. It was located below the waterline at the stern for optimal protection.

The engines were located in separate engine rooms, each with horizontal cylinders to fit under the armored deck. They drove individual propellers without gearing. The machinery had a combined output of 4,000 indicated horsepower (3,000 kW), resulting in a maximum speed of 20.2 knots (37.4 km/h; 23.2 mph). Psilander and Claes Uggla had eight boilers instead of four. These were of the Yarrow water-tube type, more modern and lighter than the sister ships' fire-tube boilers. The new boilers could also generate higher steam pressure at 13 kg, allowing for a shorter firing time (heating up and building up steam pressure). This increased the engine power to 2,500 horsepower.

The boilers were fired with coal. The onboard coal storage on Örnen, Claes Horn, and Jacob Bagge could hold approximately 100 tons, allowing for a displacement of 17 knots (31 km/h; 20 mph) for 40 hours, covering nearly 700 nautical miles (1,300 km; 810 mi) or the round trip between Stockholm and St. Petersburg. The entire crew participated in the coal bunkering process. Coal was manually loaded onto the deck in "baskets" from barges or the dock and then tipped into the bins using relatively primitive methods.

=== Armament ===
==== Artillery ====
In proportion to their size, the ships were equipped with a relatively powerful artillery. The main battery consisted of two rapid-firing 12 cm guns m/1894 behind metal shields, one in the bow and the other in the stern. The 12 cm guns had a relatively high firing rate of 8–10 shots per minute, with an estimated range of about 6,000 meters (6,600 yd). To defend against torpedo boats, there were four 57 mm guns m/1889 in projecting platforms, known as tambours, on the hull at the main deck level. They had a firing rate of 35 shots per minute, and the projectiles weighed 2 kg (4.4 lb). The guns had a maximum range of just over 5,000 m (5,500 yd).

==== Torpedoes ====
The torpedo armament included a fixed 38.1 cm underwater tube in the bow below the waterline. The torpedo room adjacent to the tube could accommodate two torpedoes. These torpedoes had a range of 800 meters (870 yd) meters and a speed of 24 knots (44 km/h; 28 mph).

== Modernisation ==
Claes Uggla ran aground on 22 June 1917, at Ulvön Island off the coast of Örnsköldsvik and was sold for salvage the following year. Claes Horn endured significant wear during the neutrality patrol in the First World War and was decommissioned in 1923. Psilander was downgraded to a training ship in the same year and served as an educational vessel for cadets from 1933 to 1935. She was decommissioned in 1937 and used for some time as a target ship. On 3 August 1939, she was sunk during torpedo testing by a 45 cm destroyer torpedo.

Örnen and Jacob Bagge had longer service lives. In the late 1920s, the bow torpedo tubes were removed, and in 1939, both ships were equipped with naval mine rails for a total of twelve mines. Between 1940 and 1941, Örnen underwent a major overhaul, with the 12 cm guns being modernized, and the 57 mm guns being replaced by four double 25 mm anti-aircraft guns m/1932 and two 20 mm anti-aircraft guns m/1940.

In 1927, Jacob Bagge was converted into a seaplane carrier. To accommodate a seaplane, the aft 12 cm gun was removed. In 1941, both Örnen and Jacob Bagge became cadet training ships. They were finally decommissioned in 1947 and subsequently used as target ships.

== Ships of the class ==
Örnen-class ships
Ship	Builder	Launched	Commissioned	Decommissioned	Fate	Picture
HSwMS Örnen	Lindholmen	6 April 1896	4 May 1897	13 June 1947	Sunk as a target in 1950	
HSwMS Claes Horn	Lindberg	9 February 1898	7 August 1898	12 October 1923	Scrapped in 1924	
HSwMS Jacob Bagge	Kockums	30 April 1896	23 November 1898	13 June 1947	Scrapped in 1951	
HSwMS Psilander	Finnboda	25 November 1899	6 August 1900	1 July 1937	Sunk as a target in 1939	
HSwMS Claes Uggla	Bergsund	2 December 1899	28 November 1900	30 August 1917	Wrecked in 1917	
