= Hindenburg (icebreaker) =

German icebreaker ship

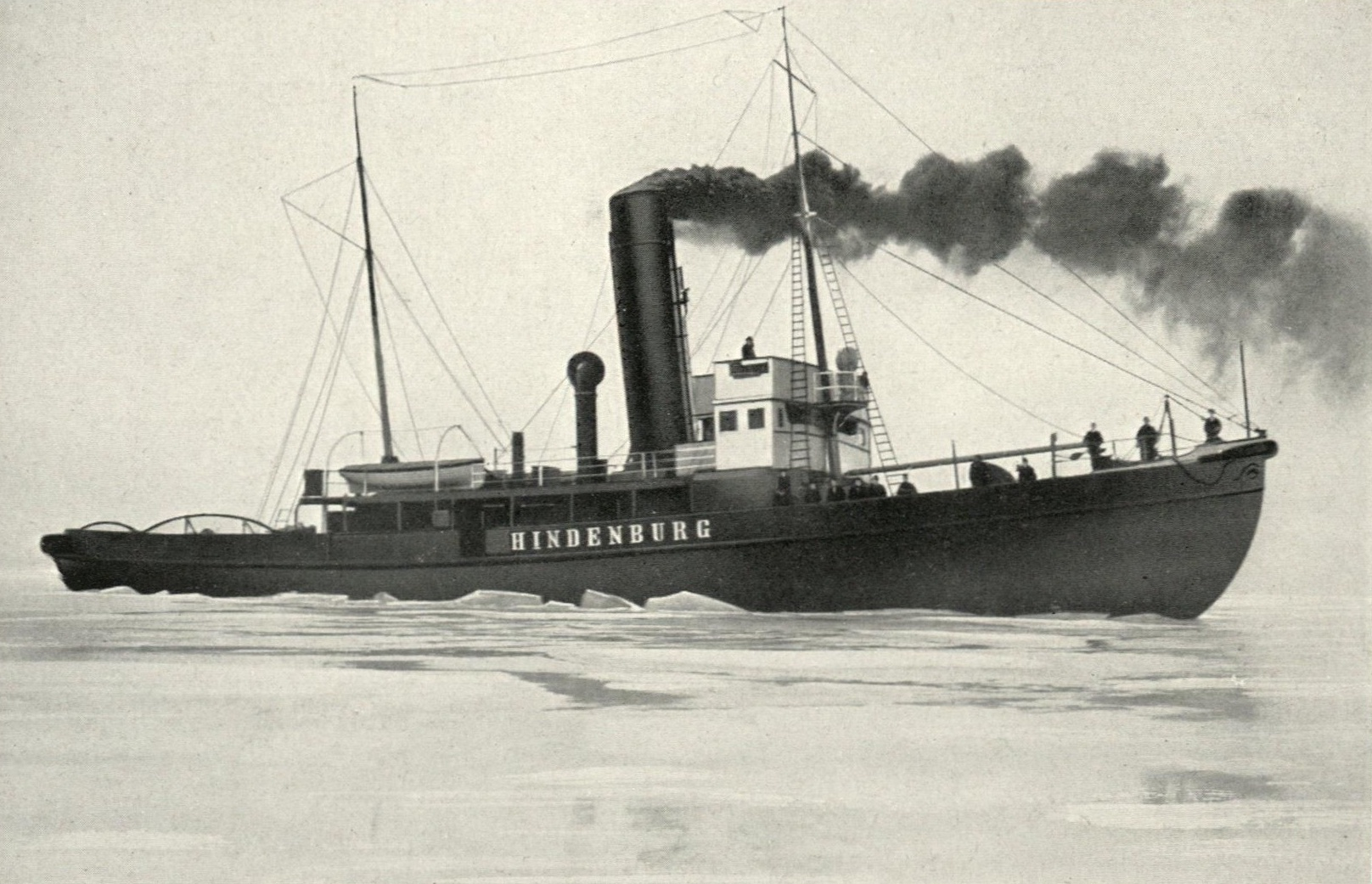

History

German Empire
- Name: Hindenburg
- Owner: Kooperative Kaufmannschaft Stettin
- Builder: Stettiner Oderwerke
- Yard number: 657
- Launched: 15 December 1915
- Completed: 23 December 1916
- Fate: Sunk after mine explosion, 9 March 1918

General characteristics
- Type: Icebreaker
- Displacement: 1,800 t (1,800 long tons)
- Length: 51 m (167 ft 4 in)
- Beam: 12.84 m (42 ft 2 in)
- Height: 5.5 m (18 ft 1 in)
- Draught: 5 m (16 ft 5 in)
- Decks: 8
- Ice class: 1
- Installed power: 1,850 indicated horsepower (1,380 kW)
- Propulsion: one three-cylinder triple expansion steam engine
- Crew: 21

The German icebreaker Hindenburg was built by Stettiner Oderwerke at Stettin-Grabow in 1915 for the Cooperative Merchants' Guild of Stettin (German: Koop. Kaufmannschaft Stettin). The ship was launched on 15 December 1915 but not completed until 23 December 1916. During the Invasion of Åland in February 1918, the Hindenburg was part of Transportflotte I of the Sonderverband Ostsee. The Hindenburg struck a mine off Eckerö, Åland on 9 March 1918 and sunk at 60°11′N 19°25′E. Three crew members died in the event.:The wreck was found 1995 at a depth of 50 meters by dive instructor Richard Johansson from Maltaproffsen and his crew from Ålands Dykcenter and FF-Dyk.
