= HSwMS Claes Uggla =

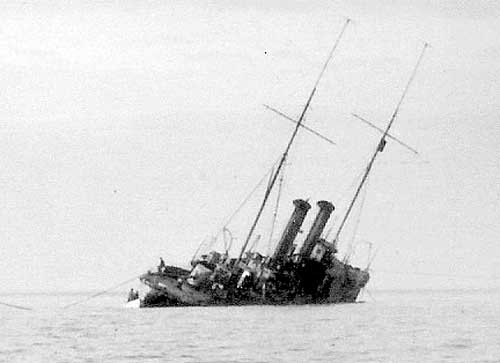
- Claes Uggla as she ran aground in 1917

History

Sweden
- Name: Claes Uggla
- Launched: 9 December 1899
- Commissioned: 28 November 1900
- Fate: Wrecked, 22 June 1917
- Badge

General characteristics
- Type: Torpedo cruiser
- Displacement: 800 long tons (810 t)
- Length: 70.71 m (232 ft) (o/a)
- Beam: 8.3 m (27 ft 3 in)
- Draught: 3 m (9 ft 10 in)
- Armament: 2 × single 120 mm (4.7 in) guns; 4 × single 57 mm (2.2 in) guns; 1 × 38 cm (15 in) torpedo tube

HSwMS Claes Uggla was a Örnen-class torpedo cruiser built for the Swedish Navy during the 1890s, named after the 17th-century admiral Claes Uggla. The ship's name is spelled as Clas Uggla in some English-language sources. She ran aground and sank on 22 June 1917.

== Description ==
Claes Uggla had an overall length of 70.71 metres (232 ft), a beam of 8.3 metres (27 ft 3 in) and a draught of 3 metres (9 ft 10 in) at deep load. The ship displaced about 800 long tons (810 t) at normal load. The steam engines were rated at 4,500 indicated horsepower (3,400 kW) which gave her a speed of 20 knots (37 km/h; 23 mph). Claes Uggla carried up to 100 long tons (100 t) of coal and had a complement of 99 officers and ratings.

== Bibliography ==
- Roberts, John (1979). "Sweden". In Chesneau, Roger & Kolesnik, Eugene M. (eds.). Conway's All the World's Fighting Ships 1860–1905. Greenwich: Conway Maritime Press. pp. 360–363. ISBN 0-8317-0302-4.
