= Bomarsund Bridge =

Bridge in the Sund municipality of the Åland islands

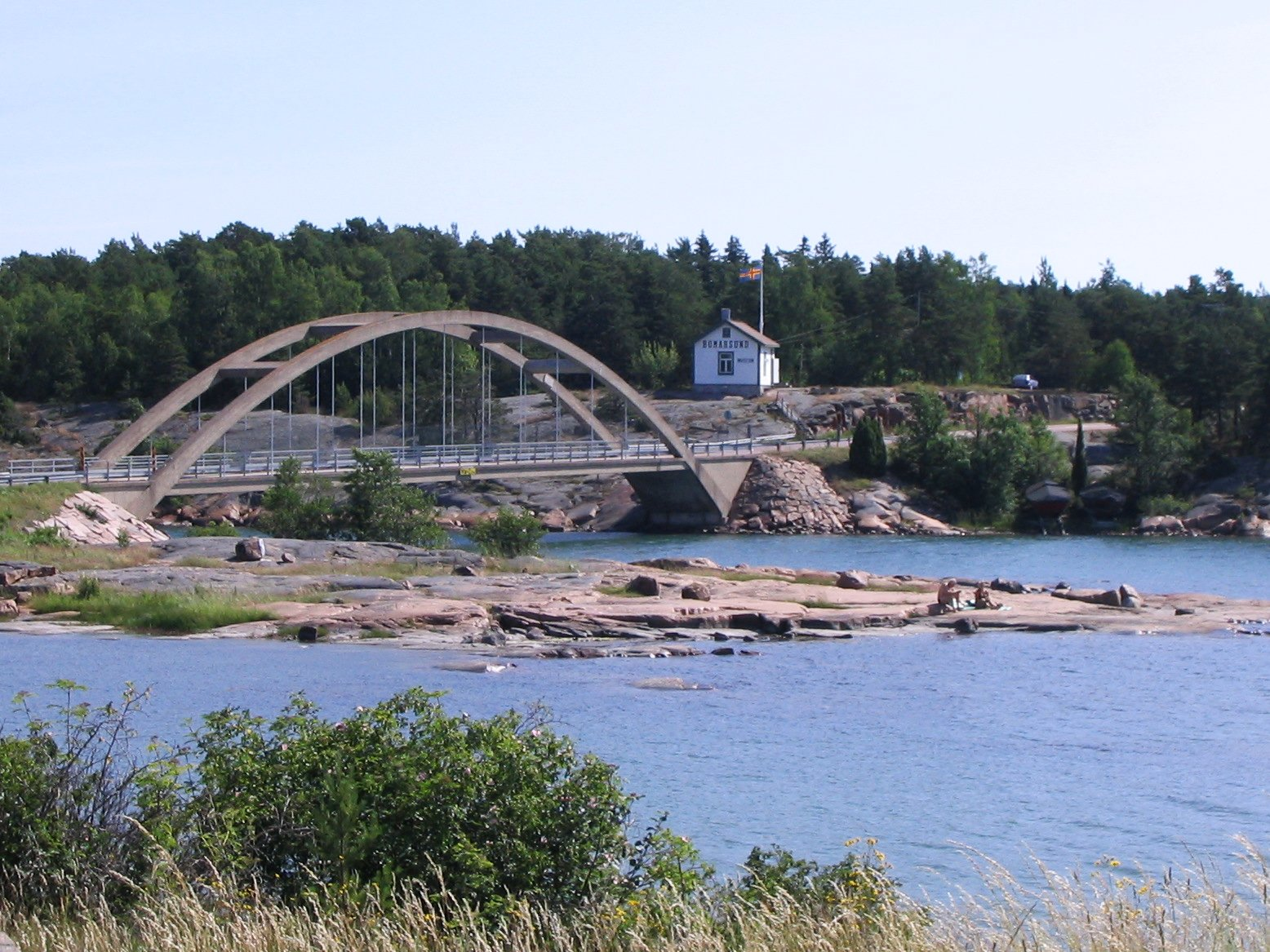
- Coordinates: 60°12′43″N 20°14′33″E

History
- Construction end: 1960s

Location
- Interactive map of Bomarsund Bridge

The Bomarsund Bridge (Swedish: Bomarsunds bro) (also known as the Prästö Bridge) is a bridge in the municipality of Sund, Aland which crosses the Bomarsund strait, connecting Bomarsund on the west, to the island of Prästö on the east.

== History and construction ==
A bridge was originally constructed at this location in 1958. This bridge has been replaced, with the old bridge having reached the end of its life, due to an increase in traffic meaning weight restrictions had to be put in place. The construction of the new bridge was completed in late 2022, with the bridge open for traffic on 14 December 2022. he new bridge is constructed mainly from steel, with the bridge having been designed by Swedish company WSP and built by Eriksson Byggab. The bridge spans a gap of 70.4m with the structure’s total length reaching 80.8m. At their highest point the steel arches reach 12m, and the bridge has a width of 9.55m. The new bridge consists of two traffic lanes, whereas the old bridge had only one - another of the reasons for the replacement of the bridge. The new bridge was inaugurated on 1 May 2023, with a 1km race, and free bread, cake and coffee.

In 2023, it was discovered that the bridge had a fault causing it to vibrate in the wind. The fault was not dangerous and the bridge remains open to traffic.

The bridge forms part of the popular Prästö hiking trail, which runs for 5.5km along a gravel trail.

In 2018 a stamp, designed by Sandra Henriksson, a graphic designer from Åland, was produced by Åland Post depicting the bridge.
