= Pbil m/31 =

Swedish Armored Car

Pansarbil m/31
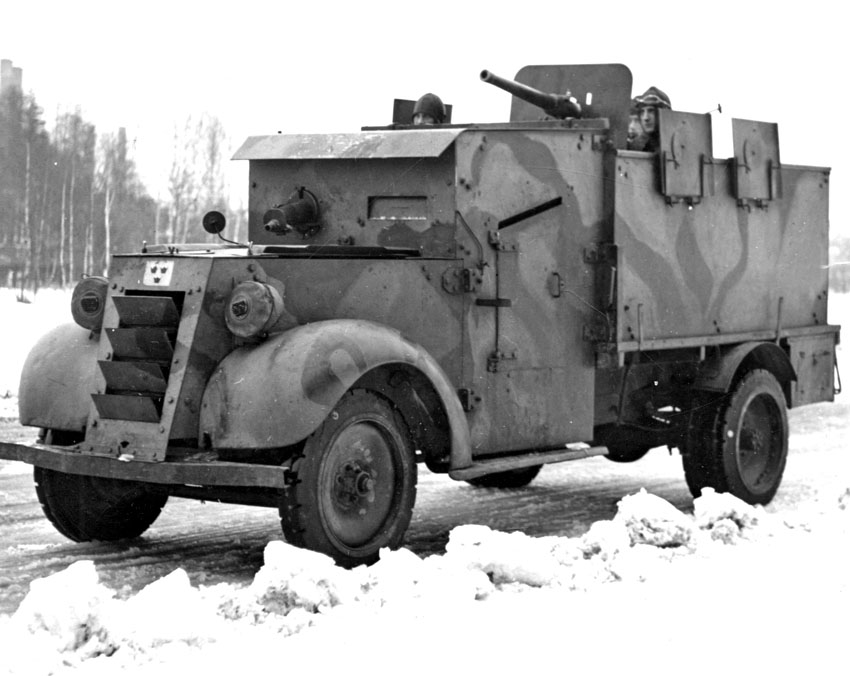
- Pbil m/31 "Cannon Car" Equipped with 37mm Naval Cannon m/98B
- Type: Armored Reconnaissance Car
- Place of origin: Sweden

Service history
- In service: 1931-54 | Used as training vehicles until 1958
- Used by: Sweden

Production history
- Designer: AB Bofors
- Manufacturer: AB Bofors (Body) Chevrolet, Volvo (Chassis)
- No. built: 32
- Variants: See Variants Section

Specifications
- Mass: 4.2 Tonnes
- Length: 3.3 m
- Width: 1.8 m
- Height: 2.75 m
- Crew: 4 - 6
- Maximum firing range: 5 km (20mm Cannon on Pbil m/31 mod.1942)
- Armor: 5.5 - 6.5 mm RHA
- Main armament: 1x) 20 mm akan m/40B Autocannon
- Secondary armament: 2x) 8mm Karlspruta Machine Gun
- Engine: 6 Cylinder in line engine 78 hp 18.5 hp
- Operational range: 150 km
- Maximum speed: 60kph (~37mph) on road
- Steering system: Front Wheel Steering

The Pansarbil modell 1931 (Abbreviated as Pbil m/31) was a Swedish armored car produced for reconnaissance units in the Swedish Army from 1931 and actively used until 1954 before being transferred to training use and finally pulled from all service in 1958.

== Development ==
During the 1920s the Swedish Army was working through and trying many ideas learned and concepts tried during World War 1. Among these ideas and concepts was the prominent idea of modernizing the cavalry brigades through motorization efforts and the procurement or creation of armored cars for the cavalry. Many foreign designs were tested, but special interest in a domestically Swedish design allowed the Tidaholms Bruk Company to produce three experimental vehicles in 1925 and 1926.

The vehicles produced were trucks (produced by Tiadholms Bruk) that had been reinforced by the introduction of an armored body as well as being armed with a rotating turret on what was the truck bed. The First two vehicles were produced in 1925 and designated Pbil fm/25, with the third and final vehicle being produced in 1926 (designated Pbil fm/26). These vehicles were produced purely for experimentation and knowledge gathering for the development of the armed forces and were never intended to be mass-produced.

The knowledge gained from these experimental vehicles would be rather useful in the further development of Swedish armored cars, as Landsverk would soon produce their own model of armored car in 1929 and show case it to the military, where it would be designated Pbil fm/29. This vehicle was very satisfactory in its design but was deemed unsatisfactory from its introduction due to the cost of the vehicle, which made mass production of the vehicle impossible.

Due to this an idea was put forth for a vehicle of lower cost, with work beginning on a prototype vehicle to fill this role in 1929. In the summer of 1930, the first prototype was delivered by Stockholms Tygstation. This prototype was designated Pbil fm/30 and was used in trials by the Livregementets Husarer Cavalry Division (also known as K-3) in Skövde.

With knowledge of how the Pbil fm/30 performed, a new prototype was then ordered from Bofors in 1931. The first example of this Bofors created vehicle would arrive in August of the same year and would be the first example of the Pbil m/31.

== Construction ==
The Pbil m/31 was constructed on the chassis of an ordinary mass production 2.5-ton truck, on which the armored body was mounted. The first vehicles had chassis from Chevrolet, but in later production chassis from Volvo were also used. Since the chassis came in small batches (4 - 8 vehicles at a time) and used different chassis that were produced at the time the vehicles were ordered, no two vehicles were truly the same, with differences including the use of different brake systems, differing wheel types and more.

== Weapons ==
Initially the weapons of the vehicle consisted of an 8mm m/36 Machine gun mounted in the truck's cab along with a second 8mm m/36 Machine gun within a mount in the bed of the vehicle. Later some of the vehicles were fitted with a 37mm m/98B bofors naval gun in the mount in the truck bed. Cars mounting the 37mm gun were designated "Cannon Car" while those mounting only machine guns were designated "Machine Gun Car".

In 1942 it was decided to rearm all of the armored cars with a universal armament. This consisted of modifying the weapons in the mount in the truck bed, with a new set up being made standard. This new set up consisted of a 20mm m/40B Automatic Cannon mounted alongside an 8mm m/36 Machine gun in a coaxial configuration. No changes to the machine gun mounted in the vehicle's cab were made.

== Crew ==
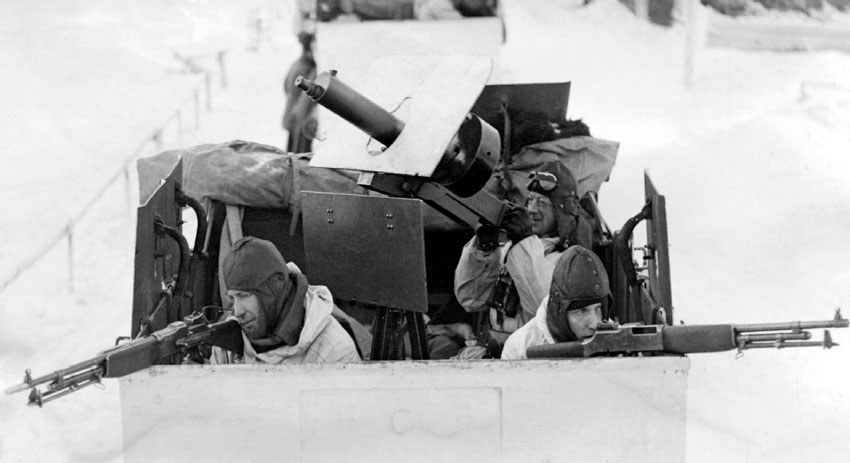
The bed of a Pbil m/31 "Machine gun car". The soldiers are carrying 6.5 mm m/21 Automatic Rifles.

The crew of the vehicle (of any type) consisted of 5 to 6 people. Broken down further the crew consisted of a driver and machine gunner that sat in the cab alongside a vehicle commander and 2 to 3 supporting soldiers in the bed of the vehicle.

== Operation ==
Driving of the vehicle was quite easy as the vehicles retained their controls from the unarmored versions of the vehicles used in production. The driver was also assisted by an odd system in the form of dial like wheel placed in front of their position that was controlled by a crew member in the bed through a pully system within the vehicle. This system was used to give the driver instructions as to which direction to turn the vehicle while reversing, as backwards visibility for the driver was non-existent.

Firing of the weapons mounted in the truck bed could either be carried out by a supporting soldier or by the vehicle commander.

The supporting soldiers used the weapon they were issued with by the army to provide support for the vehicle, this was aided by a set of detachable shields with firing ports that could be mounted to the sides of the truck bed in special structures built onto the side of the truck. These were used to shield the supporting soldiers from incoming fire in combat. These shields could also be used by the supporting soldiers outside the vehicle if needed as they could be completely dethatched from the vehicle. These mounted shields were rifle shields made in relation to the trench warfare seen in World War 1 and had been mass-produced, but with the revelations brought upon by the start of 2nd World War they were deemed obsolete and reused for many purposes.

== Organization ==
Sources conflict but at least 30 vehicles were produced and delivered to the army. Originally these vehicles were placed within cavalry units before then being moved to special "motor brigades" in 1940. They were moved for last time during the 1943 reorganization of the Swedish Army and were given to the Pansartrupperna, the Swedish Army's tank branch.

The vehicles were split into groups of three based on their chassis (Chevrolet or Volvo), with each group containing one cannon car and two machine gun cars.

4 of these armored cars were also given to the Swedish police in Stockholm during the mid-1950s for riot control purposes but were never used.

== Variants ==
- Pbil m/31 "Machine Gun Car" – Variant equipped with two 8mm m/36 Machine guns, one in the cab and one in the mount in the vehicle's bed.
- Pbil m/31 "Cannon Car" – Variant of the "Machine Gun Car" equipped with a 37 mm marinkanon m/98B installed in the mount in the vehicle's bed.
- Pbil m/31-42 – 1942 refit of the vehicle newly equipped with a 20mm m/40B Automatic Cannon alongside an 8mm m/36 Machine gun mounted coaxially in the vehicle's bed.
