= Prästö, Åland =

Island in the municipality of Sund, Åland Islands, Finland

Prästö
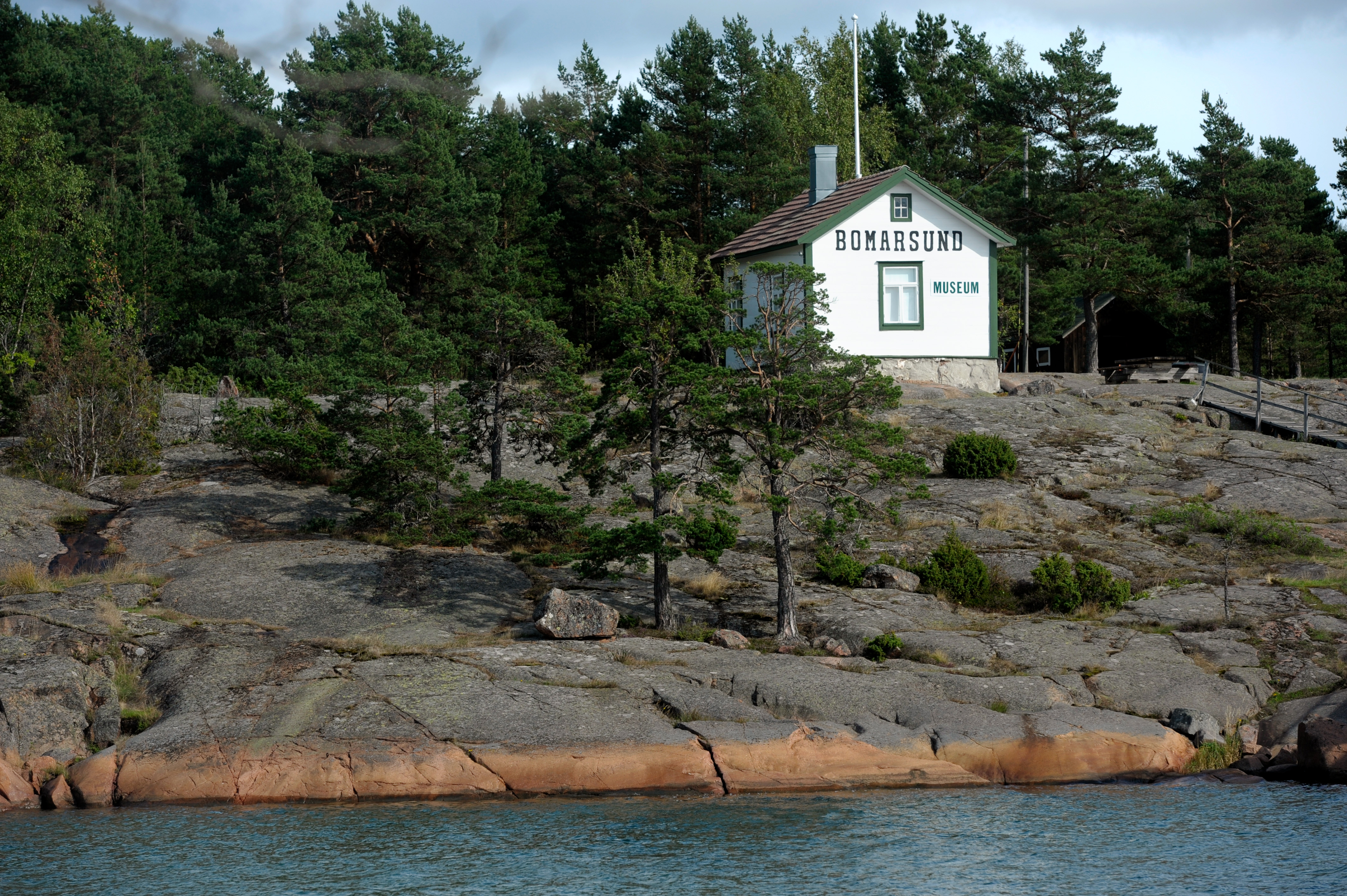
- The Bomarsund Museum in Prästö
- Interactive map of Prästö

Geography
- Location: Archipelago Sea
- Coordinates: 60°12′45″N 20°15′40″E
- Archipelago: Åland
- Area: 2.9 km^{2} (1.1 sq mi)
- Length: 2.5 km (1.55 mi)
- Width: 1.7 km (1.06 mi)
- Highest elevation: 45 m (148 ft)
- Highest point: Ängsbergen

Administration
- Finland
- County: Åland

Demographics
- Population: 94 (2016)

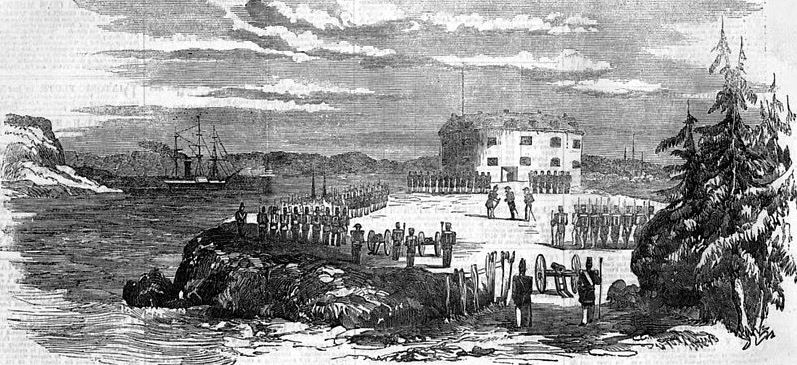
19th-century sketch of the Prästötornet surrendering to the Anglo-French troops

Prästö (lit. 'Priest Island') is an island in the municipality of Sund in Åland, Finland. It is connected to the Åland Mainland by the Bomarsund Bridge crossing the narrow Bomarsund Strait. Prästö is located next to the ruins of the Bomarsund Fortress, the place of the 1856 Crimean War Battle of Bomarsund. The island is known of its rich military history, especially of the six Russian military cemeteries established in the 19th century. Because of the graveyards, Prästö was once known as the ″Island of the Dead″.

The island hosts a campsite and two museums showing the history of Prästö and the Bomarsund Fortress.

== History ==
=== Cemeteries ===
As the Bomarsund Fortress was operating, all the deceased military and civil personnel, as well as the prisoners of war, were buried on Prästö island. The first Greek-Catholic graveyard was opened in the 1810s, as the Russian military had settled Bomarsund. It was used until 1846 and then replaced by a new cemetery which had separate sections for the Greek-Catholics, Lutherans and Roman-Catholics. As the Russian military incorporated several ethnic groups and religions, Jewish and Muslim cemeteries were established on the other side of the island. The Russians also used Turkish prisoners of war for forced labor.

All but the Lutheran graveyard were closed when the Bomarsund Fortress was demolished after the Crimean War in 1856. The graves were usually marked with simple wooden signs which today are mostly decomposed, but some 50 gravestones still exist. Most of them are for Catholics; the six gravestones remain in the Jewish cemetery, but the Muslim cemetery has none.

=== Prästötornet ===
The Prastötornet Tower was a roundel built to the northernmost tip of the Cape Barsnöudden as a part of the fortifications of the Bomarsund Fortress. The tower was 12 meters high and 42 meters in width. During the Battle of Bomarsund it was occupied by 140 men, under the command of the French-born lieutenant Chatelain who served in the Russian Imperial Army. On 16 August 1856, the Prastötornet surrendered to the British and French troops and was demolished with 6 tons of powder.

=== Military hospital ===
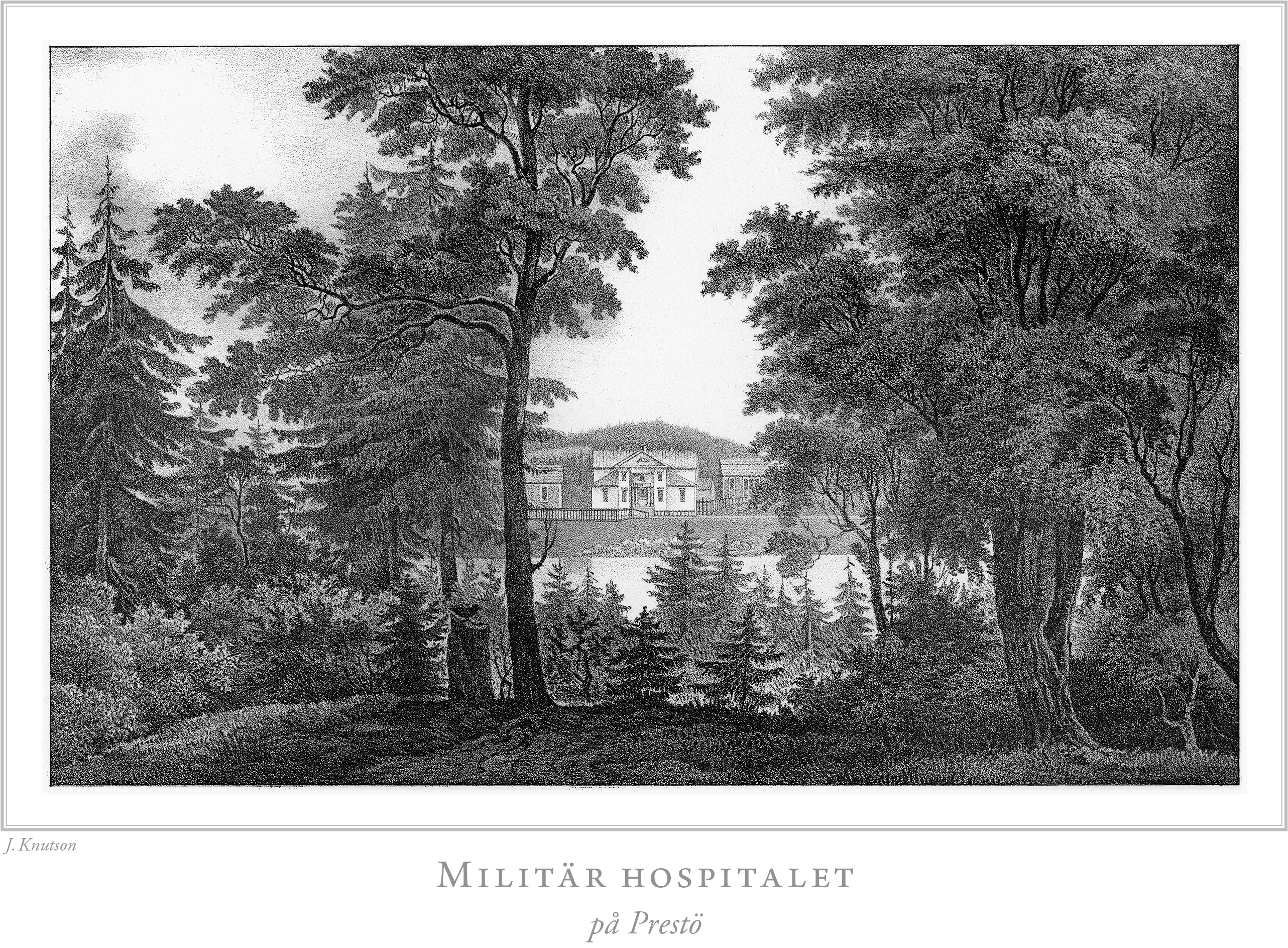
The military hospital illustrated in Finland framstäldt i teckningar published 1845–1852.

As the Åland Islands became a part of the Russian Empire in 1809, the islands were soon occupied by Russian military. A military hospital was established in Prästö in the early 1810s. As the construction of the Bomarsund Fortress started in 1829, the hospital was soon surrounded by several other buildings, forming a small village. The hospital operated until the fall of the Bomarsund Fortress in 1854, and was then burned down together with the nearby houses.

=== Telegraph station ===
In 1906, a unit of 750 Russian soldiers was sent to Prästö, although the Åland Islands had been demilitarized since the 1856 Treaty of Paris. The islands were used for smuggling weapons and illegal publications to the Socialist revolutionaries in Russia. The smuggling route ran from Stockholm to Åland and then via Southern Finland to Saint Petersburg. In order to chase the smugglers, the Russians with help from Kaj Himberg built a telegraph line from Åland to the Finnish mainland. One of the telegraph stations was built in Prästö. During the 1918 Finnish Civil War Invasion of Åland, the Prästö telegraph station was occupied by Whites who had landed the island from Finland. Today the 1913 built telegraph station works as museum which is open during the tourist season.
