= Invasion of Åland =

Swedish/German Invasion of the Åland Islands

- Part of the Finnish Civil War, Eastern Front of World War I and the Russian Civil War
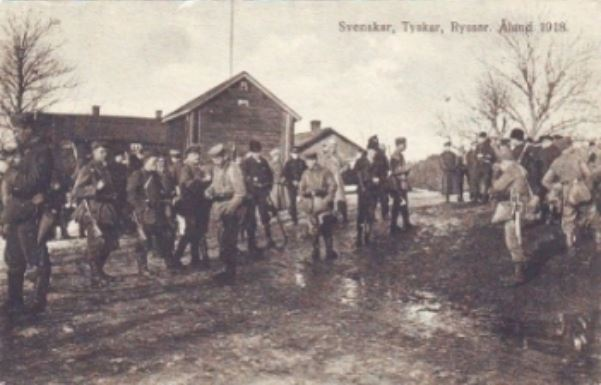
- Swedish, German and Soviet soldiers in Önningsby, Åland
| Date | 15 February – September 1918 |
| Location | Åland, Finland |
| Result | Germans and Swedes leave Åland; 1919 Ålandic status referendum; Åland Islands dispute |

Belligerents
| Soviet Russia: (Russian Socialist Federative Soviet Republic) Central Committee of the Baltic Fleet; Finnish Reds | Sweden | Central Powers: Germany; Finnish Whites |

Commanders and leaders
| (Russian Socialist Federative Soviet Republic) Davidov (Russian Socialist Federative Soviet Republic) Vatslav Vorovsky; Harry Borg †; George Boldt; William Lundberg; Johan Kock | (Sweden) Gustav V (Sweden) C. A. Ehrensvärd (Sweden) G. E. Ros (Sweden) Erik Palmstierna (Sweden) Johannes Hellner | (German Empire) Rüdiger von der Goltz (German Empire) Hugo Meurer (German Empire) August Schenck zu Schweinsberg (German Empire) R. Hess; C. G. E. Mannerheim; Pehr Evind Svinhufvud; Hjalmar von Bonsdorff; Johan Fabritius |

Strength
| 2,000 Russians; 150 Reds | 700–800 | 900–1,360 Germans; 460-600 Whites |

Casualties and losses
| 46 killed | 1 dead due to suicide | 13 Germans dead 6 Whites killed |

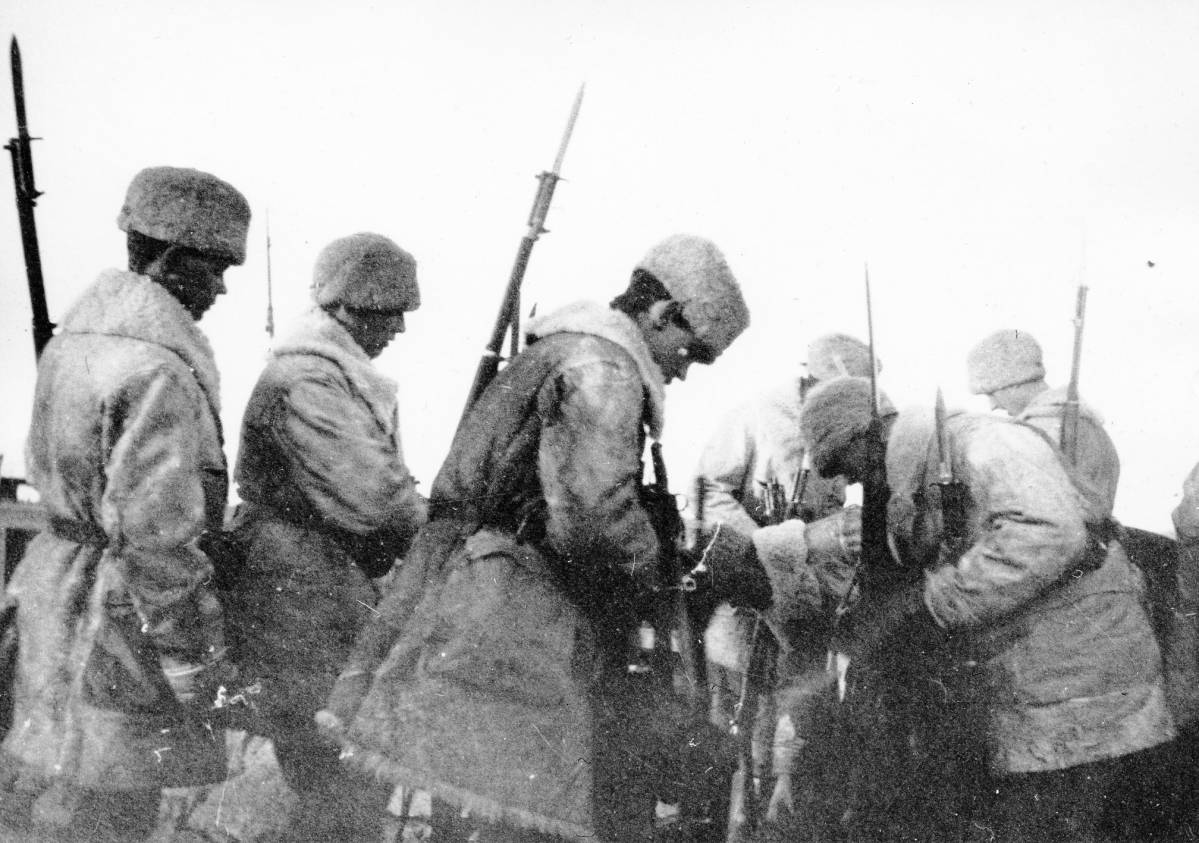
Swedish troops disarming the Soviets in Degerby village

The Invasion of Åland was a 1918 military campaign of World War I in Åland, Finland. The islands, still hosting Soviet Russian troops, were first invaded by Sweden in late February and then by the German Empire in early March. The conflict was also related to the Finnish Civil War including minor fighting between the Finnish Whites and the Finnish Reds.

As Germany took control over Åland in March 1918, Russian troops were captured and the Swedish troops left the islands by the end of the Finnish Civil War in May. The Germans stayed in Åland until September 1918. The Åland Islands dispute was then turned over to the Paris Peace Conference in 1919 and the League of Nations in 1920. The Åland convention was finally signed in 1921 re-establishing the demilitarised status of Åland as an autonomous part of Finland.

== Background ==
The Åland Islands are located in the northern Baltic Sea between Sweden and Finland. The population is Swedish-speaking, but after the 1809 Treaty of Fredrikshamn the islands were ceded to the Russian Empire together with a vast majority of the Finnish-speaking areas of Sweden, becoming the Grand Duchy of Finland, an autonomous part of the Russian Empire. In the 1856 Treaty of Paris, settling the Crimean War, the Åland Islands were demilitarised. As World War I broke out in 1914, the Russian Empire turned the islands into a submarine base for the use of British and Russian navies. Some time in 1915 the Russians destroyed Lågskär lighthouse to prevent the Germans from using it as a landmark. In 1915-16 the Germans had already made plans and were training to land on Åland. On the night of 25 and 26 July 1916 at 23:30 the German airship LZ 58 (naval designation L 25) attacked the port of Mariehamn. 8 explosive bombs were dropped on the boats of the Russian 5th submarine squadron. One of the bombs dropped on the quay next to the submarine mothership Svjatitel Nikolai, and Salo, resulting in the death of 7 Russian sailors and a horse.

The Russian government also started building fortifications, in agreement with their allies France and Great Britain, in order to prevent the German invasion. Åland Islands were fortified with 10 coastal artillery batteries, several garrisons, docks, and three airfields. The coastal batteries were at Sålis, Kungsö, Frebbenby, Mellantorp, Korsö, Herrö, Storklobb, Kökar, Hamnö-Saggö and Boxö. The cannons were 105 mm-215 mm, the batteries had open or blasted into the rock concrete bunkers with other equipment. The batteries also sometimes had loading docks, rails for transport, power plants for headlights and other types of equipment. The air fields where at Granboda, Föglö, with support stations at Torpvik, Eckerö and Gersbäck, Saltvik. There were also several coast guard stations and the docks were used for torpedo boats, submarines and more. There were telegraph stations at Prästö, Lotsberget and Lemland, there were also many radio posts around Åland. There were also 24,000 meters of barbed wire and 6,500 meters of trenches, there were also about 1,893 mines placed around Åland. There were also several areas with towed artillery, for example Ingby. With a total of 7,000-8,000 Russian soldiers. Sweden, however, considered the structures too heavy for just defending the islands. The government feared a possible attack from Åland, and so the neutral Sweden felt pressured to join the Allied Powers. It did not however do so.

== Outbreak of the Finnish Civil War ==
As Finland gained its independence from Russia in December 1917, a movement was launched in Åland to join the islands to Sweden. The Swedish government had an audience with a delegation from Åland who wanted annexation by Sweden. After the Finnish Civil War started in late January 1918, the Swedish foreign minister Johannes Hellner and the king Gustaf V had an audience with a delegation from Åland on 8 February. According to the delegation, a referendum had been held in Åland and a vast majority of 95% was willing to join Sweden. The delegation called for action on the cause and asked help from the Swedish government against the alleged arbitrary and disorder of the Russian troops. The Swedish newspapers also pressed for action for humanitarian reasons. Since the beginning of the war, the government had already evacuated more than 1,000 Swedish citizens from the Finnish mainland via the west coast town of Pori.

The Finnish Civil War expanded to Åland on 10 February, as a squad of 460 White Guard members, led by the captain Johan Fabritius from the Vakka-Suomi region, landed on the islands. The group had fled three days earlier from the town of Uusikaupunki and crossed the ice of the Archipelago Sea. After reaching Åland, the Whites had some minor clashes with troops supporting Lenin's Russian Government. On 12 February they took Sottunga telephone exchange, capturing 4 Russians. On 14 February, they took the Prästö telegraph station in Sund, capturing 20 Russian soldiers. The Russians, however, were not much interested in resistance. They were mostly waiting to return home.

== The Swedish invasion ==
On 13 February, Swedish government finally decided to send troops to Åland. The driving force of the Swedish Åland politics was the Social Democratic Minister for Naval Affairs Erik Palmstierna, who was a retired naval officer. Two days later, a naval detachment of the icebreaker Isbrytaren I, the coastal defense ship HSwMS Thor and the troopship SS Runeberg docked at Eckerö in the Swedish side of the islands. A small military unit landed in Åland in order to protect the people from alleged misconduct of the Russian troops as well as from the violent threat of the Finnish sides of the Civil War. The Whites incorrectly assumed the Swedes had come to join them. Encouraged by this, the Whites took the artillery batteries in Boxö and Saggö, but instead of supporting them, the Swedes started negotiations with the Russians.

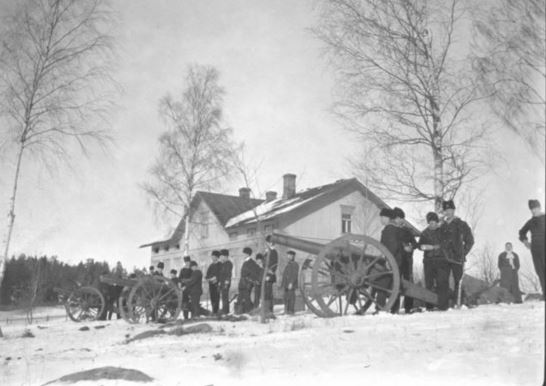
Swedish artillerymen in Haraldsby with captured Soviet cannons

The negotiation was stopped on 17 February, as 150-men Red Guard unit from Turku arrived in Åland with the icebreaker Murtaja. Their intention was to help the Russians in the presumed fight against the Swedes and the Whites. On the same day, the Whites attacked and took the village of Godby in Finström and Gölby in Jomala, but the Soviets troops were able to keep the village of Gölby and the artillery fort of Sålis. Two days later, the Reds made a counterattack against Godby but were pushed back. The Battles of Godby ended with 2 killed Whites and 3 killed Reds (one of which died in a Swedish ambush at Finström). 8 captured Reds were later executed. It remained the only Finnish Civil War battle fought in Åland.

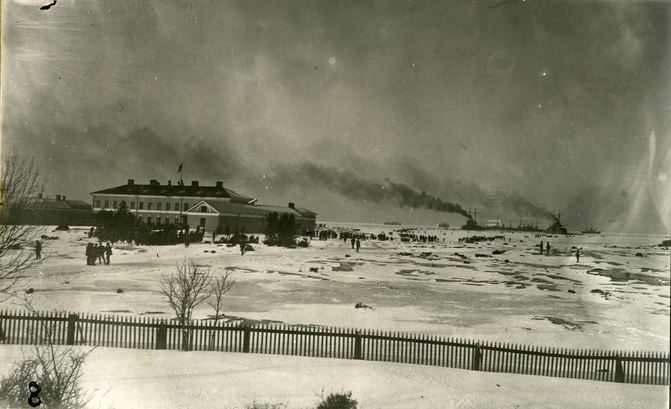
German troops landing by the Eckerö Mail and Customs House

As the situation in Åland had now escalated to open violence, the Swedes intervened in the situation with a counterfeit order by the White Army commander C. G. E. Mannerheim calling the Whites to retreat from Åland. In reality, General Mannerheim wanted the Whites to take control of all the islands and then launch an offensive against Turku, the Red capital of Southwest Finland. As the Whites did not know Mannerheim's real intentions, they followed the false order and left Åland on 20 February. As White Finland learned of the Swedish actions, they issued a strict objection. The Swedish government now had to convince others that their purpose was not to annex the islands, but only to protect the Swedish-speaking people of Åland.

On 19 February, HSwMS Sverige and Oscar II carrying a company from the Vaxholm Coastal Artillery Regiment arrived at Åland to press the Soviets in leaving the islands. The Central Committee of the Baltic Fleet still tried to avoid the armed conflict and on 22 February the political representative Vatslav Vorovsky stated the Soviets troops were willing to leave Åland. The order of disarmament was given a day after and the Finnish icebreaker Murtaja took 300 Russian Bolsheviks and the Finnish Red Guard fighters to Turku. On 24 February, the 500-man battalion of the Royal Göta Life Guards, commanded by Lieutenant Colonel G. E. Ros, landed at Eckerö, and on 27 February, the Swedes took control of Mariehamn, the capital of Åland, . By the 2 March, the Swedes controlled all the islands, although there were still up to 1,200 disarmed Russian soldiers present.

== The German invasion ==
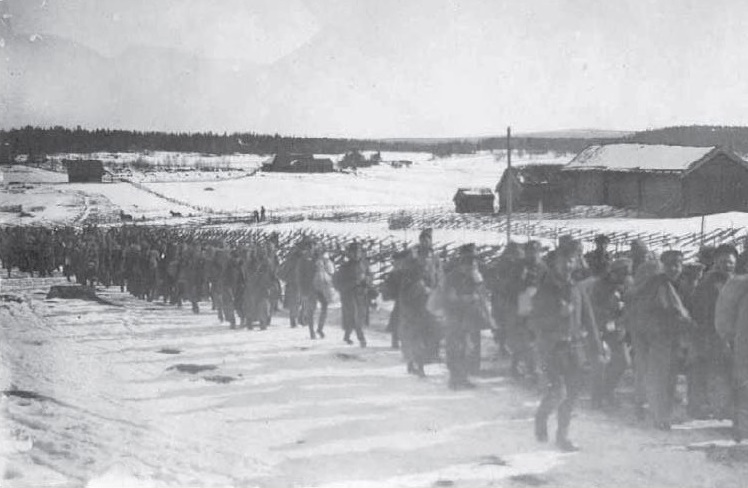
Captured Soviets are escorted to Eckerö

The armistice between Russia and Germany lapsed on 18 February 1918 and the Operation Faustschlag was soon launched by the Germans. This included the invasion of Åland, as the Germans did not know whether Sweden would remain neutral or join the Allies. The Germans had their interests in Finland because of the access to the Arctic Sea and the country's presence near the Murmansk railway and the Bolshevik capital of Saint Petersburg. To justify the invasion, Germany ordered a request of military assistance from their allies in Finland. The White Senate message requesting the German invasion of Åland reached Berlin on 22 February. The German intention was to gather troops to Åland and then land the Finnish mainland in the west coast town of Rauma. As the ice in the Bothnian Bay was too thick, the landing was finally made in Hanko, Southern Finland, by the Baltic Sea Division in the first days of April.

On 28 February, a naval unit of the dreadnought battleships Westfalen and Rheinland and the troopship Giessen, commanded by the admiral Hugo Meurer, left Danzig to Åland. The ships were carrying the Großherzoglich Mecklenburgisches Jäger-Bataillon Nr. 14, under the command of the major August Schenck zu Schweinsberg. The convoy was slowed down by the heavy ice, but finally the Aalands-Detachement reached Eckerö on 5 March. The following day, the Swedes were forced to make a deal with the Germans. According to the agreement, Sweden and Germany now shared the Åland Islands. The Swedes had a hold on the capital Mariehamn and the villages of Jomala, Geta and Finström. Both were allowed to use the port of Eckerö. A post of the Finnish military governor was established and filled by the naval officer Hjalmar von Bonsdorff as the representative of the White Senate.

The Germans captured up to 1,000–1,200 Soviet soldiers which were shipped to Liepāja. 250 Ukrainian, Polish, Latvian and Estonian soldiers of the Soviet army were placed to an internment camp in Sweden. These soldiers were later handed over to Germans and transported to Sassnitz in Northern Germany. In Mariehamn, the Germans took several Russian warships and the Finnish steamer SS Baltic.

On 10 March, the Finnish Reds proposed negotiations with the Germans over their potential threat against Turku, the Red capital of Southwest Finland. The Germans agreed to meet the Red delegation in Åland if they would bring the POWs kept in Turku. In 1918 the Russians exchanged more than 65,000 wounded and invalid German POWs via Finland. The Red delegation including the socialist philosopher Georg Boldt and the Turku militia leader William Lundberg, together with 260 POWs, travelled across the ice by horse-drawn sleigh. On 15 March, Boldt and Lundberg had a meeting with the Germans. However, the Reds were told that since the Germans were invited by the Whites, they could not discuss their intentions. Boldt and Lundberg were then escorted back to the mainland.

In late March, the Germans launched a campaign in the Turku archipelago to secure the left wing of the forthcoming Baltic Sea Division landing in Hanko. The plan was to reach Turku from Åland via the islands of Houtskär, Korpo, Nagu and Pargas. Houtskär was taken by the Finnish Whites on 25 March and Korpo on 28 March, but the Reds stopped the German troops in the Battle of Nagu on 4 April. The Germans then left the archipelago and focused on the march from Hanko to Helsinki.

== Aftermath ==
Sweden pulled most of its troops from Åland on 14 March, but the ship Oscar II and one small military unit stayed until the end of the Finnish Civil War. The last Swedes retreated on 26 May 1918. The Germans stayed in the Åland Islands until September 1918. After the war, Sweden was still willing to take the Åland Islands and wanted to solve the dispute in the Treaty of Versailles, but the question was not included. A new referendum was held in 1919 and now 9,900 of the 10,000 voters wanted to join Sweden. A year later, Great Britain took the case to the newly founded League of Nations. In June 1921, Åland was declared as a demilitarised and autonomous territory of Finland.

== Casualties ==
During their seven-month military campaign in Åland, the Germans lost six men. Three of them were killed on 9 March as the icebreaker Hindenburg struck a mine off Eckerö and sank. Two sailors drowned on 11 April when Rheinland grounded between the islands of Lågskär and Flötjan. Rheinland was later re-floated in July, but she had been badly damaged in the grounding, and the German naval command determined that she was not worth repairing. In addition to the casualties in Åland, seven Germans were killed in the Battle of Nagu in the Turku Archipelago.

There was one Swedish soldier who died. He was an infantry sergeant who committed suicide in April. Three Whites were killed in the Battle of Godby, two in the Battle of Korpo and one in the Battle of Nagu.

The number of Russian Bolshevik soldiers killed is not clear but at least two soldiers died in the clashes with the Finnish Whites. One Soviet and one Finnish Red were shot by the Whites in late March when they were captured near the island of Vårdö. The order was given by the Finnish military governor Hjalmar von Bonsdorff and the execution was carried out by the Whites occupying the Turku Archipelago. In addition to the 3 Reds killed in the Battle of Godby, 8 captured Reds were shot by the Whites in the ice of Färjsundet Strait. At least 26 also died in the Battle of Nagu and 7 in the Battle of Korpo.

== See also ==
- Riga expedition (1905)
- Swedish intervention in Persia
- World War I
- Finnish Civil War
