= Ulvön Island =

Coordinates: 63°1′19″N 18°38′59″E

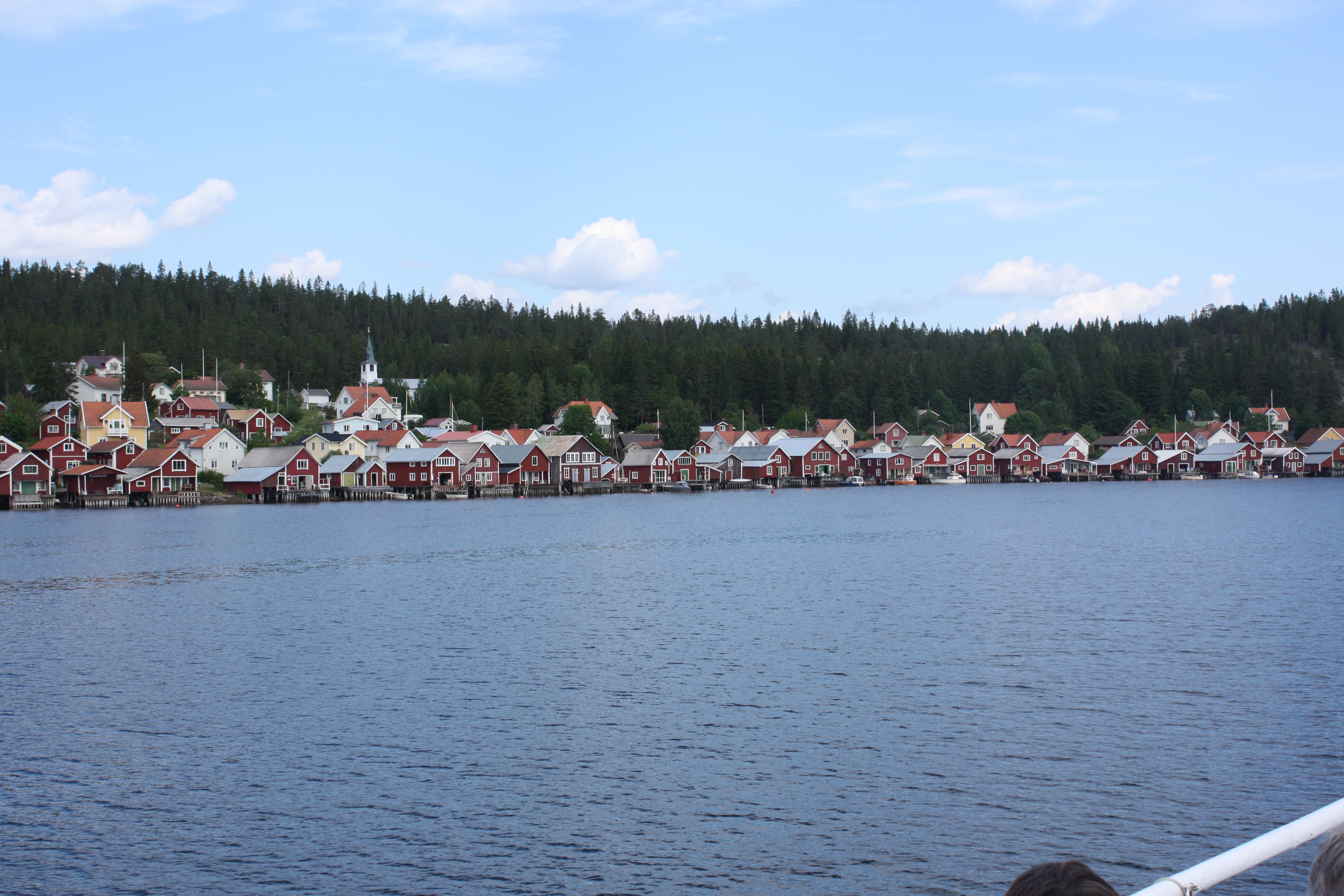
Ulvön

Ulvön Island is an island in The High Coast of the Sweden archipelago in the Gulf of Bothnia. Ulvön is the largest island in the archipelago and the most populous. There is a South Ulvön Island as well as the main Ulvön Island .

The island of Ulvön has been a major fishing island since the mid part of the 16th century. It was established as a fishery by fishermen coming from Gävle for the Baltic herring. Today fishing is a major part of the economy of Ulvön Island but tourism has become increasingly important in the 21st century, with visitor numbers increasing steadily.
