= HSwMS Psilander (1899) =

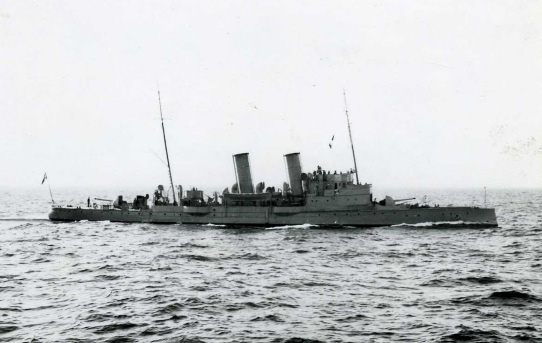
- Psilander

History

Sweden
- Name: Psilander
- Launched: 25 November 1899
- Commissioned: 20 July 1900
- Decommissioned: 1 July 1937
- Fate: Expended as a target, 1939

General characteristics
- Type: Torpedo cruiser
- Displacement: 800 long tons (810 t)
- Length: 70.71 m (232 ft)
- Beam: 8.3 m (27 ft 3 in)
- Draught: 3 m (9 ft 10 in)
- Speed: 20 knots (37 km/h; 23 mph)
- Complement: 99
- Armament: 2 × 120 mm (4.7 in) guns; 4 × 57 mm (2.2 in) guns; 1 × 38 cm (15 in) torpedo tube

HSwMS Psilander was a Örnen-class torpedo cruiser built for the Swedish Navy during the 1890s, named after the 17th-century admiral Gustaf von Psilander. She was commissioned on 20 July 1900. From 1927 until 1937 she was used for cadet training, and was sunk after being used as an artillery target on 3 August 1939.

== Description ==
Psilander had an overall length of 70.71 metres (232 ft), a beam of 8.3 metres (27 ft 3 in) and a draught of 3 metres (9 ft 10 in) at deep load. The ship displaced about 800 long tons (810 t) at normal load. The steam engines were rated at 4,500 indicated horsepower (3,400 kW) which gave her a speed of 20 knots (37 km/h; 23 mph). Psilander carried up to 100 long tons (100 t) of coal and had a complement of 99 officers and ratings.

== Bibliography ==
- Roberts, John (1979). "Sweden". In Chesneau, Roger & Kolesnik, Eugene M. (eds.). Conway's All the World's Fighting Ships 1860–1905. Greenwich: Conway Maritime Press. pp. 360–363. ISBN 0-8317-0302-4.
