= Bofors 20 mm automatic gun L/70 =

Bofors 20 mm automatic gun L/70 20 mm automatkanon m/40
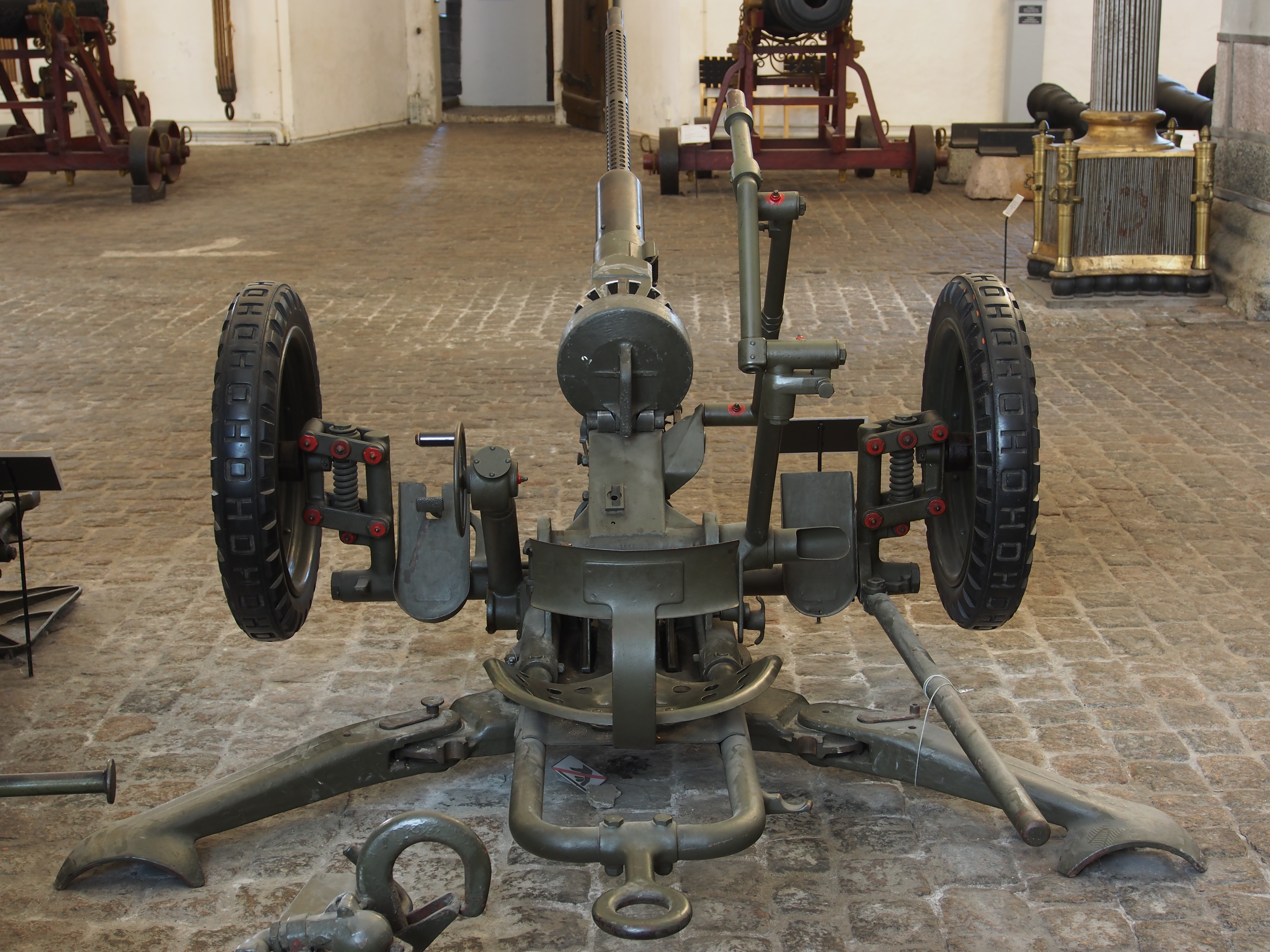
- Danish version in the Royal Danish Arsenal Museum
- Type: Autocannon
- Place of origin: Sweden

Service history
- Used by: Sweden, Denmark
- Wars: World War II

Production history
- Designer: Bofors
- Manufacturer: Bofors

Specifications
- Mass: 42 kg
- Cartridge: 20×145R
- Cartridge weight: 0.29-0.3 kg
- Caliber: 20 mm
- Action: Long Recoil
- Rate of fire: 360 rpm
- Muzzle velocity: 815-845 m/s
- Maximum firing range: 5 km
- Feed system: 25 round magazine

Bofors 20 mm automatic gun L/70 (Swedish military designation: 20 mm automatkanon m/40, 20 mm akan m/40, lit. '20 mm autocannon m/40') is a Swedish 20 mm calibre autocannon, constructed by Bofors during the latter 1930s. The weapon was intended for both anti-tank and anti-aircraft use.

== History ==
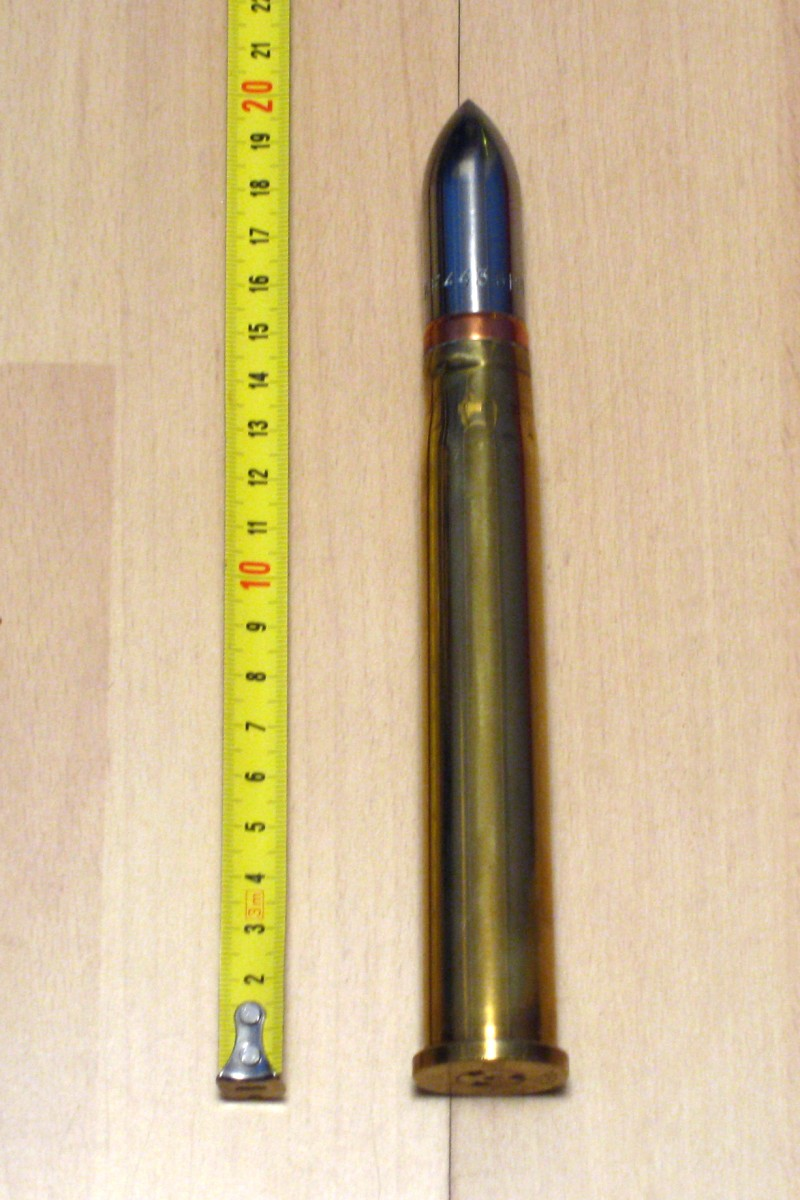
A 20×145mmR cartridge, as would be used in the m/40, tape measure in centimeters for scale

The 20 mm m/40 followed the same pattern of long-recoil operation as the 25 mm and 40 mm guns. It was chambered for a unique and quite powerful 20×145R cartridge, and could fire at 360 rpm. On a wheeled AA mounting, it weighed 300 kg, on a low tripod for anti-tank use, it weighed 65 kg (the same gun was used in both installations, and could be switched between mountings). In anti-tank form, it was given the nickname "grasshopper" as it jumped about so much on firing. It was known as the pansarvärnsluftvärnskanon m/40 (PVLV) which translates as 'anti-tank-anti-aircraft gun'. The ammunition feed consisted of an exposed 25-round rotary magazine above the gun, which in the AT mounting meant that the sights had to be fixed to the side. It appears that these weapons were only used by the Swedish Army and Navy, with some 2,700 guns being produced. It was also fitted to about forty Pbil m/31 armoured cars and to fixed AA and "combination" mountings.

== Operators ==
- Denmark
- Sweden
