= HSwMS Oden =

Swedish coastal defence ship

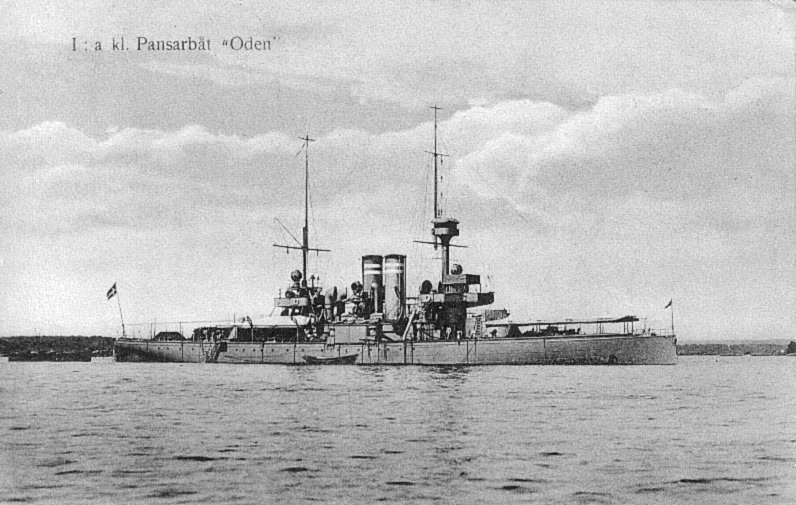
- Oden

History

Sweden
- Name: Oden
- Namesake: Oden
- Builder: Bergsund Finnboda shipyard, Stockholm
- Cost: SEK 3,194,000
- Laid down: 1894
- Launched: 9 March 1896
- Commissioned: 8 June 1897
- Out of service: 16 July 1937
- Fate: Broken up, 1943

General characteristics (as built)
- Class & type: Oden-class coastal defence ship
- Displacement: 3,600 t (3,500 long tons) (normal)
- Length: 84.78 m (278 ft 2 in) (w.l.)
- Beam: 14.77 m (48 ft 5 in)
- Draught: 5.6 m (18 ft 4 in) (max)
- Installed power: 6 marine boilers; 5,330 ihp (3,970 kW)
- Propulsion: 2 × triple-expansion steam engines; 2 × screws
- Speed: 15 knots (28 km/h; 17 mph)
- Range: 2,500 nmi (4,600 km; 2,900 mi) at 10 knots (19 km/h; 12 mph)
- Complement: 239
- Armament: 2 × single 25 cm (10 in) guns; 4 × single 12 cm (4.7 in) guns; 4 × single 5.7 cm (2.2 in) guns; 4 × single 8 mm (0.3 in) guns; 1 × single 45.0 cm (17.7 in) torpedo tube
- Armour: Belt: 243 mm (9.6 in); Barbette: 247 mm (9.7 in); Turrets: 200 mm (7.9 in); Deck: 49 mm (2 in); Conning tower: 247 mm (9.7 in)

HSwMS Oden (Note: "HSwMS" here stands for "Hans/Hennes Majestäts Skepp") was the lead ship of the Oden class of first-class coastal defence ships (Pansarskeppen) constructed for the Swedish Navy. The ship was armed with two 25 cm (9.8 in) guns provided by the French manufacturer Société Nouvelle des Forges et Chantiers de la Méditerranée. The vessel was launched in 1896 and was first upgraded with additional 12 cm (4.7 in) guns after running aground in 1901. In 1913, the warship accidentally sank the gunboat Urd and was taken out of service the following year to be updated with new boilers and an upgraded armament. Most noticeably, during this rebuild, one funnel was fitted to replace the two that had been a feature of the ship from the start. Oden was retired from front-line service in 1937 and broken up in 1943.

== Design and development ==
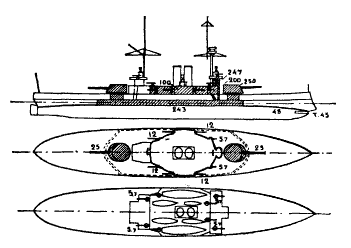
Plan of Oden from Nordisk familjebok

Oden was the lead of the Oden-class coastal defence ships, a development of the earlier Svea class mounting the same primary armament on a larger hull. Although the subsequent Niord and Thor differed in details, the three vessels are considered members of the same class. As all the vessels were named after characters in Norse mythology, the ships are also knowns as the mythological class.

Oden had an overall length of 86.3 m (283 ft 2 in) and measured 84.78 m (278 ft 2 in) at the waterline, a beam of 14.77 m (48 ft 5 in) and a maximum draught of 5.6 m (18 ft 4 in). Displacement was 3,600 tonnes (3,500 long tons) normal and 3,775 tonnes (3,715 long tons) full load. Power was provided by six cylinder boilers feeding steam to two sets of triple-expansion steam engines and rated at 5,330 indicated horsepower (3,970 kW) driving two shafts, giving a design speed of 15 knots (28 km/h; 17 mph). During sea trials, on 25 May 1897, Oden achieved a speed of 15.54 knots (28.78 km/h; 17.88 mph) from 3,887.67 indicated horsepower (2,899.04 kW) and, on 25 September, while operating with a forced draft, the vessel achieved 16.82 knots (31.15 km/h; 19.36 mph). Two funnels were fitted. The ship had a complement of 239 officers and ratings. A full load of 280 long tons (280 t) of coal was carried, which gave a design range of 2,500 nautical miles (4,600 km; 2,900 mi) at 10 knots (19 km/h; 12 mph). After reconstruction in 1915, coal capacity was expanded to 300 long tons (300 t), which gave a design range of 2,530 nautical miles (4,690 km; 2,910 mi) at 10 knots (19 km/h; 12 mph) and the complement increased to 254 officers and ratings.

Armament consisted of two single Canet 25 cm (9.8 in) M1894 B guns mounted in turrets on the ship's centreline, one fore and the other aft. Each of the guns weighed 27.715 long tons (28.160 t). The guns had an actual calibre of 25.4 cm (10.0 in) and were manufactured by Société Nouvelle des Forges et Chantiers de la Méditerranée in France as the capacity did not exist in Sweden to manufacture weapons of this size. They could fire a 200 kg (450 lb) shell at a muzzle velocity of 720 m/s (2,362 ft/s). The mounting, designated M1894, used electric training and manual elevation. Secondary armament initially consisted of four Bofors 12 cm (4.7 in) guns mounted singularly in casemates amidships that could fire from 3 to 8 shots a minute at a muzzle velocity of 740 m/s (2,400 ft/s). The ship was also armed with four single Bofors 5.7 cm (2.2 in) guns in casemates and two 8 mm (0.3 in) were mounted on the fighting mast. A single 25 mm (1.0 in) machine gun was carried by each of the two steam sloops carried. A single submerged 45 cm (17.7 in) torpedo tube was mounted in the bow. Four 90 cm (35 in) searchlights were carried.

Armour included an armoured belt that was 243 mm (9.6 in) thick and 1.48 m (4 ft 10.3 in) high. The main armament was protected by barbettes that were 247 mm (9.7 in) thick and turrets 200 mm (7.9 in) thick with a roof 30 mm (1.2 in) thick. The secondary armament sat on barbettes protected by 100 mm (3.9 in) armour, the turrets having a face 125 mm (4.9 in) thick, sides 60 mm (2.4 in) thick and a roof 48 mm (1.9 in) thick. The armour on the casemates was 91 mm (3.6 in) thick. The conning tower was protected by 247 mm (9.7 in) armour while armour that was 49 mm (1.9 in) thick protected the deck and the rooms housing the steering gear and torpedoes. The thickest armour was provided by Schneider-Creusot while the remainder came from Bofors. The nickel-steel was produced by Domnarvet.

== Construction and career ==
Oden, named after the Norse god, was ordered from the Bergsund Finnboda shipyard in Stockholm and named on 6 October 1894 and laid down in the same year. The design was altered on 11 October 1895 when the stern fighting mast was replaced by a wooden beam with a signalling mast. Launched on 9 March 1896, the ship was exhibited at the General Exhibition of Art and Industry in Stockholm the following year before being commissioned on 8 June 1897. The total cost of the construction was SEK 3,194,000. On 11 August 1898, the vessel led a flotilla of ships that also included the coastal defence ships Svea and Thule to Copenhagen. While there, the flotilla hosted Christian IX, Crown Prince Frederick, Prince George of Greece and other royalty, returning to Karlskrona on 19 August.

While taking part in exercises near Sandhamn on 17 September 1901 with other vessels of the Swedish Navy, Oden ran aground. Swift action from the crew of sister ship Thor, which was following, narrowly avoided a collusion. Despite that, damage to the ship's hull and torpedo tubes led to Oden returning to Stockholm for repairs. On 6 December, funds were released to also upgrade the vessel's armament at the same time as the repairs were completed, with an additional pair of 12 cm (4.7 in) guns replacing two of the casemate-based 5.7 cm (2.2 in) guns and an additional four single 5.7 cm (2.2 in) guns were placed on the superstructure. The following year, the warship represented Sweden at the coronation revue for Edward VII at Spithead. Between 6 July and 30 September 1903, the ship sailed to Larvik.

On 20 February 1904, Oden was briefly activated in response to activity from the Imperial Russian Navy during the Russo-Japanese War but saw no action. Between 19 and 24 August 1906, the vessel joined sister ship Niord and other ships of the Swedish Navy to host the British Cruiser Squadron under Admiral Day Bosanquet at Gothenburg. On 22 August 1913, Oden struck the gunboat Urd while operating near Hven on manoeuvres. Urd had been acting as a target ship for the coastal defence ship to test torpedoes near to the lighthouse on Hven, but the limited range of the weapons and primitive rangefinders mounted on the larger ship had meant that the vessels had underestimated the distance between them. The gunboat sank, but no-one died.

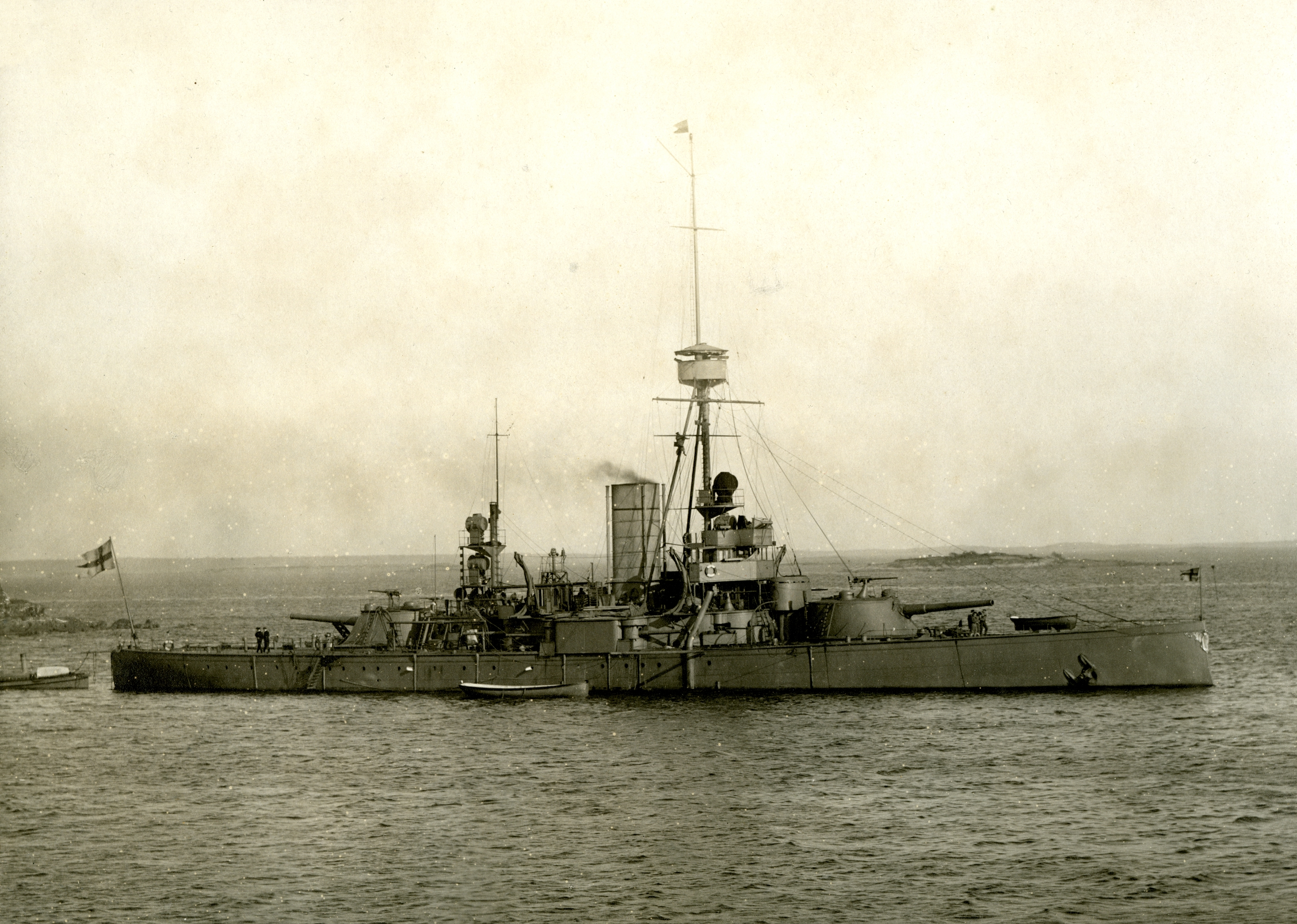
Oden after reconstruction in 1915

The ship was taken out of the service and rebuilt at Karlskrona between 1914 and 1915. The fighting mast was replaced by a much smaller three-legged mast and the two funnels were replaced by one. The remaining casemate-mounted 5.7 cm (2.2 in) guns were removed and those mounted on the superstructure upgraded. The machine guns and torpedo tubes were removed and new boilers installed, which improved performance. Oden resumed service, and briefly provided support to Sweden's neutrality in the First World War. After the Armistice of 11 November 1918, the ship was placed in reserve. Attempts the sell the vessel for scrap failed. In the 1920s, the Navy had plans to rebuild the coastal defence ship as a seaplane carrier but instead the newer Dristigheten was converted. On 16 July 1937, Oden was withdrawn from service and transferred to the Lagef, or storage area, in Karlskrona. In 1941, it was decided that the ship was no longer required. Oden was retired and broken up two years later.

== Bibliography ==
- Campbell, N J M (1979). "Sweden". In Gardiner, Robert (ed.). Conway's All the World's Fighting Ships 1860–1905. London: Conway Maritime Press. pp. 360–363. ISBN 978-0-85177-133-5.
- Fleks, Adam (1997). Od Svea Do Drottning Victoria [From Svea to Drottning Victoria] (in Polish). Tarnowskie Góry: Okręty Wojenne. ISBN 978-8-39022-748-1. OCLC 401825394.
- Friedman, Norman (2011). Naval Weapons of World War One: Guns, Torpedoes, Mines and ASW Weapons of All Nations; An Illustrated Directory. Barnsley, UK: Seaforth Publishing. ISBN 978-1-84832-100-7.
- Gard, Bertil; Becker, William A. B (1966). "Scandinavian Coast Defense Ships: Part I – Sweden". Warship International. 3 (2): 130–139. JSTOR 44885673.
- Harris, Daniel G. (1996). "The Swedish Armoured Coastal Defence Ships". Warship (XX): 9–24.
- von Hofsten, Gustaf; Waernberg, Jan; Ohlsson, Curt S. (2003). Örlogsfartyg: svenska maskindrivna fartyg under tretungad flagg [Naval vessels: Swedish Motor-driven Ships under the Tritongued Flag]. [Forum navales skriftserie], 1650-1837; [6] (in Swedish). Stockholm: Svenskt militärhistoriskt bibl. i samarbete med Marinlitteratur. ISBN 919743843X. SELIBR 8873330.
- Insulander, Per; Ohlsson, Curt S (2001). Pansarskepp: Från John Ericsson till Gustav V [Armoured ships: From John Ericsson to Gustav V] (in Swedish) (1:a ed.). Falkenberg: C B Marinlitteratur AB. ISBN 978-9-19731-872-3.
- Office of Naval Intelligence (July 1900). Notes on Naval Progress. General Information Series: Information from Abroad. Washington: Government Printing Office.
- Parkes, Oscar; Prendergast, Maurice (1969). Jane's Fighting Ships 1919. Newton Abbott: David & Charles. OCLC 907574860.
- Westerlund, Karl-Erik (1992). Svenska Örlogsfartyg 1855–1905 [Swedish Naval Ships 1855–1905] (in Swedish). Karlskrona: Abrahamson. ISBN 978-9-18707-213-0.
