= HSwMS Svea =

Swedish coastal defence ship

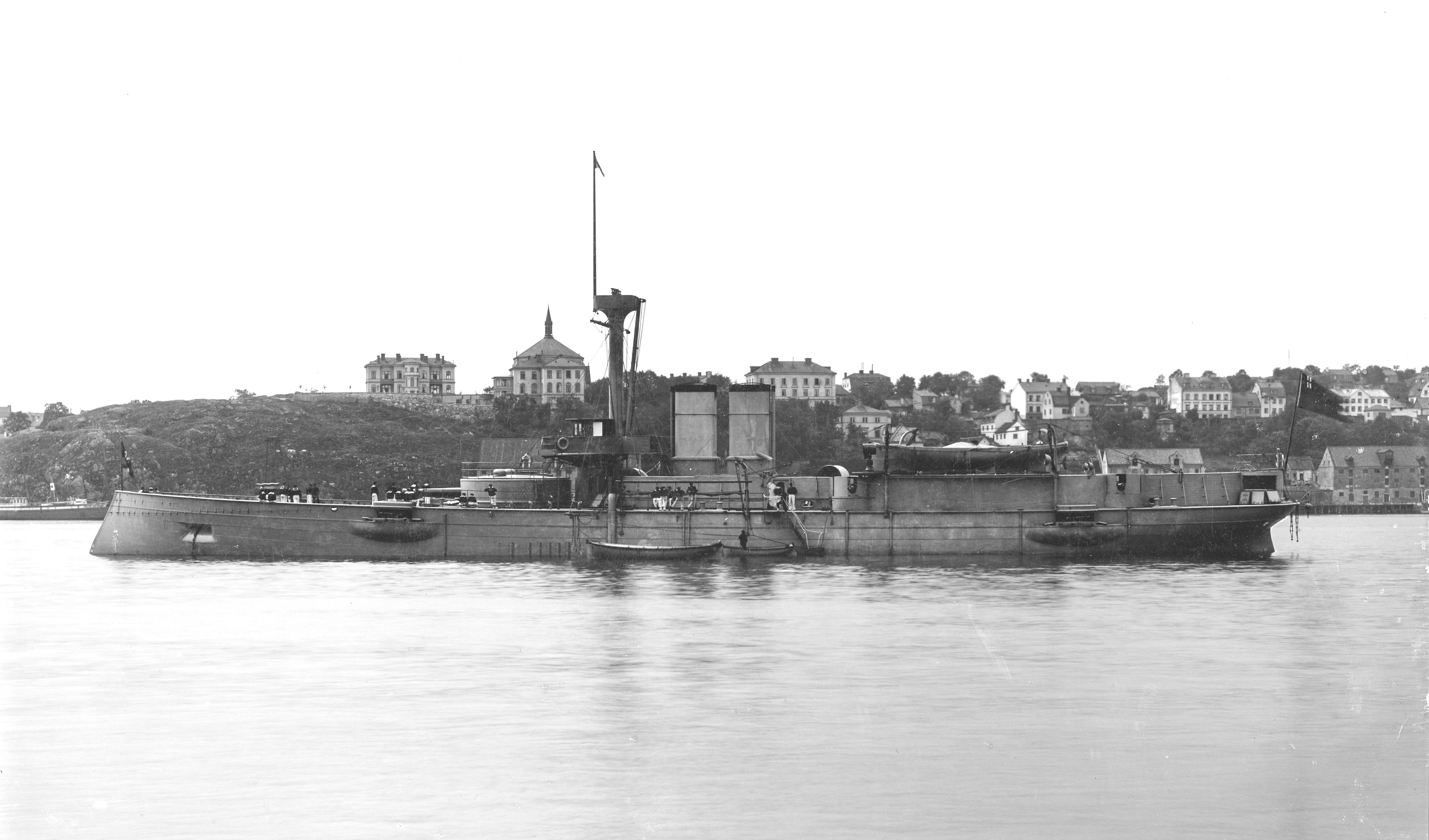
- Svea in 1887

History

Sweden
- Name: Svea
- Namesake: Svea
- Builder: Lindholmens, Gothenburg
- Cost: SEK 1,134,000
- Laid down: March 1884
- Launched: 12 December 1885
- Commissioned: 20 September 1886
- Out of service: 30 December 1941
- Fate: Broken up, 1943 and 1944

General characteristics (as built)
- Class & type: Svea-class coastal defence ship
- Displacement: 2,931 t (2,885 long tons) (normal)
- Length: 75.7 m (248 ft 4 in) (w.l.)
- Beam: 14.84 m (48 ft 8 in)
- Draught: 5.18 m (17 ft 0 in) (max)
- Installed power: 6 marine boilers; 3,100 ihp (2,300 kW)
- Propulsion: 2 × marine steam engines; 2 × screws
- Speed: 14 knots (26 km/h; 16 mph)
- Range: 800 nmi (1,500 km; 920 mi) at 12 knots (22 km/h; 14 mph)
- Complement: 252
- Armament: 2 × single 254 mm (10 in) guns; 4 × single152 mm (6.0 in) guns; 2 × single 38 mm (1.5 in) guns; 4 × single 25 mm (1.0 in) guns; 1 × single 381 mm (15 in) torpedo tube
- Armour: Belt: 147–297 mm (5.8–11.7 in); Turrets: 246–297 mm (9.7–11.7 in); Deck: 49 mm (2 in)

HSwMS Svea (Note: "HSwMS" here stands for "Hans/Hennes Majestäts Skepp") was the lead ship of the Svea class of first-class coastal defence ships (Pansarskeppen) constructed for the Swedish Navy. The ship was armed with two 254 mm (10 in) guns provided by the British manufacturer Armstrong. The vessel was launched in 1884 and was subject to a number of armament changes over a service lifespan that lasted until 1915, including, in 1903, replacing the main armament with a single Bofors 210 mm (8.3 in) gun. During the upgrades, the redundant guns often found a role in Swedish coastal defence batteries. Although available during the First World War, the warship saw no action. In 1918, the ship was recommissioned as a submarine tender, serving in this capacity until 1941, after which Svea was decommissioned and broken up.

== Design and development ==
Svea was the lead of the Svea class first-class coastal defence ships, the first vessels of the type to serve in the Swedish Navy. Designed in response to a proposal presented to the Riksdag on 26 June 1880, the new design was approved by the King of Sweden, Oscar II, on 7 December 1883 and a contract for the construction of the new ship signed with Motala Verkstad on 14 January 1884. The design followed the pattern of the Royal Navy ironclad battleship Inflexible. The boilers, engines, steering gear and torpedo room were all placed under the armoured deck and protected by coal bunkers. The hull was divided into 194 watertight compartments, including 72 in a double hull. The vessel was the first to be built of steel for the navy.

Svea had a waterline length of 75.7 m (248 ft 4 in), a beam of 14.84 m (48 ft 8 in) and a standard draught of 5.18 m (17 ft 0 in). Displacement was 2,931 tonnes (2,885 long tons) normal and 3,273 tonnes (3,221 long tons) full load. Power was provided by six cylindrical marine boilers feeding steam to two horizontal marine steam engines. Rated at 3,100 indicated horsepower (2,300 kW), they drove two shafts to give a design speed of 14 knots (26 km/h; 16 mph). During sea trials, on 8 September 1886, Svea achieved a speed of 14.68 knots (27.19 km/h; 16.89 mph), later increased to 15.9 knots (29.4 km/h; 18.3 mph) from 31,037 indicated horsepower (23,144 kW). Two funnels were fitted. A maximum load of 260 long tons (260 t) of coal could be carried, although normally the full load was 230 long tons (230 t). Coal consumption was 1.1 long tons (1.1 t) per horsepower hour at 14 knots (26 km/h; 16 mph). Range was 800 nautical miles (1,500 km; 920 mi) at 12 knots (22 km/h; 14 mph). The ship had a complement of 252 officers and ratings.

Armament consisted of two single Armstrong 254 mm (10.0 in) M84 guns mounted in turrets able to rotate 136 degrees to each side and mounted on the ship's centreline, one fore and the other aft. Each of the gun barrels weighed 29.6492 long tons (30.1250 t) and had a length of 34 calibres. They could fire a shell every five minutes at a muzzle velocity of 200 m/s (640 ft/s), giving a maximum range of 8,600 m (28,215 ft 3 in). Secondary armament initially consisted of four Armstrong 152 mm (6.0 in) guns mounted singularly aft that could fire from a shot every two minutes at a muzzle velocity of 506 m/s (1,660 ft/s). Each secondary gun had a barrel that had a length of 28 calibres and weighed 4.16 long tons (4.23 t). They had a maximum range of 5,500 m (18,044 ft 7 in). For protection against torpedo boats, the ship was armed with two 38 mm (1.5 in) M84 and four 25 mm (1.0 in) M77 Nordenfelt guns, with an additional 12 mm (0.5 in) Nordenfelt gun mounted on the top of the unrigged mast. Four extra 25 mm guns were carried to be used by landing parties. A single submerged 381 mm (15 in) torpedo tube for six torpedoes was mounted in the bow.

The ship was the first in the Swedish fleet fitted with compound armour. An armoured belt was fitted that was 297 mm (11.7 in) thick at the bow, reducing to 147 mm (5.8 in) amidships and then increasing to 222 mm (8.7 in) at the sternpost. It was mounted on a wooden batten that measured 260 mm (10.2 in) thick, increasing to 594 mm (1 ft 11.4 in) at the waterline and 891 mm (35.1 in) below it. The main turrets were protected by armour 297 mm thick at the front, 273 mm (10.7 in) on the sides and 246 mm (9.7 in) at the rear. The secondary armament sat behind shields that were 254 mm thick with a cover that was 25.4 mm (1.0 in) thick. Armour that was 49 mm (1.9 in) thick protected the deck. The armour was manufactured in Le Creusot by Schneider & Co.

== Construction and career ==
Svea, named after the personification of Sweden, was laid down in March 1884 by Lindholmens in Gothenburg and launched on 12 December 1885. The cost of the construction, without armament was SEK 1,134,000. The ship was officially commissioned on 20 September 1886.

On 1 August 1890, the ship led a training mission to visit Härnösand. Later that year, the ship's armament was upgraded with two single Bofors 5.7 cm (2.2 in) guns mounted alongside two 60 cm (24 in) searchlights that were carried on semi-circular platforms on the ship's sides. Two steam sloops were added. Between 1896 and 1897, the secondary armament was replaced by four Bofors 120 mm (4.7 in) guns. Each could fire between five and eight shells a minute at 230 m/s (740 ft/s), giving a maximum range of 8,200 m (26,902 ft 11 in). The 38 mm and 57 mm guns were also replaced by four upgraded 57 mm M/89B guns. The 152 mm guns found a second use, with two being relocated to the coastal defence battery at Karlskrona and one to the gunboat Skagul. On 11 August 1898, the upgraded vessel joined a flotilla of ships that also included the coastal defence ships Oden and Thule on a visit to Copenhagen. While there, the flotilla hosted Christian IX, Crown Prince Frederick, Prince George of Greece and other royalty, returning to Karlskrona on 19 August.

In 1899, the Riksdag authorised the modernisation of the Svea class at a cost of SEK 4,920,000. The original concept was to upgrade them to the same armament as the Äran-class coastal defence ships. The main guns were removed but it was only possible to mount a single Bofors 210 mm (8.3 in) M98 gun rather than two. The new gun fired 125 kg (276 lb) shells at a muzzle velocity of 750 metres per second (2,500 ft/s) to a range of 10,250 m (33,628 ft 7 in)at a rate of fire of one shell per minute. A new secondary armament was fitted with seven 152 mm M98 guns mounted singly in turrets, three lining each side and one aft. These weapons could fire 45 kg (100 lb) shells over 9,000 m (29,527 ft 7 in) at a muzzle velocity of 850 m/s (2,789 ft/s) and a rate of fire of 2.7 shells per minute. The new guns were mounted in lighter turrets that offered greater protection as they used compound armour. The main armament was protected by turrets that were 190 mm (7.5 in) thick and the secondary armament with armour 115 mm (4.5 in) thick. Displacement was increased to 3,300 tonnes (3,200 long tons). The ship's complement was reduced to 232 officers and ratings. Svea was taken out of service on 27 May 1903 to be modernised, returning to active duty after 22 days of work. Once the work was complete, little of the original ship remained apart from the hull and engines.

Between 24 September and 4 October 1912, the ship hosted the British Second Cruiser Squadron, led by the battlecruiser Indomitable, which was moored at Trälhavet near Vaxholm. At the start of the First World War, the Swedish Navy was mobilised and Svea was assessed for brought back into service. However, the rapid progress in marine technology meant that, on 10 April 1915, it was declared that Svea was no longer fit for an active role. The battleship was removed from service and two of the secondary guns were transferred to a coastal battery.

The decision was made on 15 February 1918 to convert the ship to a submarine tender with the remaining 152 mm guns removed, work that was complete in 1921. Displacement was decreased to 2,840 tonnes (2,800 long tons). The armament was replaced by four 120 mm M94 guns and two 57 mm M16 anti-aircraft guns. It was decided on 22 April 1932 that the latter be replaced by Vickers 40 mm (1.6 in) guns. The 120 mm guns were subsequently removed, as were two of the boilers and one funnel. The aging ship provided a service as a target for the Swedish submarines. In 1939, the ship was briefly recommissioned as part of the defences against possible invasion in the Second World War. When it became clear that this was not going to happen, on 9 October 1941, the vessel made a last voyage and, on 30 December 1941, was decommissioned. Svea was broken up at Karlskrona between 1943 and 1944.

== Bibliography ==
- Campbell, N J M (1979). "Sweden". In Gardiner, Robert (ed.). Conway's All the World's Fighting Ships 1860–1905. London: Conway Maritime Press. pp. 360–363. ISBN 978-0-85177-133-5.
- Fleks, Adam (1997). Od Svea Do Drottning Victoria [From Svea to Drottning Victoria] (in Polish). Tarnowskie Góry: Okręty Wojenne. ISBN 978-8-39022-748-1. OCLC 401825394.
- Friedman, Norman (2011). Naval Weapons of World War One: Guns, Torpedoes, Mines and ASW Weapons of All Nations; An Illustrated Directory. Barnsley, UK: Seaforth Publishing. ISBN 978-1-84832-100-7.
- Gard, Bertil; Becker, William A. B (1966). "Scandinavian Coast Defense Ships: Part I – Sweden". Warship International. 3 (2): 130–139. JSTOR 44885673.
- von Hofsten, Gustaf; Waernberg, Jan; Ohlsson, Curt S. (2003). Örlogsfartyg: svenska maskindrivna fartyg under tretungad flagg [Naval vessels: Swedish Motor-driven Ships under the Tritongued Flag]. [Forum navales skriftserie], 1650-1837; [6] (in Swedish). Stockholm: Svenskt militärhistoriskt bibl. i samarbete med Marinlitteratur. ISBN 919743843X. SELIBR 8873330.
- Insulander, Per; Ohlsson, Curt S (2001). Pansarskepp: Från John Ericsson till Gustav V [Armoured ships: From John Ericsson to Gustav V] (in Swedish) (1:a ed.). Falkenberg: C B Marinlitteratur AB. ISBN 978-9-19731-872-3.
- Westerlund, Karl-Erik (1992). Svenska Örlogsfartyg 1855–1905 [Swedish Naval Ships 1855–1905] (in Swedish). Karlskrona: Abrahamson. ISBN 978-9-18707-213-0.
