= HSwMS Niord =

Swedish coastal defence ship

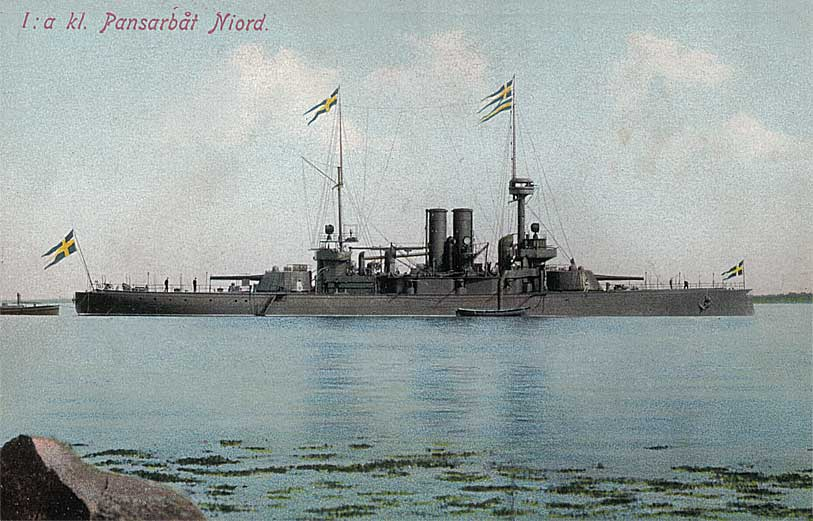
- Niord

History

Sweden
- Name: Niord
- Namesake: Niord
- Builder: Lindholmens shipyard, Gothenburg
- Laid down: 1896
- Launched: 31 March 1898
- Commissioned: 23 February 1899
- Decommissioned: 1944
- Fate: Broken up, 1945

General characteristics
- Class & type: Oden-class coastal defence ship
- Displacement: 3,328 t (3,275 long tons) (normal)
- Length: 84.9 m (278 ft 7 in) (w.l.)
- Beam: 14.77 m (48 ft 5 in)
- Draught: 5.5 m (18 ft 1 in) (max)
- Installed power: 6 marine boilers; 5,300 ihp (4,000 kW)
- Propulsion: 2 × triple-expansion steam engines; 2 × screws
- Speed: 15 knots (28 km/h; 17 mph)
- Range: 2,500 nmi (4,600 km; 2,900 mi) at 10 knots (19 km/h; 12 mph)
- Complement: 254
- Armament: 2 × single 25.4 cm (10 in) guns; 6 × single 12 cm (4.7 in) guns; 10 × single 5.7 cm (2.2 in) guns; 1 × single 45 cm (17.7 in) torpedo tube
- Armour: Belt: 100–240 mm (3.9–9.4 in); Barbette: 200 mm (7.9 in); Turrets: 190 mm (7.5 in); Deck: 49.5 mm (2 in); Conning tower: 190 mm (7.5 in)

HSwMS Niord (Note: "HSwMS" here stands for "Hans/Hennes Majestäts Skepp") was a Swedish first-class coastal defence ship (Pansarskepp) of the Oden class. A follow-on to the name-ship of the class Oden, Niord differed in having improved Harvey steel armour and two additional casemate-mounted 12 cm (4.7 in) guns. The vessel was launched in 1899 in Gothenburg. After an update completed in 1917 that radically altered the ship's appearance by replacing the two funnels with one, Niord was retired from front-line service in 1922. After serving as a barracks ship and tender supporting, in 1925, the seaplanes of what would become the Roslagen Air Corps, unemployed sailors in Stockholm in 1931 and the Cabin Boy Corps (Skeppsgossekåren) of Marstrand in 1935, the vessel was rearmed as an anti-aircraft battery during the Second World War. Decommissioned in 1944, Niord was broken up in Karlskrona in 1945.

== Design and development ==
Niord was the third member of the Oden class, a development of the earlier Svea class. Originally ordered to be a lone ship type, Oden proved to be such a success that the Swedish Navy ordered two similar vessels on 5 May 1896 to create a three-ship class of first-class coastal defence ships, or Pansarskeppen, able to take a place in the Swedish battle line. The new ships differed from their predecessor in having improved steel, which allowed a reduction of 200 long tons (200 t) in weight, and thus the addition of two more casemate-mounted 12 cm (4.7 in) guns. A hallmark of the improved design was extensive use of electric power, with Niord having 13 electric motors, nearly twice as many as Oden. Despite the differences, the three vessels, including sister ship Thor, are considered members of the same Oden class. As they were named after characters in Norse mythology, the ships are also known as the mythological class.

Niord had an overall length of 86.3 m (283 ft 2 in) and measured 84.9 m (278 ft 7 in) at the waterline, a beam of 14.77 m (48 ft 5 in) and a maximum draught of 5.5 m (18 ft 1 in). Displacement was 3,328 long tons (3,381 t) normal and 3,720 long tons (3,780 t) full load. Power was provided by six marine boilers feeding steam to two sets of triple-expansion steam engines provided by Motała AB and rated at 5,300 indicated horsepower (4,000 kW) driving two shafts, giving a design speed of 15 knots (28 km/h; 17 mph). During sea trials, on 29 January 1899, the vessel achieved 16.032 knots (29.69 km/h; 18.45 mph) and in 1900, 16.29 knots (30.17 km/h; 18.75 mph). Two funnels were fitted. A full load of 280 long tons (280 t) of coal was carried, which gave a design range of 2,500 nautical miles (4,600 km; 2,900 mi) at 10 knots (19 km/h; 12 mph). After the 1917 reconstruction, coal capacity was expanded to 300 long tons (300 t), which gave a design range of 2,530 nautical miles (4,690 km; 2,910 mi) at 10 knots (19 km/h; 12 mph). The ship had a complement of 254 officers and ratings.

Armament consisted of two single Bofors 25 cm (9.8 in) M1894 C guns mounted in turrets on the ship's centreline, one fore and the other aft. Each of the guns weighed 28.616 long tons (29.075 t). With an actual calibre of 25.4 cm (10 in), the guns were manufactured by Bofors from forgings provided by Whitworth, the first time the Swedish arms manufacturer had built a weapon of this size. They could fire a 200 kg (450 lb) shell at a muzzle velocity of 720 m/s (2,362 ft/s). The mounting, designated M1894, used electric training and manual elevation. Secondary armament consisted of six Bofors 12 cm (4.7 in) guns mounted three each side singularly in casemates amidships. The central guns could traverse 136 degrees, while the outside weapons were limited to 115 degrees. The ship was also armed with a tertiary armament of ten single Bofors 5.7 cm (2.2 in) guns, two on the forward bridge, four on the forward superstructure, two on the aft superstructure and two on the aft bridge. Two 25 mm (1.0 in) machine guns were carried by the pinnaces and two 8 mm (0.3 in) were mounted on the tops. A single submerged 45 cm (17.7 in) torpedo tube was mounted in the bow. Four 90 cm (35 in) searchlights were carried.

The armour was Harvey steel provided by John Brown & Company of Sheffield. It included a 50 m (164 ft 1 in)-long armoured belt that was between 100 and 240 mm (3.9 and 9.4 in) thick and 1.48 m (58.3 in) high. The main armament was protected by barbettes that were 200 mm (7.9 in) thick and turrets 190 mm (7.5 in) thick with a roof 30 mm (1.2 in) thick. The secondary armament sat on barbettes protected by 100 mm (3.9 in) nickel-steel armour, the turrets having a face 125 mm (4.9 in) thick, sides 60 mm (2.4 in) thick and a roof 48 mm (1.9 in) thick. The armour on the casemates was 91 mm (3.6 in) thick. The conning tower was protected by 190 mm (7.5 in) armour and the deck was protected by two layers that had a combined thickness of 49.5 mm (1.95 in) thick.

== Construction and career ==
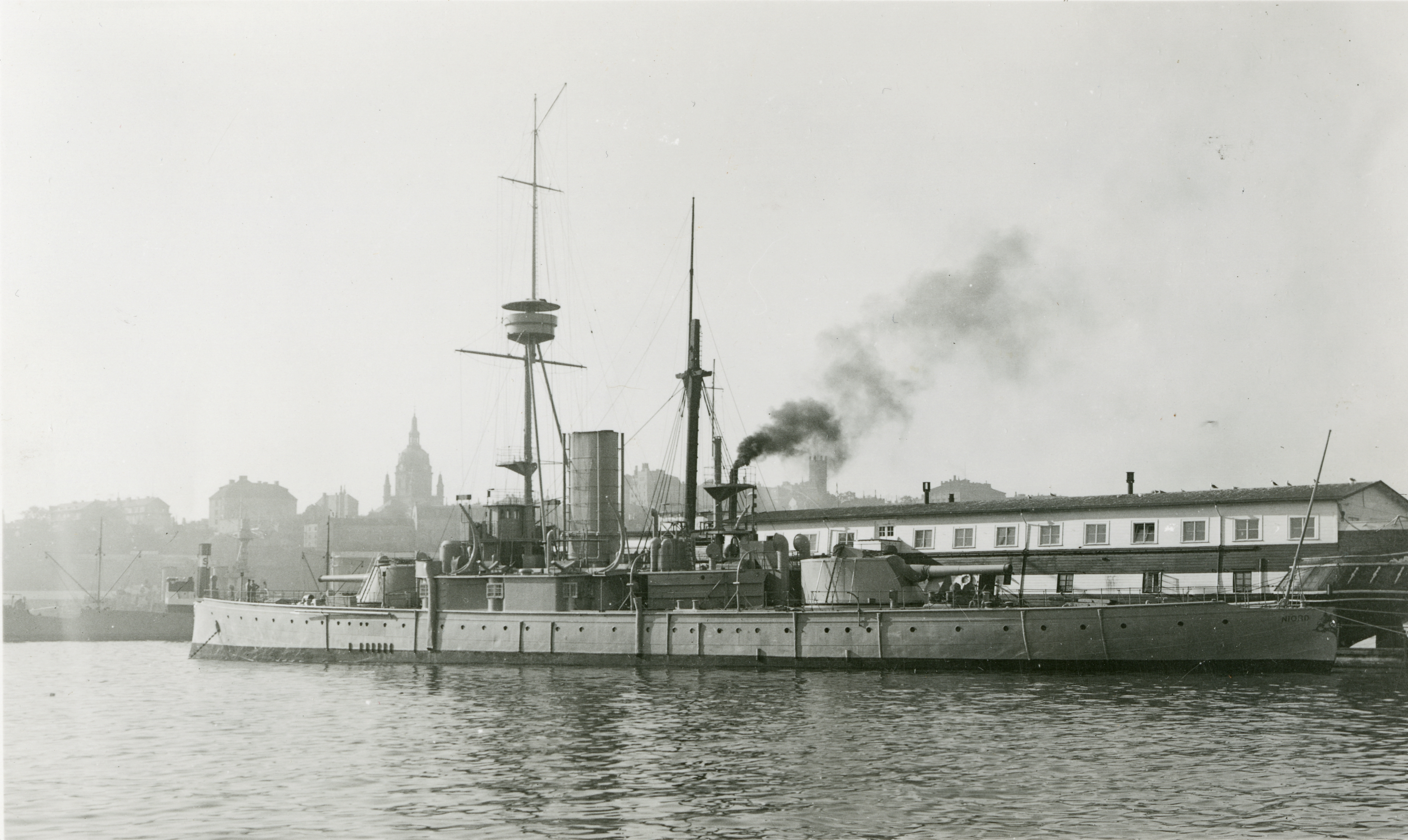
Niord in 1937

Niord was ordered from the Lindholmens shipyard in Gothenburg at a cost of 1,871,000 Swedish krona, and named on 22 August 1896. Laid down in 1896, the ship, named after the Norse god Niord, was launched on 31 March 1898 and commissioned on 23 February 1899. The warship was not equipped as a flagship, but was designed to be converted if necessary. In 1902, bilge keels were added to aid stability. On 20 February 1904, the vessel was briefly activated in response to activity from the Imperial Russian Navy during the Russo-Japanese War but saw no action. Between 19 and 24 August 1906, the vessel joined sister ship Oden and other ships of the Swedish Navy to host the British Cruiser Squadron under Admiral Sir Day Bosanquet at Gothenburg. During the same year, one 37 mm (1.5 in) gun was added to each of the ship's boats and, on 16 September 1908, the 8 mm (0.3 in) guns were removed from the tops.

In 1914, the vessel was taken out of service and sent to Karlskrona to be upgraded. The funnels were replaced by a single funnel, which radically altered the vessel's appearance, and the arrangement of the bridge and conning tower was altered to help the gunnery observers. The tertiary armament, machine guns and torpedo tube were all removed. Instead, six upgraded 5.7 cm (2.2 in) guns were mounted on the superstructure. New boilers were also fitted, which slightly improved performance. Niord resumed service in 1917, and briefly provided support to Sweden's neutrality in the First World War, but this did not last long as there was limited opportunity to serve before the Armistice of 11 November 1918.

Declared obsolete, the vessel was taken out of front-line service and redeployed as a barracks ship in Karlskrona on 7 July 1922. On 22 August, Niord was re-equipped to also act as a tender and, on 12 May 1925, moved to Hägernäs to support the development of what would become the Roslagen Air Corps and their seaplanes, replacing the corvette Freja. However, soon after, on 25 June, the vessel was ordered to transfer to the naval school at Hårsfjärden, arriving on 13 February the following year to serve as a barracks ship for the cadets. On 4 December 1931, the ship was temporarily contracted to the Stockholm Municipality to provide accommodation for unemployed sailors due to the dramatic increase in unemployment that was occurring before being transferred to Marstrand on 11 April 1935 to serve as a base for the Cabin Boy Corps (Skeppsgossekåren). When the corps was closed down in 1939, Niord was towed back to Hårsfjärden to act as a barracks ship again.

At the outbreak of the Second World War, the warship was assessed for viability and declared unfit for combat. However, the Navy felt that there was still the opportunity for the vessel to serve as an anti-aircraft battery and four Bofors 40 mm (1.6 in) anti-aircraft guns were added. Niord saw no combat and, in 1944, was decommissioned and assigned as a target ship, finally being broken up at Karlskrona in 1945. The ship's aft gun was transferred to the coastal artillery battery at Slite before finally being deactivated and placed on display as an exhibit at the Marinmuseum on the island of Stumholmen.

== Bibliography ==
- Campbell, N J M (1979). "Sweden". In Gardiner, Robert (ed.). Conway's All the World's Fighting Ships 1860–1905. London: Conway Maritime Press. pp. 360–363. ISBN 978-0-85177-133-5.
- Fleks, Adam (1997). Od Svea Do Drottning Victoria [From Svea to Drottning Victoria] (in Polish). Tarnowskie Góry: Okręty Wojenne. ISBN 978-8-39022-748-1. OCLC 401825394.
- Friedman, Norman (2011). Naval Weapons of World War One: Guns, Torpedoes, Mines and ASW Weapons of All Nations; An Illustrated Directory. Barnsley, UK: Seaforth Publishing. ISBN 978-1-84832-100-7.
- Harris, Daniel G. (1996). "The Swedish Armoured Coastal Defence Ships". Warship (XX): 9–24.
- von Hofsten, Gustaf; Waernberg, Jan; Ohlsson, Curt S. (2003). Örlogsfartyg: svenska maskindrivna fartyg under tretungad flagg [Naval vessels: Swedish Motor-driven Ships under the Tritongued Flag]. [Forum navales skriftserie], 1650-1837; [6] (in Swedish). Stockholm: Svenskt militärhistoriskt bibl. i samarbete med Marinlitteratur. ISBN 919743843X. SELIBR 8873330.
- Insulander, Per; Ohlsson, Curt S (2001). Pansarskepp: Från John Ericsson till Gustav V [Armoured ships: From John Ericsson to Gustav V] (in Swedish) (1:a ed.). Falkenberg: C B Marinlitteratur AB. ISBN 978-9-19731-872-3.
- Office of Naval Intelligence (1900). Notes on Naval Progress. General Information Series: Information from Abroad. Washington: Government Printing Office.
- Parkes, Oscar; Prendergast, Maurice (1969). Jane's Fighting Ships 1919. Newton Abbott: David & Charles. OCLC 907574860.
- Westerlund, Karl-Erik (1992). Svenska Örlogsfartyg 1855–1905 [Swedish Naval Ships 1855–1905] (in Swedish). Karlskrona: Abrahamson. ISBN 978-9-18707-213-0.
