= Svea =

Svea may refer to:

== Name ==
- Svea (name), Swedish female given name meaning "Swede"
- Mother Svea, personification of Sweden
- Svea (singer) (Svea Virginia Kågemark, born 1999), a Swedish singer

== Places ==
- United States
  - Svea, Florida, unincorporated community
  - Svea, Minnesota, unincorporated community
  - Svea Township, Kittson County, Minnesota
- Svealand, the historical core of Sweden, around Stockholm
- Svea Research Station, Antarctica
- Sveagruva, also called Svea, a mining settlement in Svalbard, Norway
  - Svea Airport
  - Svea Glacier

== Svealand military units ==
- Svea Life Guards, 1521–2000
- Svea Artillery Regiment, 1794–1997
- Svea Engineer Corps, 1855–1997
- Svea Logistic Corps, 1891–1997

== Vehicles ==
- Svea-class coastal defence ship, a class of three Swedish Navy ships
- Any of the ships named MS Svea
- Svea, a J-class yacht
- Svea Velocipede, 19th-century bicycle

== Companies ==
- Rederi AB Svea, shipping
- Svea Fireworks, fireworks importer
- Svea Flyg, airline

== Other uses ==
- Mother Svea, personification of Sweden
- Svea Court of Appeal, appellate court in Stockholm
- Order of Svea, a Swedish fraternal order
- 329 Svea, a main belt asteroid
- Svea 123, a model of liquid-fuel stoves
- SVEA (slowly varying envelope approximation), a method in optics to solve the electromagnetic wave equation
