= Svea (name) =

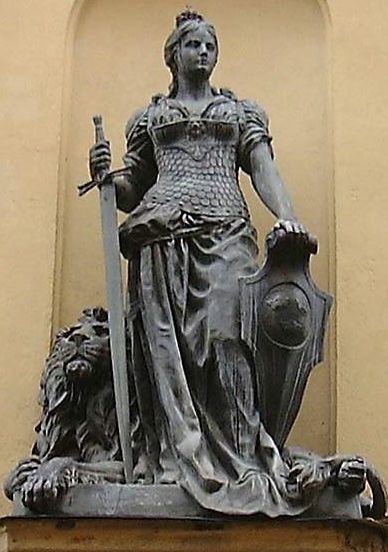
Statue of Mother Svea

Svea is a Swedish female name derived from the tribe called "Svear" or "Swedes," who came to conquer the land which is today's Sweden. The name was very popular in Sweden during the first half of the 20th century, and in the 2010s began to revive in popularity. Mother Svea is a national personification of Sweden. People named Svea include:

- Svea (singer), Svea Virginia Kågemark (born 1999), Swedish pop singer
- Svea Kristina Frisch, (1898–1991), known as Kristina Lindstrand, Swedish actor, journalist, author, and poet
- Svea Holst (1901–1996), Swedish film actress
- Svea Irving (born 2002), American freestyle skier
- Svea Josephy, (born 1969) South African photographer
- Svea Köhrbrück, (born 1993), German sprinter
- Svea Norén (1895–1985), Swedish figure skater
- Svea Nordblad Welander (1898–1985), Swedish composer, organist, teacher, and violist
- Svea Silver (born 2006), Canadian poet, and actor.
- Svea Andersson (born c. 1997), Swedish-American long-distance walker.

== See also ==
- Svea (disambiguation)
