= HSwMS Thor (1898) =

Swedish coastal defence ship

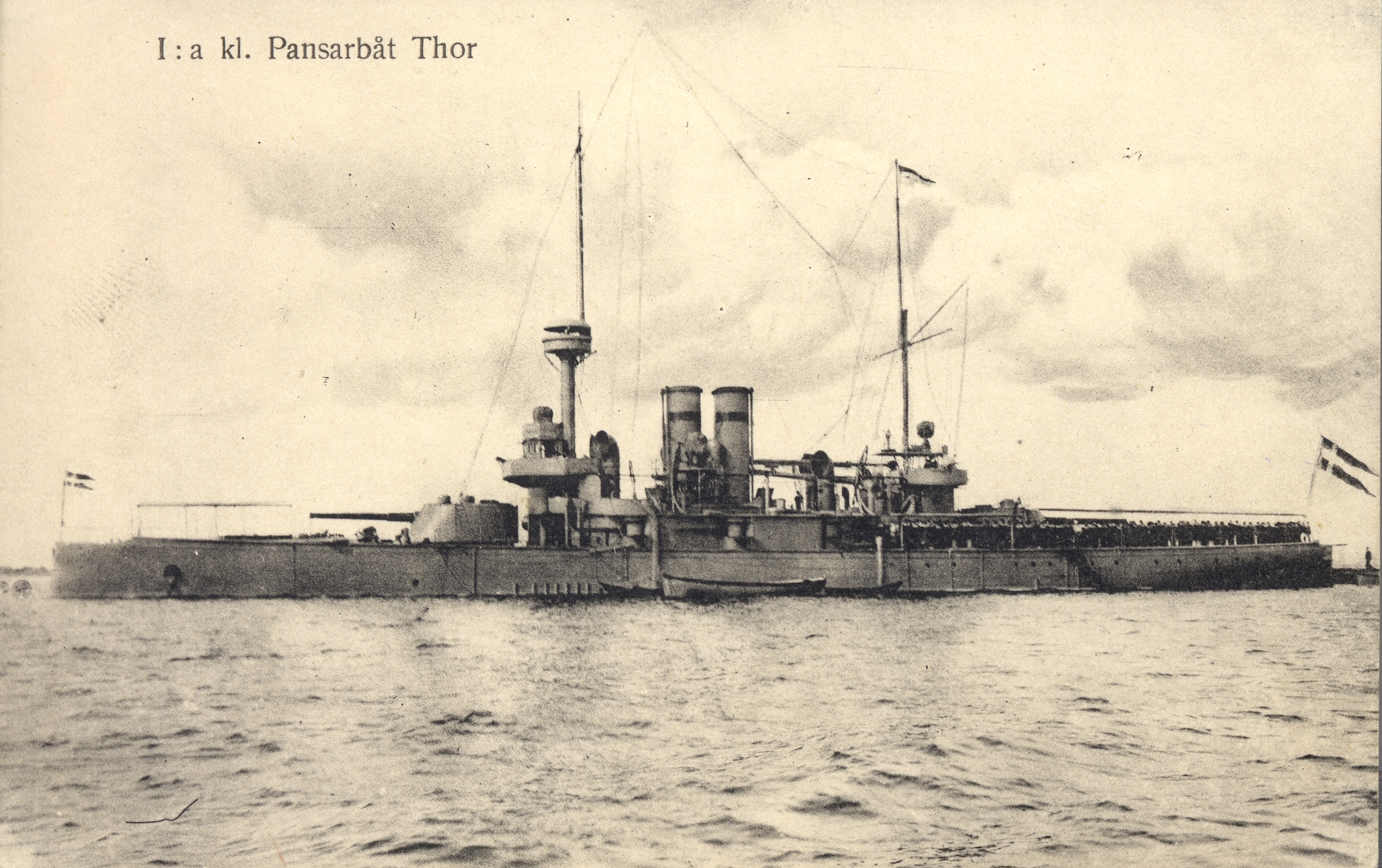
- Thor

History

Sweden
- Name: Thor
- Namesake: Thor, the Norse god of thunder
- Builder: Bergsunds, Stockholm
- Cost: SEK1,871,000
- Laid down: 1896
- Launched: 7 March 1898
- Commissioned: 29 June 1899
- Decommissioned: 16 July 1937
- Fate: Broken up, 1942

General characteristics
- Class & type: Oden-class coastal defence ship
- Displacement: 3,328 t (3,275 long tons) (normal)
- Length: 84.9 m (278 ft 7 in) (w.l.)
- Beam: 14.77 m (48 ft 5 in)
- Draught: 5.5 m (18 ft 1 in) (max)
- Installed power: 6 marine boilerss; 5,300 ihp (4,000 kW)
- Propulsion: 2 × triple-expansion steam engines; 2 × screws
- Speed: 16 knots (30 km/h; 18 mph)
- Range: 2,500 nmi (4,600 km; 2,900 mi) at 10 knots (19 km/h; 12 mph)
- Complement: 265
- Armament: 2 × single 25.4 cm (10.0 in) guns; 6 × single 12 cm (4.7 in) guns; 10 × single 5.7 cm (2.2 in) guns; 1 × single 46 cm (18 in) torpedo tubes
- Armour: Belt: 100–240 mm (3.9–9.4 in); Barbette: 200 mm (7.9 in); Turrets: 190 mm (7.5 in); Deck: 49.5 mm (2 in); Conning tower: 190 mm (7.5 in)

HSwMS Thor (Note: "HSwMS" here stands for "Hans/Hennes Majestäts Skepp") was a Swedish first class coastal defence ship (Pansarskepp). A follow-on to the name-ship of the class, Oden, Thor differed in having improved Harvey steel armour, a greater use of electric power and two additional casemate-mounted 12 cm (4.7 in) guns. The vessel was launched in 1899 and visited Portsmouth naval base in 1907. After an upgrade between 1914 and 1916, the warship operated in support of Sweden's neutrality in the First World War, participating in the Invasion of Åland in 1918. Thor was the first Swedish vessel to arrive and remained on duty when the German dreadnought battleships Rheinland and Westfalen arrived. The matter was resolved peacefully. After an otherwise uneventful career, Thor retired in 1937 and broken up.

== Design and development ==
Thor was the second member of the Oden class, a development of the earlier Svea class. Originally ordered to be a lone ship type, Oden proved to be such a success that the Swedish Navy ordered two similar vessels on 5 May 1896 to create a three-ship class of first-class coastal defence ships, or Pansarskeppen, able to take a place in the Swedish battle line. The new ships differed from their predecessor in having improved steel, which allowed a reduction of 200 long tons (200 t) in weight, and thus the addition of two more casemate-mounted 12 cm (4.7 in) guns. A hallmark of the improved design was extensive use of electric power, with Thor having 13 electric motors, nearly twice as many as Oden. Despite the differences, the three vessels, including the third ship Niord, are considered members of the same Oden class. As they were named after characters in Norse mythology, the ships are also known as the mythological class.

Thor had an overall length of 86.3 m (283 ft 2 in) and measured 84.9 m (278 ft 7 in) at the waterline, a beam of 14.77 m (48 ft 5 in) and a maximum draught of 5.5 m (18 ft 1 in). Displacement was 3,328 long tons (3,381 t) normal and 3,720 long tons (3,780 t) full load. Power was provided by six marine boilers feeding steam to two sets of triple-expansion steam engines and rated at 5,300 indicated horsepower (4,000 kW) driving two shafts, giving a design speed of 15 knots (28 km/h; 17 mph). During sea trials, the vessel exceeded 15.5 knots (28.7 km/h; 17.8 mph), and at one point achieved 16.44 knots (30.45 km/h; 18.92 mph). Two funnels were fitted. A full load of 280 long tons (280 t) of coal was carried, which gave a design range of 2,500 nautical miles (4,600 km; 2,900 mi) at 10 knots (19 km/h; 12 mph). After reconstruction in 1914 and 1915, coal capacity was expanded to 300 long tons (300 t), which gave a design range of 2,530 nautical miles (4,690 km; 2,910 mi) at 10 knots (19 km/h; 12 mph). The ship had a complement of 254 officers and ratings. The warship was fitted out to act as a flagship.

Armament consisted of two single 25.4 cm (10.0 in) M1894 B guns mounted in turrets on the ship's centreline, one fore and the other aft. Each of the guns weighed 23.5 long tons (23.9 t). They were manufactured by the French company Société Nouvelle des Forges et Chantiers de la Méditerranée as the Swedish armament industry was not capable of manufacturing weapons of this calibre at the time, although this changed with the construction of Thor's sister ship Niord. The guns could fire a 200 kg (450 lb) shell at a muzzle velocity of 2,362 ft/s (720 m/s). The mounting, designated M1894, used electric training and manual elevation. Secondary armament consisted of six Bofors 12 cm (4.7 in) guns mounted singularly in casemates amidships. The central gun could traverse 136 degrees, while the outside weapons were limited to 115 degrees. The ship was also armed with a tertiary armament of ten single Bofors 5.7 cm (2.2 in) guns, two on the forward bridge, four on the forward superstructure, two on the aft superstructure and two on the aft bridge. Two 25 mm (1.0 in) machine guns were carried by the pinnaces and two 8 mm (0.3 in) machine guns were mounted on the tops. A single submerged 46 cm (18 in) torpedo tube was mounted in the bow. Four 90 cm (35 in) searchlights were carried.

The armour was of Harvey steel provided by John Brown & Company of Sheffield. It included a 50 m (164 ft 1 in)-long armoured belt that was between 100 and 240 mm (3.9 and 9.4 in) thick and 1.48 m (4 ft 10.3 in) wide. The main armament was protected by barbettes that were 200 mm (7.9 in) thick and turrets 190 mm (7.5 in) thick with a roof 30 mm (1.2 in) thick. The secondary armament sat on barbettes protected by 100 mm (3.9 in) thick armour, in this case nickel-steel rather than Harvey steel, the turrets having a face 125 mm (4.9 in) thick, sides 60 mm (2.4 in) thick and a roof 48 mm (1.9 in) thick. The armour on the casemates was 91 mm (3.6 in) thick. The conning tower was protected by 190 mm (7.5 in) armour and the deck was protected by two layers that had a combined thickness of 49.5 mm (1.95 in) thick.

== Construction and career ==
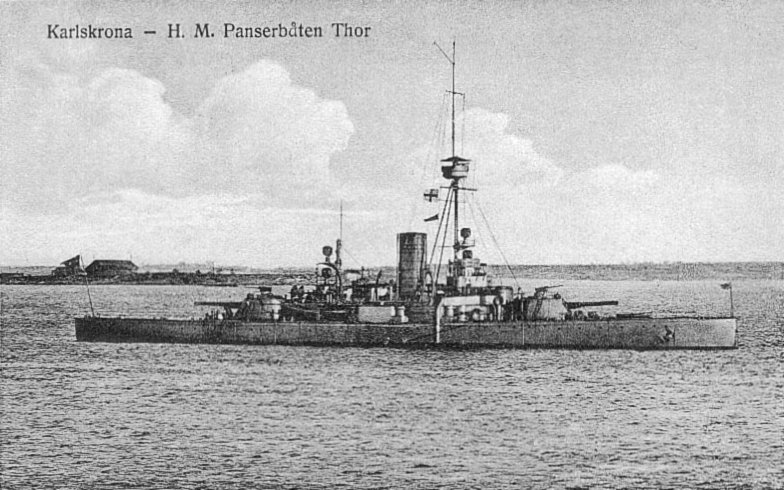
Thor as rebuilt

Thor was ordered from the Bergsunds shipyard in Stockholm at a cost of 1,871,000 Swedish krona, and named on 22 August 1896. Laid down in 1896, the ship was launched on 7 March 1898 and commissioned on 29 June 1899. In 1902, vessel was equipped with a bilge keel and in 1906 a 37 mm (1.5 in) quick-firing gun was mounted on each of the ship's pinnaces, the machine gun being removed on 16 September 1908. Meanwhile, following a Royal order signed on 16 July 1907, accommodation for training cadets had been added to the superstructure. On 7 August that year, the ship joined a flotilla led by the coastal defence ship Oscar II on a visit to Portsmouth, which gave the cadets onboard the opportunity to see the naval base. A similar visit took place to Dover on 4 June 1913, this time alongside the torpedo cruiser Jacob Bagge.

The ship was taken out of the service and rebuilt at Karlskrona between 1914 and 1915. The fighting mast was replaced by a much smaller three-legged mast and the two funnels were replaced by one. The remaining casemate-mounted 5.7 cm (2.2 in) guns were removed and those mounted on the superstructure upgraded. The machine guns and torpedo tubes were removed and new boilers installed, which improved performance.

Thor resumed service to provide support to Sweden's neutrality in the First World War. Following a request from the citizens of Åland on 9 February 1918, the vessel was dispatched on 14 February to protect the Swedish citizens on the island, arriving the following day at Eckerö, instigating the Invasion of Åland. Thor was the first Swedish vessel to arrive. With Russian forces in disarray due to Russian Civil War, the Swedish government saw an opportunity to occupy the islands, which the Russians also claimed. However, Germany was also interested in gaining the islands as part of a wider strategy to control the Baltic Sea. A German fleet consisting of the dreadnought battleships Rheinland and Westfalen arrived on 5 March and a stand-off ensued, which was resolved peacefully two days later.

This proved to be only action in which Thor participated and, on 16 July 1937, the warship was withdrawn from service. After attempts to find a private yard that wanted to purchase the vessel for scrapping failed, the ship was broken up by the team at Karlskrona in 1942.

== Bibliography ==
- Campbell, N J M (1979). "Sweden". In Gardiner, Robert (ed.). Conway's All the World's Fighting Ships 1860–1905. London: Conway Maritime Press. pp. 360–363. ISBN 978-0-85177-133-5.
- Fleks, Adam (1997). Od Svea Do Drottning Victoria [From Svea to Drottning Victoria] (in Polish). Tarnowskie Góry: Okręty Wojenne. ISBN 978-8-39022-748-1. OCLC 401825394.
- Friedman, Norman (2011). Naval Weapons of World War One: Guns, Torpedoes, Mines and ASW Weapons of All Nations; An Illustrated Directory. Barnsley, UK: Seaforth Publishing. ISBN 978-1-84832-100-7.
- Gard, Bertil; Becker, William A. B (1966). "Scandinavian Coast Defense Ships: Part I – Sweden". Warship International. 3 (2): 130–139. JSTOR 44885673.
- Harris, Daniel G. (1996). "The Swedish Armoured Coastal Defence Ships". Warship (XX): 9–24.
- Harjula, Mirko (2010). Itämeri 1914–1921: Itämeren laivastot maailmansodassa sekä Venäjän vallankumouksissa ja sisällissodassa [The Baltic Sea 1914–1921: Baltic Fleets in World War I and the Russian Revolutions and Civil War] (in Finnish). Helsinki: Books on Demand. ISBN 978-9-52498-383-9.
- von Hofsten, Gustaf; Waernberg, Jan; Ohlsson, Curt S. (2003). Örlogsfartyg: svenska maskindrivna fartyg under tretungad flagg [Naval Vessels: Swedish Motor-driven Ships under the Tri-tongued Flag]. [Forum navales skriftserie], 1650-1837; [6] (in Swedish). Stockholm: Svenskt militärhistoriskt bibl. i samarbete med Marinlitteratur. ISBN 919743843X. OCLC 57511564. SELIBR 8873330.
- Insulander, Per; Ohlsson, Curt S (2001). Pansarskepp: Från John Ericsson till Gustav V [Armoured Ships: From John Ericsson to Gustav V] (in Swedish) (1:a ed.). Falkenberg: C B Marinlitteratur AB. ISBN 978-9-19731-872-3.
- Office of Naval Intelligence (July 1900). Notes on Naval Progress. General Information Series: Information from Abroad. Washington: Government Printing Office.
- Parkes, Oscar; Prendergast, Maurice (1969). Jane's Fighting Ships 1919. Newton Abbott: David & Charles. OCLC 907574860.
- Salmon, Patrick (1997). Scandinavia and the Great Powers 1890–1940. Cambridge: Cambridge University Press. ISBN 978-0-521-89102-8.
- Staff, Gary (2010). German Battleships 1914–18 (1): Deutschland, Nassau and Helgoland Classes. Oxford: Osprey. ISBN 978-1-78096-337-2.
- Westerlund, Karl-Erik (1992). Svenska Örlogsfartyg 1855–1905 [Swedish Naval Ships 1855–1905] (in Swedish). Karlskrona: Abrahamson. ISBN 978-9-18707-213-0.
