= Oden-class coastal defence ship =

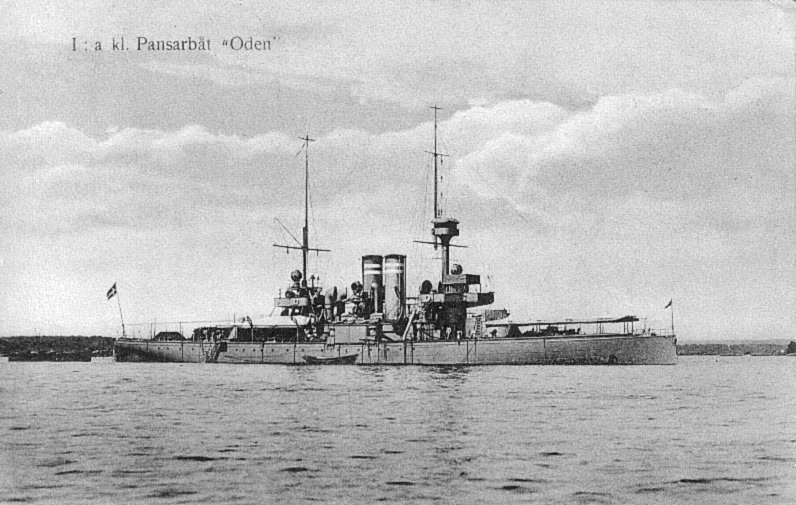
- Oden

Class overview
- Name: Oden class
- Builders: Bergsund At Finnboda (2), Lindholmens Verkstads AB At Goteborg (1)
- Operators: Swedish Navy
- Preceded by: Svea class
- Succeeded by: HSwMS Dristigheten
- Completed: 3
- Retired: 3

General characteristics
- Type: Coastal defense ship
- Displacement: 3,445 tons
- Length: 84.8 m (278 ft 3 in)
- Beam: 14.78 m (48 ft 6 in)
- Draught: 5.28 m (17 ft 4 in)
- Installed power: 6 boilers; 5,350 ihp (3,990 kW)
- Propulsion: 2 shafts; 2 triple-expansion engines
- Speed: 16.5 knots (30.6 km/h; 19.0 mph)
- Complement: 252
- Armament: 2 × single 25.4 cm (10 in) guns; 6 × single 12 cm (4.7 in) guns; 10 × single 5.7 cm (2.2 in) guns; 1 × 45 cm (18 in) torpedo tube
- Armour: 24.3 cm (9.6 in) belt; 20 cm (7.9 in) turret

The Oden class was a class of coastal defence ships of the Swedish Navy. The class comprised Oden, Niord and Thor.

== Design ==
=== Dimensions and machinery ===
The ships of the class had an overall length of 84.8 metres (278 ft 3 in), a beam of 14.78 metres (48 ft 6 in), and a draught of 5.28 metres (17 ft 4 in), and had a displaced 3,445 long tons (3,500 t). The ships were equipped with 2 shaft reciprocating engines, which were rated at 5,350 indicated horsepower (3,990 kW) and produced a top speed of 16.5 knots (30.6 km/h; 19.0 mph).

=== Armour ===
The ships had belt armour of 9.5 in (24 cm) and 8 in (20 cm) turret armour.

=== Armament ===
The main armament of the ships where two 10 in (25 cm) single turret guns. Secondary armament included six single 4.7 in (12 cm) guns and ten 5.7 cm (2.2 in) single guns.

== Construction ==
- Oden was laid down in 1894 at the Bergsund At Finnboda shipyard and was launched in 1896. She was commissioned in 1898.
- Niord was laid down in 1900 at the Lindholmens shipyard and was launched in 1898. She was commissioned in 1899.
- Thor was laid down in 1896 also at the Bergsund At Finnboda shipyard and was launched in 1898. She was commissioned in 1899.

== Bibliography ==
- Campbell, N. J. M. (1979). "Sweden". In Chesneau, Roger & Kolesnik, Eugene M. (eds.). Conway's All the World's Fighting Ships 1860–1905. Greenwich: Conway Maritime Press. pp. 360–363. ISBN 0-8317-0302-4.
