= HSwMS Thule (1893) =

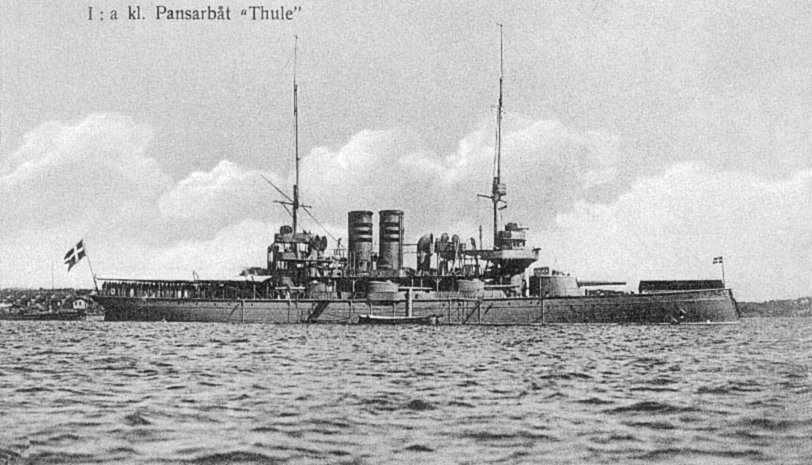
- Thule

History

Sweden
- Name: Thule
- Namesake: The mythical Thule
- Builder: Bergsunds Yard, Stockholm
- Launched: 4 March 1893
- Out of service: 1928
- Fate: Scrapped in 1933

General characteristics
- Class & type: Svea-class coastal defence ship
- Displacement: 3,150 tons
- Length: 79.5 m (260.83 ft)
- Beam: 14.6 m (47.90 ft)
- Speed: 16 knots (30 km/h; 18 mph)

HSwMS Thule was a Svea-class coastal defence ship of the Royal Swedish Navy.

Thule was launched on 4 March 1893 at Bergsunds Yard in Stockholm. She displaced 3,150 tons, had a LPP of 79.5 metres (261 ft) and a beam of 14.6 metres (48 ft). Thule was propelled by a two-cylinder steam engine which gave her a speed of 16 knots (30 km/h; 18 mph). She was struck from service in 1928, and broken up in 1933.
