= Mother Svea =

National personification of Sweden

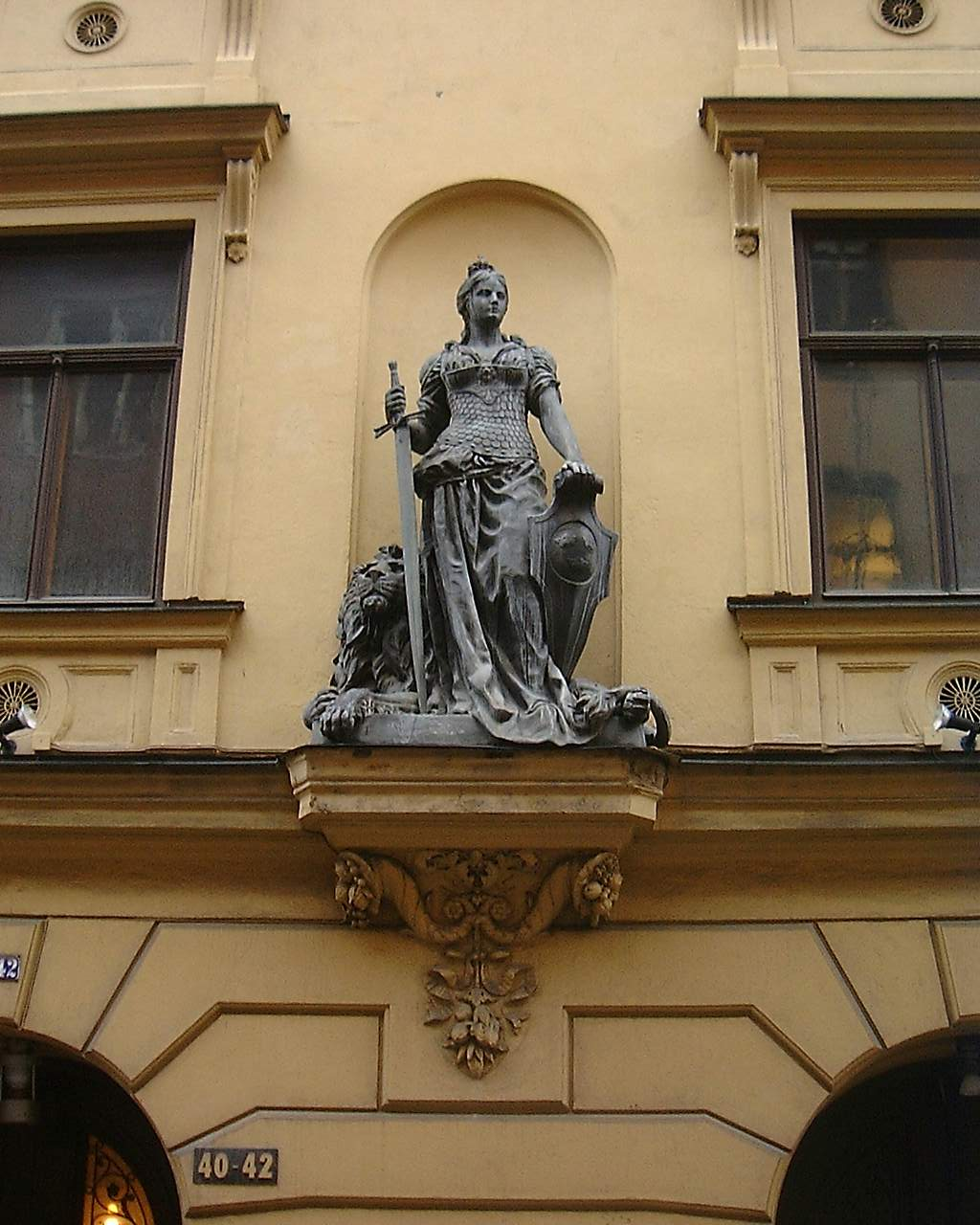
Moder Svea Rolf Adlersparre

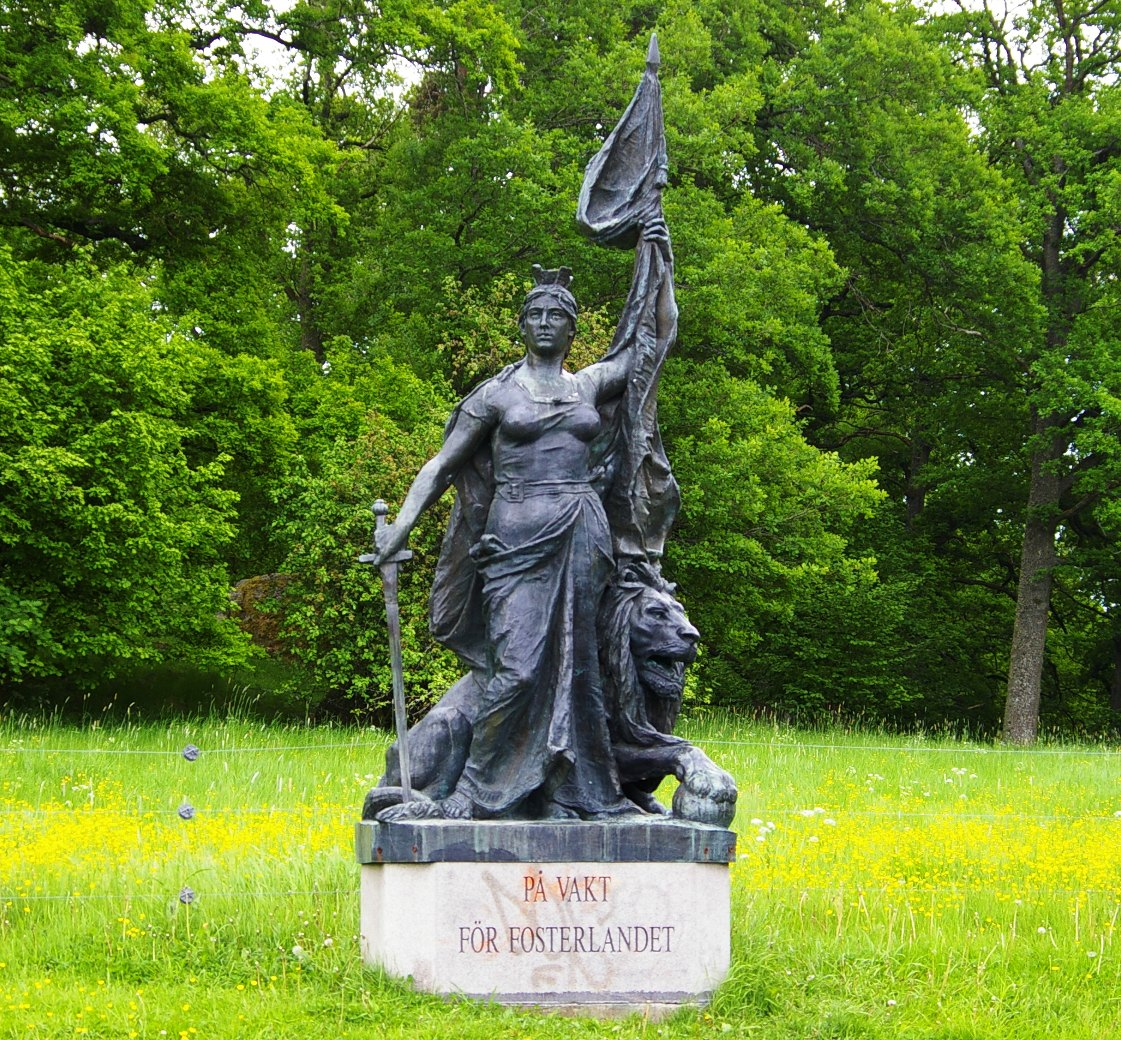
Moder Svea Alfred Nyström (1891)

Mother Svea or Mother Swea (Swedish: Moder Svea) is the female personification of Sweden and a patriotic emblem of the Swedish nation.

== Background ==
Mother Svea is normally depicted as a powerful female warrior, valkyrie or shieldmaiden, frequently holding a shield and standing beside a lion. Svea is a Swedish female personal name which derives from svea, an old plural genitive form meaning "of the Swedes" or the Swea. It appears in Svea rike, a translation of the old Swedish word Sverige, the Swedish name for Sweden.

The popular image is considered to have been created by Swedish writer, Anders Leijonstedt (1649–1725) when first introduced in his poem Svea Lycksaligheets Triumph (1672).

As a patriotic symbol, Moder Svea gained widespread popularity in Kunga Skald (1697), written by Swedish poet Gunno Eurelius (1661–1709) in honor of King Charles XI of Sweden. Eurelius was later ennobled with the name of Dahlstjerna.

Mother Svea appeared frequently as a national symbol in 19th-century Swedish literature and culture. She appeared on various Swedish banknotes for over seventy years, such as both the 5-kronor banknote printed between 1890 and 1952 and the 5-kronor banknote printed between 1954 and 1963.

Swedish singer Lena Philipsson and composer Torgny Söderberg wrote a song entitled Moder Swea which was introduced in the 1995 album Lena Philipsson.

== See also ==
- Flag of Sweden
- National anthem of Sweden
- National personification
- Three Crowns

== Sources ==
- Olsson, Bernt; Algulin, Ingemar (1987). Litteraturens historia i Sverige (in Swedish). Stockholm: Norstedt. ISBN 91-1-873022-1.
