= 12 cm kanon M/94 =

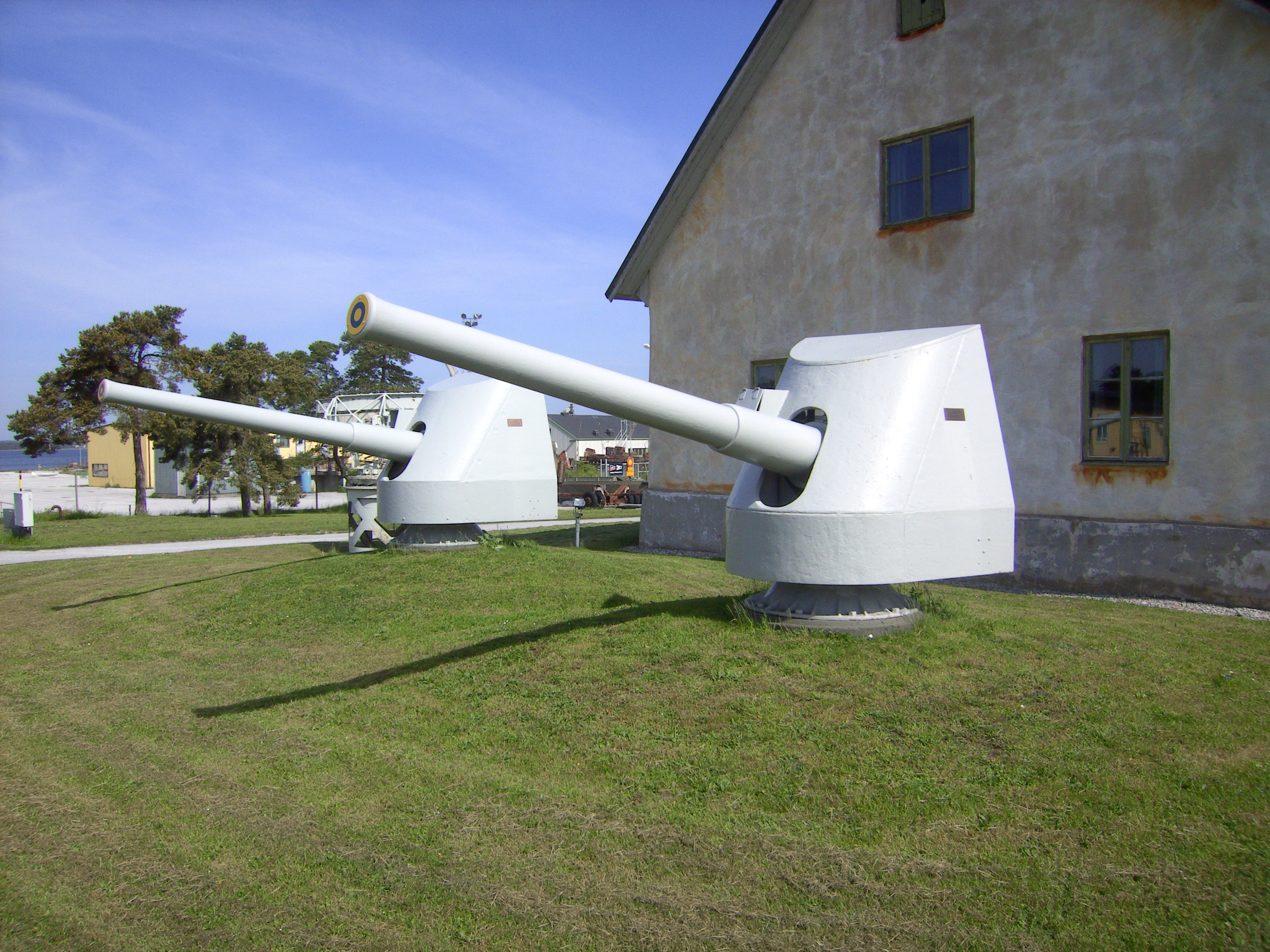
- 12 cm kanon m/94 at the old regiment KA 3 in Fårösund, Gotland, Sweden
- Type: Naval gun
- Place of origin: Sweden

Specifications
- Mass: 2.79 t (2.7 long tons)
- Length: 5.4 m (17 ft 9 in)
- Barrel length: 2.35 m (7 ft 9 in) (L/43.5)
- Shell weight: 20.9 kg (46 lb)
- Caliber: 12 cm (4.7 in)
- Muzzle velocity: 740 m/s (2,428 ft/s)

The 12 cm kanon M/94 was a Swedish naval gun deployed aboard the Oden-class coast-defense ships as their secondary armament.

== Bibliography ==
- Friedman, Norman (2011). Naval Weapons of World War One: Guns, Torpedoes, Mines and ASW Weapons of All Nations; An Illustrated Directory. Barnsley, UK: Seaforth Publishing. ISBN 978-1-84832-100-7.
