= Svea-class coastal defence ship =

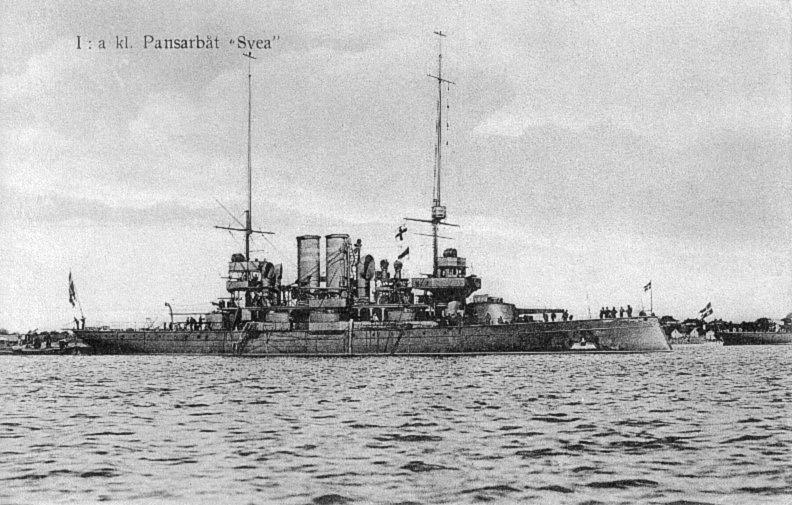
- Svea after her reconstruction.

Class overview
- Name: Svea class
- Builders: Lindholmen At Goteborg (1) and Finboda yard (1)
- Operators: Swedish Navy
- Succeeded by: Oden class
- Completed: 3
- Retired: 3

General characteristics
- Type: Coastal defense ship
- Displacement: 3,200 tons
- Length: 75.7 m (248 ft 4 in)
- Draught: 5.18 m (17 ft 0 in)
- Propulsion: 4,700 hp (3,500 kW)
- Speed: 16 knots (30 km/h; 18 mph)
- Complement: 252
- Armament: 2 × 10 in (25 cm); 4 × 6 in (15 cm) (4 × 1); 6 × 5.7 cm (2.2 in) (6 × 1); 3 × 15 in (38 cm) torpedo tubes
- Armour: 11.5 in (29 cm) belt; 11.5 in (29 cm) turret

The Svea class was a class of coastal defence ships of the Swedish Royal Navy. The class comprised Svea, Göta and Thule.

== Design ==
=== Dimensions and machinery ===
The ships of the class were 75.7 metres (248 ft 4 in) long, had a draught of 5.18 metres (17 ft 0 in), and had a displacement of 3,200 tons. The ships were equipped with reciprocating engines, which were rated at 4,700 ihp (3,500 kW) and produced a top speed of 16 kn (30 km/h).

=== Armour ===
The ships had belt armour of 11.5 in (29 cm) and 11.5 in (29 cm) turret armour.

=== Armament ===
The main armament of the ships was a 10 in (25 cm) twin turret gun. Secondary armament included four single 6 in (15 cm) guns and six 5.7 cm (2.2 in) single guns.

== Construction ==
Svea and Göta were both laid down at the Lindholmen in Gothenburg and launched on 12 December 1886 and 30 September 1891, respectively. Thule was laid down at the Finnboda Yard in Nacka and launched in 1893.

== Turrets ==
All the main battery turrets of the Svea-class ships were installed at Ellenabbsfortet, located at Aspö, a small island near Karlskrona harbour. The guns were removed in 1936. The turrets were scrapped.
