= Herman Magnus af Petersens =

Swedish court huntsman and landowner

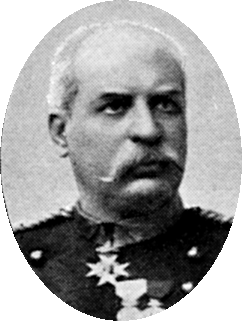
- Born: 21 October 1842
- Died: 21 August 1867 (aged 24)
- Noble family: af Petersens
- Father: Carl Herman af Petersens
- Mother: Sofia Carolina Dahlqvist
- Occupation: Hofjægermester

Herman Magnus af Petersens (1842–1903) was a Swedish nobleman, hovjägmästare (hunting master) and a landowner.

== Biography ==
Af Petersens was the son of Captain Carl Herman af Petersens (1801-1843), member of the Swedish nobility and his wife, Sofia Carolina Dahlqvist (1818-1900). He was the first hovjägmästare and owner of the Erstavik estate in Nacka. Herman Magnus was great-great-grandson of Herman Petersen, progenitor of the af Petersens noble family. On 4 July 1889 af Petersens sold 890 hectares from the estate.

== Marriage and issue ==
Herman Magnus was married to Countess Sofia Albertina Charlotta Augusta Eleonora Catharina Stenbock (1843-1916), daughter of Count Magnus Albert Carl Gustaf Arvid Stenbock (1800-1871) and his wife, Countess Johanna Margaretha Hamilton (1809-1892). They had five sons and two daughters. Among them was:

- August Herman af Petersens (1868-1943) ⚭ Viktoria Ebba Louise Vera Ankarcrona (1887-1976), elder daughter of Oscar Carl Gustav Ankarcrona and his wife, Anna Elisabeth Aurora Carleson (b. 1867), daughter of Edvard Henrik Carleson (1820–1912), Councilor of State of the Kingdom of Sweden. They had two sons and two daughters. Among them was:
  - Marie-Louise Victoria Katharina Elisabeth af Petersens (1910-1998) ⚭ her first cousin, Prince Karl-Stefan of Altenburg (1921-2018), had issue.

== Ancestry ==
Ancestors of Herman Magnus af Petersens

16. Herman Petersen
8. Herman af Petersens
17. Magdalena Bedoire
4. Herman af Petersens
9. Anna Elisabeth Silfverschiöld
2. Carl Herman af Petersens
10. Johan Gother
5. Elisabeth Maria Gother
11. Maria Elisabeth Brandberg
1. Herman Magnus af Petersens
6. Magnus Dahlqvist
3. Sofia Carolina Dahlqvist
7. Sofia Holmberg
