= Joachim Badeni =

Polish Dominican friar (1912–2010)

Servant of God Joachim Badeni OP
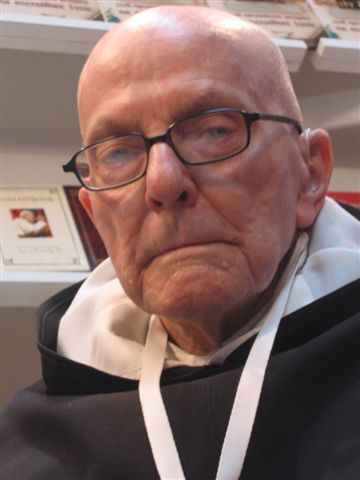
- Badeni in 2007
- Born: 14 October 1912; Brussels, Belgium
- Died: 11 March 2010 (aged 97); Kraków, Poland

Joachim Badeni, OP (born Kazimierz Stanisław Badeni; 14 October 1912 – 11 March 2010) was a Polish Dominican priest, count, academic and mystic. The Archdiocese of Kraków has initiated his cause for canonization.

== Biography ==
=== Background and youth ===
A descendant of the Badeni family, Kazimierz was the son of diplomat Count Ludwig Badeni and Alice Ankarcrona (later known as Alice Habsburg), a Swedish aristocrat. He was named after his grandfather Count Kasimir Felix Badeni, who served as Minister-President of Austria from 1895 until 1897. In 1914, Kazimierz's family moved to Switzerland, and then to Vienna, where his father died two years later. From 1916, he lived with his mother in Busk, Ukraine. After his mother remarried to Archduke Karl Albrecht of Austria, his half-siblings were born: brother Karl-Stefan, sisters Maria Krystyna and Renata Maria, and Karl-Albrecht, who died in childhood.

=== Studies and World War I ===
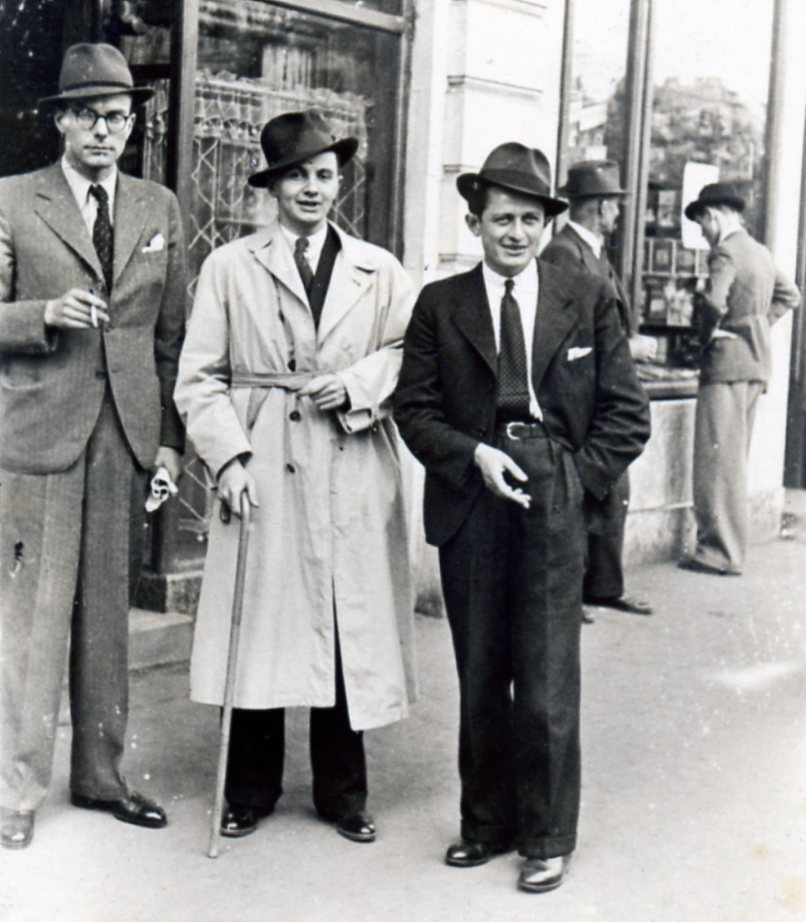
Kazimierz Badeni (first from left) with friends Adam Romiszowski and Zdzisław Kisielewski in Kraków, 1930s

In 1930, he passed the secondary school leaving examination at the Nicolaus Copernicus State Gymnasium in Żywiec. He graduated from the Faculty of Law of the Jagiellonian University on 1937.

After the outbreak of World War II, he was in Romania, then through Yugoslavia and Greece he got to Marseille, and then to Coëtquidan, Morbihan, where he joined the 3rd Rifle Company of the Polish army being formed in France. Then in the ranks of the Podhale Riflemen. He fought at Narvik, in France and Morocco. He was secretary of the Polish mission in Gibraltar. From the beginning of 1943, he was transferred to the staff of General Władysław Sikorski in England. Then in the parachute brigade.

At that time, he met Józef Maria Bocheński, who deepened his already existing priestly vocation. In July 1943, he entered a seminary in England, and in July 1944 – the Dominican novitiate in Hawkesyard Priory. On August 16, 1945, he made his first profession of vows taking the religious name Joachim after Saint Joachim.

=== Priesthood and ministry ===
From 1947, he lived in Poland, where he studied theology. In 1950, he was ordained a priest by Bishop Stanisław Rospond. He was, among others, an academic chaplain in Poznań (1957–1975), Wrocław (1975–1976) and Kraków (1977–1988). He was, among others, the co-founder of the Krakow Dominican "Beczka" pastoral ministry and the spiritual guardian of the Catholic Charismatic Renewal that was emerging in Poland.

His spiritual interests included Zen Buddhism, Carl Jung's depth psychology, the teachings of Meister Eckhart, and the works of J. R. R. Tolkien. In his memoirs, he was considered a mystic, although he himself called himself a prophet. There are also mentions of healings through his mediation, although Badeni himself never spoke of it publicly.

After he turned 90, his memoir books began to appear, concerning both theological and existential issues (conversations transcribed by journalists from the Catholic media, including Artur Sporniak, Jan Strzałka, and Alina Petrova). His book Sekrety mnichów, czyli sprawdzone przepisy na szczęśliwe życie ("Secrets of Monks, or Proven Recipes for a Happy Life)", written together with Father Leon Knabit, OSB, was awarded the Krakow Book of the Month Prize in January 2008. He did not write any of his books himself, all of them were dictated by him or are transcripts of interviews.

=== Death ===
Badeni died on 11 March 2010 at 1:16 a.m. in the Dominican monastery in Kraków on Stolarska Street. His last words were: "The wedding is ready. The groom is coming. I'm going to dance." By the decision of the President of the Republic of Poland, Lech Kaczyński, of 12 March 2010, he was posthumously awarded the Commander's Cross of the Order of Polonia Restituta "for outstanding services to the independence of the Republic of Poland, for achievements in scientific work and pastoral activity in the academic community". He was buried at the Rakowicki Cemetery in Kraków on 15 March 2010.

== Veneration ==
On 28 July 2018, Archbishop Marek Jędraszewski of Kraków in collaboration with the Dominican Province of Poland began the initial steps for Joachim Badeni's beatification process alongside the Dominican religious brother and mystic Gwala Torbiński.

== Publications ==
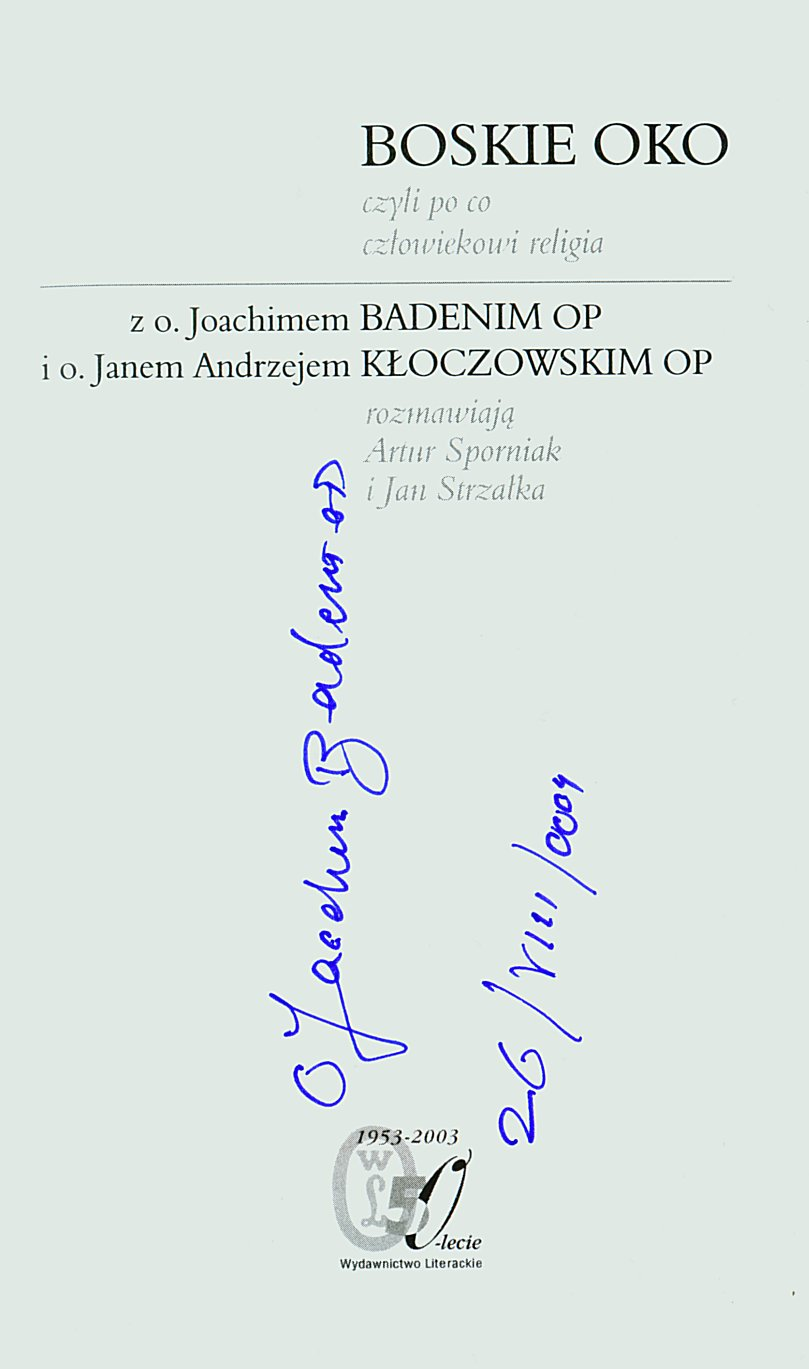
Joachim's autograph in the book The Divine Eye, or Why Man Needs Religion.

- Boskie oko, czyli po co człowiekowi religia. Z o. Joachimem Badenim i o. Janem Andrzejem Kłoczowskim rozmawiają Artur Sporniak i Jan Strzałka ("The Divine Eye, or Why Man Needs Religion. Artur Sporniak and Jan Strzałka talk with Fr. Joachim Badeni and Fr. Jan Andrzej Kłoczowski"), Kraków: Wydawnictwo Literackie, 2003. ISBN 83-08-03522-1
- Autobiografia. Z ojcem Joachimem Badenim rozmawiają Artur Sporniak i Jan Strzałka ("Autobiography. Artur Sporniak and Jan Strzałka talk with Father Joachim Badeni"), Kraków: Wydawnictwo Literackie, 2004. ISBN 83-08-03656-2
- Fotel z widokiem na pole ("Armchair with a View of the Field"), Poznań: W drodze, 2004. ISBN 83-7033-515-2
- Kobieta boska tajemnica (rozmowy z Judytą Syrek) ("The Divine Woman: Mystery (conversations with Judyta Syrek)"), Kraków: Rafael, 2006. ISBN 83-60293-44-9
- Kobieta i mężczyzna – Boska miłość (rozmowy z Sylwestrem Szeferem) ("Woman and Man – Divine Love (conversations with Sylwester Szefer)"), Kraków: Wydawnictwo AA, 2007. ISBN 978-83-61060-05-5
- Śmierć? Każdemu polecam (rozmowy z Aliną Petrową-Wasilewicz) ("Death? I Recommend It to Everyone (Conversations with Alina Petrova-Wasilewicz)"), Kraków: Rafael, 2007. ISBN 978-83-7569-012-5
- Sekrety mnichów, czyli sprawdzone przepisy na szczęśliwe życie (współautor: Leon Knabit) ("Secrets of Monks, or Proven Recipes for a Happy Life (co-authored with Leon Knabit)"), Kraków: Rafael, 2007. ISBN 978-83-7569-005-7
- O kapłaństwie, celibacie i małżeństwie z rozsądku (rozmowy z Aliną Petrową-Wasilewicz) ("On Priesthood, Celibacy and Marriage of Convenience (conversations with Alina Petrova-Wasilewicz)"), Kraków: Wydawnictwo M, 2009. ISBN 978-83-7595-067-0
- ... żywot wieczny. Amen. O tym, co czeka nas po śmierci ("...eternal life. Amen: About What Awaits Us After Death"), Kraków: Rafael, 2009. ISBN 978-83-7569-100-9
- Prosta modlitwa (współautorka: Alina Petrowa-Wasilewicz) ("A Simple Prayer (co-authored with Alina Petrowa-Wasilewicz)"), Kraków: Wydawnictwo M, 2010. ISBN 83-60293-44-9
- Uwierzcie w koniec świata! Współczesne proroctwo o powtórnym przyjściu Chrystusa (rozmowy z Judytą Syrek) ("Believe in the End of the World! Contemporary Prophecy of the Second Coming of Christ (conversations with Judyta Syrek)"), Kraków: Znak, 2010. ISBN 978-83-240-1407-1
- Mistyka codzienności ("Mysticism of Everyday Life"), Poznań: W drodze, 2018. ISBN 978-83-7906-237-9
