= Alice Habsburg =

Swedish-born aristocrat and member of the Polish Home Army

- Countess Badeni; Princess of Saxe-Altenburg
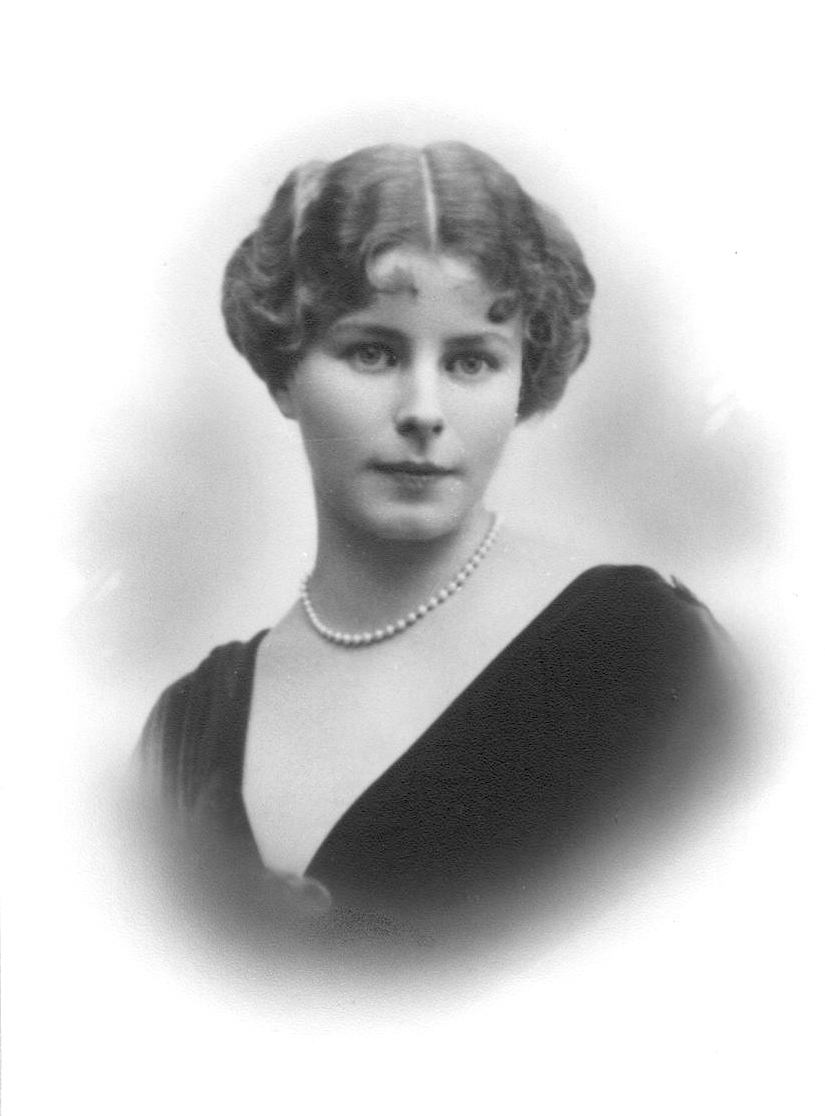
- Alice Habsburg in 1920
- Born: 18 December 1889; Hölö, Sweden
- Died: 26 November 1985 (aged 95); Saltsjöbaden, Sweden
- Spouse: Count Ludwik Badeni (m. 1911; died 1916) Archduke Karl Albrecht of Austria (m. 1920; died 1951)
- Issue: Kasimir Badeni; Prince Karl-Stefan; Princess Maria-Christina; Prince Karl Albrecht; Princess Renata
- House: Ankarcrona (by birth); Badeni (by marriage); Habsburg-Lorraine (by marriage)
- Father: Oscar Carl Gustav Ankarcrona
- Mother: Anna Carleson

Alice Habsburg, Princess of Altenburg (Polish: Alicja Elżbieta Ankarcrona; 18 December 1889 – 26 November 1985) was a Swedish-born aristocrat and member of the Polish Home Army during World War II.

== Early life and first marriage ==
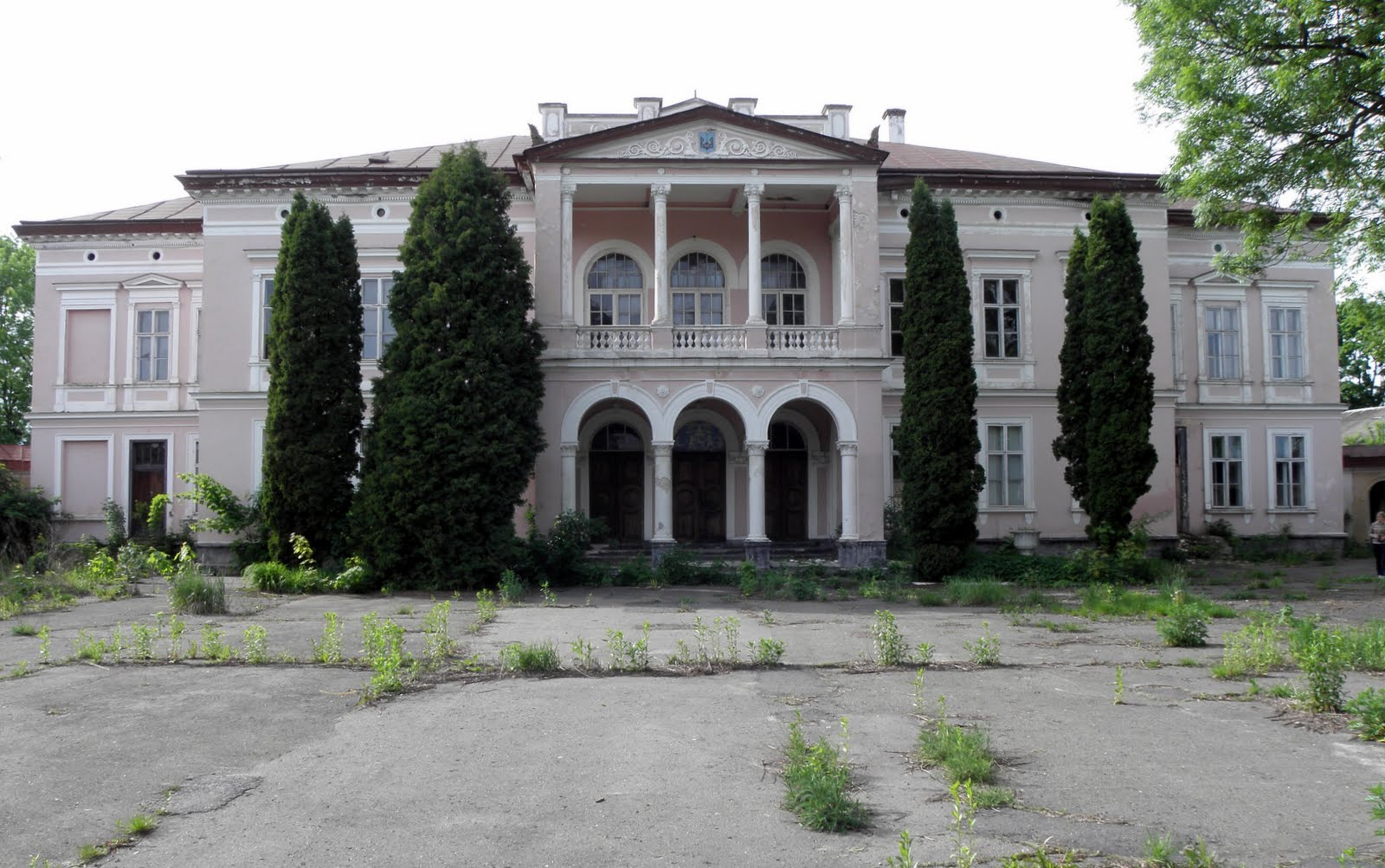
The Badeni palace in Busk (present-day Ukraine), where Alice Habsburg spent time during both the Polish–Ukrainian and Polish-Soviet War

Born in Hölö, Sweden as Alice Elisabeth Ankarcrona, member of the Ankarcrona family, which belonged to Swedish nobility of German origin. She was younger daughter of Oscar Carl Gustav Ankarcrona and his wife, Anna Elisabeth Aurora Carleson (b. 1867), daughter of Edvard Henrik Carleson (1820–1912), Councilor of State of the Kingdom of Sweden. She grew up in Sweden. In 1911, she married Count Ludwik Badeni (1873-1916), a diplomat working at the Austro-Hungarian legation in Stockholm. He was the son of Count Kasimir Felix Badeni, Minister-President of Cisleithania. During their engagement, she converted to Catholicism. The couple had a single son, Kasimir Stanislaw Badeni (1912–2010), who later became a member of the Dominican Order. Shortly after his son's birth, Count Ludwik Badeni started to suffer from mental illness and was taken to a mental hospital. He died in 1916.

Her son Kasimir inherited his father's palace and an estate in Busk, today in Ukraine. Alice was shocked by the poverty in Austrian Galicia and sold off most of her jewelry to invest in welfare and economic improvements at her Busk estates. At the end of World War I she was in Vienna. In the background of the disintegrating Austro-Hungarian state she witnessed first-hand the Polish–Ukrainian War and the Battle of Lwów, where she was impressed by the Polish Lwów Eaglets, and then rejoined her son at Busk which had been looted by Cossacks and Ukrainian peasants.

== Life in Poland ==
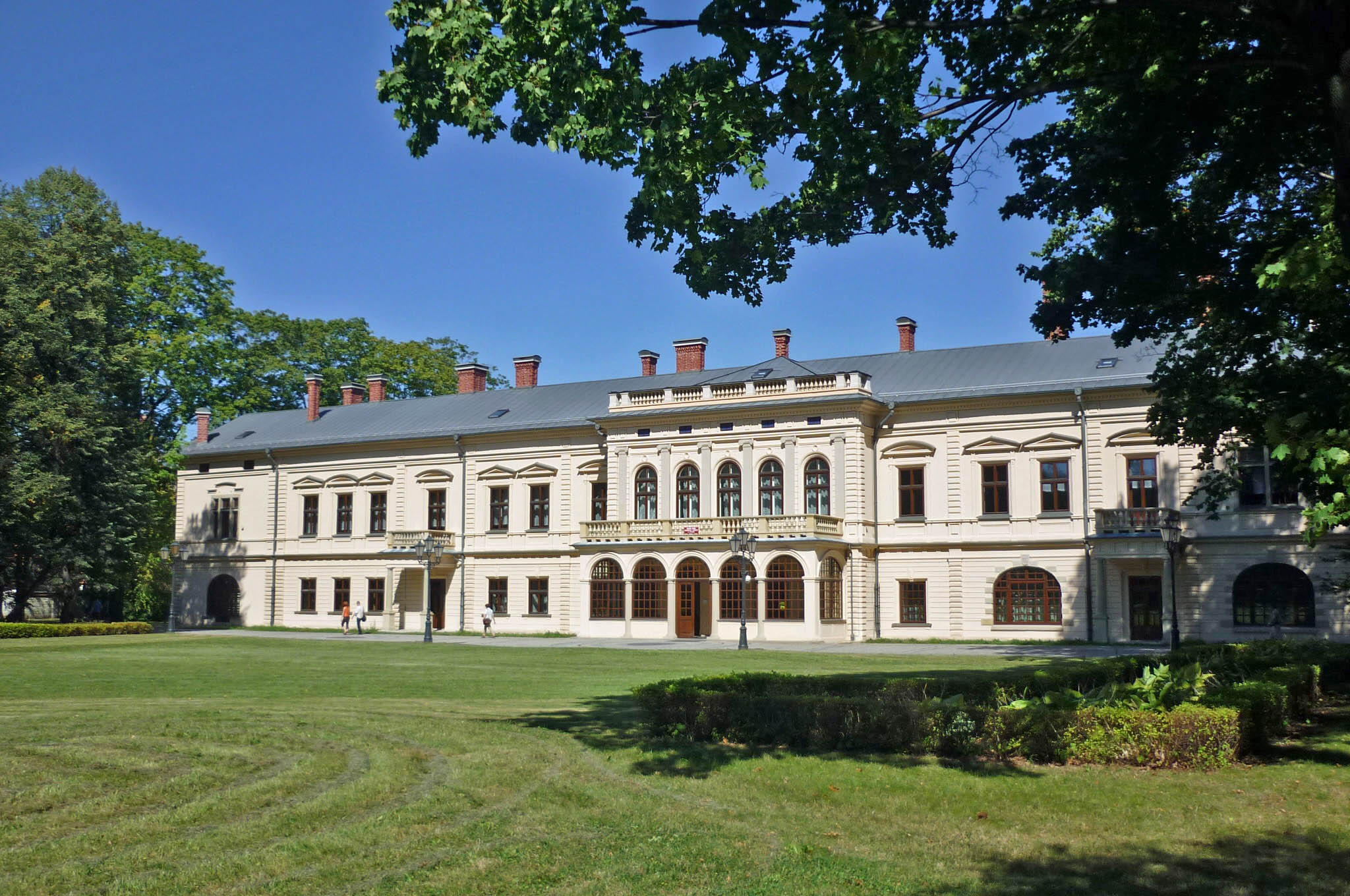
The Habsburg palace in Żywiec, Poland, where Alice Habsburg lived between the wars and during a large part of World War II

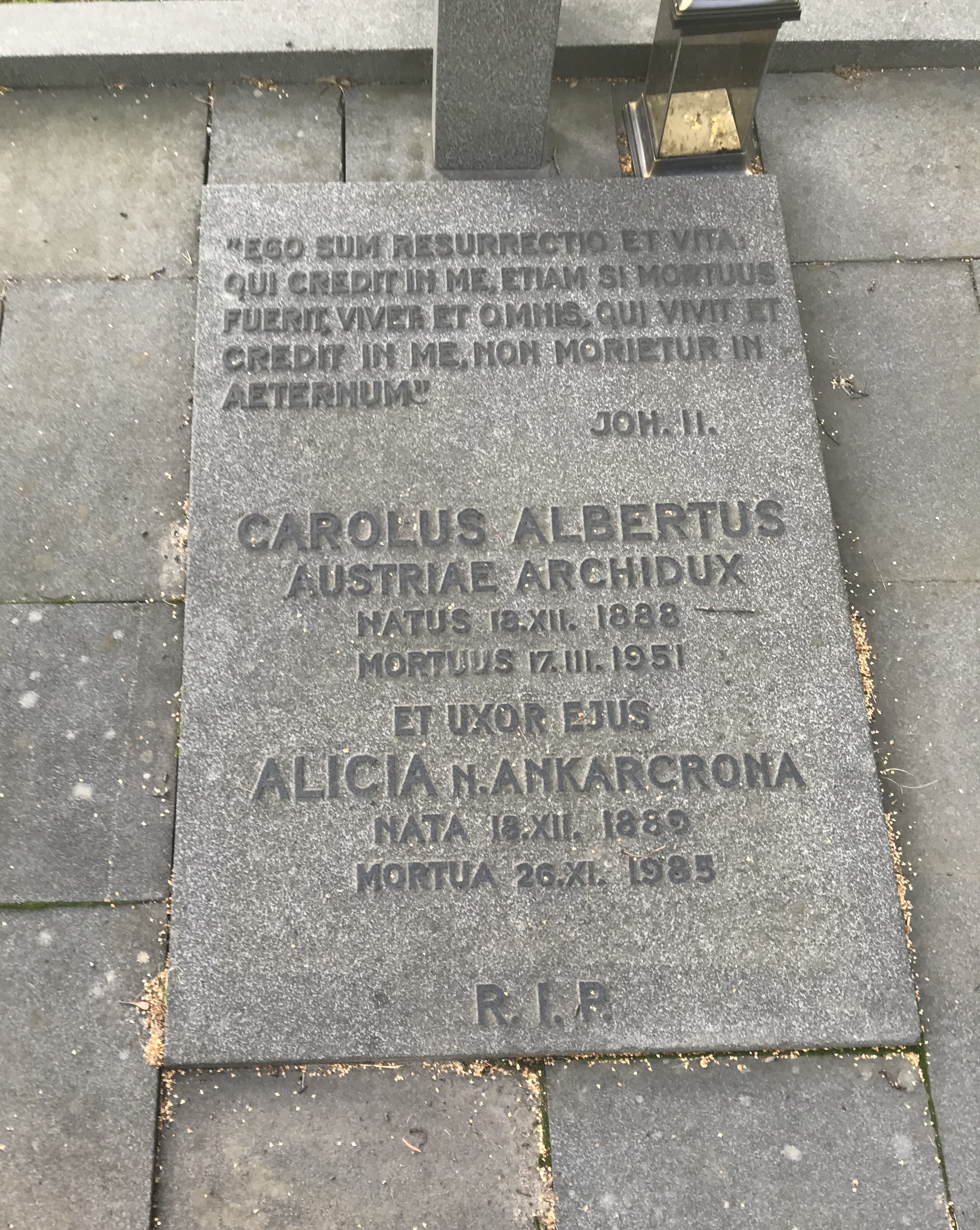
Her grave at the Roman Catholic Cemetery in Stockholm

At the end of the conflict, Alice became engaged to Archduke Karl Albrecht of Austria. As her Busk estate was devastated and still unsafe, she and her son spent some time at Karl Albrecht's family estate, the New Palace at Żywiec, in southern Poland. When the Polish-Soviet War broke out in April 1919, Karl Albrecht joined the Polish army and Alice and Kasimir again returned to Busk. Once more, fighting took place around the estate while they lived there.

On 18 November 1920, Alice married Karl Albrecht in the palace chapel at Żywiec, and soon afterwards the couple settled at the estate, where they lived together with the parents of Karl Albrecht, Archduke Charles Stephen of Austria and Archduchess Maria Theresa of Austria, as well as his brother Archduke Leo Karl of Austria and his wife Marie-Clothilde de Thuillières. Alice's husband worked with the administration of the estate. During these years, Alice Habsburg also spent part of her time and money trying to improve the estate at Busk.

The couple had two daughters, Maria Christina (1923 – 2012 and Renata (1931 – 2024), and two sons, Karl Stefan (1921 – 2018) and Albrecht (1926 - 1928), who died in infancy. The couple gave their children an essentially Polish upbringing, with Polish as their first language. Both parents also fully supported independent Poland. Her husband supported Polish organisations and donated money and machine-guns to the Polish Army. Alice Habsburg would later, to the Gestapo, state her nationality as "Polish". She has also stated that to give her children a Polish upbringing "was a simple act of loyalty to the country that had opened its borders to us and given us back our property and standing".

== World War II ==
When Nazi Germany invaded Poland in 1939 Alice's husband joined the Polish army. Alice remained at the estate at Żywiec. On 3 September German soldiers reached the estate and began to use it as a barracks. Officers from the SS and Gestapo followed suit and interrogated Alice for the first time. She believed her husband and children were safe at the estate in Busk, but when the Soviet Union also invaded Poland she left Żywiec to try to find them.

Eventually her three sons managed to flee the country and later joined the Polish Armed Forces in the West. Her husband was arrested by the Nazi German authorities and sent to prison. Both he and his wife were pressed to give up their loyalties to Poland and instead join or support the Nazi regime, but both refused. Because of this Karl Albrecht was kept imprisoned in Cieszyn until December 1941, when he was released for health reasons and international pressure. Alice had petitioned the Swedish Government and Sven Hedin to work for the release of her husband, and several royal or ex-royal families in Europe had done the same.

Some time after the German invasion, Alice Habsburg joined the Polish resistance organization, the Union of Armed Struggle (later transformed into the Home Army). She was likely appalled by the atrocities committed by the Nazi regime against the population as much as by her own and her husband's experiences. On several occasions she witnessed the public executions of partisans. Until early autumn 1940 she was allowed to remain in the palace of Żywiec, but was restricted to one room and kept under surveillance. While living there she witnessed how the palace was systematically plundered by Nazi authorities. In an interrogation by the Gestapo in 1942, she would state that "that you have seized our private property is something I still consider an act of violence and a great injustice" and furthermore that "through my long stay in Poland [I] now feel complete solidarity with the people of Poland. I espouse myself completely to Polish nationality and can only admire their courageous attitude".

Her tasks as a member of the resistance movement included delivering messages and acting as a courier and disseminating information and listening to and disseminating news from abroad, especially the BBC, all of which could have earned her the death penalty. She was frequently interrogated but never arrested, and maintained that she believed the Nazi authorities never suspected that she was an active member of the resistance movement. During the war she did not tell anyone outside the Home Army of her engagement there, not even her husband or children.

In autumn 1940 she was forced to leave her estate and to go live in Wisła, where she stood under surveillance. Even so, she enjoyed a relative degree of freedom and managed to travel to both Berlin and Cologne, despite this being forbidden. She also kept acting as a courier for the resistance. In October 1942 Alice, together with her husband and their daughter Renata, were transferred to a labour camp in Strausberg, in Germany. Alice refused to perform her assigned duties, stating that "Although no work is shameful, I refuse to work for the Hitlerite regime"; an act of disobedience that went nonetheless unpunished. She was explicitly forbidden from interacting with the Polish forced laborers at the camp. Her husband, now released from prison, was however allowed to leave and, being in poor health after his treatment in prison, went to a hospital in Vienna upon his wife's insistence. He returned to Strausberg to be with his family in summer 1943. Alice Habsburg stayed in Straussberg until the end of the war. She and her husband were liberated, together with many other camp inmates, on 10 April 1945 by American troops.

== Later life ==
In 1946 she was awarded the Polish Cross of Valour by the Polish government. On 15 December 1949 she was accorded the hereditary title of Princess of Altenburg by the head of the House of Habsburg-Lorraine.

The communist regime in Poland did not however restore any of the property to the family, and Alice and her husband and daughters, significantly impoverished, eventually settled in Sweden, helped by Alice's Swedish relatives. She lived there in a two-room, second floor apartment. She died in Saltsjöbaden in 1985 and was buried at the Roman Catholic Cemetery at Norra begravningsplatsen in Stockholm.

In 1963, she received an award on behalf of the Polish government-in-exile on the instigation of Tadeusz Bór-Komorowski.

== Issue ==
By her first husband, Count Ludwik Badeni (1873-1916):

- Count Kasimir Stanislaw Badeni (b. 1912), became a member of the Dominican Order.

By her second husband, Archduke Karl Albrecht of Austria (1888-1951):

- Prince Karl-Stefan of Altenburg (Balice, Poland, 29 October 1921 – Stockholm, 20 June 2018); married in Geneva, Switzerland, on 18 September 1952 his first cousin, Maria-Louise Victoria Katharina Elisabeth af Petersens (Stockholm, 4 November 1910 – Östervik, Sweden, 27 May 1998), and had issue:
  - Princess Maria-Christina of Altenburg (b. Stockholm, 21 April 1953), unmarried and without issue
  - Prince Karl-Albrecht of Altenburg (Stockholm, 24 October 1956 – Zürich, 26 May 1957)
- Princess Maria-Christina of Altenburg (Żywiec, 8 December 1923 – 2 October 2012, Żywiec), unmarried and without issue.
- Prince Karl-Albrecht of Altenburg (Żywiec, 4 August 1926 – 19 December 1928)
- Princess Renata of Altenburg (Żywiec, 13 April 1931 – 18 June 2024), married in Stockholm on 26 June 1957 Spanish nobleman and a diplomat Eduardo de Zulueta y Dato (Paris, France, 4 December 1923 – 28 July 2020), and had issue.
