= Count Kasimir Felix Badeni =

Austrian politician (1846–1909)

Count Kasimir Felix Graf Badeni
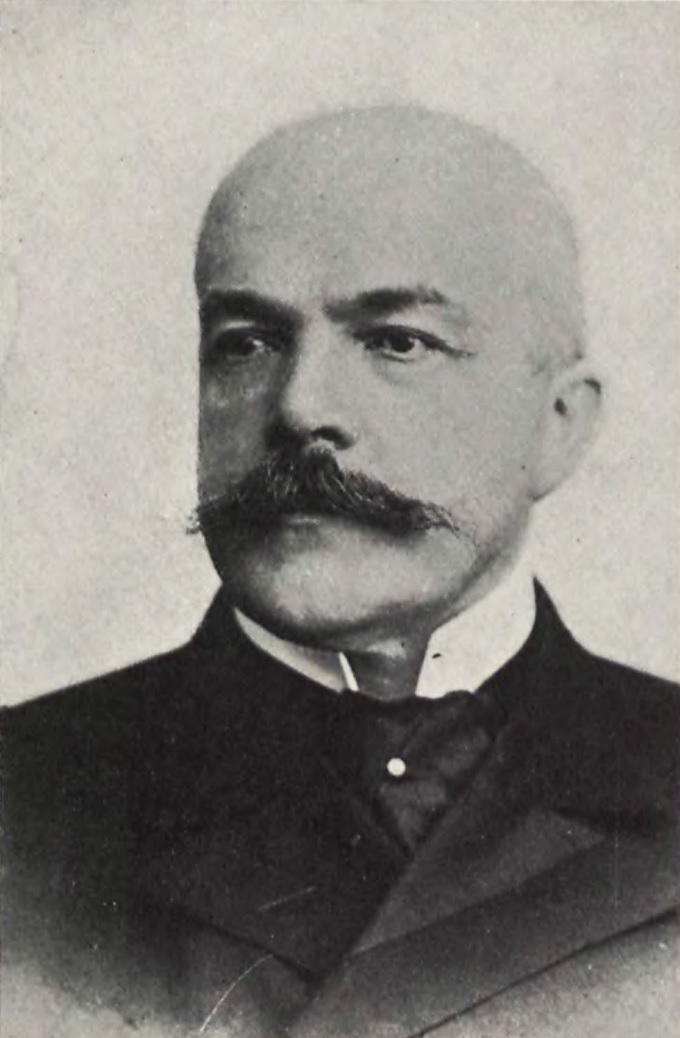

Minister-President of Austria
- In office 30 September 1895 – 28 November 1897
- Monarch: Franz Joseph I
- Preceded by: Erich Graf von Kielmansegg
- Succeeded by: Paul Gautsch Freiherr von Frankenthurn

Personal details
- Born: 14 October 1846 Surochów, Galicia, Austrian Empire
- Died: 9 July 1909 (aged 62) Krasne, Galicia, Austria-Hungary

Count Kasimir Felix Badeni (German: Kasimir Felix Graf von Badeni; Polish: Kazimierz Feliks hrabia Badeni; 14 October 1846 – 9 July 1909), a member of the Polish noble House of Badeni, was an Austrian statesman, who served as Minister-President of Cisleithania from 1895 until 1897.

Many people in Austria, especially Emperor Franz Joseph, had placed great hope in Badeni's efforts to reform the electoral system and the language legislation in order to solve some fundamental problems of the multinational state, which eventually failed.

== Biography ==
Kasimir Felix Badeni was born in Surochów near Jarosław (Jaroslau) in the Austrian Kingdom of Galicia and Lodomeria, the son of Count Władysław Badeni (1819–1888) and his wife, Cecylia Mier (1825–1897). Badeni studied law at the Jagiellonian University in Kraków and joined the Austrian civil service in 1866, serving in the Ministry of the Interior and in the Ministry of Agriculture. In 1871 he was appointed district commissioner (Bezirkshauptmann) in Żółkiew, later in Rzeszów. From 1879 he worked as court councillor and delegate of the Galician stadtholder in Kraków.

Badeni retired to his country estates in 1866. Nevertheless, two years later he was appointed k.k. stadtholder of Galicia by Emperor Franz Joseph. During his tenure, he played a key role in the rapprochement between the Polish elite and the Ruthenians that came to be known as the "New Era". He was devoted to the Habsburg Monarchy and the Emperor as a firm conservative, which combined with his successes in Galicia impressed Franz Joseph.

On 21 October 1871, he married Maria Skrzyńska (1850–1937), the only daughter of Ludwik Skrzyński and his wife, Seweryna Fredro. Their son, Count Ludwik Józef Władysław Badeni (1873–1916), a diplomat working at the Austro-Hungarian legation in Stockholm, was married to Alice Elisabeth Ankarcrona (1889–1985), a daughter of the Swedish noble Oscar Carl Gustav Ankarcrona. After Badeni's death, Alice secondly married Archduke Karl Albrecht of Austria. They also had a daughter, Countess Wanda Badeni (1874–1950), who married firstly to Count Adam Krasiński (d. 1909) and secondly to Count Zygmunt Zamoyski (1875–1931).

== Presidency ==
Badeni came to power in Austria after the failure of Minister-President Alfred III zu Windisch-Grätz's coalition ministry of conservative and liberals. Keenly aware of the growing tensions within the Empire due to ethnic rivalries and the political agitation of socialists and nationalists, Badeni expressed doubt as to the ability of Austria-Hungary to wage war effectively. He claimed "a state of nationalities cannot wage war without danger to itself."

=== Electoral reform ===
In 1896 he succeeded in implementing a form of universal male suffrage but made it palatable to the ruling interests of the Empire. To the previous four classes of voters, which depended on the amount of taxes each individual paid, his reform added a fifth class to include every adult male below the five-guilder threshold set for the fourth class in the 1882 Taaffe reform.

The electoral reform had far-reaching effects: the newly established fifth class encompassed 72 of the 425 seats in the lower house of the Imperial Council (Reichsrat) and most mandates went to the Social Democrats, the populist Christian Social Party, and also to German nationalists. In a short time, the Imperial Council developed from an Assembly of Notables to a gathering of definitive parliamentary groups with a strong party discipline.

=== Language conflict ===
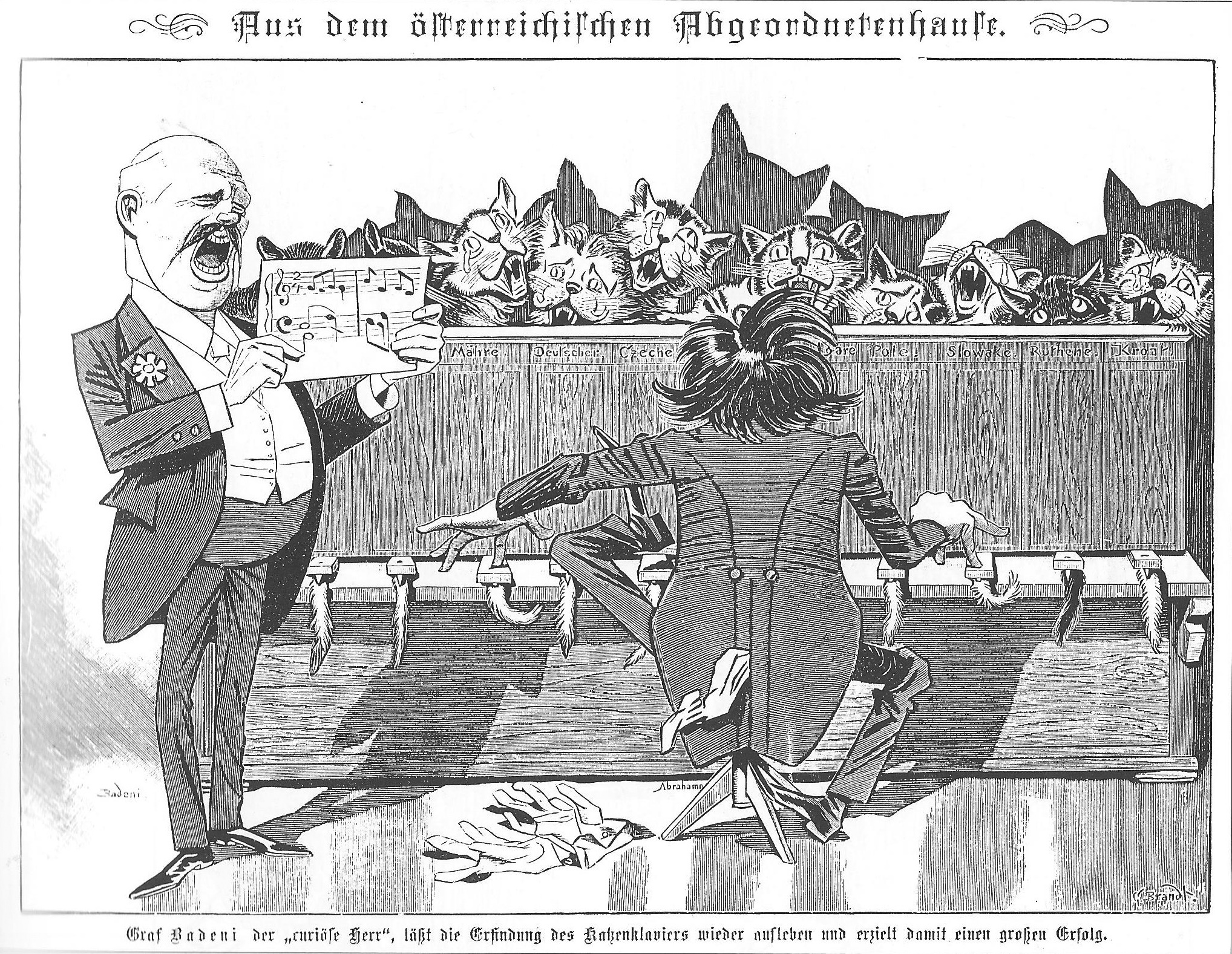
Count Badeni the "curious gentleman", revives the invention of the cat organ and thus achieves a great success. Caricature published in Kladderadatsch (1897)

Badeni courted controversy when, in an attempt to gain the support of the Young Czech faction in the Reichsrat, he addressed the language issue in Bohemia. His ordinance of 5 April 1897 declared "that Czech and German should be the languages of the 'inner service' throughout Bohemia." This meant that civil servants in the province would have to know both Czech and German, since government business would be conducted in both languages for internal Bohemian affairs. Germans in Bohemia were outraged, since this effectively excluded the majority of them from government jobs; Czechs learned German in school, but Germans had usually little to no knowledge of the Czech language.

Late-19th-century Germans in Austria-Hungary, as a general rule, wanted the Empire to maintain its German character established during the period of Germanization under Joseph II, Holy Roman Emperor in the late 18th century, so they resisted the demands of the other ethnic groups for linguistic recognition. Badeni's ordinance was seen by Germans as the "last straw" in a series of concessions. Badeni was not prepared for the level of animosity the Germans in Bohemia and elsewhere in the Empire directed at him due to his reform.

The fringe German Nationalist Party, headed by Georg Schönerer, hoping to destabilize the Empire and join the German lands of Austria to the new German Empire, disrupted parliamentary proceedings and instigated violent protests. Although most Germans of Austria had no sympathy for the Nationalist Party's cause, they participated in street protests across the Austro-Hungarian Empire, hoping to have the ordinance repealed. Obstructionism by German nationalists slowed or stopped parliamentary business in the Reichsrat and riots erupted in Vienna, Graz, Salzburg, and the Alpine provinces. Riots took place also in Prague and martial law was put into effect there.

=== Resignation ===
Amidst this political turmoil, in November 1897, Emperor Franz Joseph, frightened by the mass agitation of some of the most important segments of society, dismissed Badeni. His fall, however, did not end the political and ethnic problems within the Empire and for several years, while the Reichsrat met occasionally, the government ruled largely through emergency decree. Badeni's language ordinances were repealed in 1899, disappointing Czechs and failing to appease German nationalists.

Some commentators of the time felt, that Badeni was unaccustomed to the political dynamics of the more-industrialized western part of the Empire; he was used to the provincial social relations of Galicia, where he was a landowner. That was given as an explanation for Badeni's political blunder. In fact Badeni believed that the Czechs were growing as a nation and their national ambitions would sooner or later have to be accommodated within the Austro-Hungarian Empire, as the ambitions of the Hungarians had been decades previously. Badeni was one of the few politicians who saw that without rapprochement between different nations within the Austro-Hungarian state, the Empire would fall apart.

== Honours ==
- Austria-Hungary:
  - Knight of the Iron Crown, 3rd Class, 1882
  - Commander of the Order of Franz Joseph, with Star, 1886
  - Grand Cross of the Imperial Order of Leopold, 1891
- Holy See: Grand Cross of St. Gregory the Great
- Kingdom of Romania: Grand Cross of the Star of Romania
- Russian Empire: Knight of the White Eagle
- Kingdom of Serbia: Grand Cross of the White Eagle

Preceded by Erich von Kielmansegg	Minister-President of Austria; 1895-1897	Succeeded by Paul Gautsch von Frankenthurn
