= Gabriel Janowski =

Polish politician (born 1947)

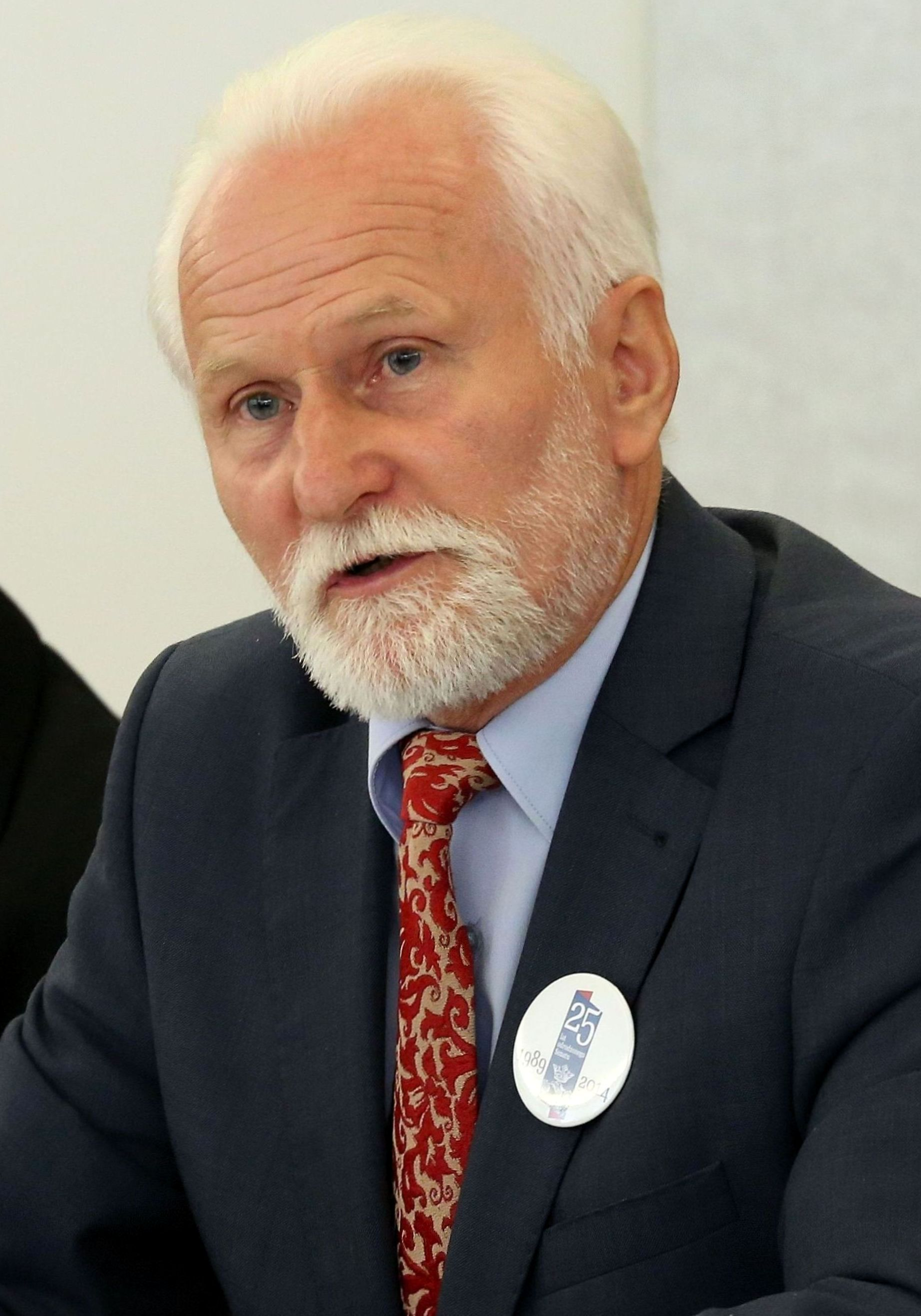
- Gabriel Janowski in 2014

Deputy of the Sejm
- In office 1997 – 2005
- Constituency: 18 Siedlce (2001–2005); 39 Siedlce (1997–2001)
- In office 1991 – 1993
- Constituency: 26 Siedlce

Minister of Agriculture and Food Economy
- In office 23 December 1991 – 8 April 1993
- President: Lech Wałęsa
- Prime Minister: Jan Krzysztof Bielecki, Jan Olszewski, Waldemar Pawlak, Hanna Suchocka
- Preceded by: Adam Tański
- Succeeded by: Janusz Byliński (acting)

Member of the I Senate
- In office 1989 – 1991
- Constituency: Siedlce

Personal details
- Born: 22 April 1947 (age 79) Konstantów, Poland
- Party: Congress of the New Right
- Other political affiliations: League of Polish Families (2005-2007); Solidarity Electoral Action (1997-2001); Peasants' Agreement (1991-1993); Solidarity Citizens' Committee (1989-1991)

Gabriel Janowski (born 22 April 1947 in Konstantów) is a Polish politician and activist of opposition in Poland. His first term as a politician was as senator in the Senate, then as a deputy in the first, third and fourth terms of the Sejm. From 1991 to 1993 he was the Minister of Agriculture and Rural Development.

On 20 January 2000, before a debate concerning the dismissal of the Minister of Treasury Emil Wąsacz, Janowski was accused of behaving strangely by his press secretary. Janowski stated this was because someone had drugged him.

== Curiosities ==
- A fragment of Wolność Słowa (Freedom of Word) satiric song by musical group Püdelsi is about Gabriel Janowski - Gabriel Janowski przedawkował proszki, śmiesznie podskakuje, wszystkich dziś całuje (Gabriel Janowski has overdosed on drugs, he's jumping funnily and today he kisses everyone).
