= Adlercreutz =

Scandinavian noble family

- Swedish and Finnish noble family
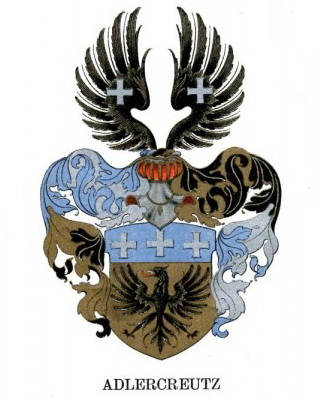
- Escutcheon of the Adlercreutz family hanging in the House of Nobility
- Country: Finland, Sweden
- Current region: South America (mainly Argentina), Western Europe (mainly Sweden and Finland)
- Titles: List: Baron Adlercreutz (1808); Count Adlercreutz (1814)

The Adlercreutz family (Swedish pronunciation: [a:dlerkröjts]) is a Swedish and Finnish noble family.

== Overview ==
Its oldest known ancestor is Swedish speaking Finn, Erik Markusson, dead 1654, who was a farmer in Biskops, Iso-Teutari, Lohja, Uusimaa, Finland. His son Tomas Eriksson Teuterström (1643–1710) served king Charles XI and Charles XII in the Treasury and was knighted on 26 September 1700 in Karlshamn by King Charles XII of Sweden with the name Adlercreutz, and was introduced at Swedish House of Nobility, Riddarhuset in 1703 with the number 1382, which has later been changed to 1386 B.

Among the members of the Swedish noble family was major general, later general of the cavalry and one of the lords of the realm, count Carl Johan Adlercreutz (1757–1815). On 30 June 1808 he was, as commander of the Sword Order, elevated into the then second class, the class of knights, and his family became a commander family with the number 1386 A. The commander family includes the baronial family Adlercreutz and the comital family Adlercreutz.

Two members of the family were immatriculated in the Finnish House of Nobility on 17 September 1818 as noble family number 97.

Other members of the family include Swedish prime minister Axel Gustav Adlercreutz, professor of law Axel Adlercreutz and professor of medicin Herman Adlercreutz as well as the modernist architect Eric Adlercreutz.

Erik Adlercreutz, a member of the Adlercreutz family, moved in 1917 to Argentina; establishing an Argentinian branch of the Adlercreutz family. In 2014, there were 37 holders of the surname Adlercreutz in Argentina.

== See also ==
- Adlercreutzia
- The National Biography of Finland
- Swedish-speaking Finns
