= Gwala Torbiński =

Polish Dominican friar

Servant of God Gwala Torbiński OP
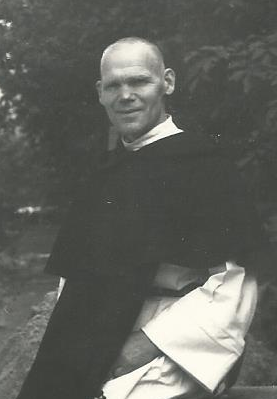
- Born: 14 February 1908; Konstantów, Gmina Błonie, Lublin, Poland
- Died: 13 June 1999 (aged 91); Kraków, Poland

Gwala Torbiński, OP (born Walenty Torbiński; 14 February 1908 – 13 July 1999) was a Polish Dominican cooperator-brother and mystic considered for beatification. He was regarded as a "silent preacher" and "one of the four spiritual pillars of the Krakow Dominican convent."

== Biography ==
=== Early life ===
Torbiński was born into a peasant family on 14 February 1908 in Konstantów near Biłgoraj. He finished his education in the fourth grade of primary school.

=== Religious life ===
Torbiński joined the Dominican Order as a postulant in May Lviv, Ukraine in 1933, just before the visitation of the Dominican General and the reform of the Polish province. He was invested in the cloth in January 1934 and became a lay brother (as cooperating brothers were called at that time). Even before his perpetual vows, he managed to change his service several times: he was a sacristan, an agricultural worker, and a typesetter in a Dominican publishing house in Lviv.

He spent the war in Lviv, and in January 1941, despite the Dominicans being repressed by the Soviets and the lay brothers being urged to leave the order, he made his perpetual vows. In 1946, the Soviet authorities dissolved the Lviv monastery and the brothers left for Kraków. Torbiński wandered around the country for a while, living in Prudnik, Tarnobrzeg, Lublin and Warsaw.

==== Librarian ====
In 1960, Torbiński was assigned to Kraków where he finally settled. At the monastery, he served as the librarian's assistant. He learned by heart the names and surnames of seminarians from all ages, as well as the numbers of their cells in the monastery. When they ordered books, even though he didn't have to, he brought them to the right door so they didn't have to go down to the reading room.

He was remembered to a quiet and reserved person. Although he only completed four years of a rural primary school, he developed a good intellectual formation through his curiosity about the truth, study in breaks between classes and his incredible memory. He learned foreign languages himself (particularly Latin, French and German), surprised seminarians with his knowledge of books, and sometimes even advised them on what to read.

The Dominicans knew that if Torbiński was not in the library or in his cell, he was in the chapel. There, he kept watch the place at night, praying constantly, reciting the rosary or using his Latin prayer book. He received Holy Communion with great devotion and served at mass, sometimes several times a day, if necessary.

==== Mysticism ====
For more than twenty years before his death, Torbiński suffered from bone cancer. He survived, but from then on he suffered from constant recurrences of anemia and began to have problems with his movement (this was one of the reasons he did not wear a habit) and his digestive system. Despite pain and difficulties, he continued to serve so that, as he wrote in one of his letters to his family, "not to eat bread for nothing."

He was known to be very accurate in recognizing the characters of the people he came into contact with, and he very rarely talked about his spiritual life, but its intensity was expressed externally as witnessed by his brothers in the community.

=== Death ===
He died in the odor of sanctity on July 13, 1999, in Kraków, at the age of 91. He was buried in the Dominican tomb at the Rakowicki Cemetery in Kraków.

== Veneration ==
On 28 July 2018, Archbishop Marek Jędraszewski of Kraków in collaboration with the Dominican Province of Poland began the initial steps for Gwala Torbiński's beatification process alongside the Dominican academic Joachim Badeni.
