= King-in-Council =

Constitutional monarch in an executive capacity

The King-in-Council or the Queen-in-Council, depending on the gender of the reigning monarch, is a constitutional term in a number of states. In a general sense, it refers to the monarch exercising executive authority, usually in the form of approving orders, on the advice of the country's privy council or executive council.

In countries where the reigning monarch is represented by a viceroy, derivative terms are used instead, such as Governor in Council or Lieutenant Governor in Council.

== Norway ==
In Norway, the King in Council (Norwegian: Kongen i statsråd) refers to the meetings of the king and the Council of State (the Cabinet), wherein matters of importance and major decisions are made. The council meets at the Royal Palace, normally every Friday. These meetings are chaired by the monarch or, if he is ill or abroad, crown prince(-ess) (the monarch's heir). In Norway's constitution, King in Council refers to the formal Government of Norway, whereas merely King means the appointed ministry that the law refers to may alone act with complete authority on the matter assigned in the particular law.

A decision that is taken in the State Council under the sovereign's leadership is considered to be a royal decree. If the crown prince chairs, they are crown prince resolutions. When neither the monarch nor the crown prince chairs, resolutions adopted are called government resolutions.

== Sweden ==
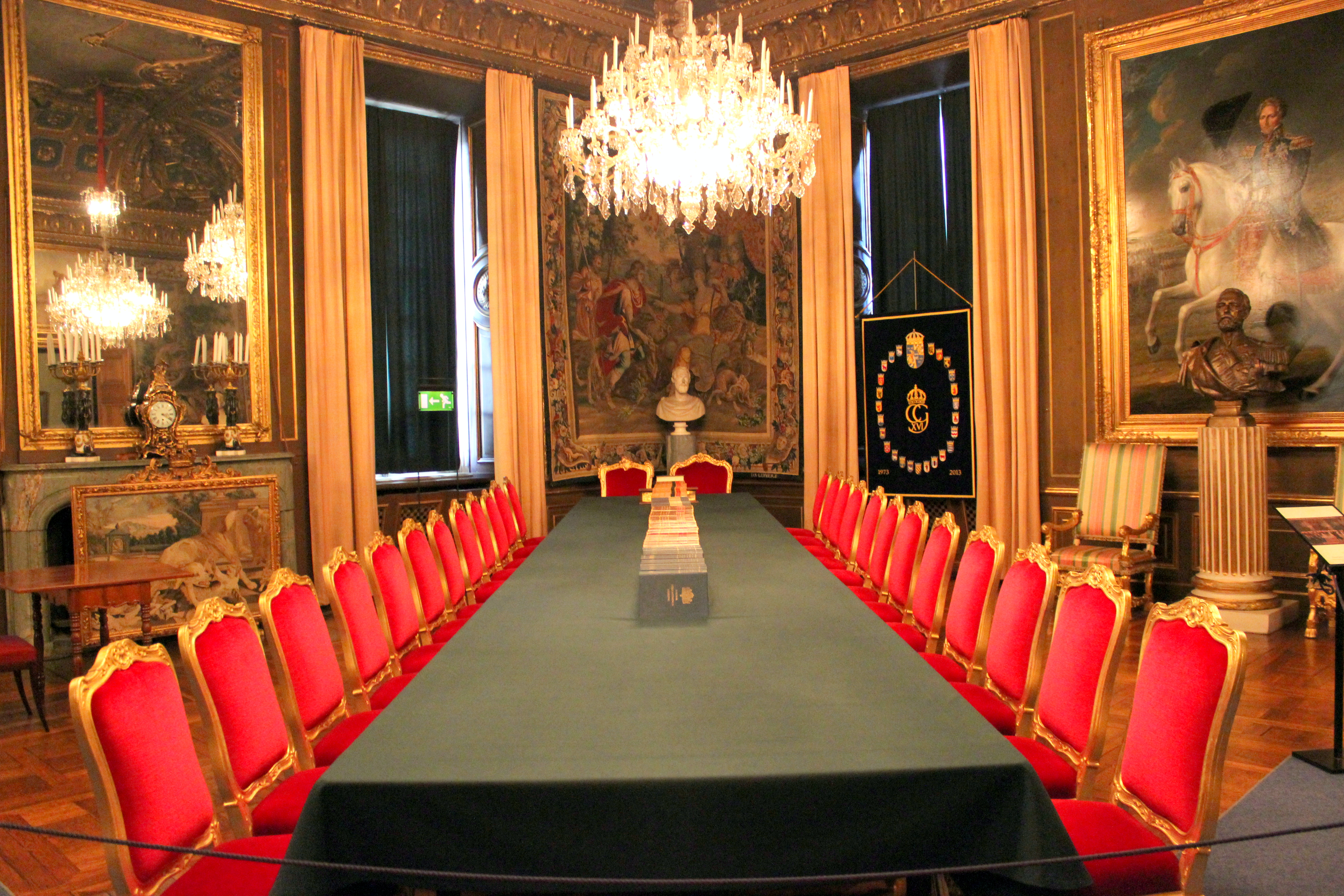
The Council Chamber (Konseljsalen) at Stockholm Palace in Sweden

In Sweden, the King in Council (Swedish: Konungen i Statsrådet), more commonly known as The Royal Majesty (Swedish: Kunglig Majestät or the short forms Kungl. Maj:t or K.M:t) was a concept of constitutional importance until 1974.

The Royal Majesty was the commonly used term to refer to the supreme executive authority under the 1809 Instrument of Government, under which the monarch made all decisions of state in the presence of his Cabinet ministers. The 1974 Instrument of Government removed the monarch from all exercise of formal political powers, which were passed to the newly created government (Swedish: Regeringen), chaired and led in all aspects by the prime minister. The monarch continues to head the Cabinet councils (the sovereign plus the members of the government) and the Council on Foreign Affairs, recognizing new cabinets (in the Council of State).

== Commonwealth realms ==
The King-in-Council is the technical term of constitutional law for the exercise of executive authority in a Commonwealth realm, denoting the monarch acting by and with the advice and consent of his or her privy council (in the United Kingdom and Canada's federal jurisdiction) or executive council (in most other Commonwealth realms and the Australian states and Canadian provinces). In those realms and dependencies where the sovereign's powers and functions are delegated to a governor-general, lieutenant governor, or governor, the term Governor-General-in-Council, Lieutenant Governor-in-Council, or Governor-in-Council may be used instead of King-in-Council, all of these terms describing the same technical process within constitutional law. The government of [jurisdiction] is commonly used as a synonym for any of the aforementioned terms, though the phrase may mean more than one thing in certain areas.

Elizabeth II, Queen of Ceylon, with her cabinet in Ceylon, 1954

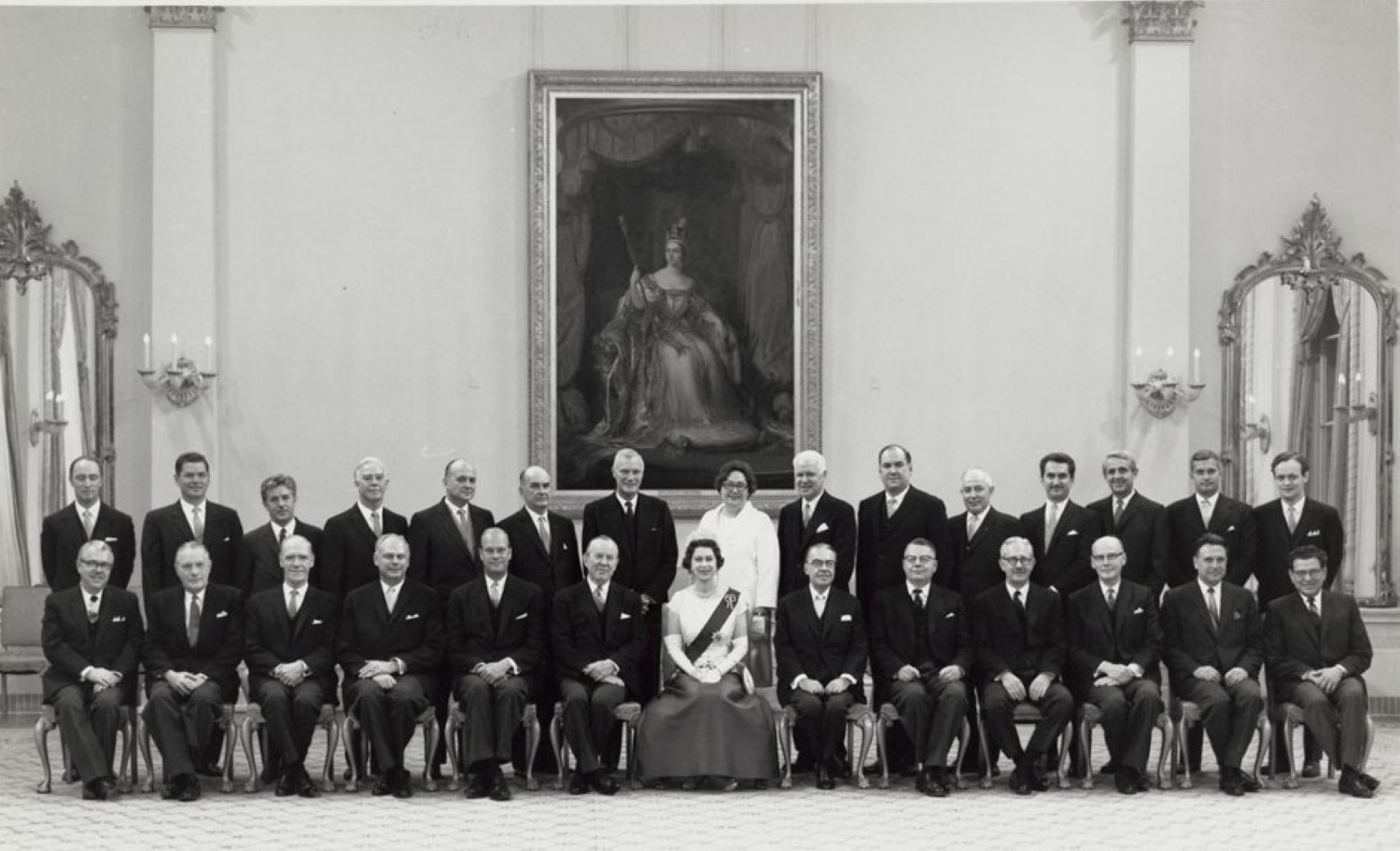
Elizabeth II, Queen of Canada, with her Cabinet, a subcommittee of the Queen's Privy Council, in Rideau Hall, 1 July 1967

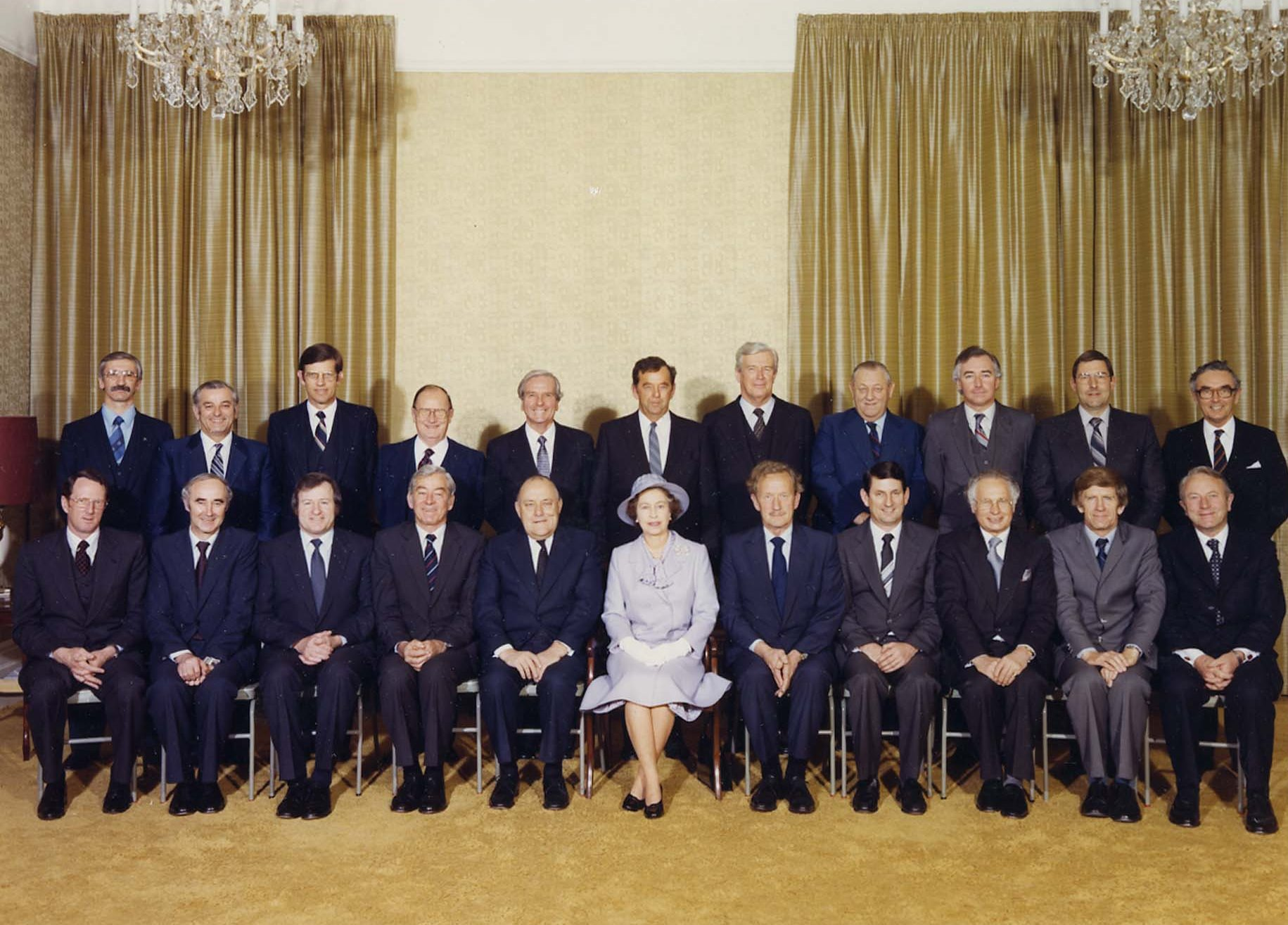
Elizabeth II, Queen of New Zealand, with her Cabinet, a subcommittee of the Executive Council, 1981

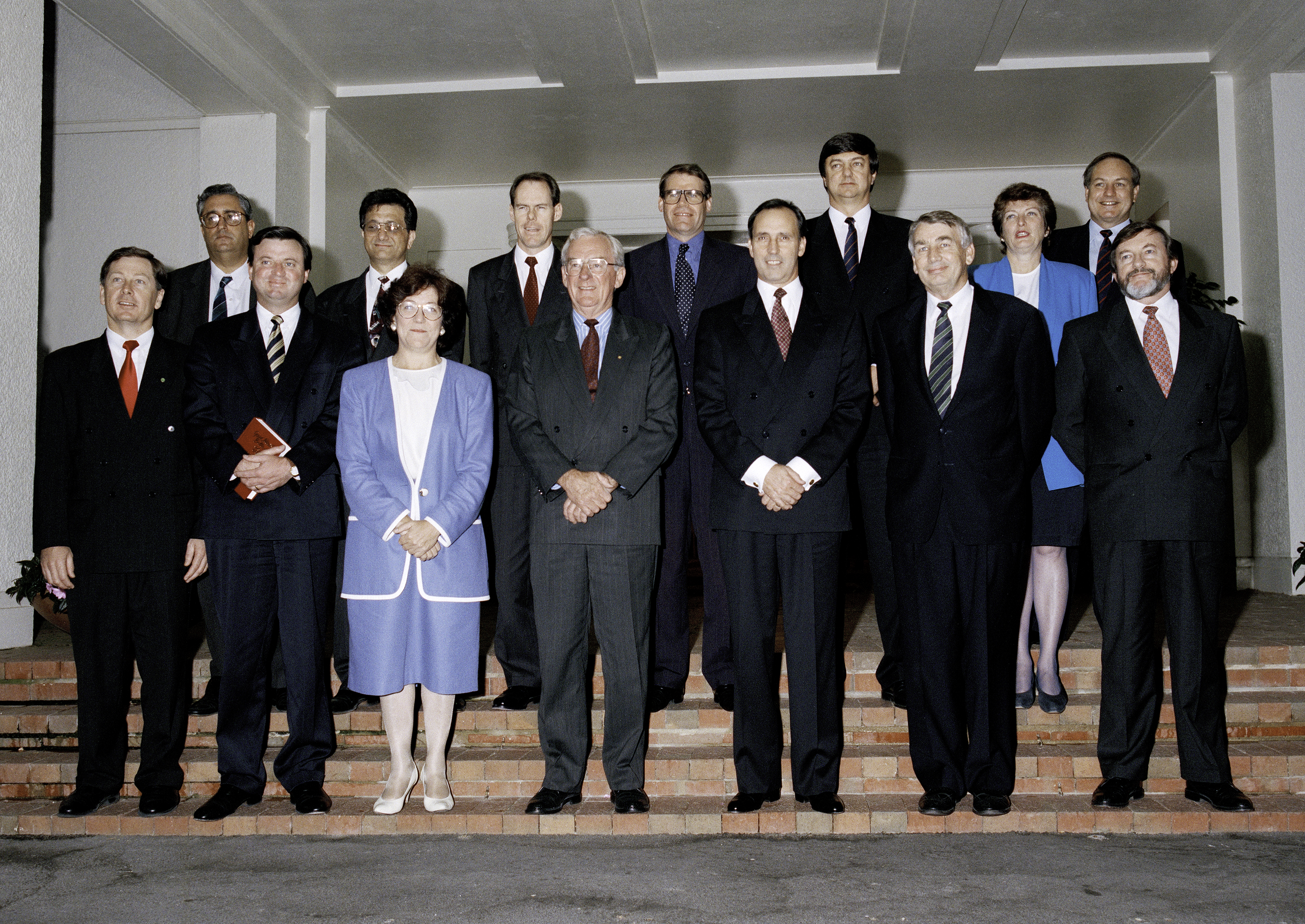
Governor-General Bill Hayden, representing Elizabeth II, Queen of Australia, with his Cabinet, a subcommittee of the Federal Executive Council, outside Government House, 25 March 1994

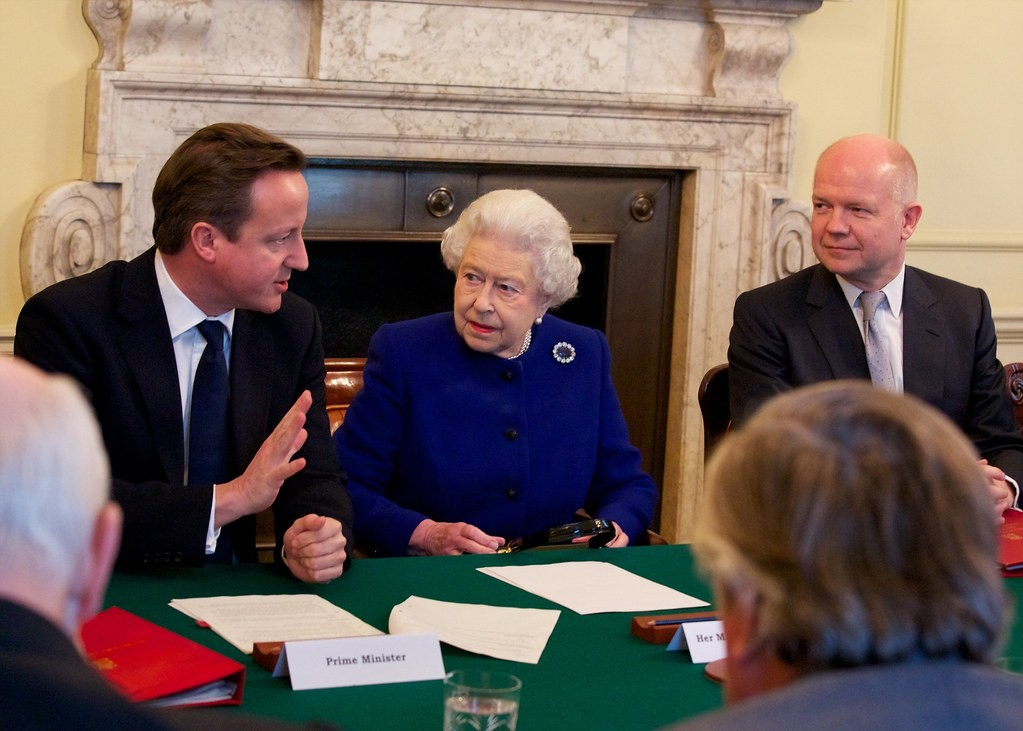
Elizabeth II, Queen of the United Kingdom, with her Cabinet, a subcommittee of the Privy Council, at 10 Downing Street, 18 December 2012

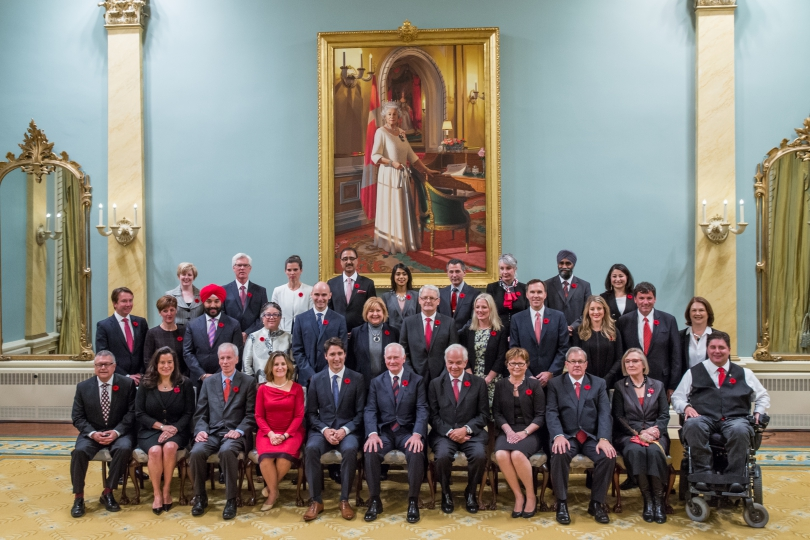
Governor General David Johnston, representing Elizabeth II, Queen of Canada, with his Cabinet at Rideau Hall, 4 November 2015

An order made by the King-in-Council is known as an order-in-council and such actions are subject to judicial review. (Note: "The source of the power to make the order-in-council was the royal prerogative. Neither Her Majesty nor the members of the Privy Council present that day (which, coincidentally, included me) considered the merits of the order. The Queen-in-Council acts upon the advice of a minister, in the present case, the Secretary of State for Foreign and Commonwealth Affairs. In reality, the order was that of the Secretary of State, although, of course, the Queen formally assented to it.") Orders-in-council may be used to implement secondary legislation, such as British statutory instruments. In practice, decisions made by the King-in-Council are almost always the formal approval to decisions made by the cabinet, a subcommittee of the privy or executive council that includes the senior ministers of the Crown and often meets without the monarch or his local representative present.

Former Commonwealth realms and dependencies often retain a similar constitutional concept; for example, President-in-Council in India or Chief Executive-in-Council in Hong Kong. Similar concepts can also be found in some non-Commonwealth countries.

== See also ==
=== Sweden ===
- Privy Council of Sweden
- Council of State (Sweden)

=== The Commonwealth ===
- King-in-Parliament
- King's Counsel
- Law officers of the Crown

=== Ireland ===
- Council of State (Ireland)
