= Archduke Karl Albrecht of Austria =

Austrian archduke and Polish Army officer

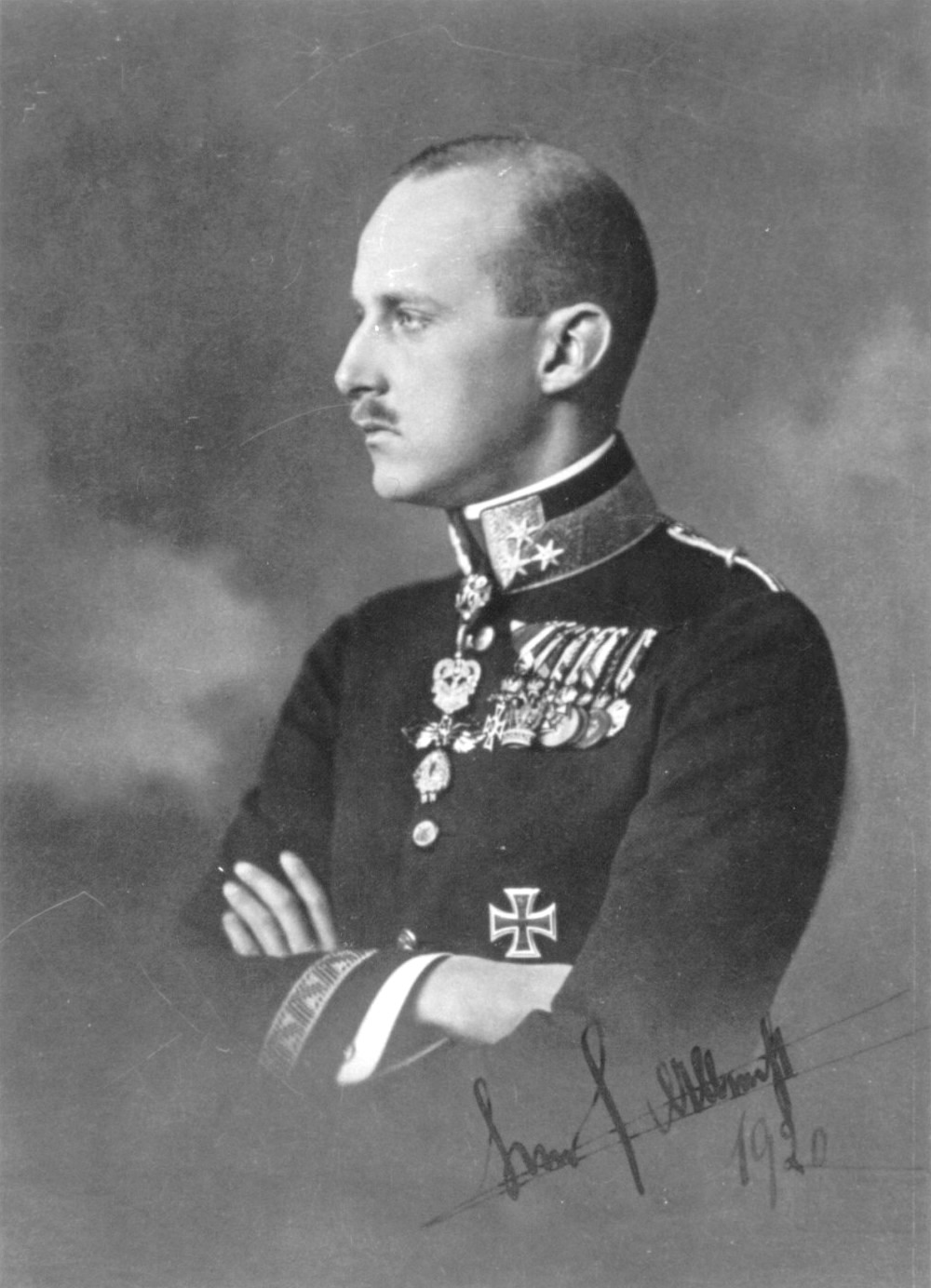
- Archduke Karl Albrecht in 1918
- Born: 18 December 1888; Pula, Austria-Hungary
- Died: 17 March 1951 (aged 62) near Stockholm, Sweden
- Spouse: Alice Elisabeth Ankarcrona (m. 1920)
- Issue: Prince Karl-Stefan; Princess Maria-Christina; Prince Karl Albrecht; Princess Renata
Names
- Karl Albrecht Nikolaus Leo Gratianus
- House: Habsburg-Lorraine
- Father: Archduke Charles Stephen of Austria
- Mother: Archduchess Maria Theresia, Princess of Tuscany

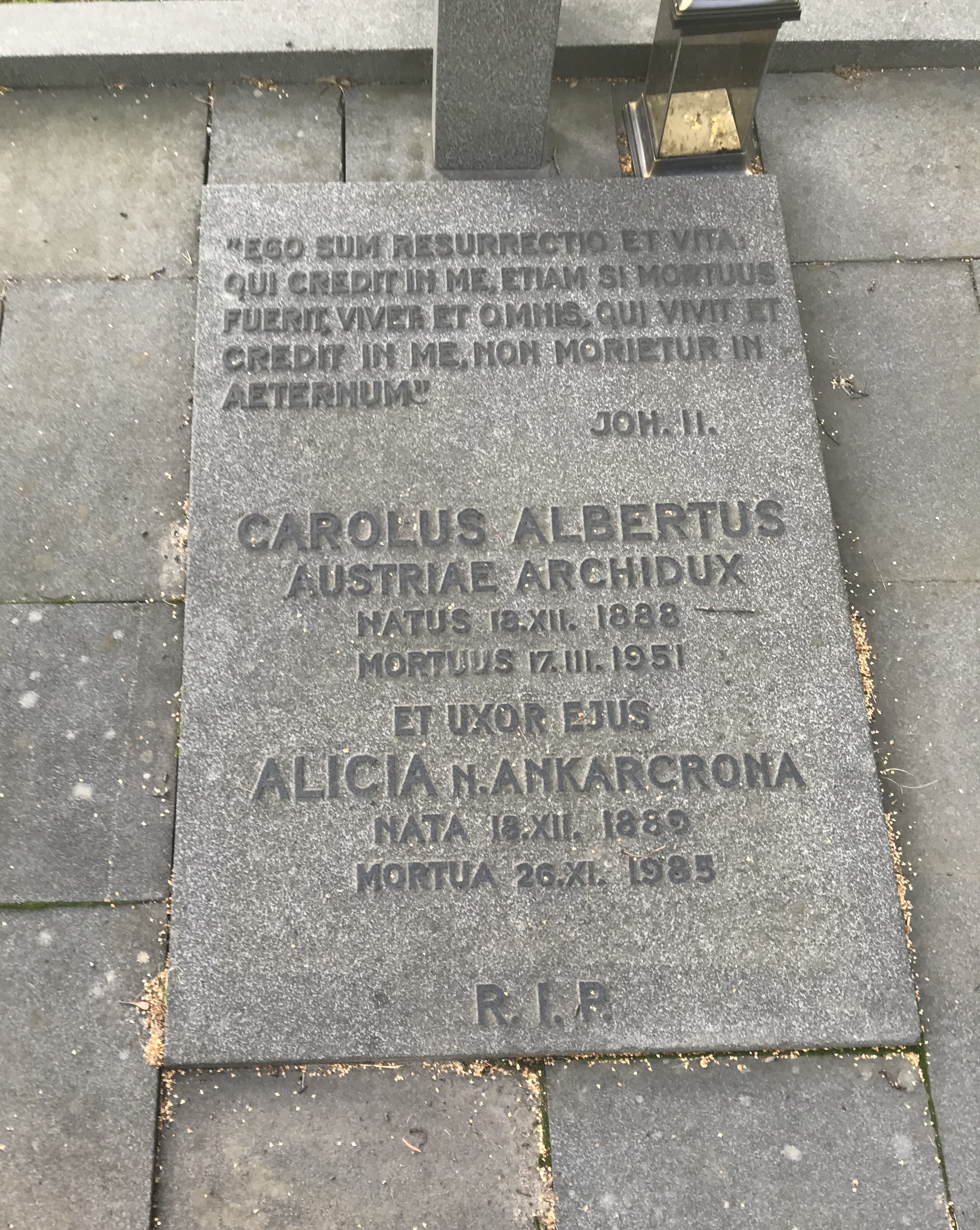
Roman Catholic Cemetery in Stockholm

Archduke Karl Albrecht of Austria-Teschen (Karl Albrecht Nikolaus Leo Gratianus von Österreich, later Karl Albrecht Habsburg-Lothringen, since 1919 – Karol Olbracht Habsburg-Lotaryński; 18 December 1888 – 17 March 1951) was an Austrian military officer, a member of the Teschen line of the House of Habsburg-Lorraine.

== Early life and career ==
He was an Austrian archduke, the oldest son of Archduke Charles Stephen and his wife, Archduchess Maria Theresia, Princess of Tuscany. Both of his parents were closely related to Franz Joseph I, Emperor of Austria.

He was a landowner in Żywiec, a colonel of artillery in both the Imperial Austro-Hungarian Army (cavalry) and the Polish Army, and the 1,175th knight of the Order of the Golden Fleece in 1910, etc.

In 1918 and again in 1939 he became a volunteer in the Polish army. He fought in the Polish–Soviet War. In 1920, he commanded the Grudziądz Fortress. During the German occupation of Poland, he declared Polish nationality and refused to sign the Volksliste. He was imprisoned in November 1939, kept in Cieszyn and tortured by the Gestapo. His wife was interned in Wisła. He emerged from prison with a loss of vision in one eye and limited mobility. In October 1942, Albrecht and his family were taken to Strausberg and confined to a forced labor camp. After liberation, he moved to Kraków and then to Sweden. His estate was confiscated in 1939 by the invading Germans, and again in 1945 by the Polish People's Republic.

== Family and children ==
On 8 November 1920 he married morganatically Alice Elisabeth Ankarcrona (born at Tullgarn, near Trosa, 18 December 1889 and died at Saltsjöbaden, near Stockholm, 26 November 1985) in the castle of Żywiec Poland. She was a daughter of Oscar Carl Gustav Ankarcrona and his wife, Anna Elisabeth Aurora Carleson (b. 1867), daughter of Edvard Henrik Carleson (1820–1912), Councilor of State of the Kingdom of Sweden. She was the widow of Count Ludwik Badeni (1873-1916), a diplomat working at the Austro-Hungarian legation in Stockholm. On 15 December 1949, Otto von Habsburg, as the Head of the House of Habsburg-Lorraine accorded her the hereditary title of "Princess of Altenburg".

Their children were:

- Prince Karl-Stefan of Altenburg (Balice, Poland, 29 October 1921 – Stockholm, 20 June 2018); married in Geneva, Switzerland, on 18 September 1952 his first cousin, Maria-Louise Victoria Katharina Elisabeth af Petersens (Stockholm, 4 November 1910 – Östervik, Sweden, 27 May 1998), and had issue:
  - Princess Maria-Christina of Altenburg (b. Stockholm, 21 April 1953), unmarried and without issue
  - Prince Karl-Albrecht of Altenburg (Stockholm, 24 October 1956 – Zürich, 26 May 1957)
- Princess Maria-Christina of Altenburg (Żywiec, 8 December 1923 – 2 October 2012, Żywiec), unmarried and without issue.
- Prince Karl-Albrecht of Altenburg (Żywiec, 4 August 1926 – 19 December 1928)
- Princess Renata of Altenburg (Żywiec, 13 April 1931 – 18 June 2024), married in Stockholm on 26 June 1957 Spanish diplomat Eduardo de Zulueta y Dato (Paris, France, 4 December 1923 – 28 July 2020), and had issue.

== Ancestry ==
Ancestors of Archduke Karl Albrecht of Austria

8. Archduke Charles, Duke of Teschen
4. Archduke Karl Ferdinand of Austria
9. Princess Henrietta of Nassau-Weilburg
2. Archduke Charles Stephen of Austria
10. Archduke Joseph, Palatine of Hungary
5. Archduchess Elisabeth Franziska of Austria
11. Duchess Maria Dorothea of Württemberg
1. Archduke Karl Albrecht of Austria
12. Leopold II, Grand Duke of Tuscany
6. Archduke Karl Salvator, Prince of Tuscany
13. Princess Marie Antoinette of the Two Sicilies
3. Archduchess Maria Theresia, Princess of Tuscany
14. Ferdinand II of the Two Sicilies
7. Princess Maria Immaculata of Bourbon-Two Sicilies
15. Maria Theresa of Austria

== Honours ==
- Order of Polonia Restituta
- Cross of Valor
- Knight of the Order of the Golden Fleece
- Iron Cross 1st & 2nd class (1914 version)
