= Eduardo de Zulueta y Dato =

Spanish diplomat (1923–2020)

Eduardo de Zulueta y Dato (4 December 1923 – 28 July 2020) was a Spanish nobleman and a diplomat.

== Early life and ancestry ==
Born in Paris, son of Ernesto de Zulueta e Isasi (1892–1969), Ambassador of Spain to Stockholm and his wife, María de la Concepción Dato y Barrenechea (1890-1973), daughter of Eduardo Dato e Iradier, Prime Minister of Spain and his wife, María del Carmen Barrenechea y Montegui, Duchess of Dato, (1890–1973).

== Career ==
He was a Licentiate in Law and a Diplomat. He was Ambassador of Spain in Luxembourg and Algeria, Permanent Observer Ambassador of Spain to the Organization of American States in Washington, D.C., Director-General of Ecclesiastical Affairs at the Ministry of Justice, Chief of Protocol of the International Exposition of Seville, Director of International Affairs of the Instituto Cervantes, etc., and was created Grand Cross of the Order of St. Raymond of Peñafort and the Order of St. Sylvester of the Holy See, Commander of the Order of Civil Merit of Spain and the Order of Isabel the Catholic and Knight of the Order of Charles III.

He was married to Princess Renata of Altenburg (1931-2024), youngest daughter of Archduke Karl Albrecht of Austria and his Swedish wife, wife Alice Elisabeth Ankarcrona.

== Death ==
He died in July 2020 at the age of 96.
