= Adlercreutz (baronial family) =

Baronial family branch of commander family

The baronial family Adlercreutz is a branch of the commander family Adlercreutz.

The major general, later the general of the cavalry and one of the lords of the realm, count Carl Johan Adlercreutz (1757-1815), was created a Swedish baron together with his three sons Fredrik Thomas Adlercreutz (1793-1852), Carl Gustaf Adlercreutz (1799-1883) and Johan Henrik Adlercreutz (1800-1841).

Together with this family belongs the comital family Adlercreutz.

The present baron Adlercreutz is Magnus Adlercreutz, born 11 March 1977, who became a baron at his birth, since his father had already inherited the comital title.
