= Surochów =

- Village
- Location within Poland
- Coordinates: 50°2′N 22°46′E
- Country: Poland
- Voivodeship: Subcarpathian
- County: Jarosław
- Gmina: Jarosław
- Website: http://surochow.pl

Surochów [suˈrɔxuf] is a village in the administrative district of Gmina Jarosław, within Jarosław County, Subcarpathian Voivodeship, in south-eastern Poland.

== People ==
- Kasimir Felix Badeni (1846–1909), Austrian politician and Polish noble from Galicia
- Aleksander Fredro (1793–1876), Polish poet, playwright and author
