= Hölö =

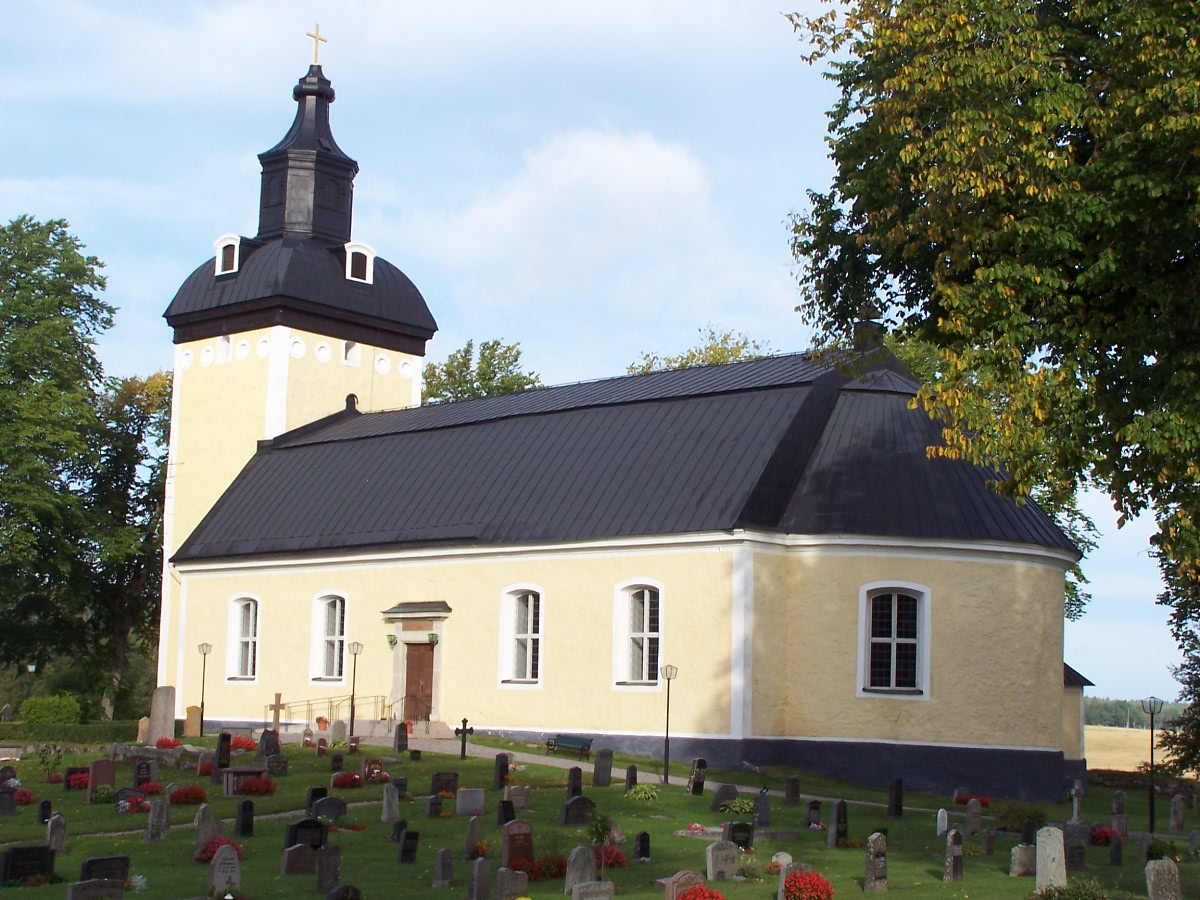
- Hölö church

- Location within Stockholm Location within Sweden
- Coordinates: 59°01′27″N 17°32′21″E
- Country Sweden: Sweden
- Province: Södermanland
- County: Stockholm County
- Municipality: Södertälje Municipality

Area
  - Total: 1.33 km^{2} (0.51 sq mi)

Population (31 December 2020)
  - Total: 1,602
  - Density: 1,200/km^{2} (3,120/sq mi)
- Time zone: UTC+1 (CET)
  - Summer (DST): UTC+2 (CEST)

Hölö is a locality situated in Södertälje Municipality, Stockholm County, Sweden with 1,400 inhabitants in 2010. It lies near the lake Långsjön and is slightly north of Vagnhärad and south of Södertälje.

== History ==
Hölö stopped being its own municipality in 1971, when it was incorporated with Södertälje municipality. Formerly Hölö municipality reached over a greater area near the western bank of Himmerfjärd. The municipality of Mörkö had been included in Hölö municipality since 1952. Hölö's probably most important industry was Edeby marble quarry which didn't only export its green-grey marble to Stockholm but also to other European countries. The corporation was established in 1922 and shut down in 1978.

== Community ==
Hölö is near Vagnhärad and Södertälje, south of Stockholm. Village services include a food store, pizzeria, cycle store, kayak rental and a post office or "kiosk". Nearby there are some renowned restaurants including Oaxens Skärgårskrog, Skansholmens Sjökrog and Tullgarns Värdshus at Tullgarns castle. Other than that, Hölö has an elementary school with athletic grounds and community library. The Scout Corps of Hölö is a part of the Swedish Scout federation SSF (Svenska Scoutförbundet) and Södertörns Scoutdistrikt. It was founded in the beginning of the 1960s. If you live in Hölö you usually live in a villa, or in the new apartments that were built to cope with the population growth.

== Communication ==
Hölö train station was closed in the 1950s and today doesn't have a train station. The nearest being Järna. Regular local "SL" buses connect the village with Järna.

== Notable residents ==
- Alice Habsburg, aristocrat and member of the Polish Home Army, was born in Hölö.

== Gallery ==
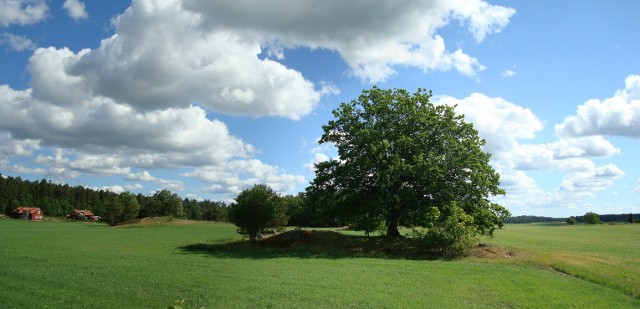
Hölö countryside

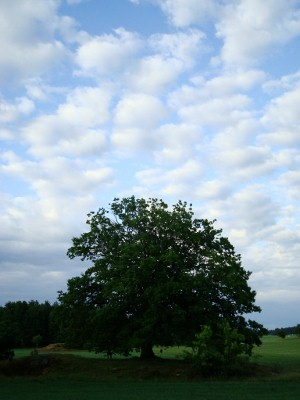
Tree & Cloud motive in Hölö

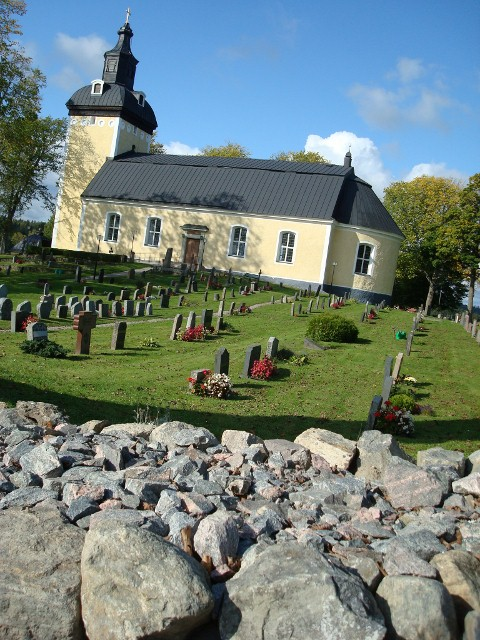
Hölö Church & Cemetery

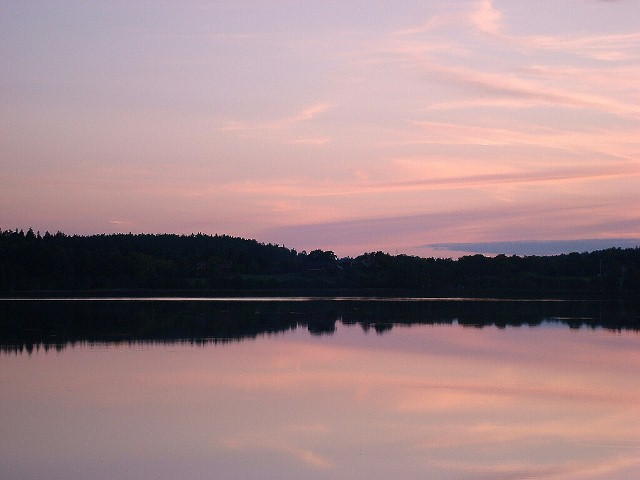
Lake by Hölö Church
