= Ankarcrona =

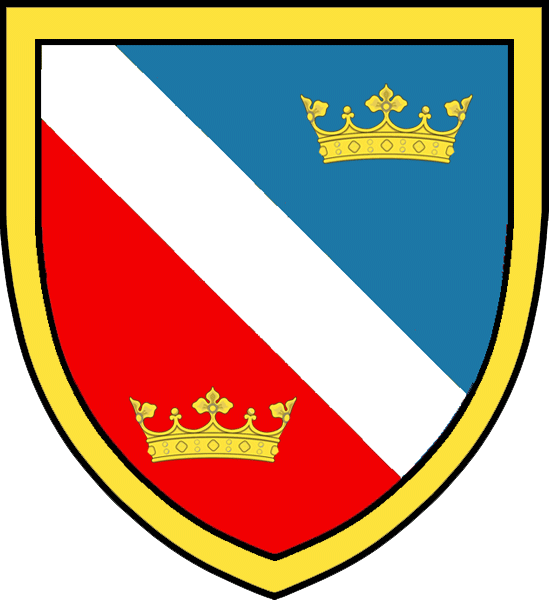
- Origin: Ronneby, Sweden
- Estate: Runsa (sv:Runsa slott)

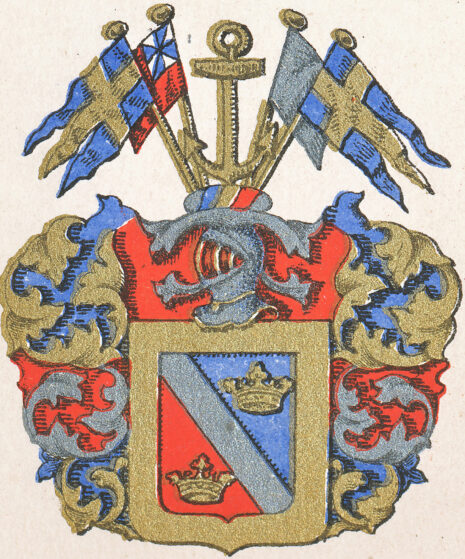
Coat of Arms of the Ankarcrona family

The Ankarcrona family is a Swedish noble family of German origin, which settled in Sweden in the 17th century.

== History ==
The family originated from Christoffer Jakobsson, a German Protestant convert who immigrated from Bohemia to Sweden in the 17th century, and resided in Ronneby in Sweden. Two of his grandsons were ennobled, but these branches ceased to exist in 1719 and 1750.

The now living branch stems from his third grandson, the assessor Jakob Christoffer in Karlskrona. He was ennobled in 1751.

== Members in selection ==
- Theodor Ankarcrona (1687–1750), Admiral, scientist
- Jakob Christoffer Ankarkrona, ennobled in 1751.
- Theodor Vilhelm Ankarcrona, father to Edvard Alexander and Henrik August
- Edvard Alexander (Alexis) Ankarcrona (1825–1901) artist and military officer, elder brother of Henrik August
- Henrik August Ankarcrona (1831–1917), military officer and painter.
- Sten Johan Theodor Claes Ankarcrona (1861–1936) marine officer
- Gustaf Ankarcrona (1869–1933), artist and scientist
- Sten Sture Gustaf Ankarcrona, colonel
- Alice Elisabeth Ankarcrona (1899-1985), morganatic wife of Archduke Karl Albrecht of Austria
