= Adlercreutz (comital family) =

The Swedish comital family Adlercreutz is a part of the baronial family Adlercreutz. The general of the Swedish cavalry, cabinet minister and adjutant general Carl Johan Adlercreutz (1757-1815), who had been created a Swedish baron 30 August 1808, was created Swedish count in accordance with the 37th paragraph of the Swedish instrument of government of 1809, meaning only the head of the family possesses the title, 31 August 1814 in Uddevalla by King Charles XIII of Sweden, and was introduced at the Swedish house of the nobility 10 March 1814 as comital family number 125.

The present count is Carl Fredrik Magnus Adlercreutz, born 25 October 1944, who inherited the title from his father, count Gustaf Fredrik Adlercreutz, at his death in 1973. His son Magnus Gustaf Victor Adlercreutz is the present baron Adlercreutz.

== Adlercreutz no 125 ==
- Carl Adlercreutz (1698–1750), Swedish field secretary
  - Tomas Adlercreutz (1733–1796), Swedish officer
    - Carl Johan Adlercreutz (1757–1815), Swedish officer
      - Fredrik Tomas Adlercreutz (1793–1852), Swedish officer and diplomat in Colombia
        - Nikolas Adlercreutz (1832–1909), Swedish officer and landowner
          - Nils Adlercreutz (1866–1955), Swedish officer and horse rider
            - Gregor Adlercreutz (1898–1944), Swedish dressage rider
        - Carlos Adlercreutz (1828–1903), Swedish chamberlain
          - Carl Adlercreutz (1853–1904), Swedish count and officer
            - Carlos Adlercreutz (1890–1963), Swedish officer
              - Thomas Adlercreutz (born 1944), Swedish jurist
              - Gustaf Adlercreutz (born 1946)
    - Gustaf Magnus Adlercreutz (1775–1845) Swedish lieutenant general
      - Axel Adlercreutz (1821–1880), Swedish politician and government official
        - Carl Adlercreutz (1866–1937), Swedish doctor
          - Axel Adlercreutz (1917–2013), Swedish professor of law
        - Magnus Adlercreutz (1868–1923), Swedish officer
        - Patrick Adlercreutz (1871–1955), Swedish diplomat

== Adlercreutz no 1386 ==
- Tomas (né Teuterström) Adlercreutz (1643–1710) Swedish nursar
  - Erik Adlercreutz (1694–1741) Swedish hovrättsråd
    - Henrik Tomas Adlercreutz (1732–1801), Swedish assessor
      - Carl Henrik Adlercreutz (1772–1832), Finnish lawspeaker
        - Herman Leonard Magnus Knut Adlercreutz (1825–1890), Finnish vice circuit judge
          - Herman Adlercreutz (1862–1921), Finnish vice circuit judge
            - Erik Adlercreutz (1899–1989), Finnish doctor
              - Herman Adlercreutz (1932–2014), Finnish doctor

== Others ==
- Eric Adlercreutz (born 1935), Finnish architect, married to the architect Gunnel Adlercreutz née af Björkesten (born 1941)
- Maria Adlercreutz (1936–2014), artist
