= Oscar Carl Gustav Ankarcrona =

Huntsman-Major of the Court of the King of Sweden

Oscar Carl Gustav Ankarcrona (born 10 June 1857), was a Huntsman-Major of the Court of the King of Sweden, Major of the Swedish Army, etc., son of Conrad Victor Ankarcrona (1823–1912), Grand Master of the Court of the King of Sweden, etc., and wife and cousin (m. 1851) Ebba Charlotta, Grevinna Bielke (1828–1911).

== Family and children ==
He married on 20 November 1886 Anna Elisabeth Aurora Carleson, born on 5 November 1867, daughter of Edvard Henrik Carleson (1820–1912), Councilor of Justice, Councilor of State of the Kingdom of Sweden, etc., and wife (m. 1863) Marie Louise Aurore Arfwedson (b. 18 August 1846), and had issue, at least two daughters:

- Alice Habsburg (Tullgarn, nr. Trosa, 18 December 1889 - Saltsjöbaden, nr. Stockholm, 26 November 1985), created Prinzessin von Altenburg with the style of Highness on 15 December 1949, married morganatically at the Castle of Saysbusch (Żywiec), Galicia, on 8 November 1920 to Archduke Karl Albrecht of Austria, and had issue
- Victoria (Vera) Ankarcrona, married to August af Petersens, and had issue
