= Edvard Carleson =

Swedish politician (1820–1884)

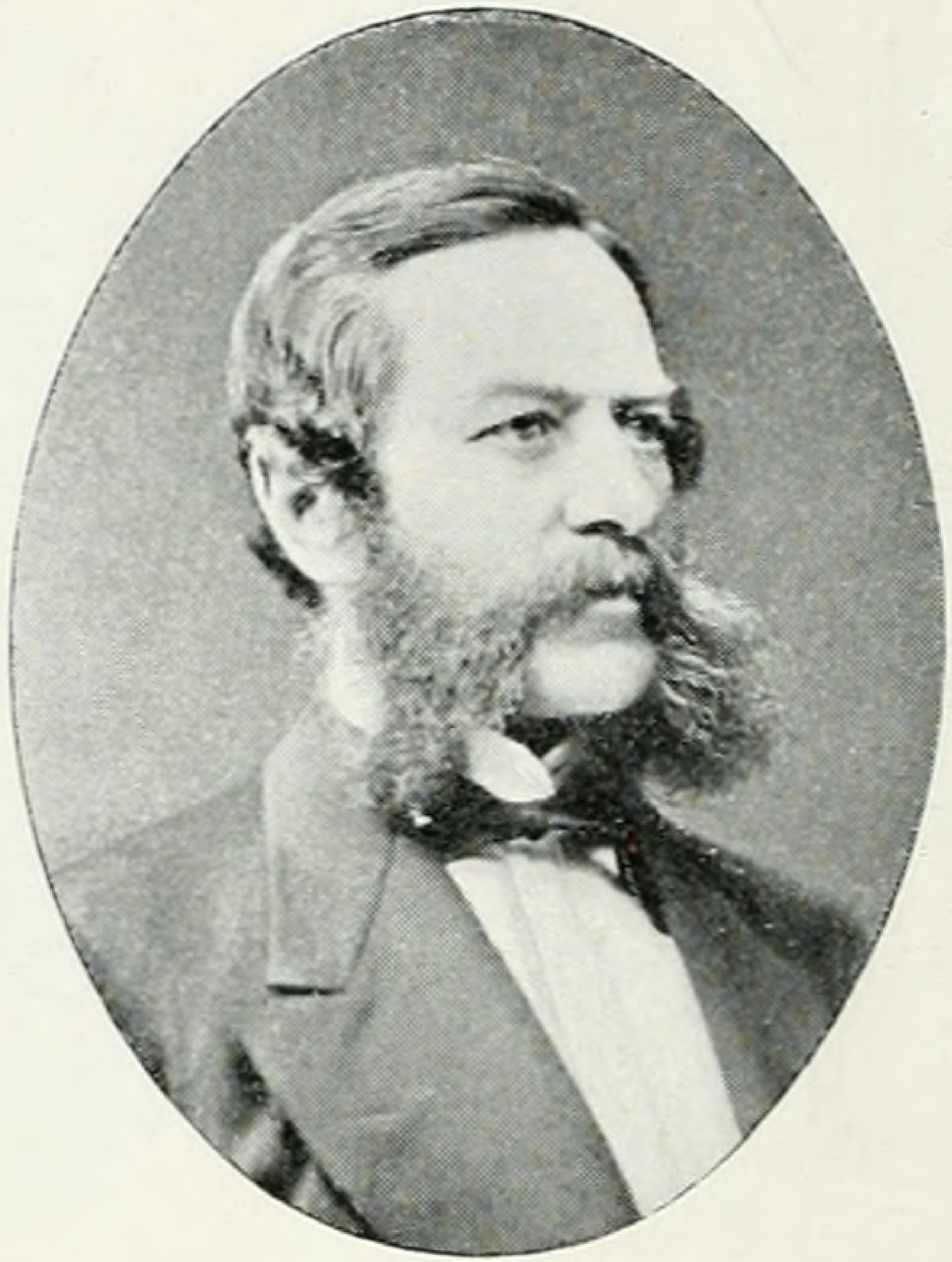

Prime Minister for Justice
- In office 1874–1875
- Preceded by: Axel Gustav Adlercreutz
- Succeeded by: Louis Gerhard De Geer

Personal details
- Born: 16 November 1820; Valstad, Sweden
- Died: 1 April 1884 (aged 63); Stockholm, Sweden
- Spouse: Marie Louise Aurora Arfwedson

Edvard Henrik Carleson (16 November 1820 – 1 April 1884) was a Councilor of Justice and a Councilor of State of the Kingdom of Sweden. He was the son of Jacob Edvard Carleson, Lieutenant Colonel of the Swedish Army, and wife Liboria Fredrika Eleonora Harmens.

== Family and children ==
He married in 1863 Marie Louise Aurore Arfwedson (18 August 1846 -). They had at least one daughter, Anna Elisabeth Aurore Carleson (5 November 1867 -), married on 20 November 1886 to Oscar Carl Gustav Ankarcrona (10 June 1857 -), Huntsman-Major of the Court of the King of Sweden, Major of the Swedish Army, etc., and had issue.

Preceded by Axel Gustav Adlercreutz	Prime Minister for Justice; 1874–1875	Succeeded by Louis Gerhard De Geer
