= Valstad =

Valstad is a Norwegian surname. Notable people with the surname include:

- Bjørnar Valstad (born 1967), Norwegian orienteer
- Otto Valstad (1862–1950), Norwegian painter, illustrator and writer
- Tilla Valstad (1871–1957), Norwegian writer and journalist
