= Axel Gustav Adlercreutz =

Swedish politician (1821–1880)

Axel Gustaf Adlercreutz
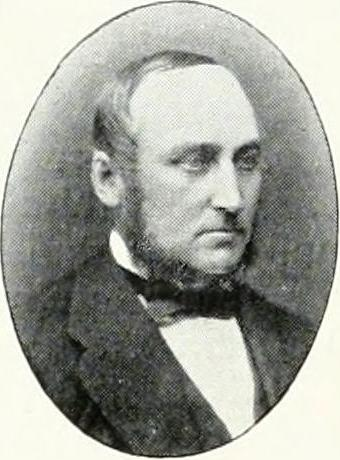

Prime Minister for Justice
- In office 1870–1874
- Preceded by: Louis Gerhard De Geer
- Succeeded by: Edvard Carleson

Personal details
- Born: 2 March 1821 Skara, Sweden
- Died: 20 May 1880 (aged 59) Stockholm, Sweden
- Spouse: Countess Hedvig Levenhaupt

Axel Gustaf Adlercreutz (2 March 1821 – 20 May 1880) was a Swedish politician, civil servant, President of the Göta Court of Appeal, Minister in the Cabinet, Member of Parliament 1847–1866 and 1877–1880, Prime Minister for Justice 1870–1874.

In 1853 he married Baroness Hedvig Lewenhaupt, with whom he had ten children.

== Life ==
Axel Adlercreutz was born in Skara in present-day Västra Götaland County, the son of Lieutenant General Gustaf Magnus Adlercreutz and Margareta Elisabeth Charlotta von Arbin. He received a Bachelor of Laws degree at Uppsala 1845 and then made a typical and successful career in the civil service: clerk at the Legal, Financial and Administrative Services Agency and at the Bureau for Justice Affairs (Justitierevisionen), then a notary at the Svea Court of Appeal, Deputy District Judge (vice häradshövding) 1848, Public Prosecutor (fiskal) 1850, Assessor 1853 and Justice of the Supreme Court of Sweden 1860, finally becoming President of Göta Court of Appeal 1868. Adlercreutz barely had time to take up his office before King Charles XV appointed him Minister for Civil Service Affairs in the Cabinet of Louis De Geer, despite the fact that Adlercreutz had opposed the abolition of the Parliament of the Estates, a minor revolution that had been the work of De Geer. One explanation for the King's choice was a desire to placate a Parliament that had adopted a cool attitude toward the Government after the Representation Reform Act of 1865–1866. The Second Chamber was dominated by fiscally conservative farmers who adopted cuts in the Government's budget proposal, backed up by the First Chamber where resentment toward the Representation Reform still lingered.

When the criticism did not abate, De Geer also lost the support of the King and resigned. As the strongest figure in the Privy Council, Adlercreutz now became Prime Minister for Justice. The King now intervened more openly with Government affairs, which undermined the position of the Privy Council. Charles announced in his Throne Speech that he intended to summon an extraordinary Parliament to solve the issue of defense policy. Not even all members of the Council had been notified in advance. When, at this extraordinary Parliament, the Government lost the vote on defense policy, all members of the Privy Council requested to be relieved of their office. While the King attempted to compose a new government, Minister of Foreign Affairs Carl Wachtmeister suffered a stroke in the street and fell dead to the ground. Except a frail health, he had been upset and worried during the crisis of government. 23 days after the resignation applications, the Posttidningen declared that since efforts to form a new Privy Council had failed to achieve their intended objective, the current members of the Privy Council had offered to remain in their offices, upon the King's request. Thus Adlercreutz oversaw the change on the throne after Charles XV, who died in 1872 after some time of disease at the age of 46, to the King's brother, Oscar II.

In 1873, the issue of defense policy was solved by a compromise engineered by De Geer in his capacity as Chairman of the Parliament Defense Committee. Nevertheless, conflict arose the following year over a question concerning the organization of the Army, over which Adlercreutz to some surprise demanded a vote of confidence and lost.

Upon his resignation he was appointed Governor of Malmöhus County. In that district, he was returned to the bicameral Parliament of 1877, after having been absent since the abolition of the Parliament of the Estates, wherein he had belonged to the Estate of the Nobility. After his resignation he became an outspoken critic of the policy of the De Geer Cabinet; among other issues he opposed the abolition of the duty of conveyance which the major part of farmers owed the King. He tabled motions on legislation against lotteries.

Adlercreutz was of a hot-tempered and courageous nature. He never hesitated to give as good as he got on the floor of Parliament. Count Henning Hamilton, used to being treated with great deference, was nonplussed when Adlercreutz rebuked him for his gibes. When De Geer lamented the coarse tone of the debate, Adlercreutz replied that it was only the final powerless twitches of the defeated. With his undaunted spirit and naïveté, he also passed quite unscathed through Parliament despite all attempts to bring him down. He was small and brave as a weasel, Carl Wadenstierna, his colleague in Parliament, said of him.

Adlercreutz died on 20 May 1880 in Stockholm at the age of 59.

Preceded by Louis Gerhard De Geer	Prime Minister for Justice; 1870–1874	Succeeded by Edvard Carleson
