= Badeni =

Polish noble family

Bończa coat of arms of the Badeni family

The Badeni family is a Polish and Austrian noble family. The dynasty became important in the 19th century in partitioned Poland as one of the wealthiest and most influential families in Galicia.

== History ==
The dynasty originated from the bourgeoisie of Lwów (Lemberg), and was ennobled in the 18th century. Family members held important posts in the Polish–Lithuanian Commonwealth, as well as in the Kingdom of Galicia and Lodomeria, the Duchy of Warsaw, and Congress Poland.

On 8 November 1845 Kazimierz Badeni (d. 1854), a landowner in the Lemberg area, was elevated to comital rank (Graf) by Emperor Ferdinand I of Austria; his son Władysław (1819–1888) became a member of the Galician Diet and a deputy to the Austrian Imperial Council. Władysław's son Kasimir Felix (Kazimierz Feliks; 1846–1909) served as Galician governor from 1888 to 1895 and as Minister-President of Austria from 1895 to 1897. The Counts of Badeni were hereditary peers of the Austrian House of Lords until 1918.

== Notable members ==
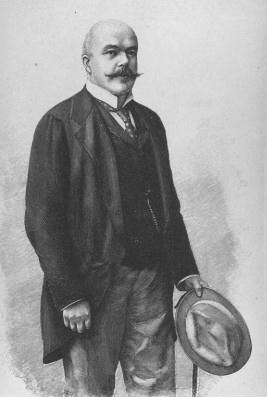
Count Kasimir Felix Badeni

- Count Kasimir Felix Badeni (1846–1909), Minister-President of the Cisleithanian half of Austria-Hungary
- Stanisław Marcin Badeni (1850–1912), Marshal of the Sejm

== Coat of arms ==
The family used the Bończa coat of arms.

Coat of arms of Counts Badeni

Counts Badeni arms in 1887

== Palaces ==
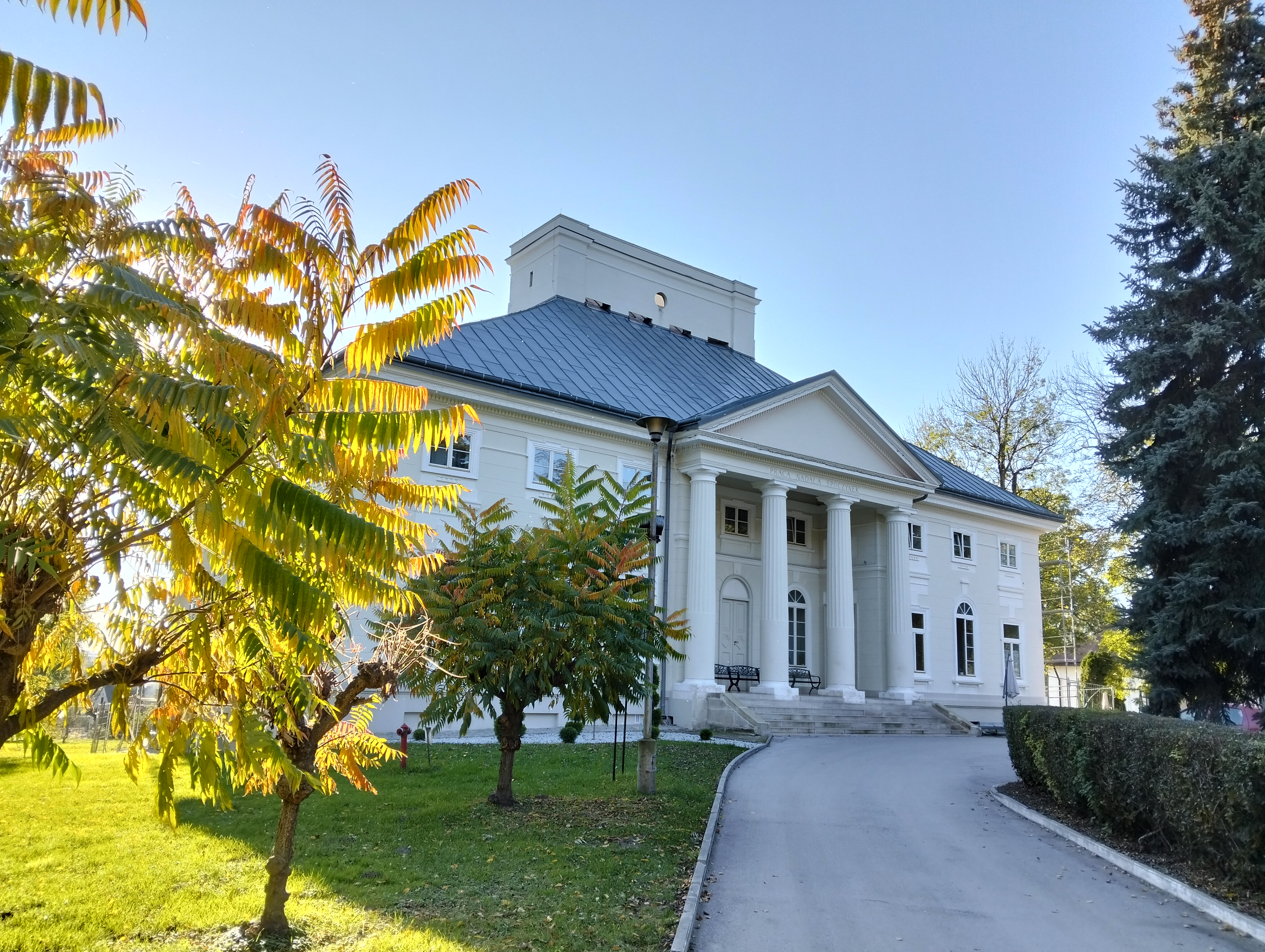
Palace in Bejsce

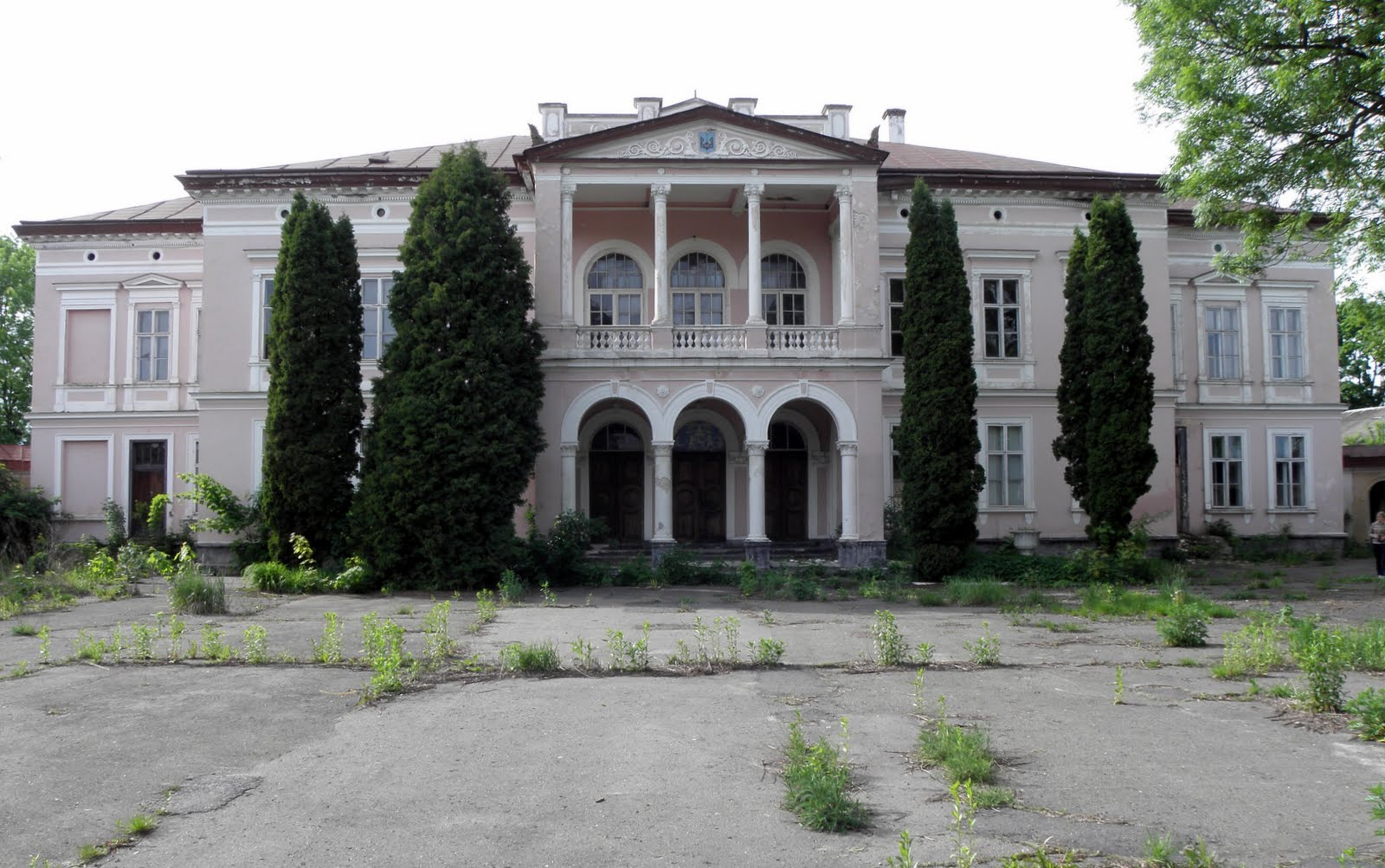
Badeni Palace in Busk

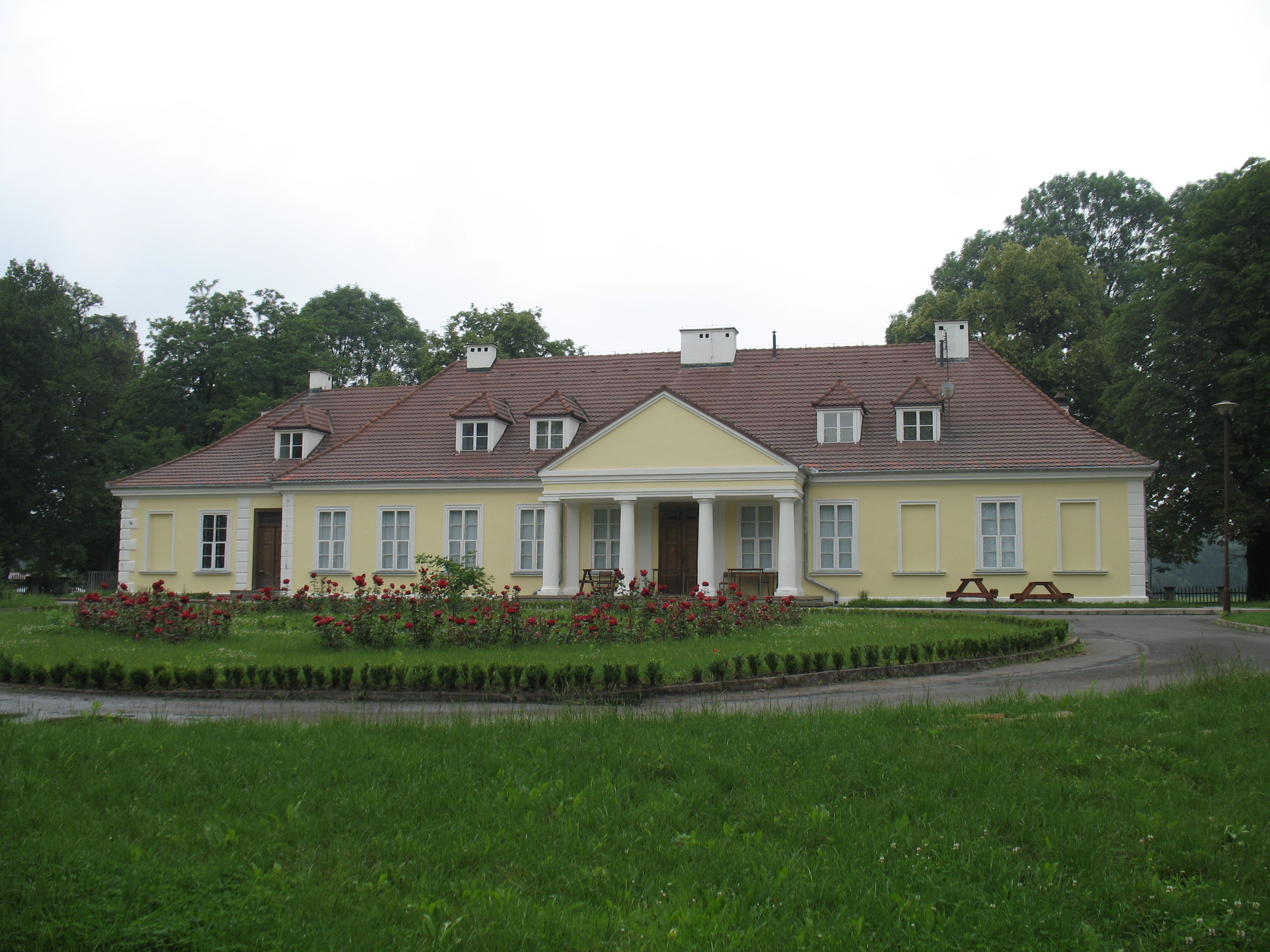
Badeni manor house in Branice (Kraków)

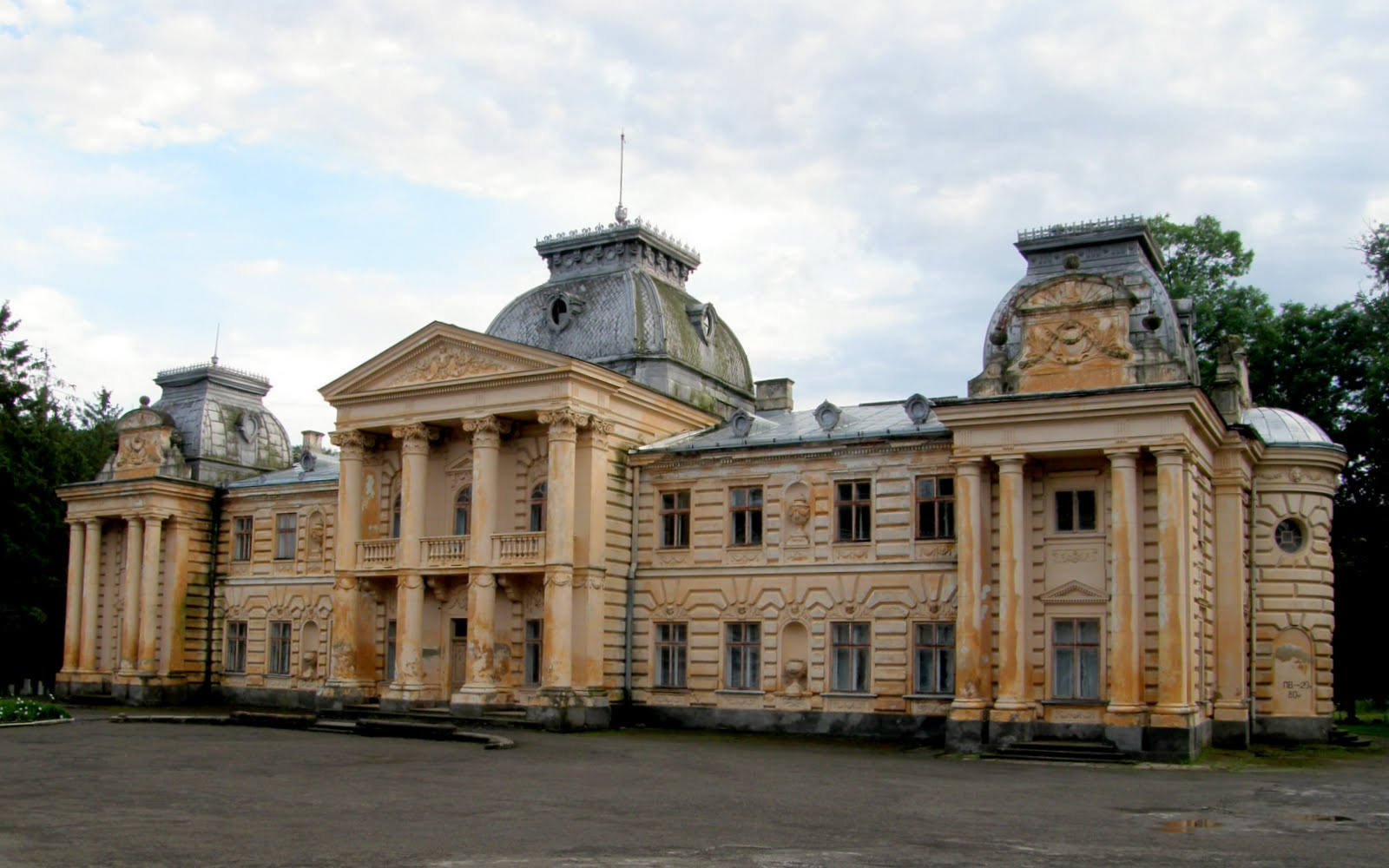
Koropets Palace

== Genealogical tree ==
Jan Kanty Badyni, died ?
|→ Sebastian Badeni, died 1779
    |→ Stanisław, died 1824
    |   |→ Ignacy, died 1859
    |   |   |→ Seweryn, died ?
    |   |        |→ Jan, died 1899
    |   |→ Kazimierz, died 1854
    |   |   |→ Władysław, died 1888
    |   |   |   |→ Kazimierz, died 1906
    |   |   |   |   |→ Ludwik, died 1916
    |   |   |   |       |→ Kazimierz (Joachim), died 2010
    |   |   |   |→ Stanisław, died 1912
    |   |   |       |→ Stanisław, died 1943
    |   |   |       |→ Henryk, died 1943
    |   |   |       |→ Stefan, died 1961
    |   |   |           |→ Jan, died 1995
    |   |   |               |→ Michał
    |   |   |                   |→ Alexander
    |   |   |→ Aleksander, died 1869
    |   |→ Michał, died 1863
    |       |→ Stanisław, died 1910
    |       |   |→ Józef, died 1932
    |       |   |→ Marcin, died 1930
    |       |       |→ Stanisław, died 1987
    |       |→ Józef, died 1878
    |→ Marcin, died 1828
        |→ Sebastian, died 1872

== Bibliography ==
- J. Borkowski, Genealogie żyjących utytułowanych rodów polskich, Lwów 1895, s. 130-135 (Online version).
