= Council of State (Sweden) =

Special government cabinet meeting (e. 1975)

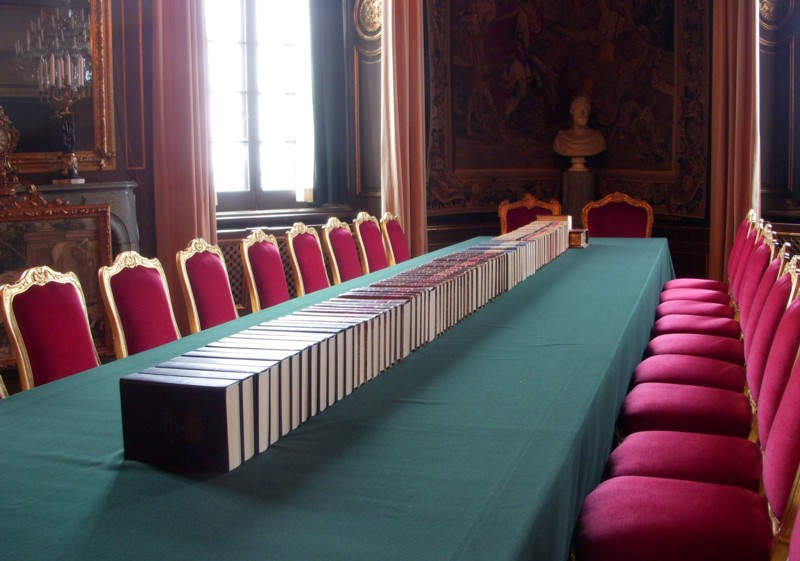
The Council Room (Konseljsalen) at Stockholm Palace in 2011.

The post-1975 Swedish Council of State (Swedish: Konselj) is a special cabinet meeting chaired by the Swedish Monarch which is held a few times each year so that the government can, as required by the constitution, keep the king informed on matters of state.

== History ==
Under the 1809 Instrument of Government the pre-1975 Council of State exercised executive authority and usually met once a week. At these meetings government bills were granted royal assent and formally became decisions of the Royal Majesty.

However in 1975 with the introduction of the 1974 Instrument of Government the monarch's role became strictly ceremonial and royal assent was no longer required for bills to become law. Executive power was instead transferred to the new Government of Sweden which is chaired and led in all important aspects by the Prime Minister of Sweden. The Council of State remained a meeting chaired by the king but holding no special powers they were continued so that the monarch can be informed on matters of state and government policy.

== Types of Councils of State ==
- Information Councils are held, usually 3-4 times a year, to semi-regularly inform the king on manners of state. Formally it is the monarch that summons the Council for this purpose but the decision is made in consultation with the Prime Minister.
- Change of Government Councils are always held when the Riksdag has elected a new Prime Minister. It is held as soon as the Prime Minister elect has announced which ministers shall be part of their cabinet and it is during this council that the monarch confirms that a change of government has taken place. The Speaker of the Riksdag is always called to these meetings to inform the monarch of the government formation process, and replace them as chair should they be unable to attend.
- Councils of State are also held following births of new members of the Swedish Royal Family. At these the monarch announces the newborn's name and title to the government.

== The Council Room ==
The Council Room at Stockholm Palace has been used by the Council since around 1870. Some of the original furniture remains, for example the wooden double doors. During the reign of Gustav III it was used as a dining room. The room obtained its current appearance during the reign of Charles XV.
