= Peterson House =

Peterson House may refer to:

- J. B. Doughterty and C. W. Peterson House, Phoenix, Arizona, listed on the National Register of Historic Places (NRHP) in Phoenix
- Peterson House (Albany, California), listed on the NRHP in Alameda County
- Peterson House (Lakewood, Colorado), NRHP-listed
- Peterson and Mustard's Hermitage Farm, Smyrna, Delaware, NRHP-listed
- Peterson-Wilbanks House, Vidalia, Georgia, NRHP-listed
- Lake-Peterson House, Rockford, Illinois, NRHP-listed
- Max Peterson House, Davenport, Iowa, NRHP-listed
- Brugjeld-Peterson Family Farmstead District, Wallingford, Iowa, NRHP-listed
- Peterson-Dumesnil House, Louisville, Kentucky, NRHP-listed
- Smith-Peterson House, Newton, Massachusetts, NRHP-listed
- Andrew Peterson Farmstead, Waconia, Minnesota, NRHP-listed
- Peterson House (Bozeman, Montana), listed on the NRHP in Montana
- Peter Peterson Farmstead, Waverly, Nebraska, NRHP-listed
- Streeter-Peterson House, Aurora, Nebraska, NRHP-listed
- John N. Peterson Farm, Poplar, North Carolina, NRHP-listed in Mitchell County
- J. H. Peterson Machine Shop, Portland, Oregon, listed on the NRHP in Oregon
- Carol Peterson House, Pittsburgh, Pennsylvania
- William G. Milne House, also known as Peterson House, in Dell Rapids, South Dakota, NRHP-listed
- Mathias Peterson Homestead, Mission Hill, South Dakota, listed on the NRHP in South Dakota
- Peterson-Loriks House, Oldham, South Dakota, listed on the NRHP in South Dakota
- George A. Peterson House, Austin, Texas, listed on the NRHP in Texas
- Canute Peterson House, Ephraim, Utah, NRHP-listed
- Peterson–Burr House, Salina, Utah, listed on the NRHP in Utah
- Mickelson, Hyrum and Mary A. Terry Peterson, House, Sandy, Utah, listed on the NRHP in Utah
- Charles Peterson House, Sandy, Utah, listed on the NRHP in Utah
- Peter Peterson House, Ephraim, Wisconsin, listed on the NRHP in Wisconsin
- Seth Peterson Cottage, Lake Delton, Wisconsin, NRHP-listed

== See also ==
- Petersen House (disambiguation)
- Peterson Farm (disambiguation)
