= Peterson =

Peterson may refer to:

== People and fictional characters ==
- Peterson (surname), including lists of people and fictional characters

== Places ==
=== United States ===
- Peterson, Indiana
- Peterson, Iowa
- Peterson, Minnesota
- Peterson, Utah

=== Canada ===
- Peterson, Saskatchewan

== Other uses ==
- Peterson (company), a Norwegian industrial company
- Peterson Field Guides
- Peterson Pipes
- Peterson (album), a 2025 album by Tory Lanez
- USS Peterson, two US Navy ships of that name
- Peterson Air Force Base, Colorado

== See also ==
- Peterson's algorithm, computer science
- Pedersen
- Pederson (disambiguation)
- Petersen
- Peterson Farm (disambiguation)
- Peterson House (disambiguation)
- Pietersen
- Pieterson
