= Petersen House (disambiguation) =

The Petersen House is a U.S. National Historic Site in Washington, D.C.

Petersen House may also refer to:

- Petersen House (Sweden), Gamla stan

in the United States

(by state, then city)

- Niels Petersen House, Tempe, Arizona, listed on the National Register of Historic Places (NRHP)
- Lambrite-Iles-Petersen, Davenport, Iowa, a U.S. Historic district contributing property
- Max Petersen House, Davenport, Iowa, NRHP-listed
- Thuesen-Petersen House, Scipio, Utah, NRHP-listed
- H. S. Petersen House, Port Townsend, Washington, listed on the NRHP in Jefferson County, Washington

== See also ==
- Peterson House (disambiguation)
