= Peterson Farm =

Peterson Farm or Peterson Farmstead may refer to:

- Brugjeld–Peterson Family Farmstead District, Wallingford, Iowa, listed on the NRHP in Iowa
- Andrew Peterson Farmstead, Waconia, Minnesota
- Peter Peterson Farmstead, Waverly, Nebraska, listed on the NRHP in Nebraska
- John N. Peterson Farm, Poplar, North Carolina

== See also ==
- Peterson House (disambiguation)
