= Pitters =

Pitters is a surname. Notable people with the surname include:

- Alfonso Pitters (born 1963), Panamanian sprinter
- Shakan Pitters (born 1989), British boxer

== See also ==
- Pieters
