= Dr. Kuno Struck House =

Historic house in Iowa, United States

- U.S. National Register of Historic Places
- U.S. Historic district – Contributing property
- Davenport Register of Historic Properties
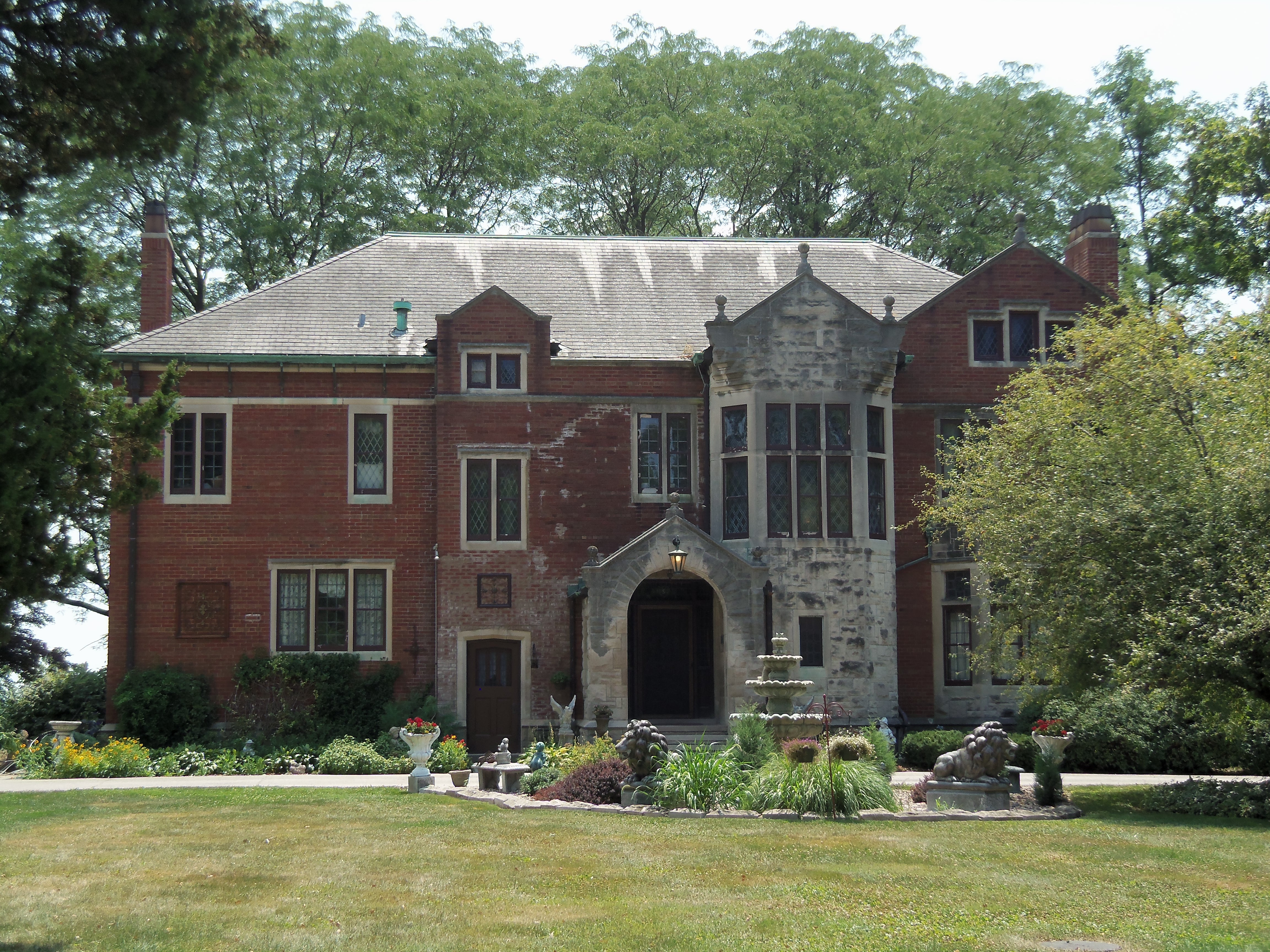

- Location within Iowa Location within the United States
- Location: 1645 W. 12th St. Davenport, Iowa
- Coordinates: 41°31′50″N 90°36′1″W
- Area: 2 acres (0.81 ha)
- Built: 1911
- Architect: Clausen & Kruse
- Architectural style: Jacobean Revival
- Part of: Marycrest College Historic District (ID04000341)
- MPS: Davenport MRA
- NRHP reference No.: 84001567
- DRHP No.: 18

Significant dates
- Added to NRHP: July 27, 1984
- Designated DRHP: August 7, 1996

The Dr. Kuno Struck House, also known as Clifton Manor, is a historic building located in the West End of Davenport, Iowa, United States. It was individually listed on the National Register of Historic Places in 1984, and on the Davenport Register of Historic Properties in 1996. The house, along with its garage, became a part of the Marycrest College campus and they were both listed as contributing properties in the Marycrest College Historic District in 2004.

== Dr. Kuno Struck ==
Kuno Struck was born in Davenport in 1883 to Henry C. and Johanna (Wessel) Struck. He graduated from the local schools and received a medical degree from the State University of Iowa. He specialized in bacteriology and pathology. He started a practice in Davenport after a year with his cousin in Moline, Illinois, Dr. Arp. Dr. Struck married Norma Petersen, the daughter of Max D. Petersen who was one of the owners of the J.H.C. Petersen's Sons' Store. However, Struck stopped practicing medicine shortly after the United States entered WWI in 1917. He served as a vice president at Davenport Bank and Trust and on the boards of a variety of local organizations. Struck had interests in painting, playing the violin, ornithology, and wild flowers.

== History ==
The house was designed by the Davenport architectural firm of Clausen & Kruse in the Jacobean Revival style after Dr Struck saw in England a first century English Tudor mansion and had this home built as a replica. It is the only house built in this architectural style in the city. The house was completed in 1911 and called Clifton Manor. Norma's family home Clifton Hill was on the property next door. Dr. Struck lived here until his death in 1947. Norma, and their only child Dorothy and her husband, continued to live in the house. Dorothy was married at least twice, to William Mundy and James H. Bell. A gardener and chauffeur were also a part of the household. Lavish parties were held in the house in the 1950s and the 1960s. Norma died in 1973.

The family sold the house before it became a part of Marycrest College in 1978 and served the college as a community center. It also housed a variety of offices for the school in subsequent years. In 1984 area designers transformed the house for a Decorators' Show House fundraiser for the Quad City Symphony Orchestra. After the college closed the rest of the campus was converted into Marycrest Senior Living, but the Struck House has remained separate from that development. It was sold to Marlene and Donald Talbot in 2005 and to Randy and Mary McDonald in 2018.

== Architecture ==
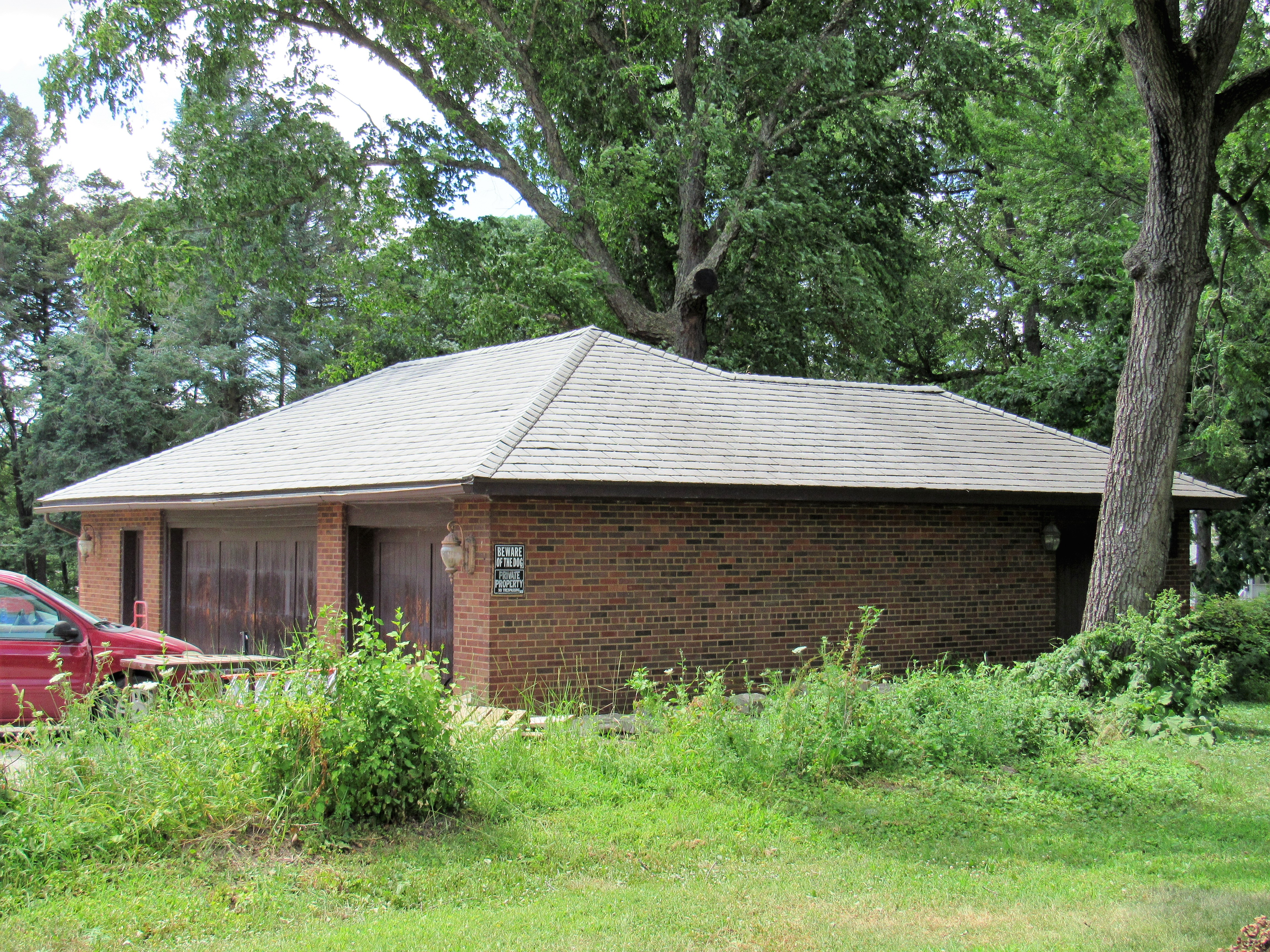
Garage

The house is 2½-stories and follows a rectangular plan. The main façades are on the long sides of the structure, and it is capped with a hipped roof. The north façade is asymmetrical while the south façade follows a symmetrical plan with gabled end pavilions that flank a semi-circular terrace. The exterior is covered in a pink-red brick and a rock-faced stone that is smoothly dressed. The interior features a grand central staircase in the foyer, a large living room with a stone fireplace, a dining room with a honeycombed ceiling, and a solarium with curved walls and arched, colored glass windows. The walls are covered with patterned cloth wallpaper. Leaded glass windows with some colored glass are located throughout the house. Kuno Struck considered it pretentious to display one of his paintings in his home, but the owners who began a restoration project in 2019 displayed a reproduction of one of his paintings in the living room.

The house is situated on a large lot with a circular drive that connects it to West Twelfth Street. The single-story garage sits to the northeast of the house. It is composed of brick and features both double and single car bays of the south side of the structure.
