= Erstavik =

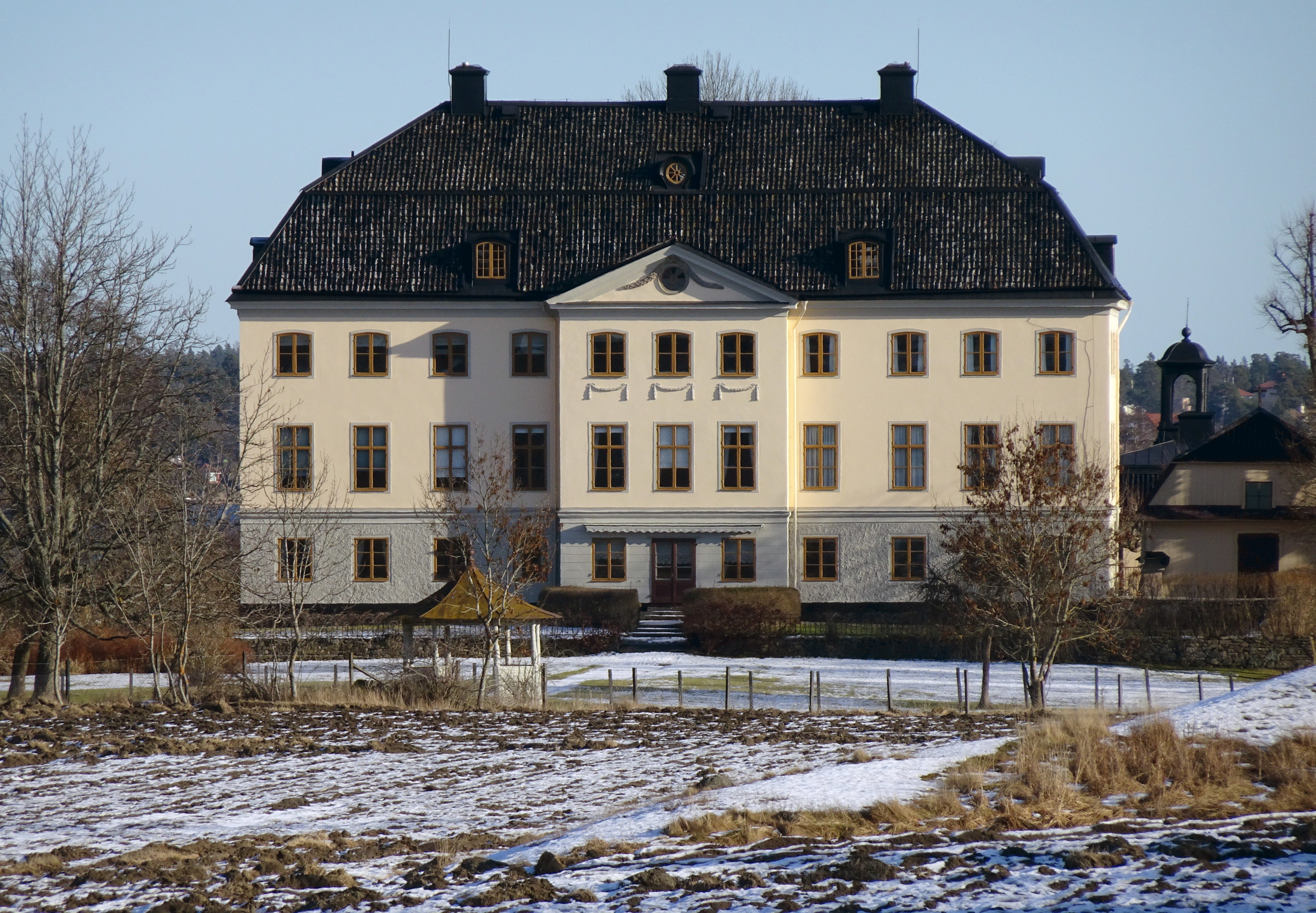
- Interactive map of the Erstavik area

General information
- Location: Nacka Municipality, Sweden
- Completed: 1765

Design and construction
- Architect: Jean Eric Rehn

Website
- Erstavik.se

Erstavik is a manor house in Nacka Municipality, Sweden. Located south of Stockholm, at an inlet of the Baltic Sea.

The surrounding property is one of the few remaining in Sweden still held as fideicommissum. It is located next to the Nackareservatet nature reserve. The property was acquired by Herman Petersen in the 1700s.

== See also ==
- List of castles in Sweden
- Petersen House
