= Herman Petersen =

Swedish merchant (1713–1765)

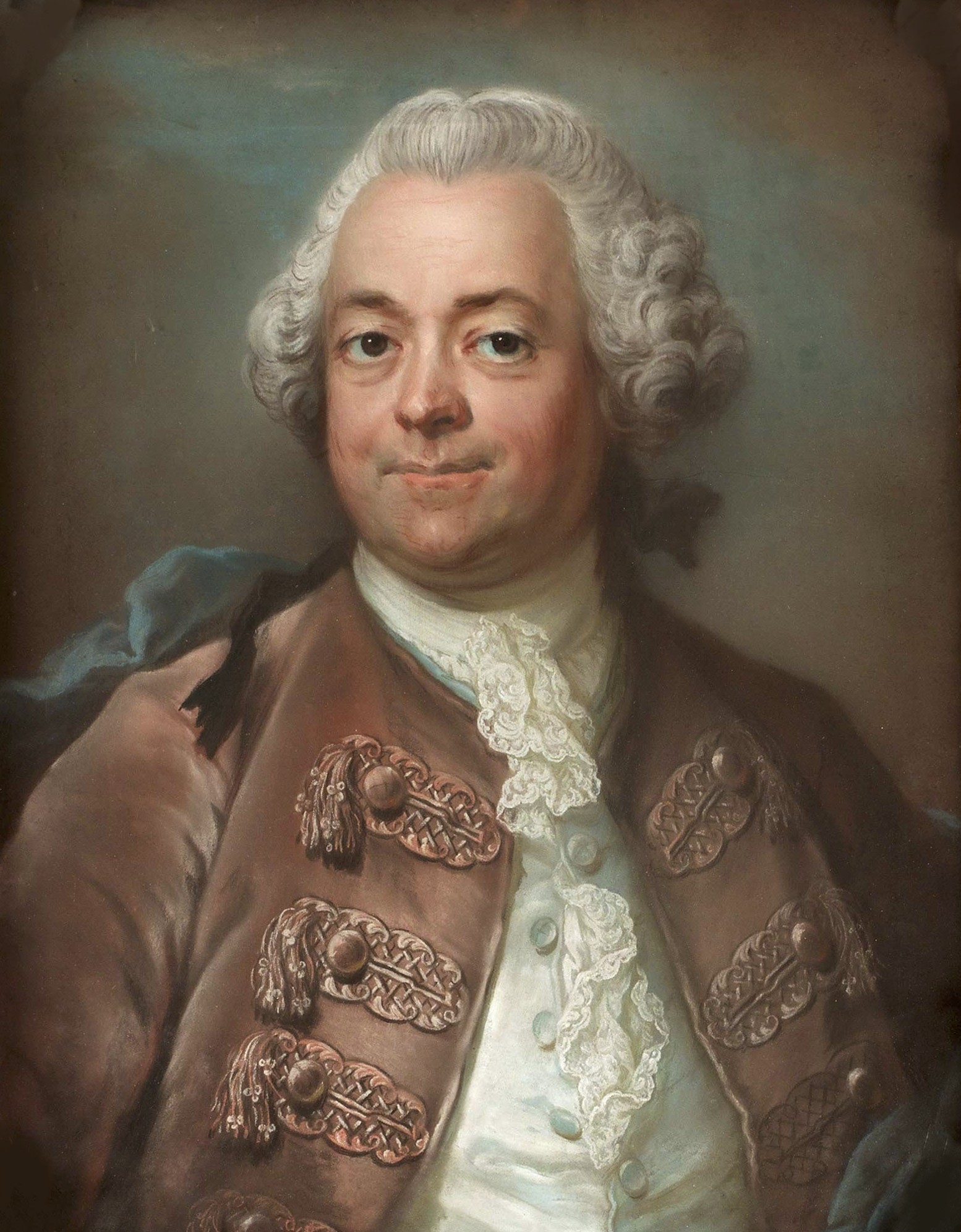
- Portrait by Gustaf Lundberg
- Born: 29 December 1713; Gothenburg, Sweden
- Died: 13 August 1765 (aged 51); Stockholm, Sweden
- Occupation: Merchant
- Parent(s): Abraham Petersen; Christina Tham

Herman Petersen (13 December 1713 – 13 August 1765) was a Swedish merchant and director of the Swedish East India Company, amassed significant wealth through copper trade with France. He was part of the 'Skeppsbroadel' and owned several notable properties, including Erstavik and the Petersen House in Stockholm.

== Early life ==
Herman Petersen was born on December 13, 1713, to Abraham Petersen, a wholesaler in Gothenburg, and his wife Christina Tham, a member of the Tham family. His grandfather had migrated from Stettin, Prussia, to Stockholm, and subsequently, his father relocated to Gothenburg.

== Business career ==
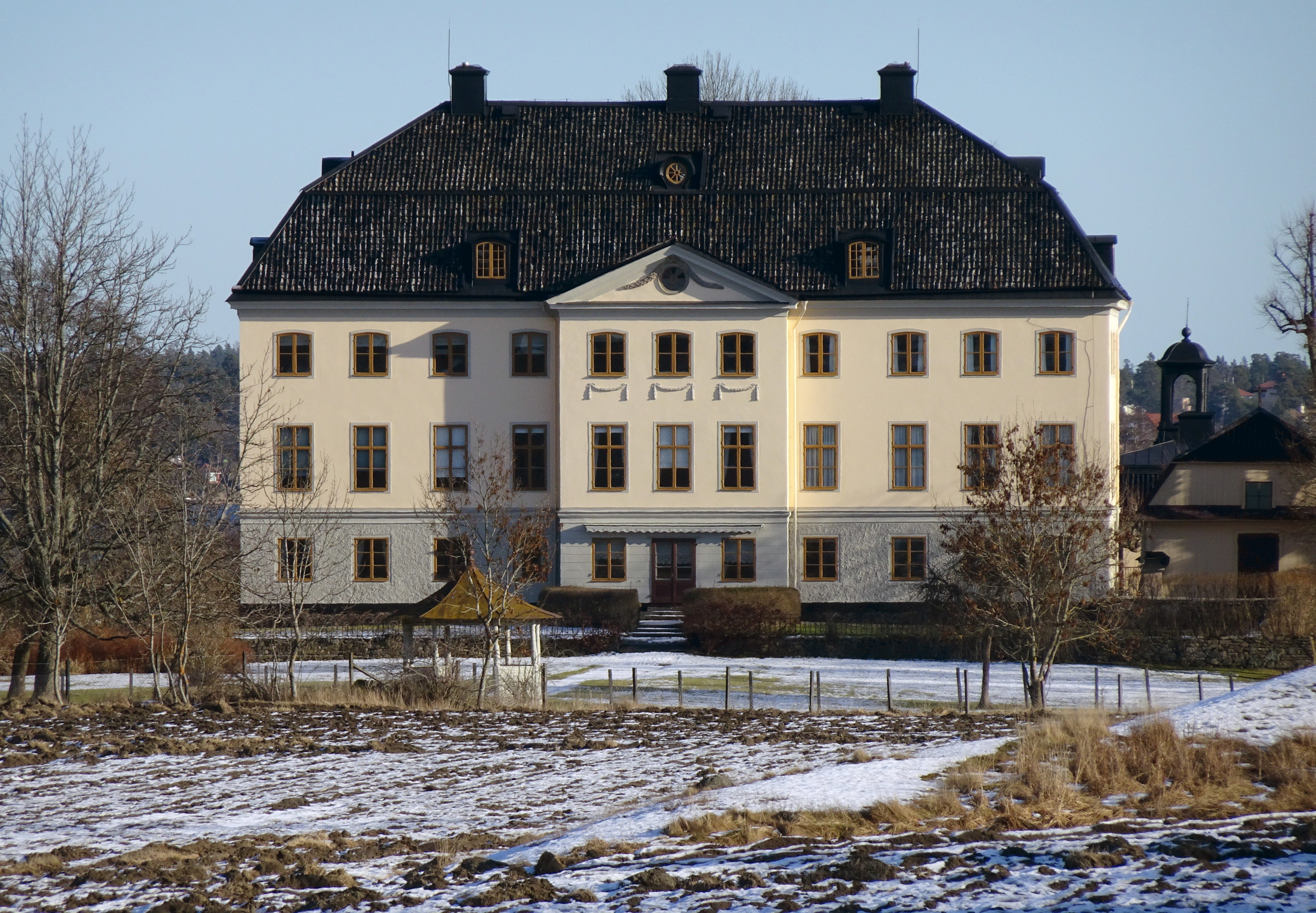
Erstavik estate, 2016

Petersen was elected to serve as director of the Swedish East India Company for a period during the 18th century.

Additionally, Petersen traded great amounts of copper with France. He did so with his company Petersen & Bedoire, that he had started with his brother-in-law, Fredrik Bedoire. Petersen was a member of the so-called 'Skeppsbroadel'. (Note: "Skeppsbroadeln," from Skeppsbron, describes wealthy merchants in 17th to 19th-century Stockholm, originally for socially ambitious ones with significant wealth.)

Petersen possessed Erstavik, a castle-like structure located in Nacka, as well as the Petersen House, built in the Dutch Baroque architectural style, in Gamla stan. In 1746, Petersen acquired Stora Nyckelviken by Saltsjön, where he built a summer residence. The property is now located in Nacka Municipality and is a nature reserve.

After his death, the properties were established as a fideicommissum.

== Family ==
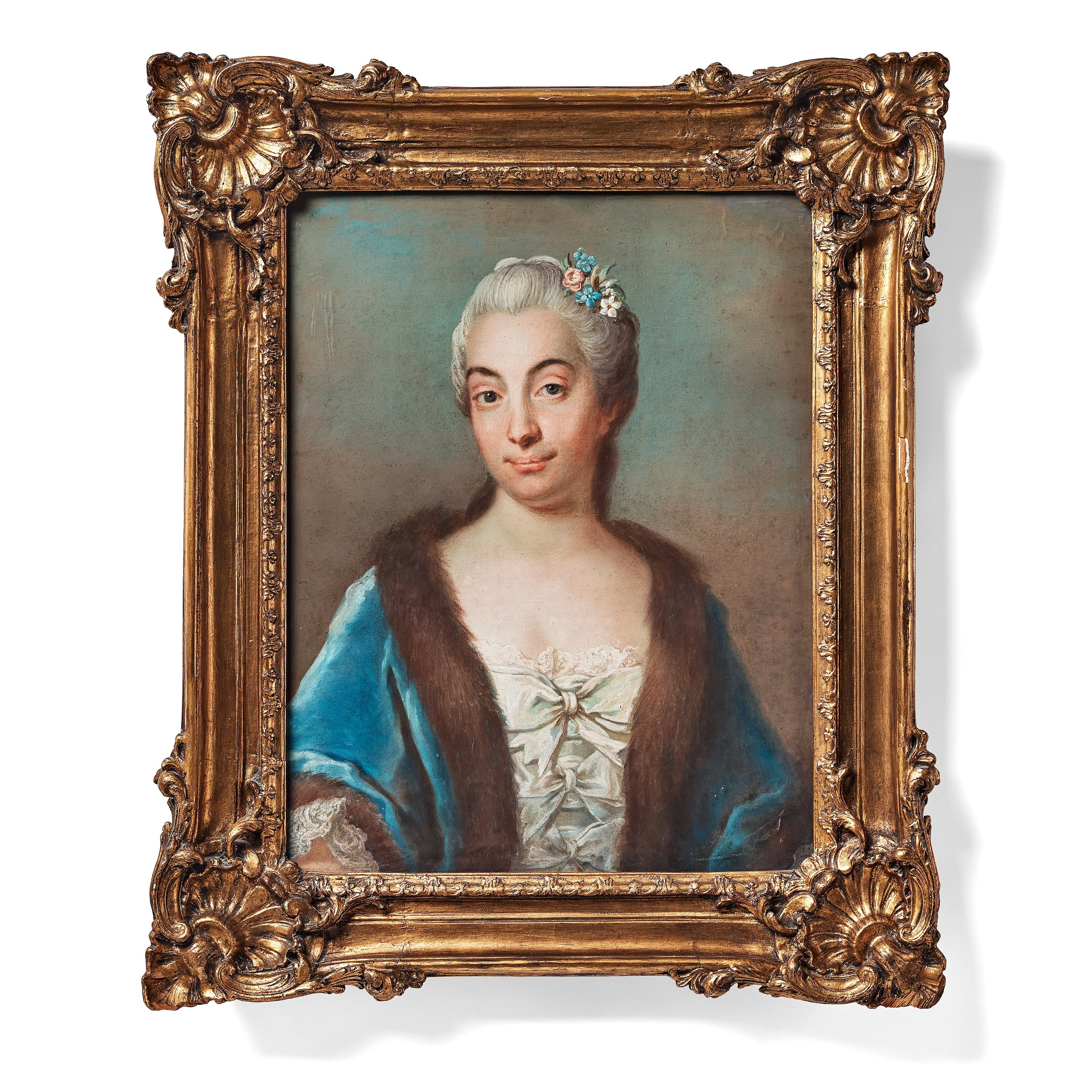
Charlotta Bedoire (1725 – 1808)

In the year 1741, he entered into matrimony with Magdalena Bedoire, and in 1753, he espoused her cousin, Charlotta Bedoire. Both were members of the Bedoire family, tracing their ancestry to the French Huguenots. The familial unions resulted in the birth of five offspring. A nobiliary particle, denoted as "af," was appended to their familial surname. Herman Magnus af Petersens was his 2nd great-grandson.

The af Petersens family gained official recognition within the Swedish House of Nobility in Stockholm, assigned the number 2071. Additionally, this noble lineage was acknowledged in Helsinki in 1810, bearing the identifier of number 166.

The final resting place of Petersen, is situated at the Maria Magdalena Church on Södermalm.

== Sources ==
- Anrep, Gabriel (1862). Svenska adelns ättar-taflor utgifna (in Swedish). Vol. 3. Norstedt.
- Bedoire, Fredric; Lange, Ulrich; Josephson, Mikael (2022), Wiiburg Setterblad, Marianne (ed.), Köpmansfurstens arv : Erstavik, Petersenska huset, herrgårdslandskapet och rekreation för en växande storstad (in Swedish), Hemera bokförlag, ISBN 97-891-987-6240-2
- Jonsson, Marita (2002). På Bellmans tid (in Swedish). A. Bonnier. ISBN 978-91-0-057609-7.
- Lindahl, Carl Fredrik (1900). Svenska millionärer (in Swedish). Vol. 5. P.A. Huldbergs bokförlags-aktielbolag – via Project Runeberg.
- Nilzén, Göran (1995–1997). "Herman Petersen". Svenskt biografiskt lexikon (in Swedish). Vol. 29. National Archives of Sweden. p. 109.
- Nyberg, Klas (2003). "Skeppsbroadeln blev rik på ofriheten". www.svensktidskrift.se.
- Snitt, Ingalill; Jonsson, Marita (2007). Swedish!: Light, Shape, Landscape. Albert Bonniers Förlag. ISBN 978-91-0-011441-1.
- Wallenberg, Jacob; Afzelius, Nils (1929). Samlade skrifter (in Swedish). Bonniers – via Google Books.
- Wasastjerna, Oskar (1880). Ättar-taflor öfver den på Finlands riddarhus introducerade adeln (in Swedish). Söderströms tryckeri. p. 181.
- Wasling, Jesper (2021). Waslings heraldiska ordbok (in Swedish). Books on Demand. ISBN 978-91-8007-016-4.
- Wåhlin, Karl; Rinman, Sven (1896). Ord och bild (in Swedish). P.A. Norstedt & Söner – via Google Books.
