= Thompson Island =

Thompson Island may refer to:

- Thompson Island (Antarctica)
- Thompson Island (Massachusetts), or Cathleen Stone Island, an island in Boston Harbor, U.S.
- Thompson Island (Nunavut), Canada
- Thompson Island (South Atlantic), a phantom island
