= Wasastjerna =

- Language: Swedish

Origin
- Derivation: Wasa + stjerna

Wasastjerna is a Swedish-language surname. As of 2 February 2026, Wasastjerna is the surname of 61 Finnish citizens. Notable people with the surname include:

- Jarl Axel Wasastjerna (1896–1972), Finnish physicist
- Knut Wasastjerna (1867–1935), Finnish architect who co-founded Grahn, Hedman & Wasastjerna
- Oskar Wasastjerna (1819–1889), Finnish soldier, civil servant, genealogist, historian and writer
- Torsten Wasastjerna (1863–1924), Finnish painter
