= Petersen (disambiguation) =

Petersen is a common Danish patronymic surname.

Petersen may also refer to:

== Buildings and structures ==
- Petersen Automotive Museum, an automotive museum in Los Angeles, California, U.S.
- Petersen Building, a building in Los Angeles, California, U.S.
- Petersen Events Center, a basketball arena at the University of Pittsburgh, Pennsylvania, U.S.
- Petersen House, a historic house in Washington, D.C., U.S.
- Petersen House (Sweden), a house in Stockholm, Sweden
- Petersen Rock Garden, a rock garden and museum in Redmond, Oregon, U.S.
- Petersen Sports Complex, a facility at the University of Pittsburgh, Pennsylvania, U.S.

== Geography ==
- Petersen Bank, a submerged bank in the Southern Ocean
- Petersen Glacier, a glacier in Wyoming, U.S.
- Petersen Island, an island in Antarctica
- Petersen Mountain, a mountain range in Nevada, U.S.
- Petersen Peak, a rock peak in Antarctica

== Science and mathematics ==
- Petersen family, a family of seven undirected graphs
- Petersen graph, a symmetric cubic graph with 10 vertices and 15 edges
- Petersen matrix, a mathematical model of systems of biochemical reactions

== Arts and entertainment ==
- Petersen (film), a 1974 Australian film
- Petersen Quartet, a German string quartet

== Other uses ==
- Petersen and Fritz dragster, a motor vehicle
- Petersen Tegl, a Danish brick manufacturer
