= Pieterson =

Pieterson is a surname. Notable people with the surname include:

- George Pieterson (1942–2016), Dutch clarinetist
- Hector Pieterson (1964–1976), subject of an iconic image of the 1976 Soweto uprising in South Africa

== See also ==
- Hector Pieterson Museum, in Orlando West, Soweto
- Pietersen (disambiguation)
- Peterson (disambiguation)
- Petersen (disambiguation)
