= Pieterse =

Pieterse is a Dutch and Afrikaans patronymic surname. The surname was first used in the Netherlands before the colonial era. After the Dutch established a colony in the Cape of Good Hope, people with the surname Pieterse moved to the colony and as a consequence, Pieterse became a common Afrikaans surname.

Notable people with the surname include:

- Barend Pieterse (born 1979), South African rugby union player
- Cosmo Pieterse (born 1930), South African playwright, actor, poet, literary critic and anthologist
- Dylan Pieterse (born 1995), South African rugby player
- Erasmus Pieterse (born 1992), South African field hockey player
- Ernie Pieterse (1938–2017), South African racing driver
- Happy Pieterse (1942–2013), South African boxer
- Jan Pieterse (born 1942), Dutch cyclist
- Jan Nederveen Pieterse (born 1946), Dutch sociologist
- Liberius Pieterse (1905–1973), Dutch Roman Catholic priest in Pakistan
- Reyaad Pieterse (born 1992), South African footballer
- Sasha Pieterse (born 1996), South African actress and singer
- Marissa Pieterse (born 1989), South African actuary
- Puck Pieterse (born 2002) Dutch cyclist

Fictional

- Woutertje Pieterse, protagonist of the novel of the same name by Multatuli
- Woutertje Pieterse Prijs, Dutch literary award named after this character

== See also ==
- Pieters
- Pietersen
