= Pietersen =

Origin
- Origin: patronymic
- Meaning: son of Peter
- Region of origin: Netherlands

Other names
- Variant forms: Pieters, Pieterse, Pieterson, Petersen, Peterson

Pietersen is a Dutch and Afrikaans patronymic surname meaning "son of Peter". There are other spellings. Pietersen is a rare given name. People with the surname Pietersen include:

- Abigail Pietersen (born 1984), South African figure skater, older sister of Justin Pietersen
- Charl Pietersen (born 1983), South African cricketer
- Charl Pietersen (born 1991), South African darts player
- Jessica Pietersen (born 1980), English singer, television personality, and dancer
- Joe Pietersen (born 1984), South African rugby player
- JP Pietersen (born 1986), South African rugby player
- Judith Pietersen (born 1989), Dutch volleyball player
- Justin Pietersen (born 1986), South African figure skater, younger brother of Abigail Pietersen
- Kevin Pietersen (born 1980), South Africa-born English cricketer
- Magdalene Louisa Pietersen (born 1956), South African politician
- Roscoe Pietersen (born 1989), South African football player
- Willem Essuman Pietersen (c.1844–1914), Gold Coast merchant, politician, and educationist
- William G. Pietersen (born 1937), South African businessman and author
