= Bedoirsgränd =

Alley in Gamla stan, Stockholm, Sweden

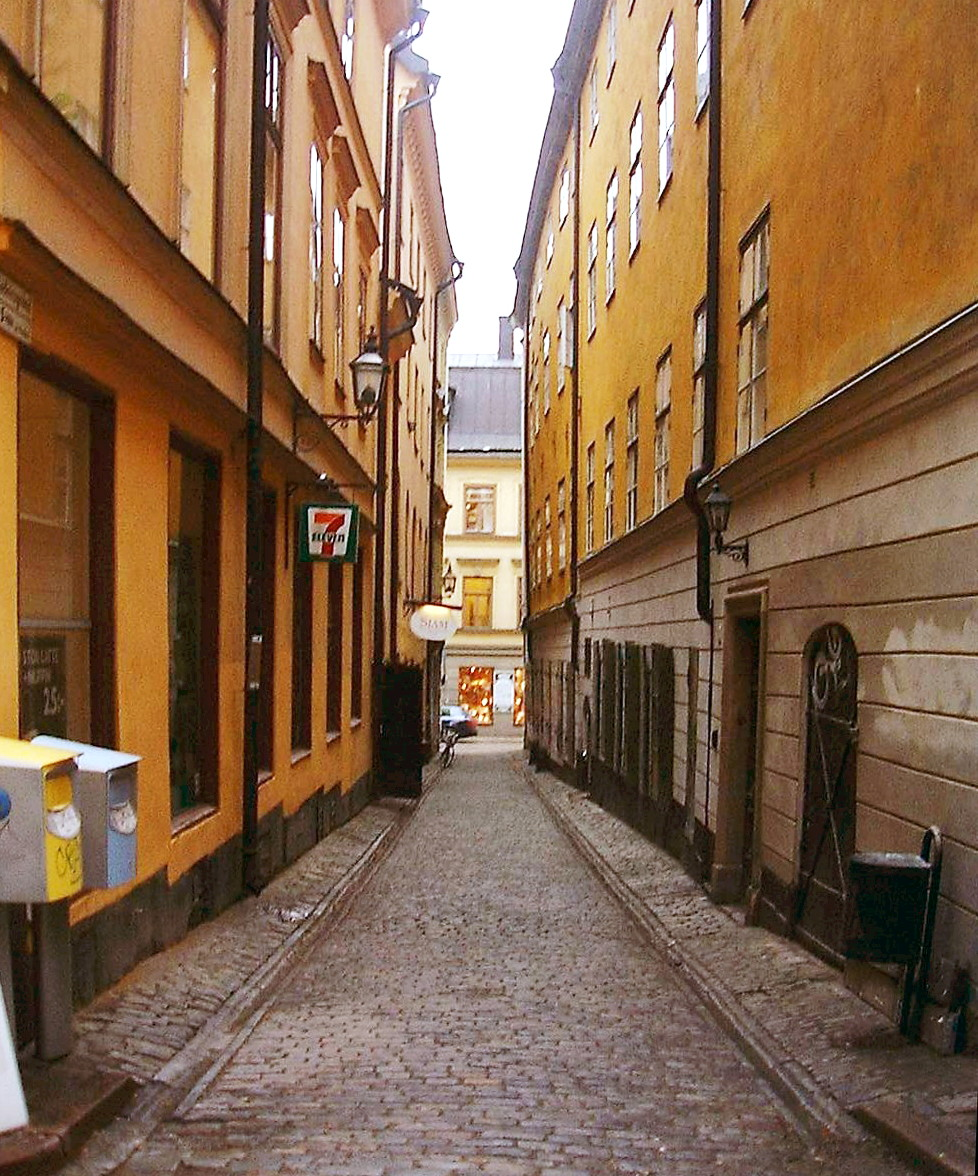
- Bedoirsgränd in March 2007
- Interactive map of Bedoirsgränd
- Namesake: Jean Bedoire the Younger
- Location: Gamla stan, Stockholm, Sweden
- Coordinates: 59°19′28.0″N 18°04′09.9″E
- West end: Västerlånggatan
- East end: Stora Nygatan

Bedoirsgränd is an alley in Gamla stan, the old town of Stockholm, Sweden. Stretching from Västerlånggatan to Stora Nygatan, it forms a parallel street to Kåkbrinken and Skräddargränd.

== History ==
The alley is named after the merchant Jean Bedoire the Younger (1683–1753) who for some time ruled the Swedish salt market and became the proprietor of the narrow block Parcas north of the alley in 1707 when he married Maria Juliana Paradis, the widow of wine trader Conrad Cuyper who had used the block as a wine storage. Jean Bedoire successfully developed the business of his father and namesake by exporting iron and salt and as a banker, including kings such as Charles XII and Frederick I among his customers. He died in 1753, leaving a fortune of 5,700,000 copper riksdaler behind. (See also 7, Stortorget.) The shutters on the building date from this era, as does the unassuming Rococo portal of Number 2.

The name first appears on a map dated 1733. The alley is mentioned in 1581 as Lille Brynhilz grändh ("Smaller Alley of Bryniel").

== See also ==
- Bedoire family
- List of streets and squares in Gamla stan
