= Bedoire family =

Swedish family of French ancestry

Bedoire Bédoire
- Swedish family
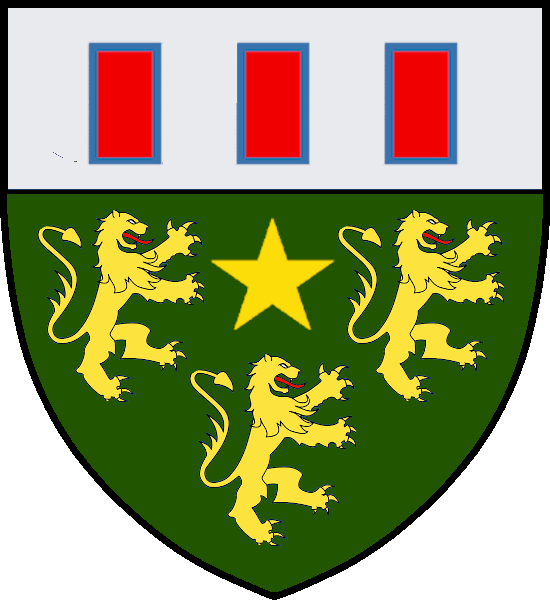
- De Bedoire coat of arms
- Country: Sweden
- Origin: Saintonge, France
- Founded: 17th century
- Traditions: Reformed (Calvinist) tradition

The Bedoire family (French: [bɛdwaʁ]) is a Swedish family of French Huguenot ancestry. Known for its economic activities between the 17th and 19th centuries, the family accumulated significant wealth, with some members establishing themselves as influential figures in Stockholm's commerce and trade.

== Overview ==
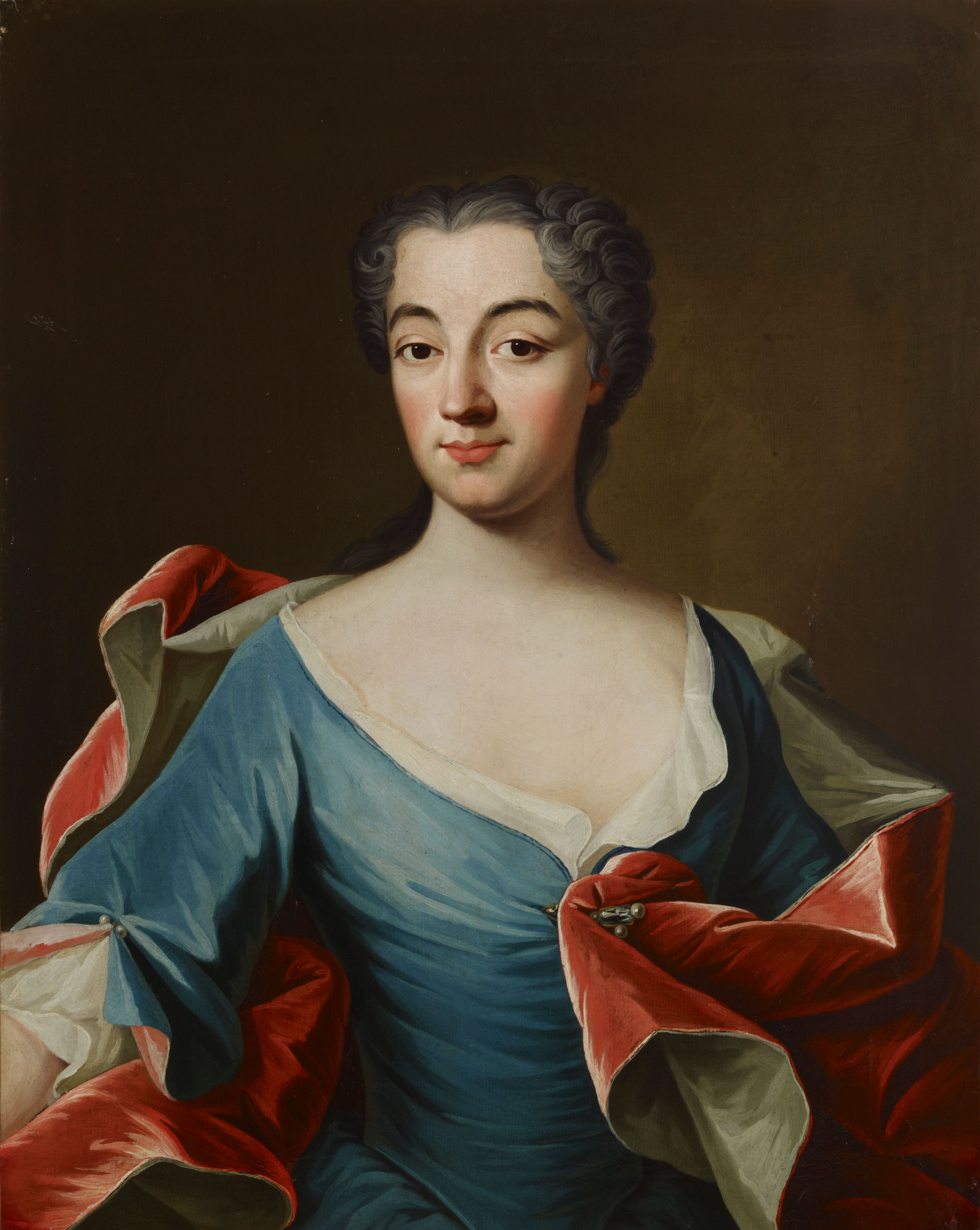
Maria Juliana Bedoire

The Bedoire family, also spelled Bédoire, traces its origins to the historical province of Saintonge. The first known member, Jean Bedoire (d. 1721), emigrated to Sweden, arriving in Stockholm in 1665 after fleeing religious persecution. He later married Maria (Marique) Carré (1661–1712).

François "Frans" Bedoire (1690–1743), a director of the Swedish East India Company, and Jean Bedoire the Younger were both involved in economic ventures through which they amassed significant wealth. Frans Bedoire married Maria Elisabeth Ross (1703–1738), a member of a Scottish noble family.

The family was considered one of several prominent and influential families within Stockholm's bourgeoisie, with members residing in Gamla Stan.

== Connections ==
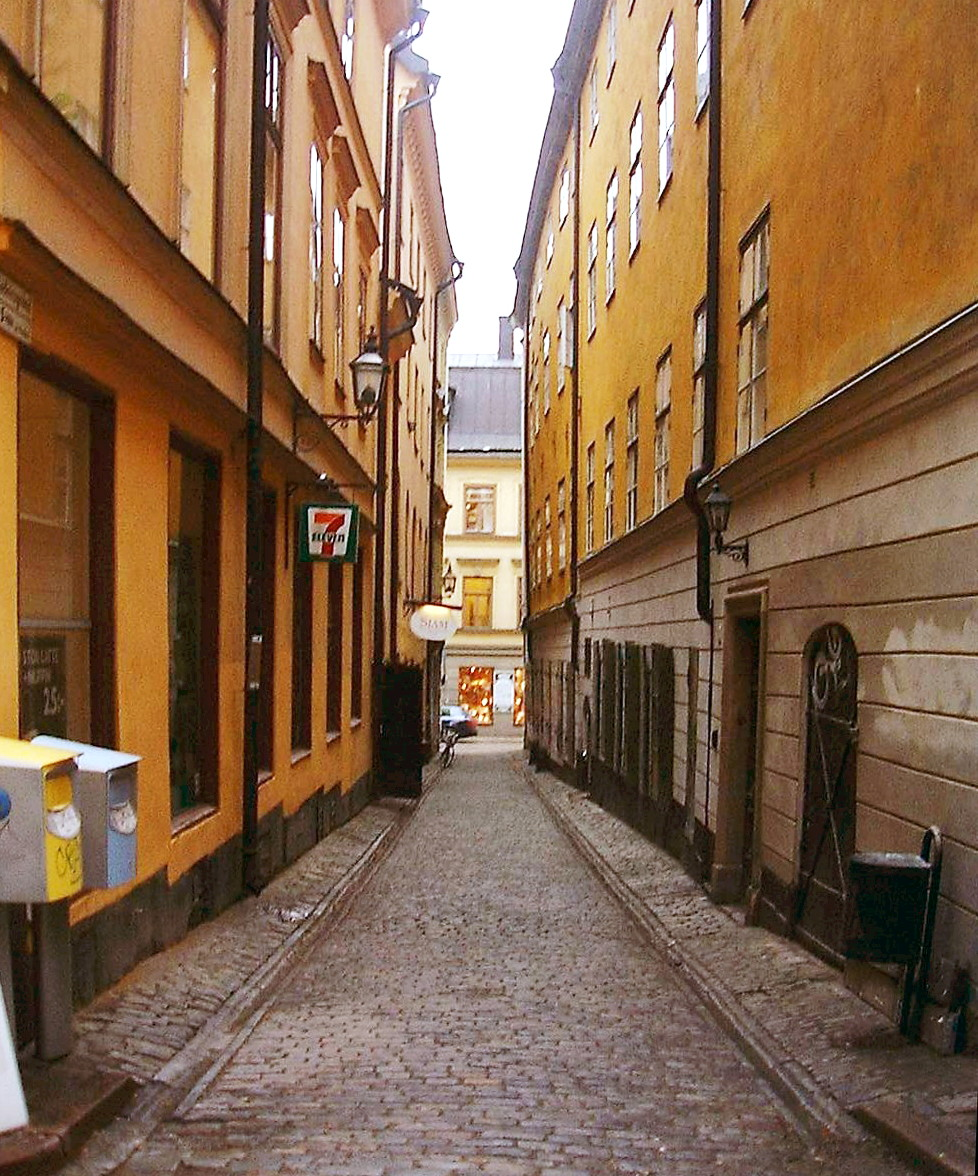
Bedoirsgränd, in Gamla Stan, Stockholm, was named after Jean Bedoire the Younger

The Bedoire family maintained connections with several prominent Stockholm families of economic influence through both marriage and financial partnerships. These included the Gother, Toutin, Lefebure, Pauli, Campbell, Montgomery, Jennings and Finlay families.

Several women of the Bedoire family married merchants and business figures, in addition to maintaining purely economic ties with others. This included two cousins, Magdalena (d. 1751) and Charlotta Bedoire (1725–1808), who both married Herman Petersen, also a director of the Swedish East India Company. A business partnership was also established between the families as a trading company, known as Petersen & Bedoire. It was through the latter purchases was made on behalf of both the East India Company and the Navy.

In addition to their connections within the purely economic strata of society, members of the Bedoire family also married into other circles of society. In 1845, Augusta Bedoire (1820–1906) married the renowned physicist Anders Ångström. She was the daughter of Jean Henric Bedoire and Catharina Henrietta Littorin.

== De Bedoire branch ==
One member of the Bedoire family was ennobled, Jean de Bedoire, Sweden's envoy to Portugal, while the others remained members of the bourgeoisie. De Bedoire traveled extensively, was regarded by the late Gustav III, and remained a prominent figure within the Bedoire family circle.

The De Bedoire branch of the Bedoire family was created in 1777 when Sweden's envoy to Portugal, and titular governor, Jean de Bedoire was ennobled on 7 May 1777. The De Bedoire branch went extinct when he died on 30 December 1800.

== Members ==
- Frans Bedoire
- Jean Bedoire the Younger
