= Marycrest College Historic District =

Historic district in Iowa, United States

- U.S. National Register of Historic Places
- U.S. Historic district
- Davenport Register of Historic Properties
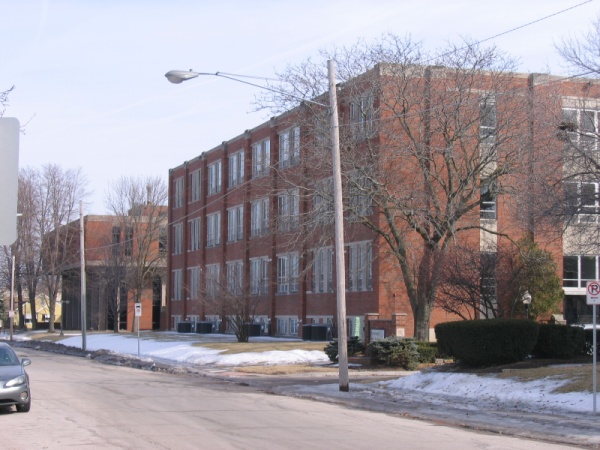

- Location within Iowa Location within the United States
- Location: Portions of the 1500 and 1600 blocks of W. 12th St., Davenport, Iowa
- Coordinates: 41°31′51.60″N 90°35′55.43″W
- Area: 15 acres (6.1 ha)
- Built: 1938, 1939, 1941
- Architect: Frederick G. Clausen; Temple and Temple; Raymond C. Whitaker
- Architectural style: Queen Anne; Jacobean Revival; Late Gothic Revival; Collegiate Gothic; Modern
- MPS: Davenport MRA
- NRHP reference No.: 04000341
- DRHP No.: 41

Significant dates
- Added to NRHP: April 14, 2004
- Designated DRHP: January 1, 2004

Marycrest College Historic District is located on a bluff overlooking the West End of Davenport, Iowa, United States. The district encompasses the campus of Marycrest College, which was a small, private collegiate institution. The school became Teikyo Marycrest University and finally Marycrest International University after affiliating with a Japanese educational consortium during the 1990s. The school closed in 2002 because of financial shortcomings. The campus has been listed on the Davenport Register of Historic Properties and on the National Register of Historic Places since 2004. At the time of its nomination, the historic district consisted of 13 resources, including six contributing buildings and five non-contributing buildings. Two of the buildings were already individually listed on the National Register.

== History ==
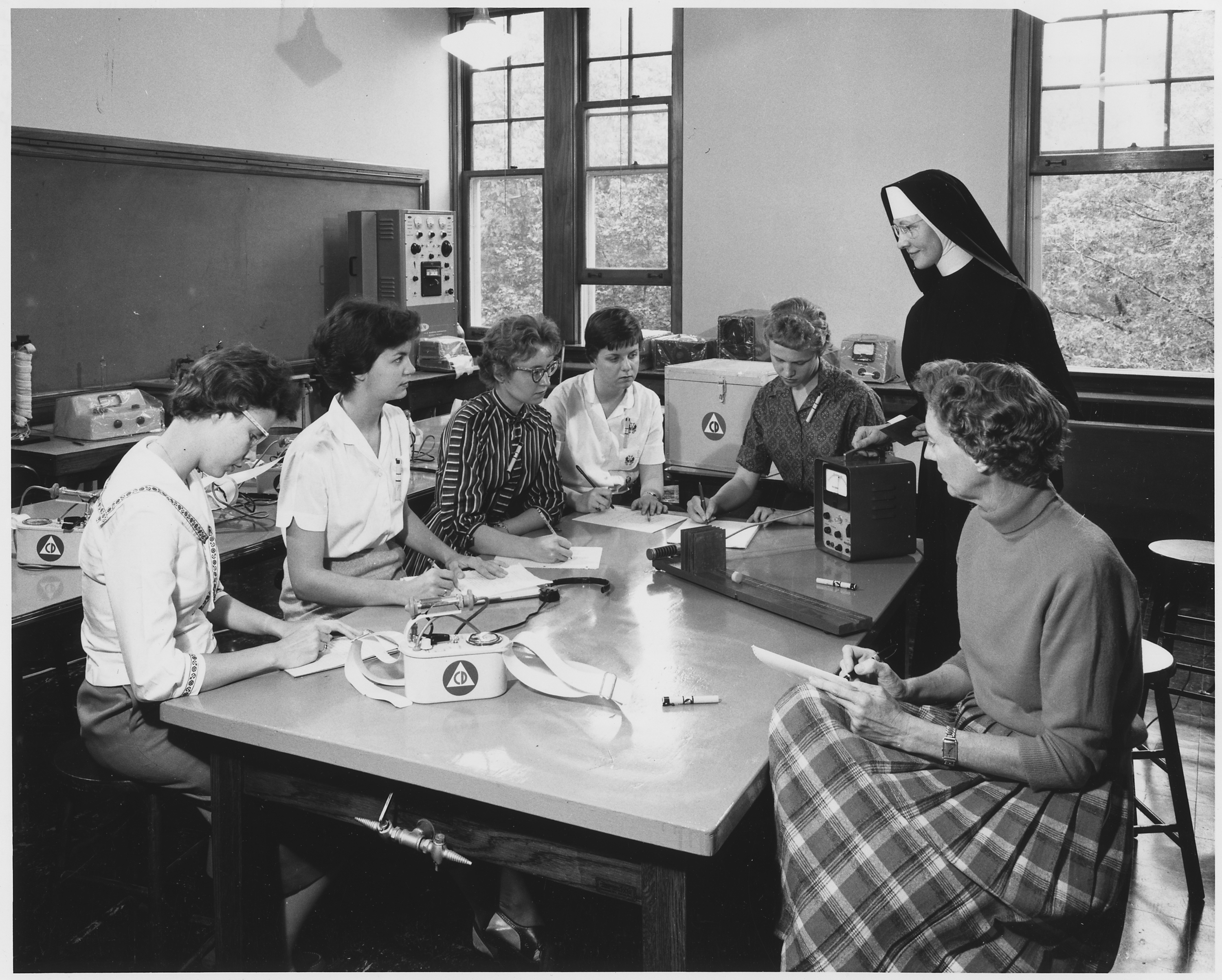
Sr. Mary Helene ven Horst, CHM and students c. 1960

Marycrest was founded as a Catholic women's college in 1939 by the Congregation of the Humility of Mary (CHM) at the request of Bishop Henry Rohlman of Davenport. Mother Mary Geraldine Upham, CHM, who had been the congregation's Mother Superior at that time, became the school's first president. She had previously founded St. Joseph's Junior College, later renamed Ottumwa Heights College, in 1925. Sister Hazel Marie Roth, CHM was the first Dean.

Initially, Marycrest was organized as a division of St. Ambrose College, and it was incorporated as a separate college in 1954. The North Central Association of Colleges and Secondary Schools independently accredited Marycrest in 1955 and said it "has the potential to be the Vassar of Catholic colleges." St. Ambrose and Marycrest planned to merge in the early 1970s. They chose a new name for the school, Newman College, before the merger was discontinued and both schools remained independent of each other.

Marycrest opened with 76 students in 1939 and it grew to 935 students in 1961, the year that Mother Geraldine died. The faculty in the same time period grew from 21 members to 67. As early as the mid-1940s, international students were welcomed to the campus. In 1969, educational opportunities were extended to men when the college became coeducational. In 1990, Marycrest College became affiliated with the Teikyo Yamanashi Education and Welfare Foundation of Japan and was renamed Teikyo Marycrest University. It was networked with Teikyo campuses around the world and its mission was dedicated to international education without prejudice, much like another Iowa school Teikyo Westmar University which also joined this affiliation in 1990. The institution ended its formal association with the Catholic Church at this time, though many of the Sisters continued to teach and work at the university.

During the early 1990s, Japanese students formed a substantial part of the enrollment of the university. When Japan's economy declined in the mid-1990s, enrollment at Marycrest also declined. In 1996, the institution's name was changed to Marycrest International University. This was an attempt to more fully reflect the global mission of the institution. It was also part of an effort to re-market the university in order to boost enrollment, which by this time had declined to approximately 500 students.

The campus was closed at the end of its 2001–2002 school year, as a result of continued enrollment declines and persistent financial difficulties. Many of the remaining students transferred to nearby schools, including Augustana College in Rock Island, Illinois. All of the academic records are now housed at the University of Iowa in Iowa City.

Marycrest International University was respected for its solid programs in education, social work, and nursing. In its later years, the university also developed an interdisciplinary program in computer graphics and web design. The campus newspaper was The Crest. Marycrest athletic teams were called the Eagles and included men and women's soccer, basketball, volleyball, and women's softball, competing in the National Association of Intercollegiate Athletics (NAIA). Annual traditions included Pig Roast, midnight breakfast, and A Taste of Culture.

Although the university is closed, the campus continues to serve an important role in the local community. In 2006, a residential community for senior citizens known as Marycrest Senior Campus was established in the residence halls. The Marycrest Campus became unified under common ownership and management in 2010.

== Athletics ==
The Marycrest International athletic teams were called the Eagles. The university was a member of the National Association of Intercollegiate Athletics (NAIA), primarily competing in the Midwest Collegiate Conference (MCC) from 1988–89 to 2001–02.

== Campus ==
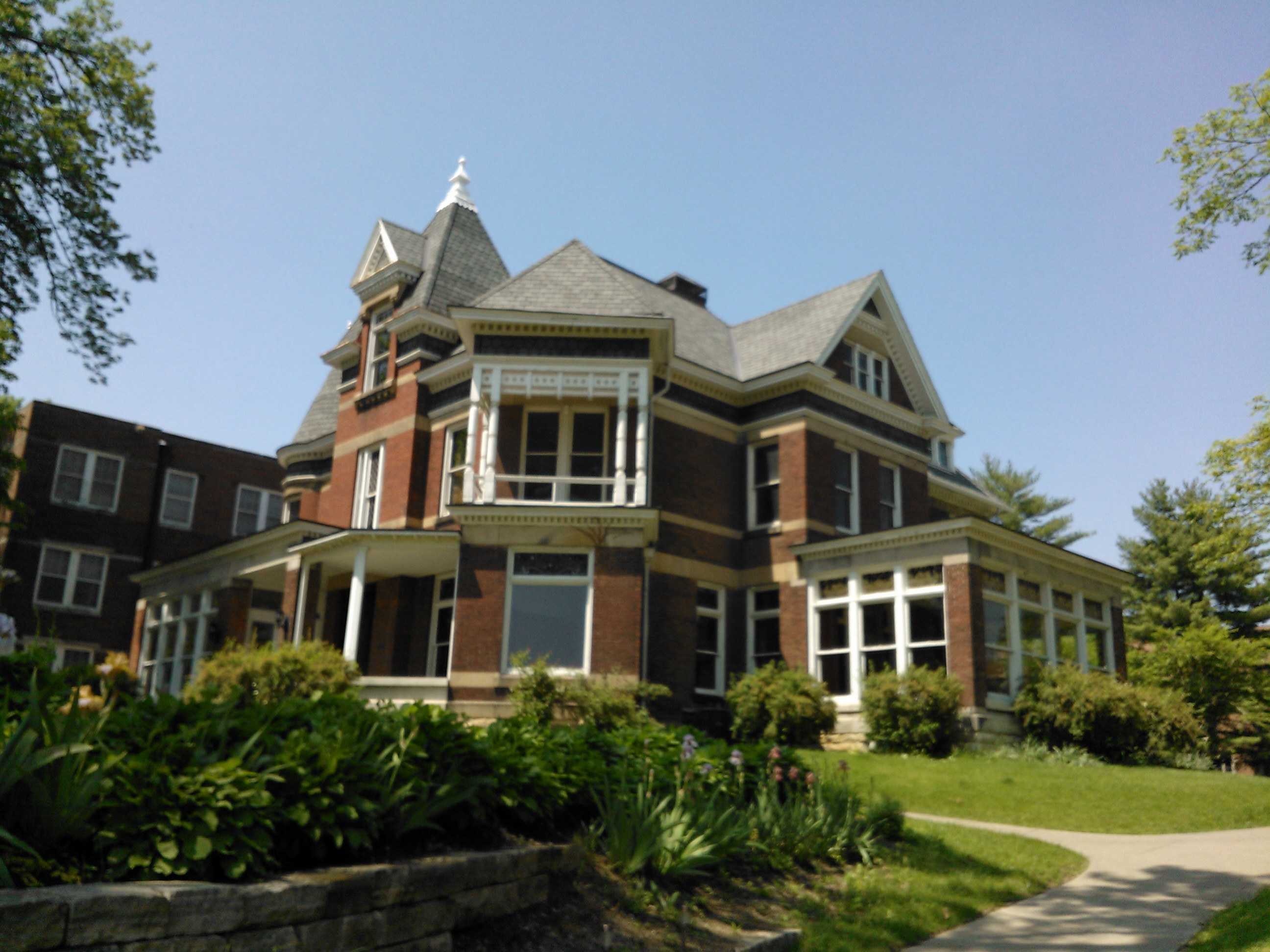
The Max Petersen House where the college began

The Marycrest College campus was located on the crest of a bluff 16 blocks west of downtown Davenport and 15 blocks north of the Mississippi River. It was bounded on the east by the Riverview Terrace neighborhood, which contains medium to large single-family homes. To the north is a residential neighborhood of mostly frame single-family houses that were built in the late 19th century and early 20th century. The former German-American commercial district was further north along Washington Street. Division Street was the campus' western boundary where the Putnam Museum and Fejervary Park are located. The south side of the campus is a steep bluff that rises 80 feet (24 m) from West 10th Street.

== Buildings ==
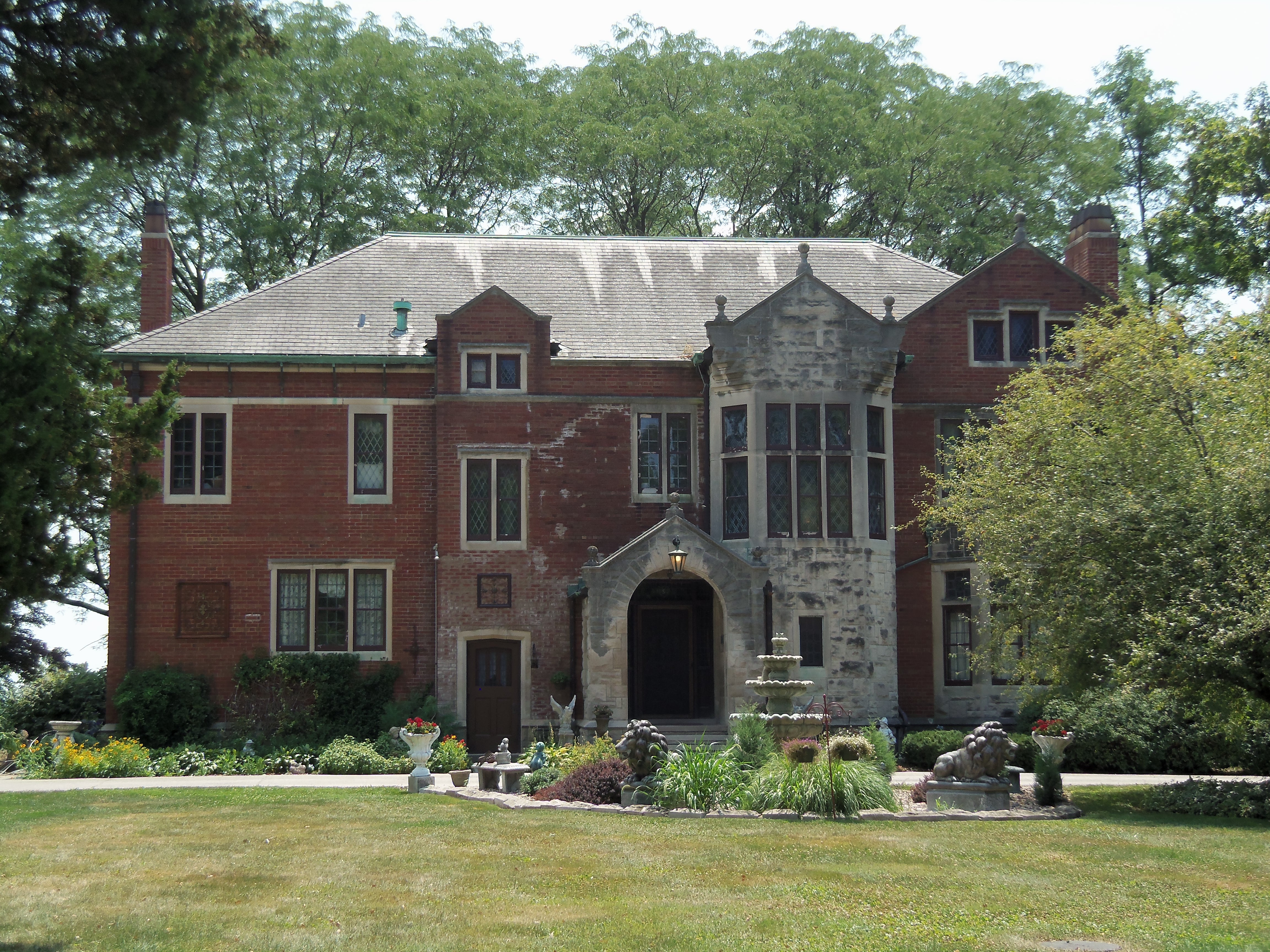
Dr. Kuno Struck House

The Marycrest campus itself was made up of 13 buildings. The earliest buildings were built around a rectangular-shaped open space. Newer buildings were built down the slope of the bluff, along West 12th Street to the east and finally across West 12th Street. The two oldest buildings were built as single-family homes that predate the establishment of the college. The Max Petersen House, known as Clifton Hill, is the place the Rev. Thomas Lawlor from St. Ambrose College acquired in 1937 for $50,000 for the new school. It is a 2 1/2-story, dark red brick, Queen Anne style house designed by Davenport architect Frederick G. Clausen. It was built in 1888 for Max Petersen who was a partner in his family's prosperous retail store, the J.H.C. Petersen's Sons' Store. The house served a variety of purposes including a convent, dining hall, and music classrooms. The second house is the Dr. Kuno Struck House, which was also called Clifton Manor. It was acquired by Marycrest in 1978 and served the college as a community center. This house is also 2 1/2-stories but is covered in pink-red brick and a rock-faced stone that is smoothly dressed. It is the only house in Davenport built in the Jacobean Revival style. Built in 1910, the house was designed by Clausen & Clausen of Davenport. The Struck's garage, built in 1927 and used as a maintenance building by the college, is also a contributing property in the historic district. Both houses are individually listed on the National Register of Historic Places.

=== Residence Halls ===
West Hall

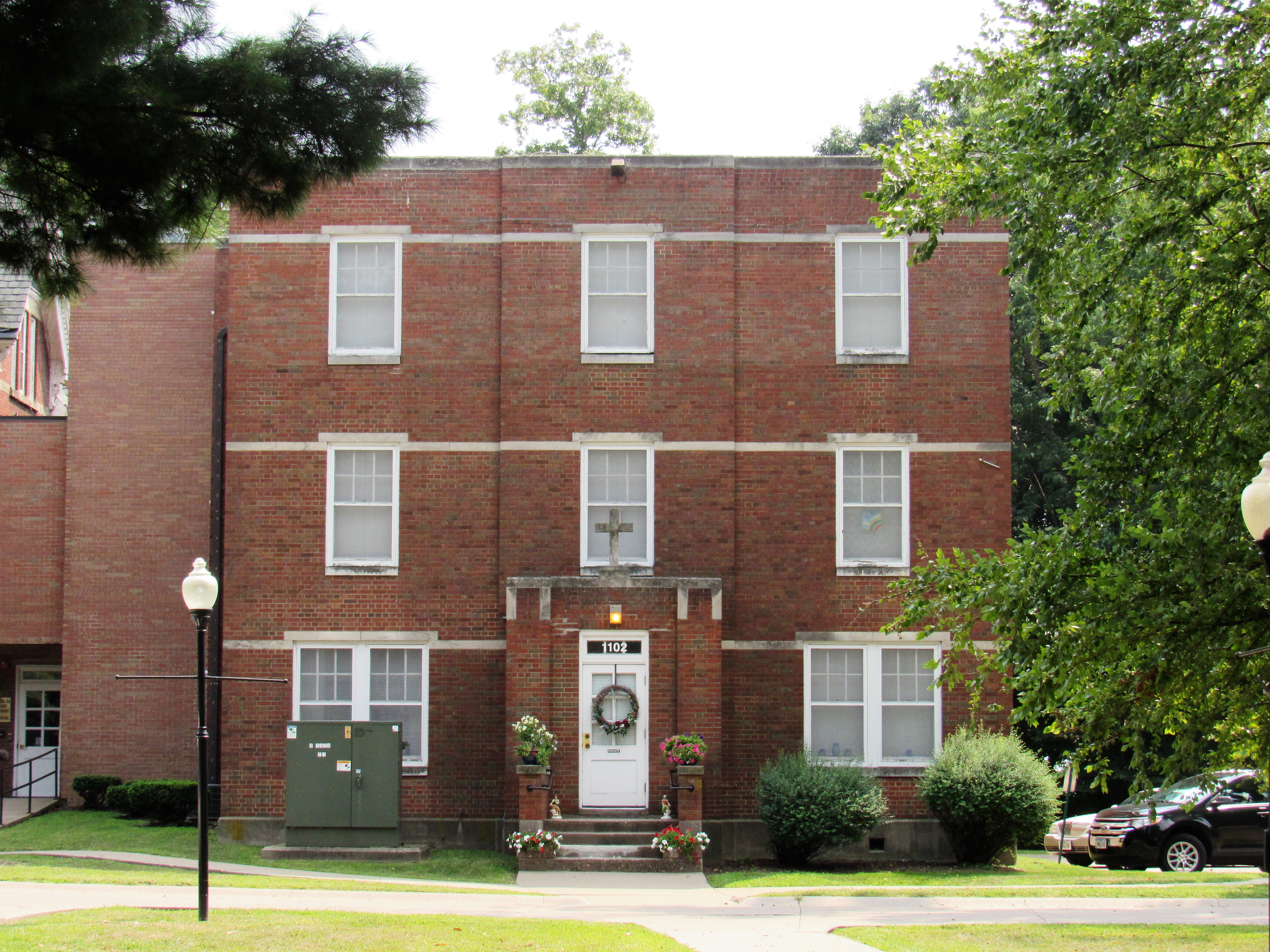
West Hall

The first building built specifically for a dormitory was West Hall. It was built as a two-story structure in 1941 by the John C. Tunnicliff Construction Company for $23,950. It is possible that it was designed by Davenport architect Seth Temple, but that cannot be substantiated. A third floor was added in 1958. The building is connected to the Max Petersen House by a narrow single-story corridor. Measuring 39 by 86 feet (12 by 26 m), the building follows a rectangular plan. Like all buildings built for the college through the 1960s, its exterior was composed of a mottled red face brick that was manufactured by the Hydraulic Press Brick Company of St. Louis. It sits on a poured concrete foundation. The main facade faces to the north and is divided into three bays. The center bay projects slightly forward. The east and west elevations are divided into eight bays. Belt courses separate floors on the end bays and the center bays are slightly recessed. Bedford stone is used for the belt courses between the floors, the plain coping, the vestibule trim, and the lintels and window sills. A stone cross is located on the center of the parapet above the main entrance vestibule. It is a contributing building.

Lawlor Hall

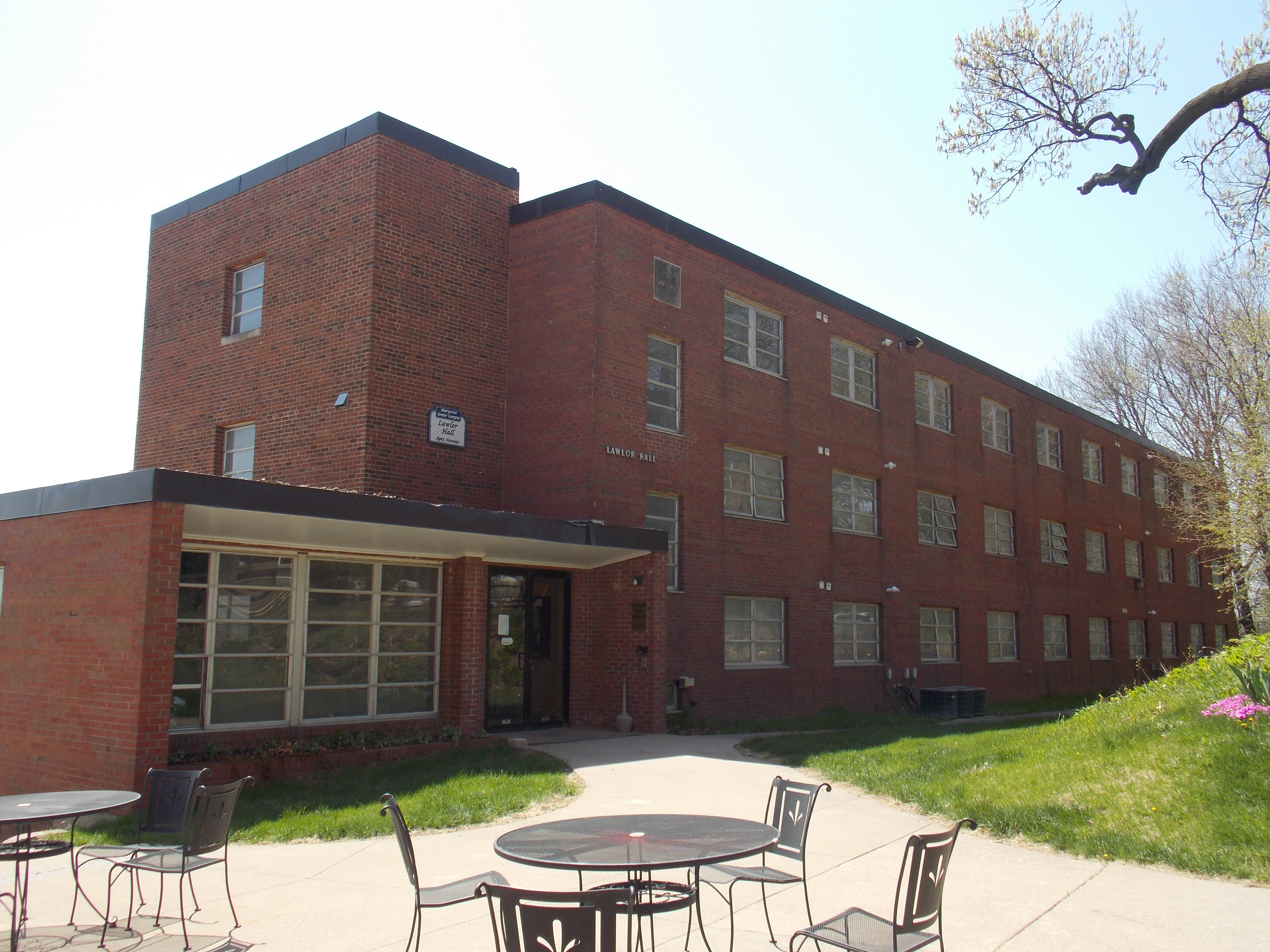
Lawlor Hall

The first building that did not front the central campus on top of the hill was Lawlor Hall. It sits 10 feet (3 m) to 20 feet (6 m) down the slope of the bluff from the Max Petersen House and West Hall. Designed by Davenport architect Raymond C. Whitaker, the first two floors were built in 1955 for $150,000 to house freshmen students, hence its original name was Freshman Hall. Once again John C. Tunnicliff Construction Company served as contractor. The third floor was added four years later with Whitaker again serving as architect and Tunnicliff and MacDonald as general contractors. The 164-by-36-foot (50 by 11 m) building follows a rectangular plan and has an exposed basement, which gives it the appearance as a four-story building from the south. While it is a Modern architectural style building its exterior is composed of the same brick as West Hall. The flat coping of the parapet is covered with brushed aluminum. The main entrance is located in a recessed bay in a single-story section on the east side of the building and faces to the north. The north elevation is 10 bays and the south elevation is 13 bays. Most bays have a paired three-light window group. A few of the bays on the south side have single windows. It is a contributing building.

Rohlman Hall

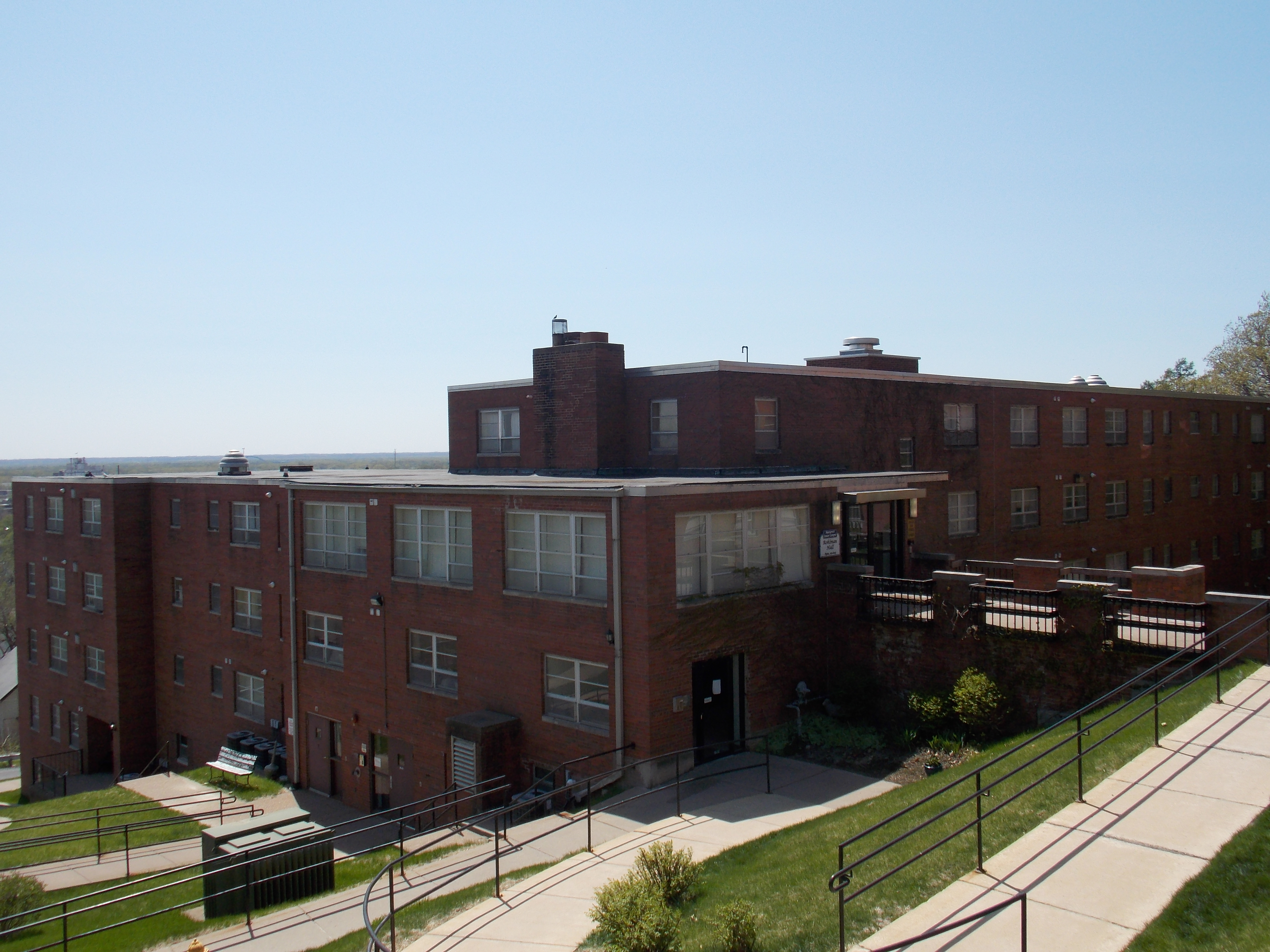
Rohlman Hall

Raymond Whitaker and Ken Wagner designed Rohlman Hall, which was completed in 1966 by O. Jorgensen & Sons of Clinton, Iowa. It is 30 feet (9 m) down the slope from Lawlor Hall and 50 feet (15 m) lower than the center of campus. The 197-by-123-foot (60 by 37 m) building has a total of six floors in two wings that form an L-shaped plan. The east-west oriented wing is three stories above grade and a partially exposed basement visible on the south side. The north-south oriented wing sits lower than the other wing and includes two floors plus a ground floor on the east elevation and a lower floor plus a basement floor beneath the ground floor on the south and west elevations. In many ways, Rohlman Hall is similar in design to Lawler Hall. It is built of the same brick, it does not feature a standard main facade, the coping is covered with brushed aluminum, and most bays have a paired three-light window group. Like Lawlor, the main entrance is located on the east side of the building and faces north, but here it is located in a separate wing rather than a single story entryway. Two flights of concrete steps on the eastern side of Lawlor Hall connect to a 10 feet (3 m) wide suspended concrete bridge that leads to the main entrance of Rohlman Hall. It is a non-contributing building.

=== Mixed-Use Halls ===
Upham Hall

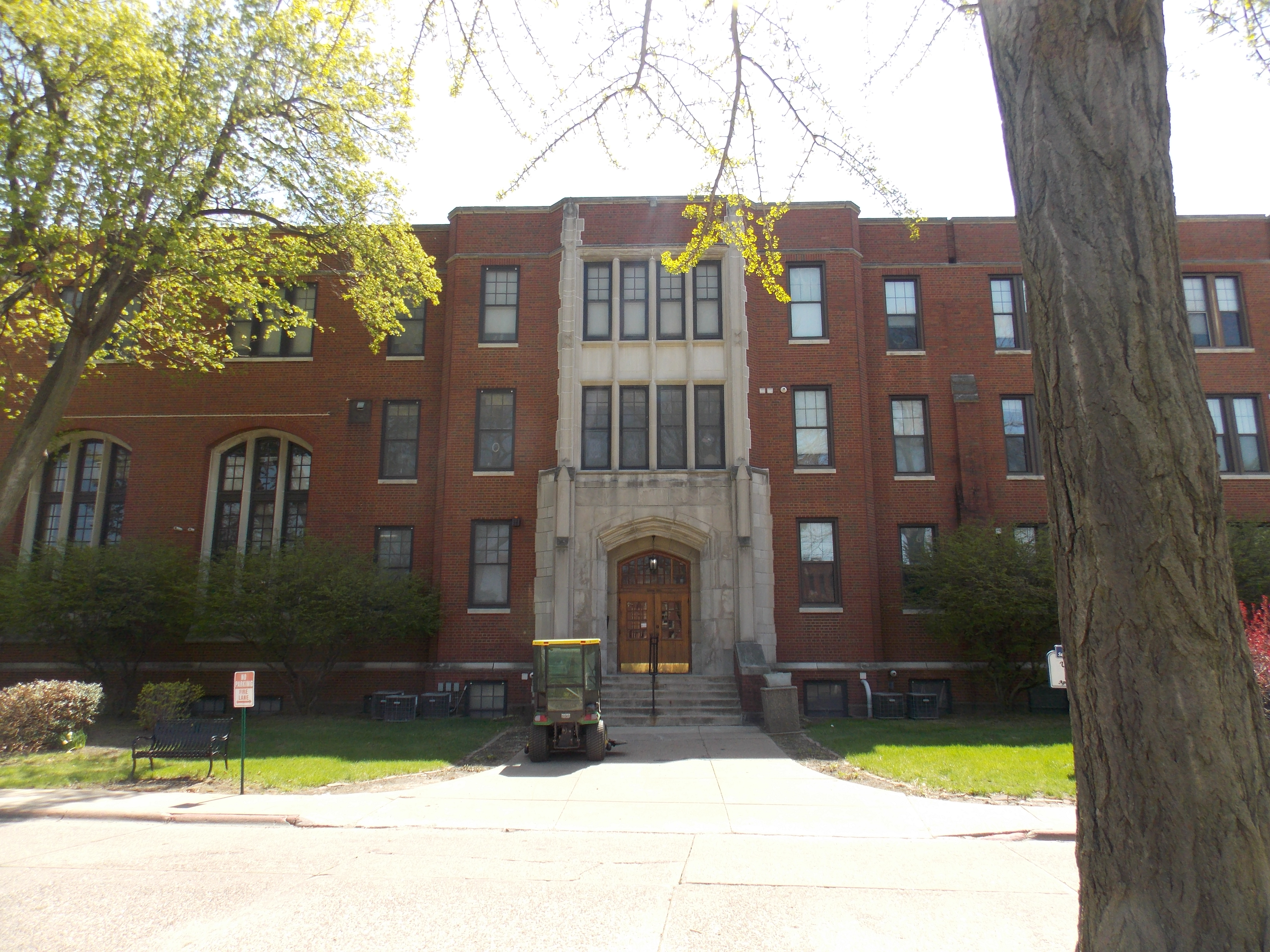
Upham Hall

The first building built specifically for college purposes was Upham Hall. It was originally named the Administration Building when it was built in 1939 and was also known as Liberal Arts Hall before it was named after Mother Mary Geraldine in 1963. The building was designed by Seth Temple and his son Arthur Temple in the Collegiate Gothic style. It was built by John C. Tunnicliff Construction Company for $165,000. Upham Hall rises three floors on the north facade, which faces the center of the campus, and four flours and a tall foundation level on the south elevation. The foundation of the building is poured concrete, the walls are of the mottled red face brick used in other Marycrest buildings, and Bedford stone trim. The rectangular building features a central pavilion of four bays that is faced with Bedford stone to the third floor. Extending to the east and west are wings of five bays each whose brick is laid in an English cross bond with alternating courses of headers and stretchers. The Tudor arched main entrance is flanked by simple stone buttresses with vertical ornamentation. Simple brick buttresses separate the bays on the west wing. The east wing is dominated by four two-story Tudor arched windows. They denote the location of the 300-seat auditorium whose stage is against the central pavilion. Upham Hall has been used for a variety of purposes including as administrative offices, classrooms, some of which were used temporarily as dormitory rooms, faculty offices, the first chapel, an auditorium, and a gymnasium. It is a key contributing building, and a utility shed immediately south of Upham Hall (c. 1940) is also a contributing building.

Petersen Hall

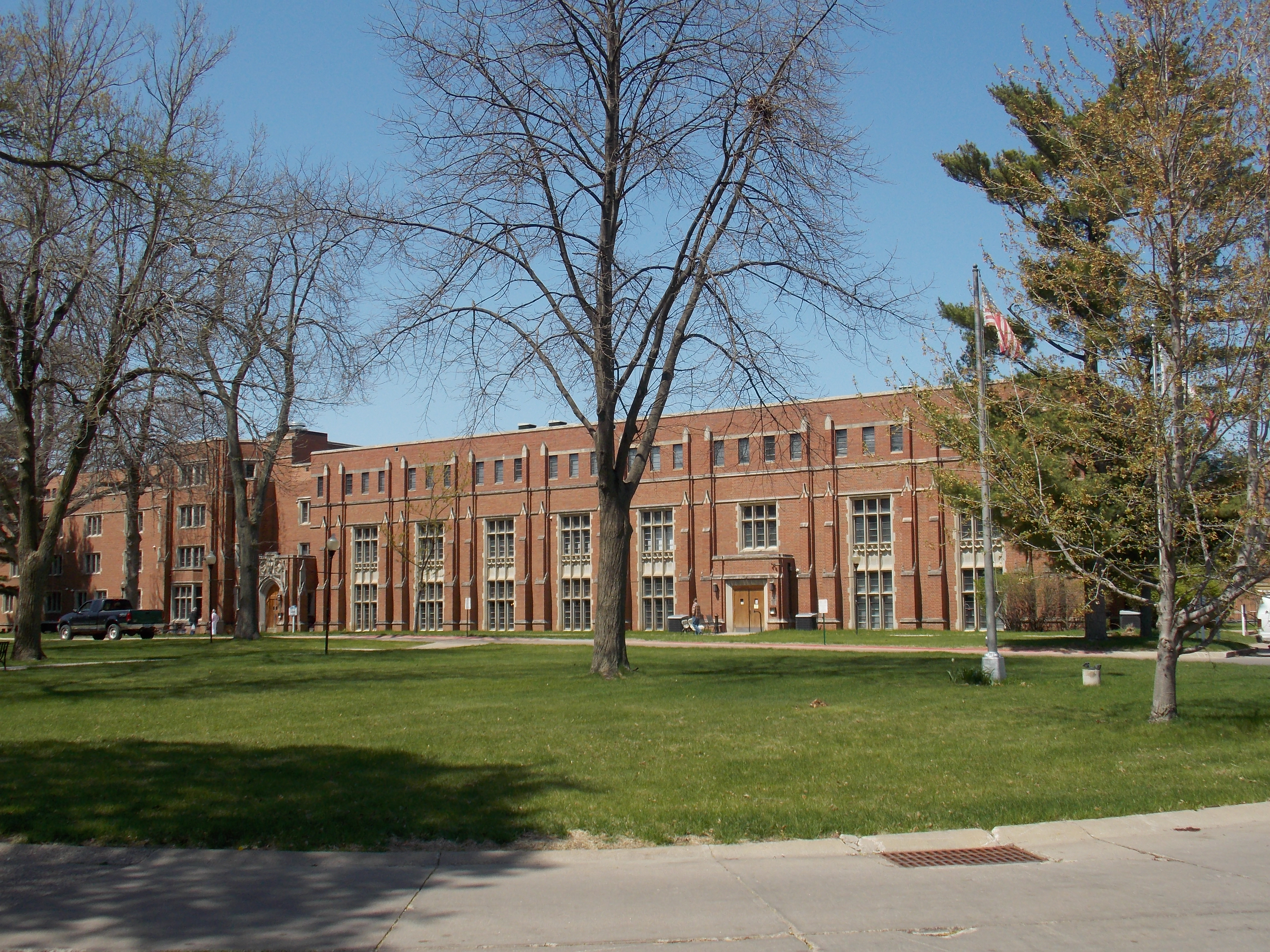
Petersen Hall

Temple and Temple designed the concept of Petersen Hall to be built in three stages, which it was. The building embraces the Late Gothic Revival and Jacobethan Revival styles. The Temples completed the drawings for the first phase that was built in 1948 and for the second phase that was completed three years later. Raymond Whitaker completed drawings for the third phase that was completed in 1962. The first phase of the building is located in the center and is denoted by its four-story tower. The 186-by-40-foot (57 by 12 m) structure was built by John C. Tunnicliff for $250,000. It housed dormitory rooms on the west, a lounge and business offices in the center, the primary kitchen was located in the basement, and a cafeteria and a chapel on the east. The west wing forms the second phase that was completed in 1951 by Tunnicliff for $160,000. The 50-by-70-foot (15 by 21 m) section contained dormitory rooms. Priester Construction Company of Davenport completed the third section for $280,000 in 1962. It provided additional space for the cafeteria and chapel on the first two floors and dormitory rooms on the third floor. The building was originally named North Hall and was renamed in honor of the Petersen family around 1964. It is a key contributing building.

=== Single-Use Buildings ===
Cone Library

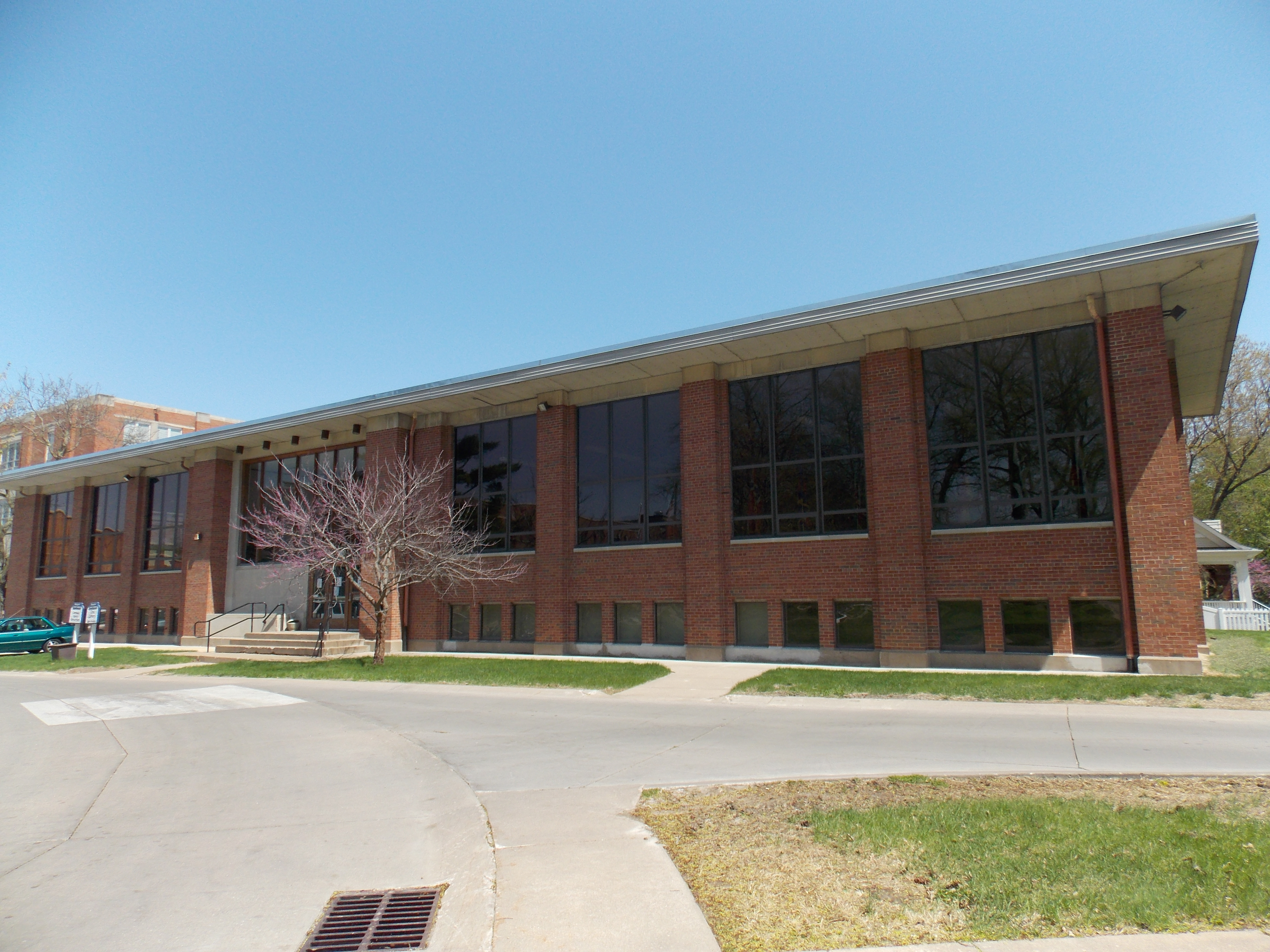
Cone Library

Apart from residence halls, the Cone Library is the first single-purpose academic building constructed on campus. Raymond Whitaker designed the building that was constructed by H. George Schloemer in 1958 for $250,000. The 186-by-40-foot (57 by 12 m) Modern structure follows an irregular rectangular plan and is dominated by large plate glass windows. The main facade of the building is divided into eight bays with the main entrance just off center. The entrance bay is set off by stone. The building's mottled red face brick is laid in American bond with a header course on every sixth course. Another dominate feature of the building are the deep eaves that overhang the walls. Along the upper part of the wall is a wide band of stone. The window lintels are likewise stone. There are also three basement level windows in each bay, save for the entrance bay. The east side of the south elevation is composed of solid brick with no windows. It features a decorative cut stone design that portrays Marycrest's insignia that is embedded in the wall. It was created by Sister Mary Clarice Ebert, CHM, who taught in the college's art department. The front section of the main level of the interior was divided into three large rooms. They were separated by wood and glass panel walls. The periodical reading room was on the north, the main desk and card catalog were in the center, and the reference reading room was on the south. The stacks were located across the back of the building. The basement originally housed the student union in the south half and an audio-visual room, alumnae office, and receiving room on the north. It is a non-contributing building.

Walsh Hall

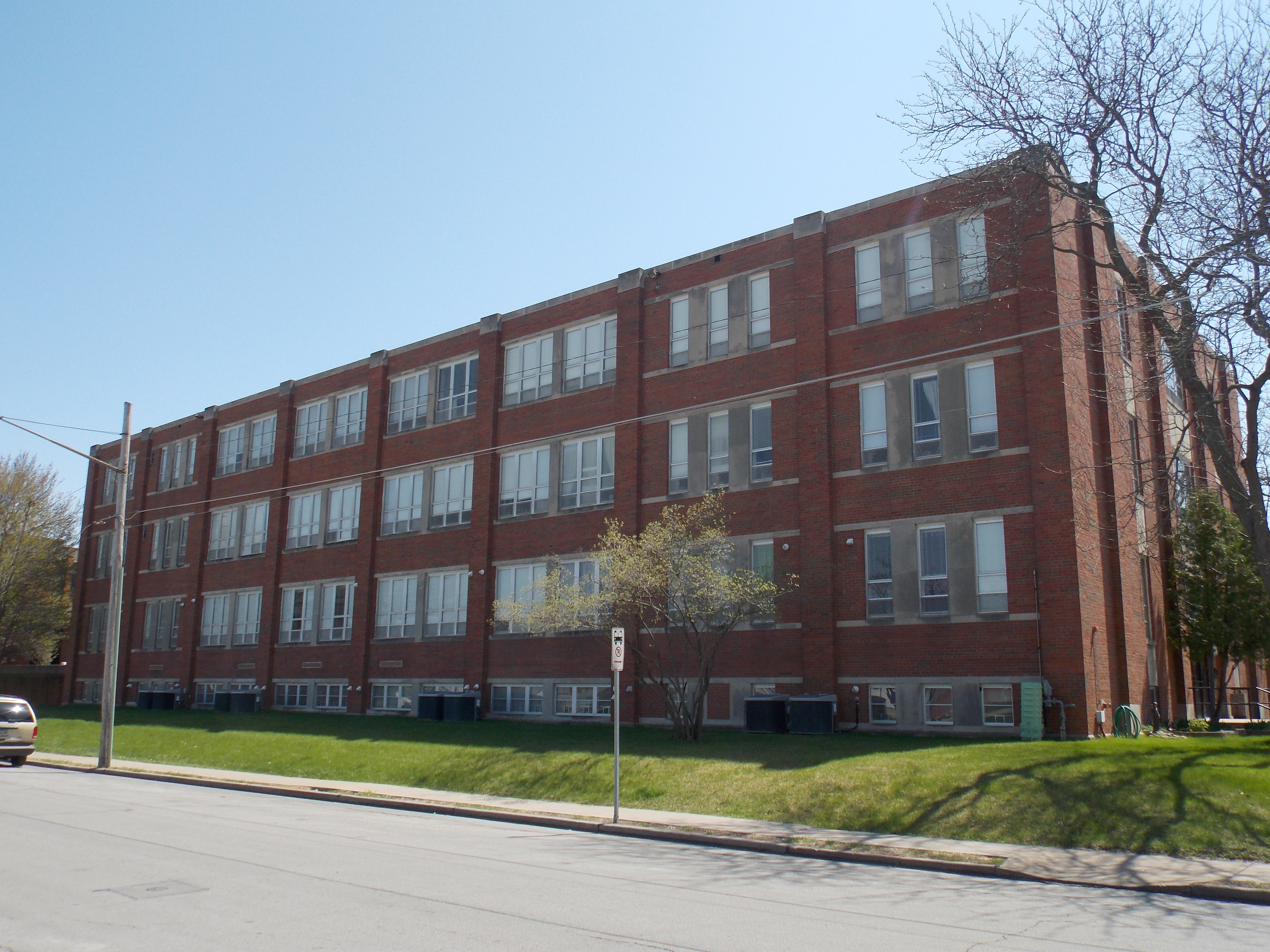
Walsh Hall

Raymond Whitaker was already in retirement when he designed Walsh Hall with the assistance of Kenneth Wagner. It was completed in 1964 by O. Jorgensen & Sons of Clinton for $650,000. The four-story structure housed science classrooms and laboratories. The 162-by-72-foot (49 by 22 m) building follows a rectangular plan with its main facade on the west elevation. The exterior brick is laid in American bond with a header course set between every fifth course. Parapet walls capped with stone rise above a flat roof. Brick piers separate the bays. The main facade is five bays while the side elevations are eight bays. The west elevation is composed of the main entrance in the center bay with windows similar to others found in the building above it. The center bay is flanked by two bays with a single column of windows centered in the bay. There is a combination of single, paired and triple window units in the building. The east elevation features window groupings similar to those found on the north elevation. The south elevation features an unusual arrangement of windows and stone panels that form a cross in the center bay. The clustered window groups have stone sills, frames and mullions. The stone belt courses on each floor double as window lintels. It is a non-contributing building.

Nursing Education Building

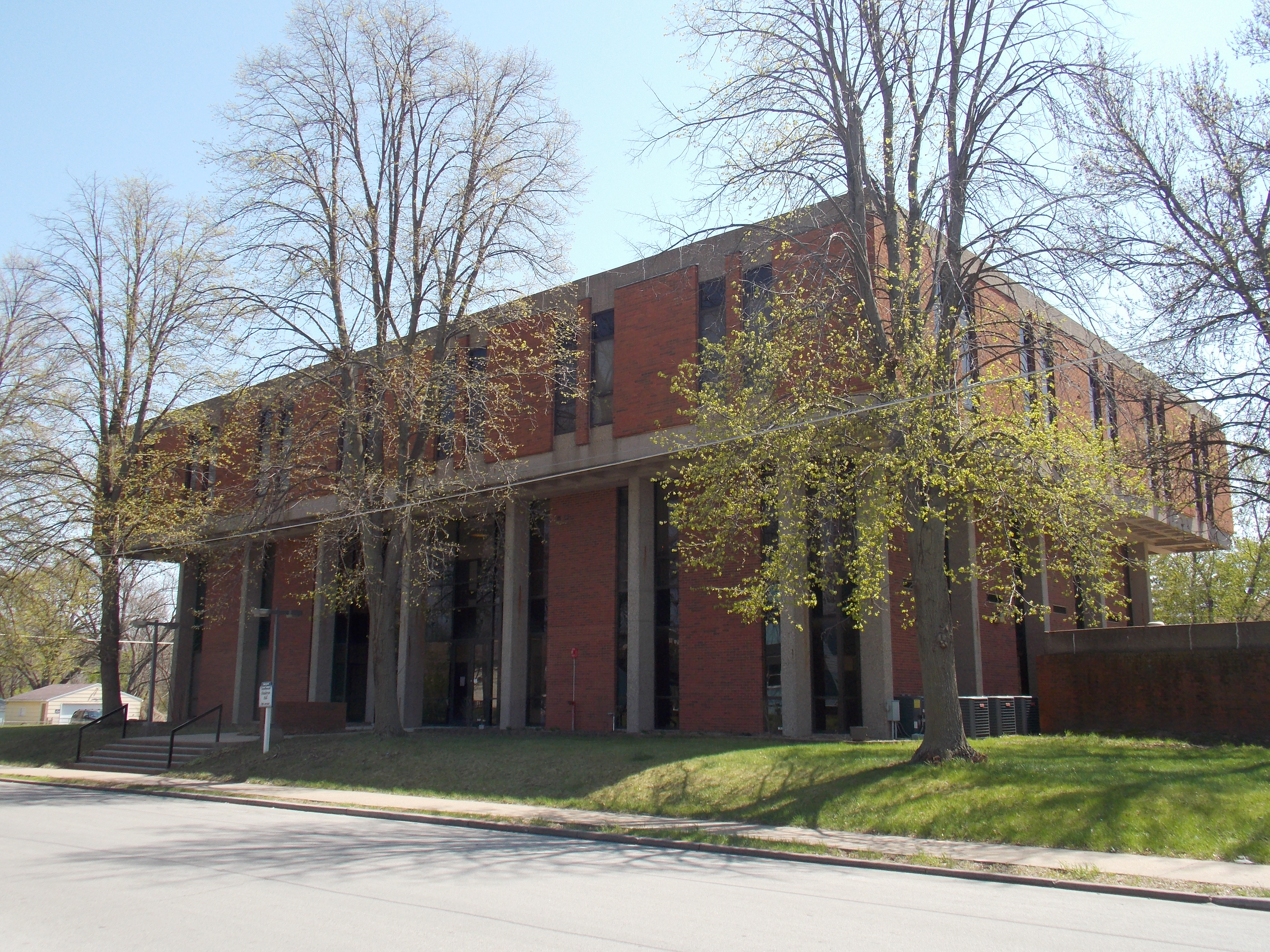
Nursing Education Building

The Davenport architectural firm of Charles Richardson Associates designed the building that was built by Priester Construction in 1973 for $1.9 million. The 103-by-71-foot (31 by 22 m), three-story structure follows a rectangular plan. There is a single-story lecture hall-auditorium that is attached to the west side of the building on the basement level. The exterior walls are composed of reinforced concrete and are partially faced with reddish-brown brick that is laid in a running bond. Both the north and south elevations are divided into seven bays and the east and west elevations are divided into three bays. The most dominant feature is the building's third floor that cantilevers around the entire perimeter of the structure. It is supported by square, pre-cast concrete columns. The building reflects the influence of the Miesian and New Formalism architectural styles. The windows on the first and second floor are panels of tinted glass, with vertical window pairs on the third floor. Matching entrances are located in the center bay on the north and south elevations. The building housed a television studio and control room, lecture halls, offices, classrooms, a student lounge, study rooms, a laboratory, faculty lounge, media workroom and conference rooms. It is a non-contributing building.

Activities Center

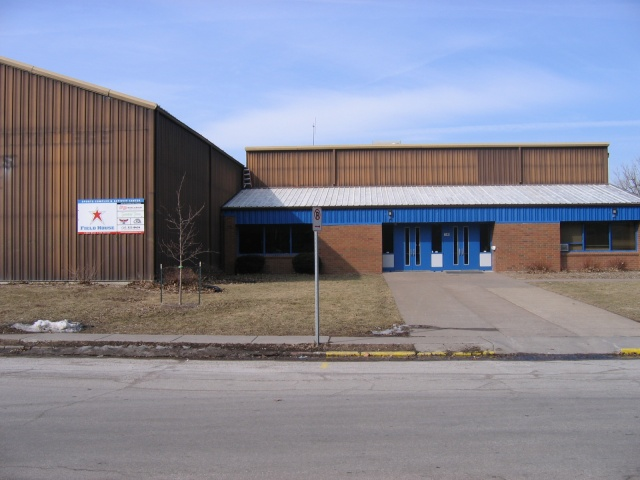
Activities Center

The Activities Center was the only building constructed on the north side of West 12th Street. Designed by the Des Moines architectural firm of Frevent, Ramsey & Dray, it was constructed by Priester Construction Company in 1978. The 225-by-192-foot (69 by 59 m) single-story structure followed a T-shaped plan. Unlike all of the other buildings on the Marycrest campus, its exterior is covered with brown corrugated steel. It features a broad gable that faces the street. The roof over the gymnasium portion of the building is also corrugated steel. The facility housed four combination basketball/volleyball/tennis courts, a 1/8 mi (0.20 km) jogging track, a fitness center, and the student center. The larger gymnasium section is joined to a smaller wing off of the east side that housed offices. It is faced with mottled tan and brown brick over concrete block on the lower portion of the walls and corrugated steel above. The office wing is divided into three bays, and it is capped by a shed roof that extends along the south side. The recessed main entrance is located in the center bay. The building continues to house a sports complex known as Beyond The Baseline. It is a non-contributing building.

== Notable alumni ==
- Kevin O'Neill (MA 1983), NBA and collegiate basketball coach, formerly the coach of the USC Trojans
