= Thompson Island (Antarctica) =

Island in Antarctica

Thompson Island (66°0′S 110°7′E) is the largest and northeasternmost of the Balaena Islands, situated about 1 kilometre (1/2 nautical mile) from the coast of Antarctica and 28 kilometres (15 nautical miles) northeast of the Windmill Islands. The island consists of two rocky knolls separated by a low saddle of snow (it may actually be two islands connected by ice). This feature was first photographed from aircraft of U.S. Navy Operation Highjump in February 1947, and was mapped from that photography by Gardner Blodgett in 1955. It was visited by a party of the ANARE (Australian National Antarctic Research Expeditions) on January 19, 1956, and named for Richard Thompson, Administrative Officer, Antarctic Division, Melbourne, who was second-in-command for several years of ANARE relief expeditions to Heard Island, Macquarie Island and Mawson Station.

== See also ==
- List of antarctic and sub-antarctic islands
