= Balaena Islands =

Island group in Antarctica

Balaena Island
- Location within Antarctica

Geography
- Location: Antarctica
- Coordinates: 66°1′S 111°6′E

Administration
- Administered under the Antarctic Treaty System

Demographics
- Population: Uninhabited

The Balaena Islands are a small group of rocky islands lying close to the coast of Antarctica, 19 kilometres (10 nmi) northeast of Cape Folger. They were first mapped from air photos taken by U.S. Navy Operation Highjump, 1946–47, and were named by the Advisory Committee on Antarctic Names after the British floating factory Balaena, from which sketches of Knox Coast and Budd Coast were obtained as the result of reconnaissance flights and shipboard observations in 1947.

== See also ==
- List of antarctic and sub-antarctic islands
- Petersen Bank
