= Petersen Bank =

- Submerged bank Petersen Bank (Antarctica)
- Interactive map of Petersen Bank
- Ocean: Southern Ocean

Petersen Bank (65°45′S 109°55′E) is a submarine bank in the Mawson Sea extending north-northwest from the coast of Antarctica, just west of Balaena Islands. A portion of the bank was sounded by ships of U.S. Navy Operation Windmill, 1947–48. The bank was more fully delineated by ANARE (Australian National Antarctic Research Expeditions) during January 1956 and 1957. Named by the ANARE for Captain Hans C. Petersen, master of the Kista Dan, who explored the bank in this vessel in January 1956.
