= William G. Pietersen =

South African businessman (born 1937)

Willie Pietersen (born 24 September 1937 (age 88)) is an international businessman, author, and professor at Columbia University.

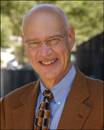
William Pietersen

William Gerard Pietersen was born in East London, South Africa to Willem Gerhardus DuPlessis Pietersen and Hester Jacomina Francina (née Müller). He is six feet, four inches tall and of Dutch, German and French ancestry. Pietersen attended Rhodes University in Grahamstown, South Africa, where he earned a BA in law and economics and an LLB in law and was chairman of the Students Representative Council. He was awarded a Rhodes Scholarship to Oxford University in England where he received an MA in jurisprudence. After practicing law, he embarked on an international business career. By 1974, at age 36, Pietersen had become one of the youngest Managing Directors in the history of Unilever. Over a period of twenty years he served as the CEO of multibillion-dollar businesses such as Lever Foods, Seagram USA, Tropicana and Sterling Winthrop's Consumer Health Group.

Pietersen has served as a director on several boards including the Institute for the Future (IFTF), a think tank based in Silicon Valley.

In 1998, Willie was named Professor of the Practice of Management at the Columbia University Graduate School of Business. He specializes in strategy and the leadership of change, and his methods and ideas, especially Strategic Learning, are widely applied within Columbia's executive education programs, and also in numerous corporations. He has served as a teacher and advisor to many global companies, including American Express, Aviva plc, Bausch & Lomb, Boeing, CNA Financial Corp., Chubb Corp., Deloitte, DePuy, Electrolux, Ericsson, ExxonMobil, Federal Home Loan Bank of Atlanta, Henry Schein Inc., Johnson & Johnson, Novartis, Pandora (jewelry), SAP AG, UGI Corp., United Nations Federal Credit Union, Univation Technologies and also the Girl Scouts of the USA.

Willie is the author of three books: Reinventing Strategy, published in 2002, introduced the underlying principles and application tools for Strategic Learning.

Strategic Learning, March 2010, builds on these ideas and more extensive practical guidelines.

Leadership: The Inside Story: Time-Tested Prescriptions for Those Who Seek to Lead, published in 2024, offers insights into effective leadership principles.

Articles about business strategy by Willie have appeared in the award-winning journal Leader to Leader, Financial Times, The European Business Review, and Columbia Business School's Ideas and Insights.
