= Brugjeld–Peterson Family Farmstead District =

Historic district in Iowa, United States

- Brugjeld–Peterson Family; Farmstead District
- U.S. National Register of Historic Places
- U.S. Historic district
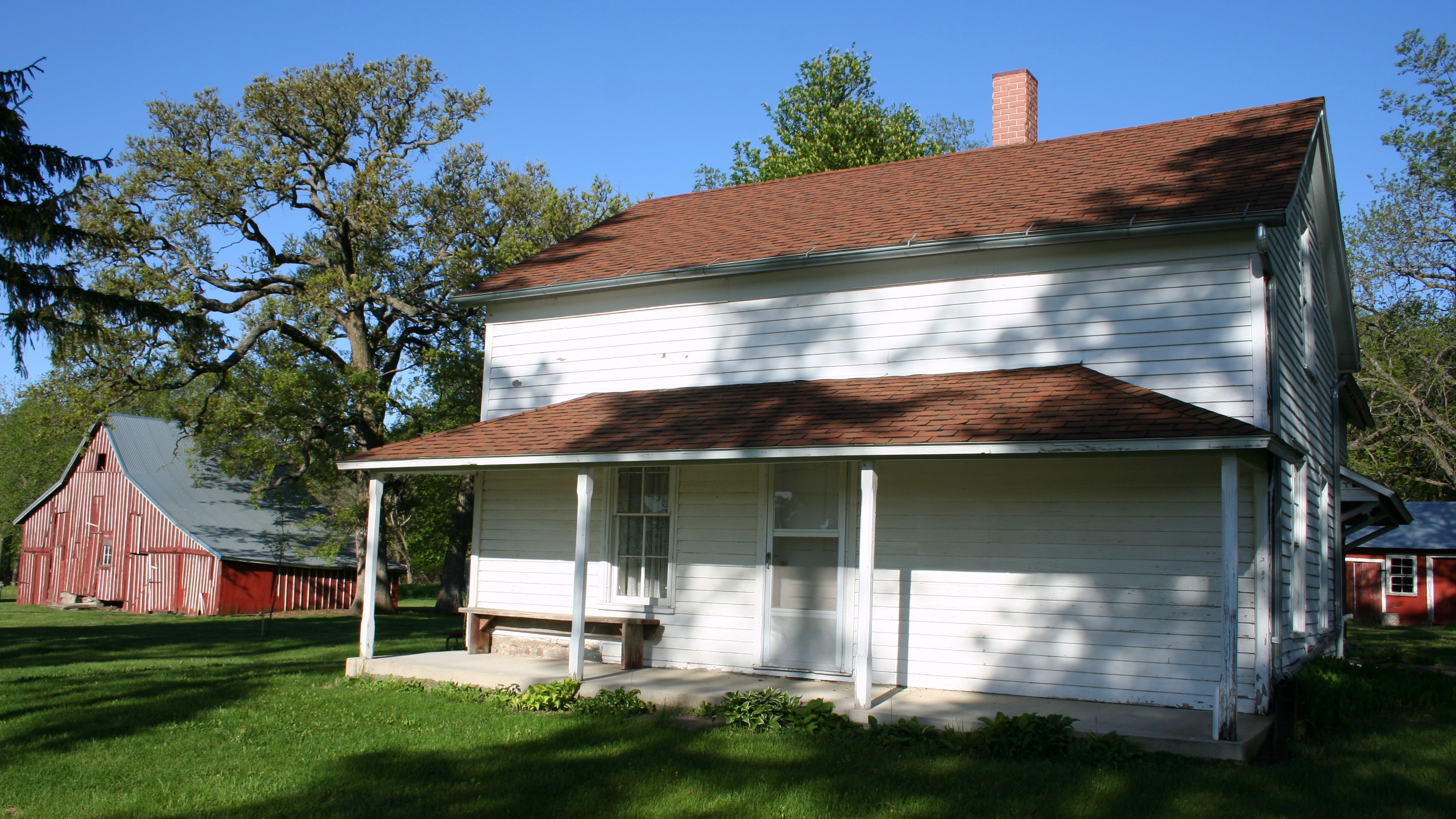
- The 1870 Petersen house

- Location within Iowa Location within the United States
- Location: 2349 450th Ave.
- Nearest city: Wallingford, Iowa
- Coordinates: 43°18′17″N 94°42′02″W
- Area: 1.7 acres (0.69 ha)
- Built: 1870
- Built by: Peder N. Brugjeld; Peder N. Peterson
- NRHP reference No.: 00000326
- Added to NRHP: April 6, 2000

The Brugjeld–Peterson Family Farmstead District, also known as Lakeside Farm and the Peterson Point Historical Farmstead, is a historic district in rural Emmet County, Iowa, United States, near the town of Wallingford. It was listed on the National Register of Historic Places in 2000.

== Description ==
The farmstead is located on a high strip of land located between High Lake on the west and a wetland, Cunningham Slough, on the east. The historic district is made up of ten contributing elements. The seven contributing buildings include the house, barn, blacksmith shop complex, cook/wash house, chicken coop, hog house, and sheep barn. The three contributing structures are the cob shed, wood shed, and com crib. The house was a log structure built in 1870 by Peder N. Brugjeld and his son Peder N. Peterson. Clapboard siding covers the exterior. A stone addition was built onto it in 1895 by Peder N. Peterson. The barn was built sometime between the 1870s and 1890. The rest of the buildings and structures date from the early to mid-20th century, with the exception of the corn crib, which is from the late 19th century to early 20th century.

The historic district reflects Norwegian-American settlement, and the importance of blacksmithing as a commercial/industrial feature of the rural economy. Peder and Gjertrud Brugjeld and their six children left the Brugjeld farm near Balestrand, Norway in 1848. They sailed on the Dorothea to the United States. After their arrival, they lived in Dane County, Wisconsin before they settled in Emmet County. Four generations of the Peterson family owned the farm until 1996 when Maynard Peterson donated it to Emmet County.

The farm and surrounding 40 acres (16 ha) are maintained and operated by the Emmet County Conservation Department and the Emmet County Conservation Foundation as an interpretive site and as a historic museum.
