= John N. Peterson Farm =

Historic farm in North Carolina, United States

- U.S. National Register of Historic Places
- U.S. Historic district
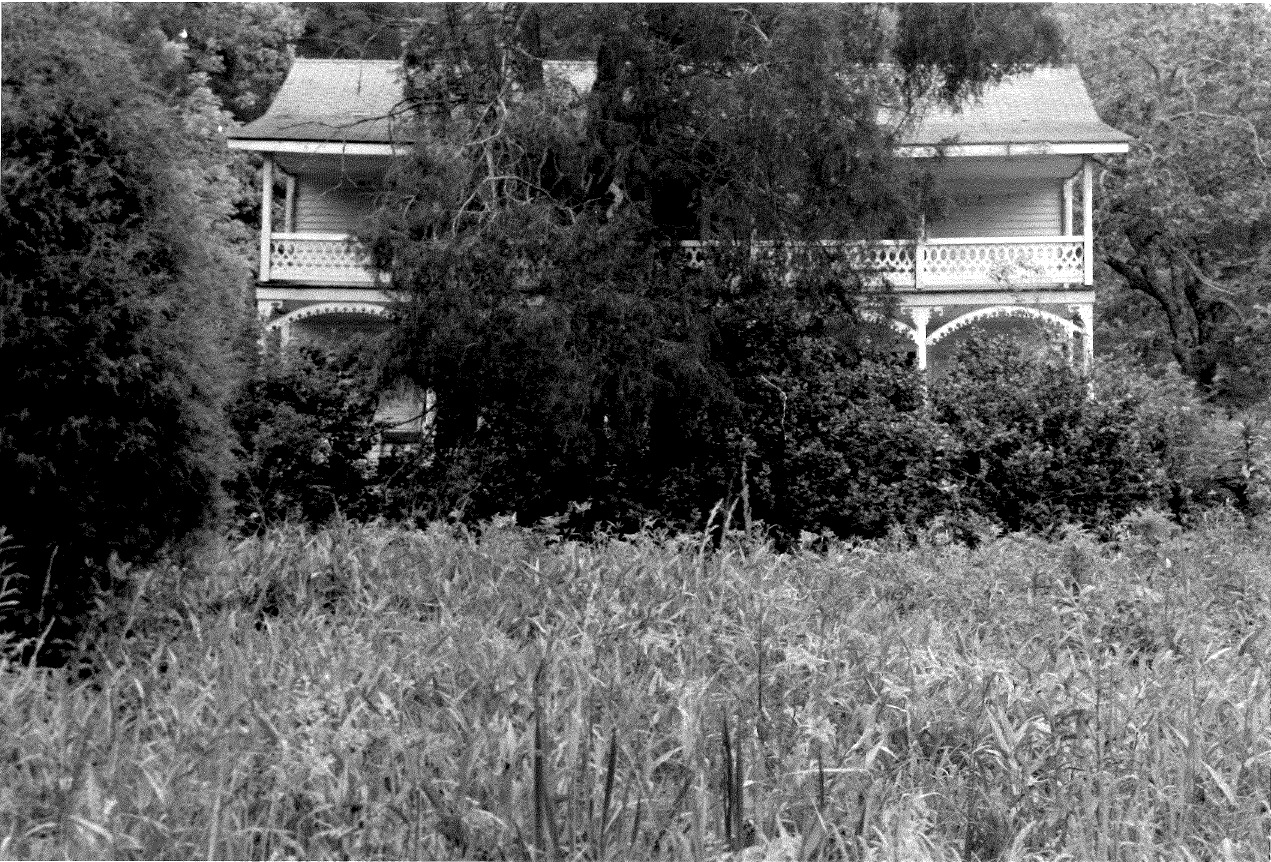
- The Peterson Farm House, obstructed by a tree.

- Location within North Carolina Location within the United States
- Location: E side of SR 1321 just N of jct. with SR 1322, Poplar, North Carolina
- Coordinates: 36°05′25″N 82°19′48″W
- Area: 35.8 acres (14.5 ha)
- Built: c. 1870
- Built by: Peterson, John N.
- Architectural style: Greek Revival, Folk Victorian
- NRHP reference No.: 90001859
- Added to NRHP: December 6, 1990

John N. Peterson Farm is a historic home, farm, and national historic district located near Poplar, Mitchell County, North Carolina. The farmhouse was built about 1870, and is a two-story, three-bay, single pile I-house with vernacular folk Victorian sawn detailing. The front facade features a double-tier, semi-engaged, broken-slope, shed-roofed front porch. Other contributing resources are a barn dated to the second half of the 19th century and the agricultural landscape.

It was added to the National Register of Historic Places in 1990.
