= Peter Peterson Farmstead =

- U.S. National Register of Historic Places
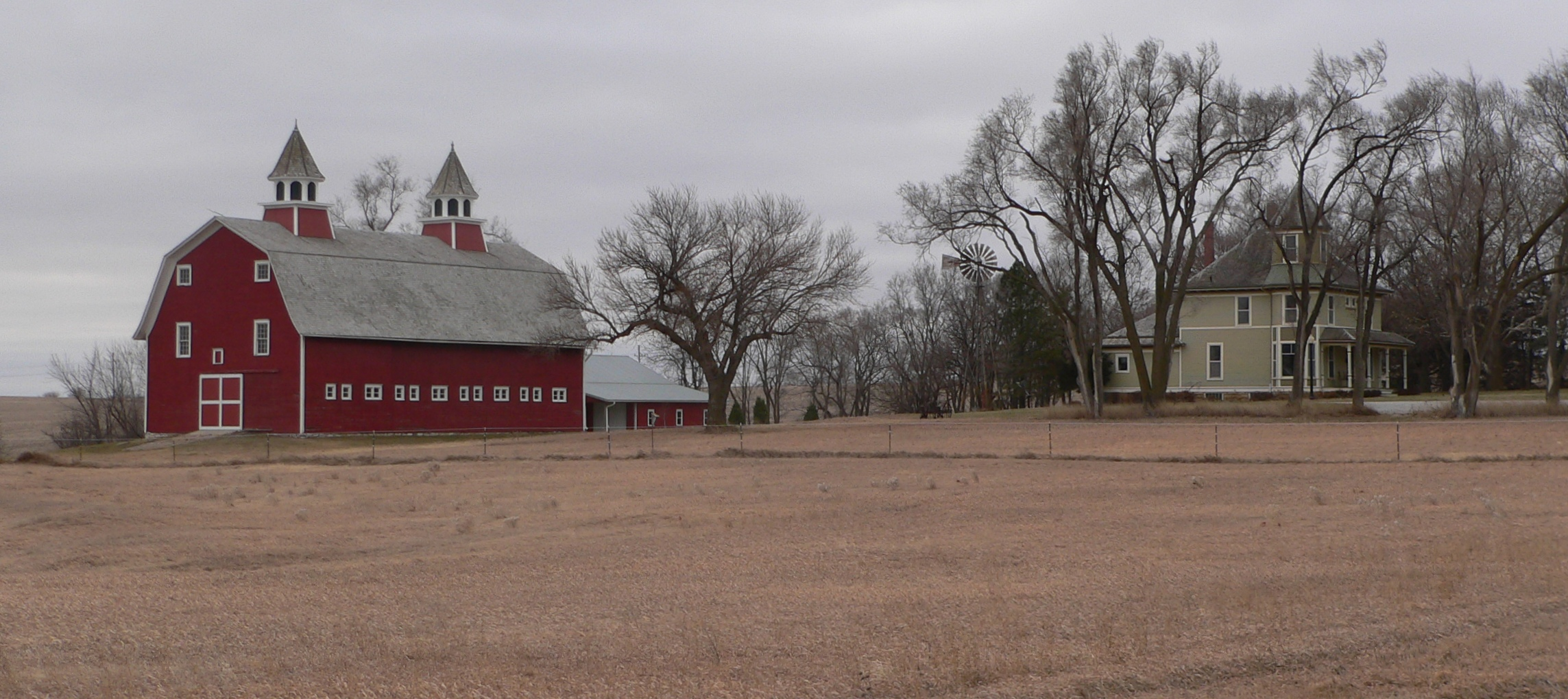
- Nearest city: Waverly, Nebraska
- Built: 1893
- Architectural style: Queen Anne
- NRHP reference No.: 80002456
- Added to NRHP: February 11, 1980

Peter Peterson Farmstead, also known as Emel Peterson Farmstead, near Waverly, Nebraska, United States, dates from 1893. It was listed on the National Register of Historic Places in 1980.

It has a Queen Anne style farmhouse with a tower, and a large barn with two octagonal cupolas. It was the farmstead of Swedish immigrants Peter and Christina Peterson.

Swedes first immigrated to the Lincoln area in 1865–71, forming what became the Swedeburg settlement. Peter Peterson, born in 1838 in Småland, Sweden, immigrated in 1868. He married Christina in 1872 and they moved to the farmstead in 1879.

The property was described in its NRHP nomination as "a significant and well-preserved example of Late Victorian architecture somewhat unique in rural Nebraska architecture and specifically important to the local Swedish agricultural community."
