= Oskar Wasastjerna =

Finnish soldier, civil servant, genealogist, historian and author

- Born: Jakob Frans Oskar Wasastjerna; 15 October 1819; Vähäkyrö, Grand Duchy of Finland, Russian Empire
- Died: 21 February 1889 (aged 69); Porvoo, Grand Duchy of Finland, Russian Empire
- Occupations: Soldier; civil servant; genealogist; historian; writer
- Spouse(s): Johanna Beata Nordenborg (died) Maria Margaretha Mether (died)
- Children: 5, including Karl Wasastjerna
- Relatives: Selim Osvald Wasastjerna (cousin); Evert Wasastjerna (cousin); Jakob Viktor Wasastjerna (cousin); Alexander Wasastjerna (cousin); Gustaf Adolf Wasastjerna (uncle); Abraham Wasastjerna (grandfather)
- Family: Wasastjerna family

Jakob Frans Oskar Wasastjerna (1819–1889), known as Oskar Wasastjerna, was a Finnish soldier, civil servant, genealogist, historian, writer and member of the Wasastjerna family.

== Biography ==
Jakob Frans Oskar Wasastjerna was born on 15 October 1819 in Vähäkyrö (present-day, Vaasa) to Frans Didrik Wasastjerna and Hedvig Elisabet Banger.

In 1859, Wasastjerna was the district manager of the Eastern Customs District of Finland. In 1867, Wasastjerna was a customs officer of Porvoo.

== Personal life ==
Wasastjerna was married to Johanna Beata Nordenborg and Maria Margaretha Mether. Wasastjerna had five children, including Karl Oskar Wasastjerna (1853–1923) a captain, author and member of the Diet of Finland. On 21 February 1889, Wasastjerna died aged 69 in Porvoo.

== Publications ==
- Tull-taxa för Storfurstendömet Finland å såväl import- som export-artiklar (1863)
- Ättar-taflor öfver den på Finlands riddarhus introducerade adeln (1880)
- Lifgardets finska skarpskyttebataljons officerare och civile tjenstemän (1887)
