= Max Petersen House =

Historic house in Iowa, United States

- U.S. National Register of Historic Places
- U.S. Historic district – Contributing property
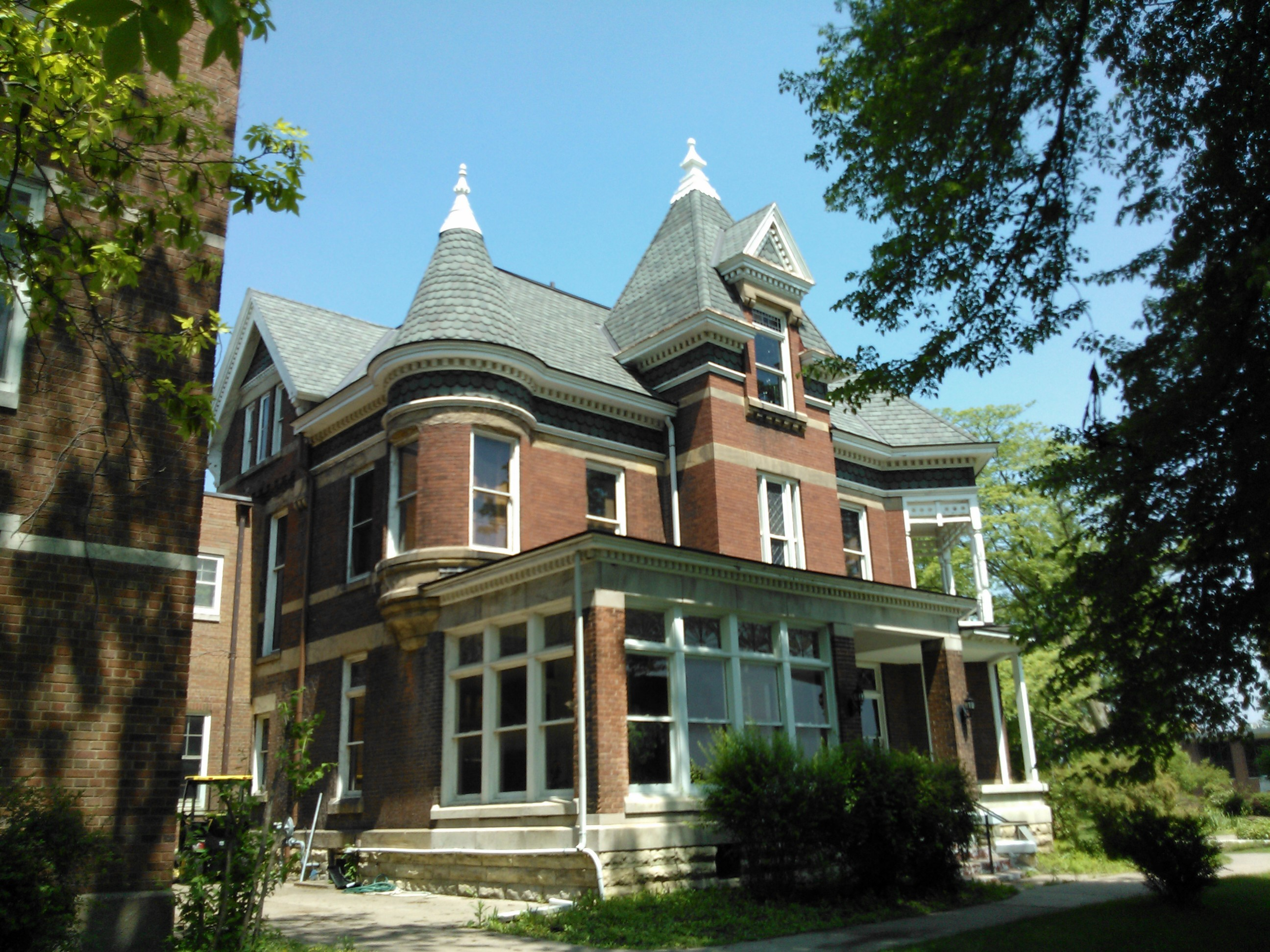

- Location within Iowa Location within the United States
- Location: 1607 W. 12th St. Davenport, Iowa
- Coordinates: 41°31′50″N 90°35′57″W
- Area: less than one acre
- Built: 1888
- Architect: Frederick G. Clausen
- Architectural style: Queen Anne
- Part of: Marycrest College Historic District (ID04000341)
- NRHP reference No.: 79000942
- Added to NRHP: December 25, 1979

The Max Petersen House, also known as the Petersen Mansion, is a historic building located on the west side of Davenport, Iowa, United States. It has been individually listed on the National Register of Historic Places since 1979. In 2004 it was included as a contributing property in the Marycrest College Historic District.

== History ==
Max Petersen was the son of J.H.C. Petersen, who was an immigrant from the Duchy of Schleswig, which was then in the Kingdom of Denmark. He eventually established a retail store in Davenport. His sons entered business with him and they took over the business in 1892. The business continues to exist as the Von Maur department store. Max was the oldest of the three brothers, and he had Davenport architect Frederick G. Clausen design a Queen Anne style home for his family in 1888.

Bishop Henry Rohlman of the Catholic Diocese of Davenport commissioned the Rev. Thomas V. Lawlor from St. Ambrose College to look for property to start a college for women. In 1937 he acquired the property, which was then called Clifton Hill, for $50,000. The donors for the project included members of the Petersen family. The property included the house and 7.5-acre (3.0 ha). Marycrest College was established on the property in 1939, and the Petersen home initially became the sister's residence. Over the years it served other functions for the college. After the college was disbanded in 2002 it was acquired by Chris Ales and became part of the Marycrest Senior Campus.

== Architecture ==
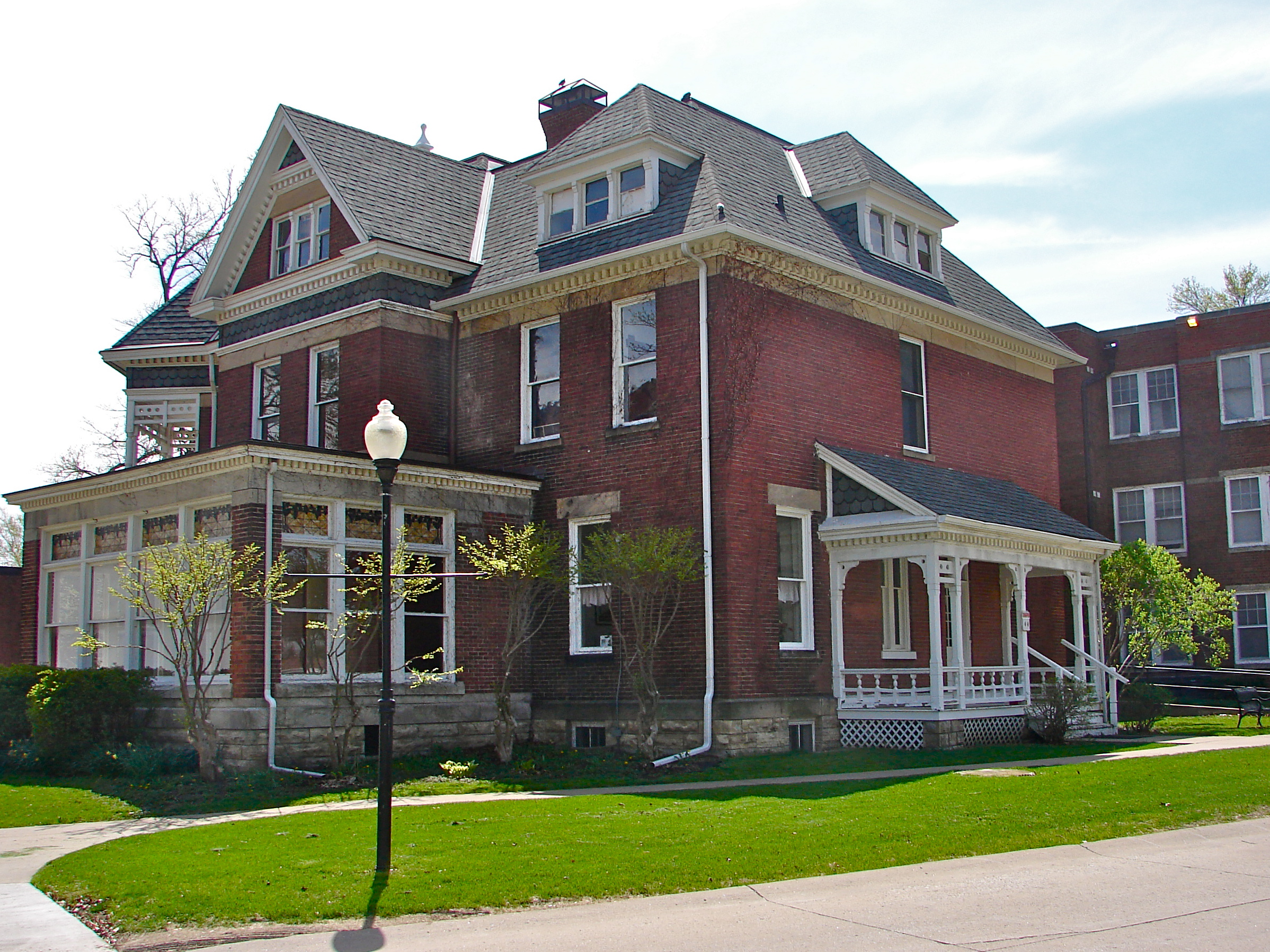
Rear view of the house

The 2½-story house is basically square in shape, however, it is narrower and a little lower in the back. The brick structure rests on a rock-faced stone foundation. It is capped by a high hip roof. Both the east and west sides of the house feature projecting gable ends. A turret with a conical roof is located on the southwest corner of the main façade. The southeast corner features a rectangular shaped corner bay with a second floor porch and its own hipped roof. In the center is a tall projecting tower. Single story porches with flat roofs are located on the front and east sides of the house. At the roofline is a narrow cornice. Three string courses encircle the house flush with the brick surface. Decorative elements are restrained. They are mainly found on the large dentils on the cornice, the turned Eastlake post and punched frieze on the second story porch, and a wall dormer on the central tower that has an elaborate projecting sill and triangular pediment.
