= Petersen House (Sweden) =

House in Stockholm, Sweden

Coordinates: 59.3244°N 18.0673°E

- Petersenska huset
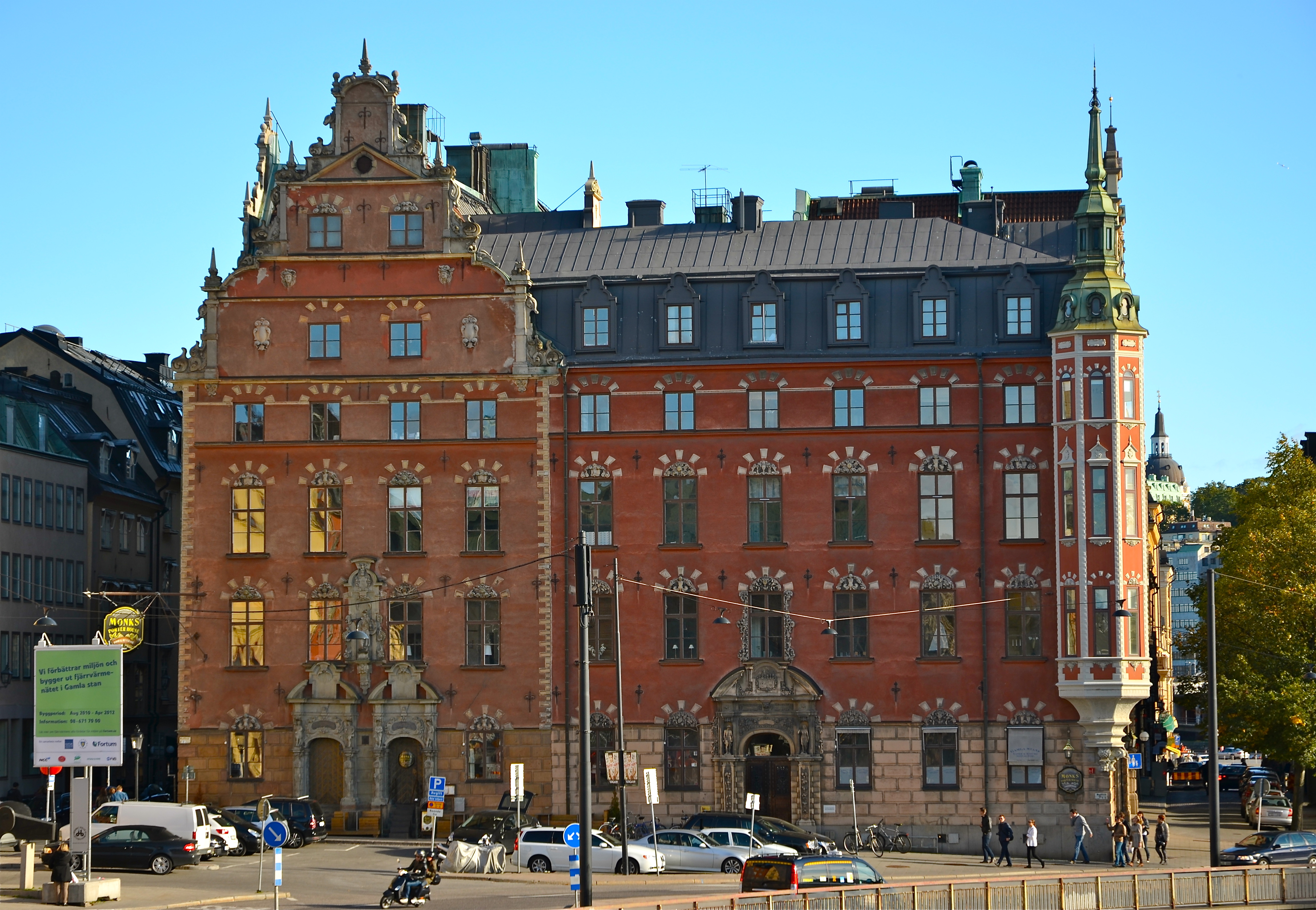
- Interactive map of the Petersen House area
- Former names: Piper Palace

General information
- Location: Gamla stan, Stockholm, Sweden
- Completed: 1659

Design and construction
- Architect: Christian Julius Döteber

The Petersen House (Swedish: Petersenska huset) is a building in Stockholm, Sweden, erected between 1645 and 1659 from construction drawings by Christian Julius Döteber, and built in the Dutch Baroque architectural style.

== See also ==
- Herman Petersen
- List of castles in Sweden

== Sources ==
- Wåhlin, Karl; Rinman, Sven (1896). Ord och bild (in Swedish). P.A. Norstedt & Söner – via Google Books.
