= Pieters =

Pieters is a Dutch surname, equivalent to Peters. It can refer to:

- Amy Pieters (born 1991), Dutch racing cyclist
- Andries Jan Pieters (1916–1952), Dutch collaborator with Nazis who was executed for war crimes
- Brandon Pieters (born 1976), South African professional golfer
- Bruno Pieters, Belgian fashion designer
- Carle M. Pieters (born 1943), American planetary scientist
- Cindy Pieters (born 1976), Belgian racing cyclist
- Danny Pieters (born 1956), Belgian politician
- Deane Pieters (born 1968), Australian swimmer
- Dewald Pieters (born 1990), South African rugby player
- Eddy Pieters Graafland (1934–2020), Dutch footballer
- Erik Pieters (born 1988) Dutch footballer
- Fabio Pieters (born 1978), Argentine footballer
- Geertje Pieters (1636–1712), Dutch flower painter
- Godfried Pieters (born 1936), Dutch sculptor
- Guido Pieters (born 1948), Dutch film director
- Jean Pieters (born 1962), Dutch biochemist
- Josh Pieters, South African YouTuber
- Kim Pieters (born 1959), New Zealand painter, musician and video artist
- Peter Pieters (born 1962), Dutch racing cyclist
- Sven Pieters (born 1976), Belgian sprint hurdler

== See also ==
- 3713 Pieters
