= Conrad Victor Ankarcrona =

Conrad Ankarcrona
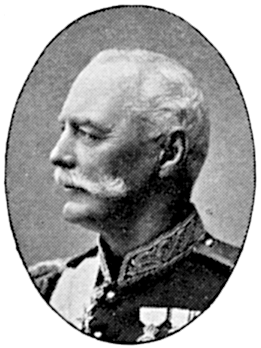
- Photograph of Ankarcrona rom Svenskt Porträttgalleri II (1899).
- Born: Conrad Victor Ankarcrona; December 15, 1823; Runsa, Stockholm, Sweden
- Died: October 9, 1912 (aged 88); Royal Chapel, Stockholm, Sweden
- Burial place: Norra Begravningsplatsen, Stockholm, Sweden
- Education: Military Academy Karlberg, Karlberg, Sweden

Conrad Victor Ankarcrona (1823–1912) was a Grand Master of the Court of the King of Sweden.

== Biography ==
Ankarcrona was born on 15 December 1823, to Theodor Wilhelm Ankarcrona and Charlotte Sture in Runsa, Sweden. Ankarcrona enrolled as a cadet at the Military Academy Karlberg in 1837, and at the age of 23, he was commissioned as a second lieutenant in the Swedish Navy after his examination on 27 March 1846. As a second lieutenant, he served in the First Schleswig War aboard the ship of the line Skjold and the gunboat Eider. He resigned as early as 1853 with permission to remain in service without pay. In the following years, he was promoted to first lieutenant, and in 1855 he resigned permanently from the Navy.

He became a chamberlain in 1865 and Juryman of Hölebo Hundred in 1871, but his career in the court wouldn't begin until after the coronation of Oscar II in 1872. Upon his accession to the throne, King Oscar appointed Ankarcrona as his cabinet chamberlain. Ankarcrona always stayed out of politics. He was King Oscar II's personal friend and wanted to be nothing else; in 1883, the King appointed him Huntsman-Major (Överhovjägmästare). Ankarcrona was appointed Steward of Stockholm Palace in 1889. Due to old age he was discharged from the position as steward on 12 December 1911, and later died in the Royal Chapel on 9 October 1912 and was buried at Norra Begravningsplatsen outside Stockholm.

== Family ==
Ankarcrona was the son of Gentleman of the Bedchamber Theodor Wilhelm Ankarcrona and Baroness Charlotte Sture; on his mother's side, he descended from one of Sweden's oldest noble families. He was the brother of Alexis Ankarcrona and Henric Ankarcrona.

In 1851, Victor Ankarcrona married his cousin, Countess Ebba Charlotta Bielke (1828–1911), daughter of Gentleman of the Bedchamber Nils Bielke (1792–1845) and Baroness Ebba Florentine Sture. Through this marriage, he became a co-owner of the estates Tureholm and Örboholm in Södermanland. Victor Ankarcrona and Ebba Charlotta Bielke were the parents of Anna Ebba Charlotta Ankarcrona (1852–1862), Ebba Eva Vilhelmina Ankarcrona (born 1854), who later married Baron Johan Gripenstedt, a senior chamberlain, Nils Viktor Teodor Ankarcrona (1856–1857), Hunstman-Major Carl Gustaf Oskar Ankarcrona (born 1857), Charlotta Sofia Ankarcrona (born 1859), who was married to County Governor Gustaf Tornérhjelm of Malmöhus County, Commander Nils Sten Teodor Ankarcrona (born 1864), Anna Ida Paulina Ankarcrona (born 1868), who was married to Lieutenant Baron Fredrik Oskar af Ugglas, and Eva Viktoria Ankarcrona (born 1871), who was married to Chamberlain Baron Gustaf Fredrik Nils Åkerhielm af Margretelund.

== Awards ==
=== Swedish Awards ===
- (Sweden) Knight and Commander of the Orders of His Majesty the King's Orden (Order of the Seraphim), 18 September 1897.
- (Sweden) King Oscar II and Queen Sofia's Golden Wedding Medal, 1907.
- (Sweden) King Oscar II's Jubilee Commemorative Medal, 1897.
- (Sweden) Crown Prince Gustaf V and Crown Princess Victoria's Silver Wedding Medal, 1906.
- (Sweden) 1st Class Commander of the Order of the Polar Star, 9 April 1881.
- (Sweden) Knight of the Order of the Polar Star, 1 December 1876.
- (Sweden) Grand Cross Commander of the Order of Vasa, 1 December 1886.
- (Sweden) Knight of the Order of Vasa, 3 May 1868.

=== International Awards ===
- (Denmark) Knight of the Order of the Elephant, 11 September 1906.
- (Denmark) Grand Cross of the Order of the Dannebrog, 17 September 1884.
- (Denmark) 1st Class Commander of the Order of the Dannebrog, 5 June 1875.
- (Denmark) Cross of Honour of the Order of the Dannebrog, 1909 at the latest.
- (France) Grand Cross of the Legion of Honour, 1902.
- (Kingdom of Prussia) Grand Cross of the Order of the Red Eagle, 29 September 1893.
- (Norway) 1st Class Commander of the Order of St. Olav, 6 June 1882.
- (Norway) Knight of the Order of St. Olav, 21 July 1881.
- (Russia) Knight of the Order of the White Eagle, 1909 at the latest.
- (Russia) 1st Class Knight of the Order of Saint Stanislaus, 1879.
- Grand Officer of the Order of the Star of Romania, 1909 at the latest.
- (Ottoman Empire) First Class of the Order of Osmanieh, 1 November 1898.
