= Prince's Mansion =

Mansion in Copenhagen, Denmark

The Prince's Mansion
- Prinsens Palæ
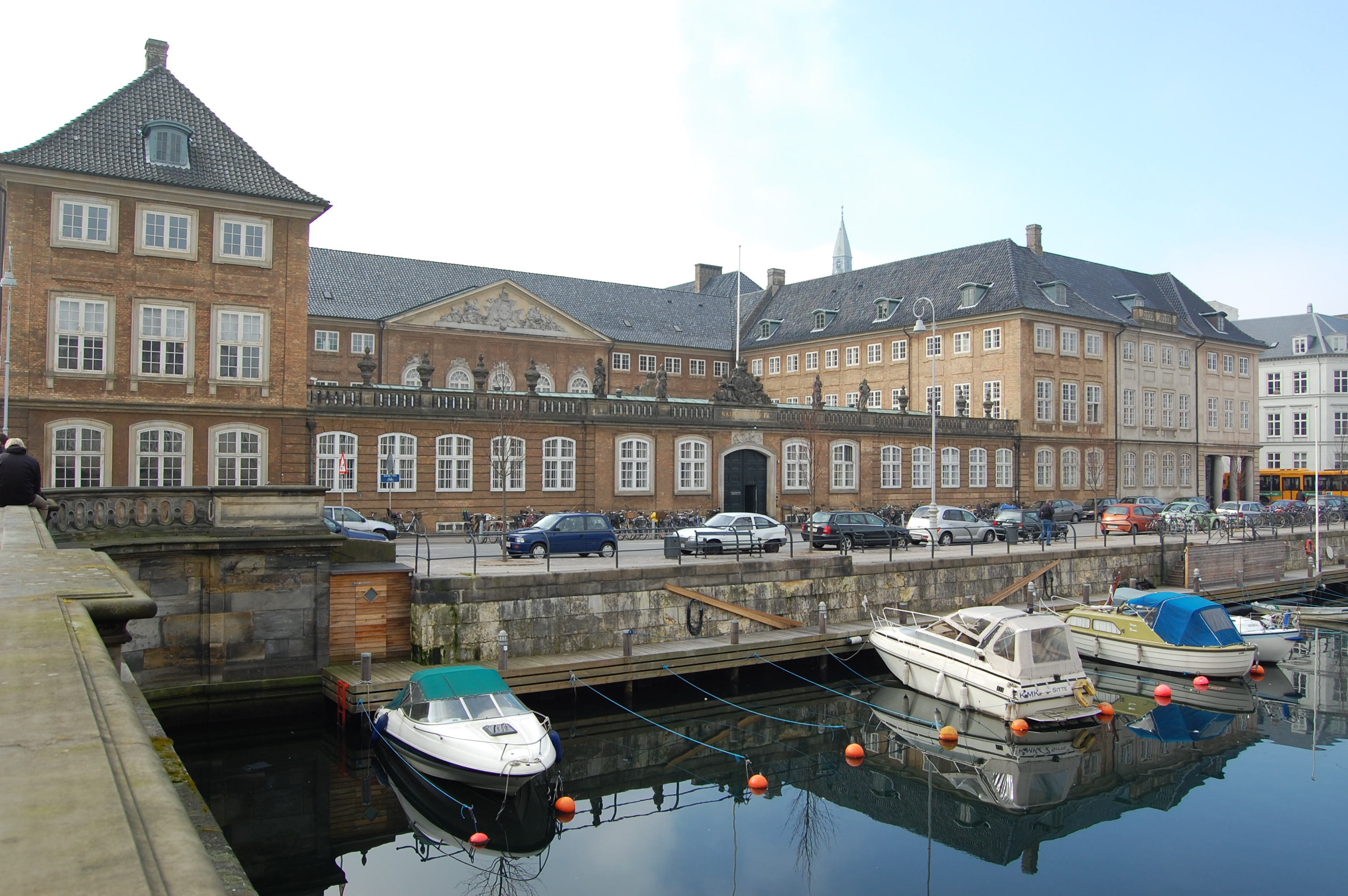
- The building seen from across Frederiksholms Kanal
- Interactive map of the The Prince's Mansion area

General information
- Architectural style: Rococo
- Location: Copenhagen, Denmark, Denmark
- Coordinates: 55°40′29″N 12°34′29″E
- Construction started: 1743
- Completed: 1744
- Client: Crown Prince Frederick (V).

Design and construction
- Architect: Niels Eigtved

The Prince's Mansion is a palatial Rococo-style mansion located at Frederiksholms Kanal in central Copenhagen, Denmark. It used to serve as the official residence of the Crown Prince of Denmark but now houses the National Museum of Denmark.

== History ==
=== The Michelbecker House ===
The original house was built in 1684 by Gysbert Wigand Michelbecker. Born in Marburg, he had settled in Copenhagen in 1657 and built a successful career as a merchant and ship owner. In 1685 the first reformed church in Copenhagen opened in his house.

Michelbecker died in 1692 and in 1707 his house was taken over by his son-in-law Wilhelm Edinger. In 1716 it was put at the disposal of Tsar Peter the Great during his visit to Copenhagen.

=== A princely residence ===
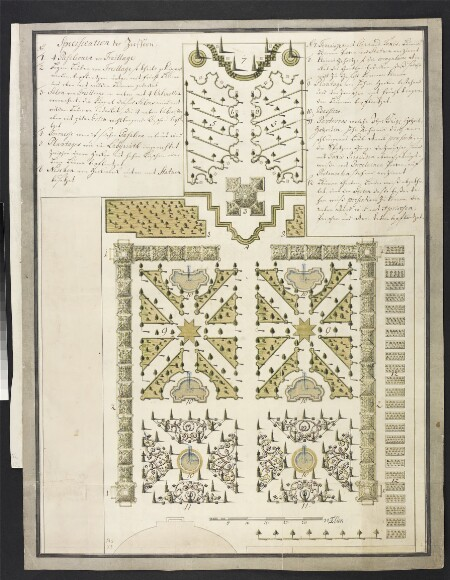
Krieger's plan of the garden from 1728

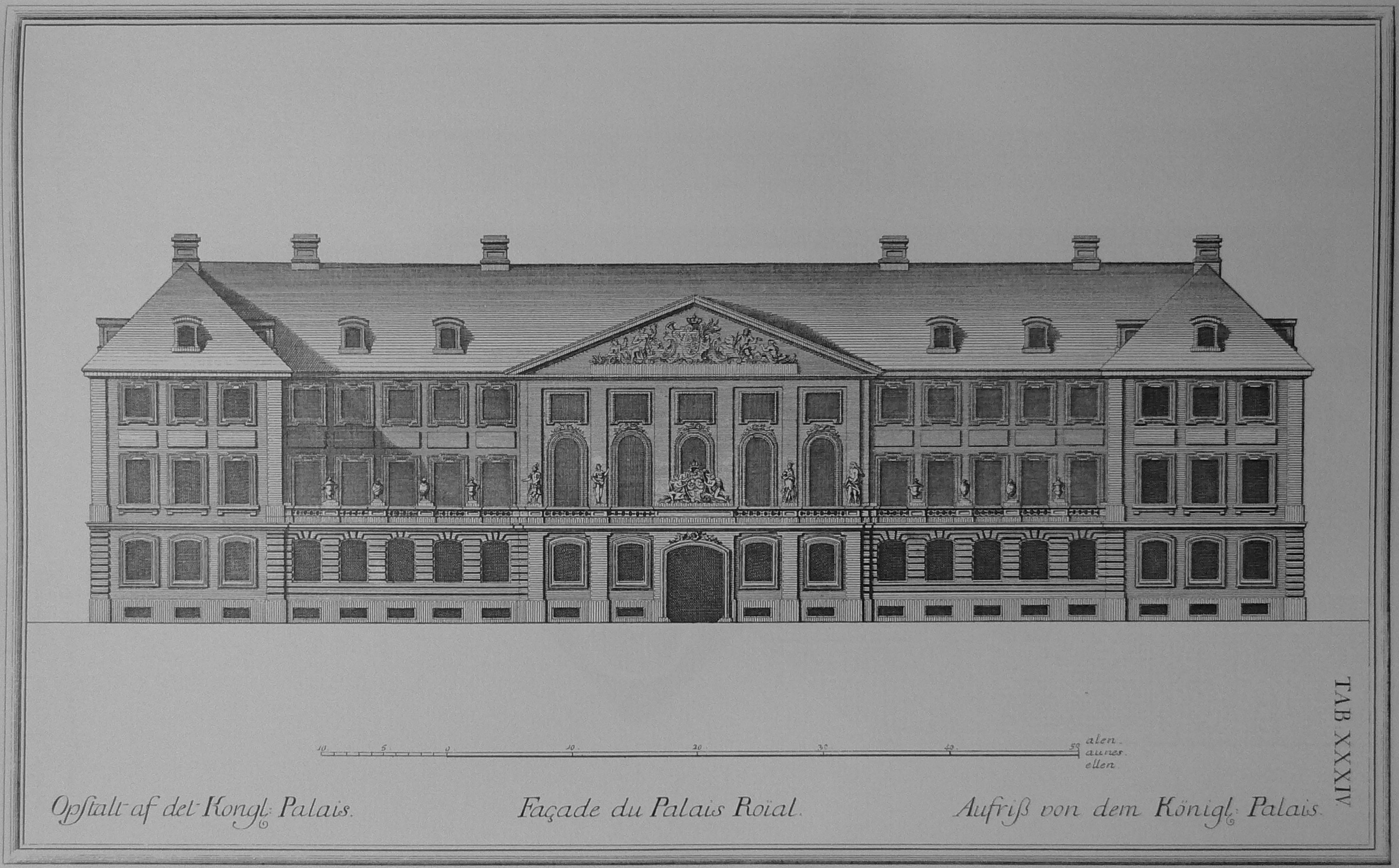
An elevation of the print mansion from Lauritz de Thurah's Den Danske Vitruvius published in 1746

In 1725 Edinger sold the house to King Frederick IV who transformed it into a residence for Crown Prince Christian (VI) with the assistance of the architect Johan Cornelius Krieger.

After King Christian VI's ascent to the throne, the Prince's Mansion was taken over by Crown Prince Frederick (V). He completely altered the building from 1743 to 1744 with the assistance of Royal Master Builder Niels Eigtved. In 1757 Lauritz de Thurah, Eigtved's successor as Court Architect, carried out a minor expansion of the complex on the corner of Frederiksholms Kanal and Stormgade.

=== Other residents ===
Later in the century the royal family discontinued their use of the property and instead it came into use for other purposes, mostly as a residence for artists, courtiers and other peers with close ties to the court.

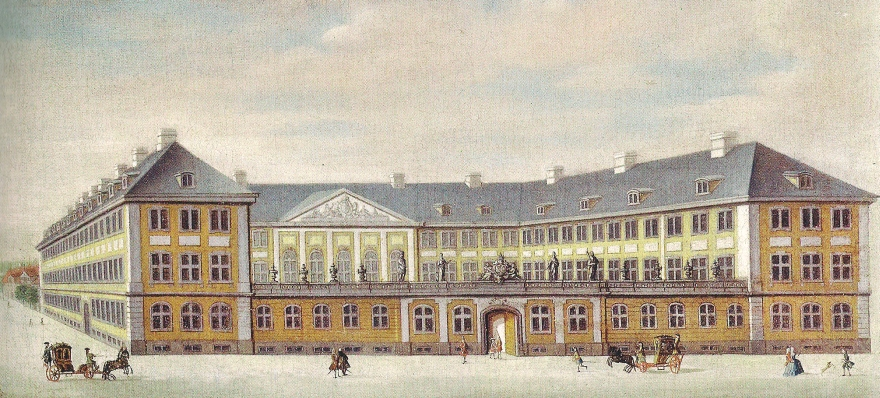
The Prince's Mansion in 1757

For a while, the painters Jens Juel and Nikolaj Abraham Abildgaard both had their studios in the building. The latter also had his home there from 1779 until 1787, and so did Court Painter Vigilius Eriksen, who lived there from 1774 until 1782. Geographer and explorer Carsten Niebuhr, who had returned to Copenhagen as the only surviving member of the Danish Arabia Expedition in 1768, lived there from 1773 until 1778 when he accepted a position in the civil service of Danish Holstein. Among the statesmen who lived there were Foreign Minister Adolph Sigfried von der Osten and Ove Høegh-Guldberg who became de facto prime minister after Struense's fall and lived there until his own fall as a result of the 1784 coup d'état.

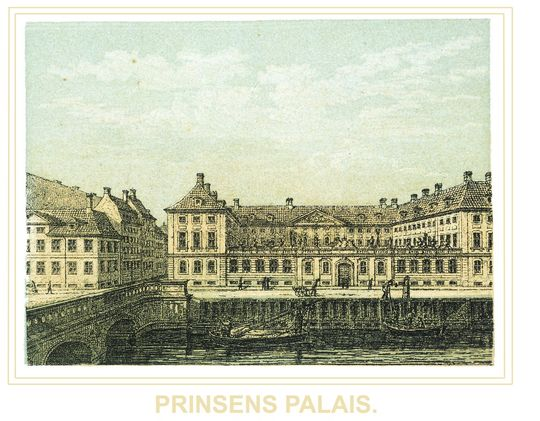
The Prince´s Mansion in c. 1800

After the turn of the century, the residents included Royal Master Builder Christian Frederik Hansen who lived there from 1805 until 1834 while working on such projects as the construction of the new Copenhagen City Hall and the rebuilding of the Church of Our Lady and Christiansborg Palace. Gerhard Christoph von Krogh, the military officer who had led the Danish troops in the Battle of Isted, was a resident from 1817 until 1853.

=== A temporary home for the Supreme Court ===
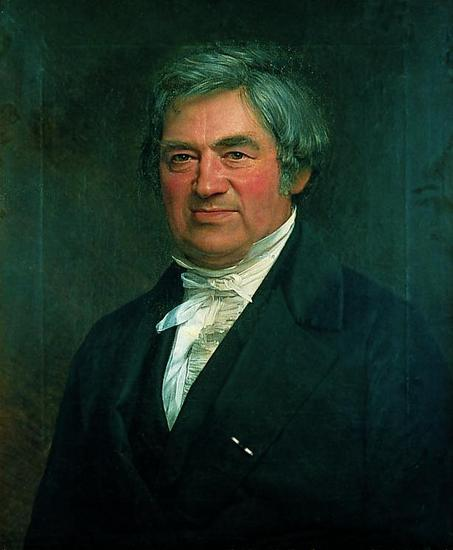
Christian Jürgensen Thomsen painted by Johan Vilhelm Gertner in 1849

The fire of the first Christiansborg in 1794 did not only leave the royal family but also the Supreme Court of Denmark homeless and it found a new home at the Prince's Mansion. In 1830 it was given a new Assembly Hall at the second Christiansborg Palace but the daily administration remained at the mansion until 1864.

=== State ownership ===
After the adoption of the new Constitution in 1849, the Prince's Mansion was ceded to the Danish State. The building then came to serve as a "home for the National Collections". These included the Museum of Ethnology which opened in 1849, the Royal Cabinet of Coins and Medals and the Museum of Nordic Antiquities. The latter two were headed by the historian Christian Jürgensen Thomsen who also resided in the building from 1851 until his death in 1865. The Museum of Nordic Antiquities eventually developed into the National Museum which opened in the Prince's Mansion in 1892.

== Architecture ==
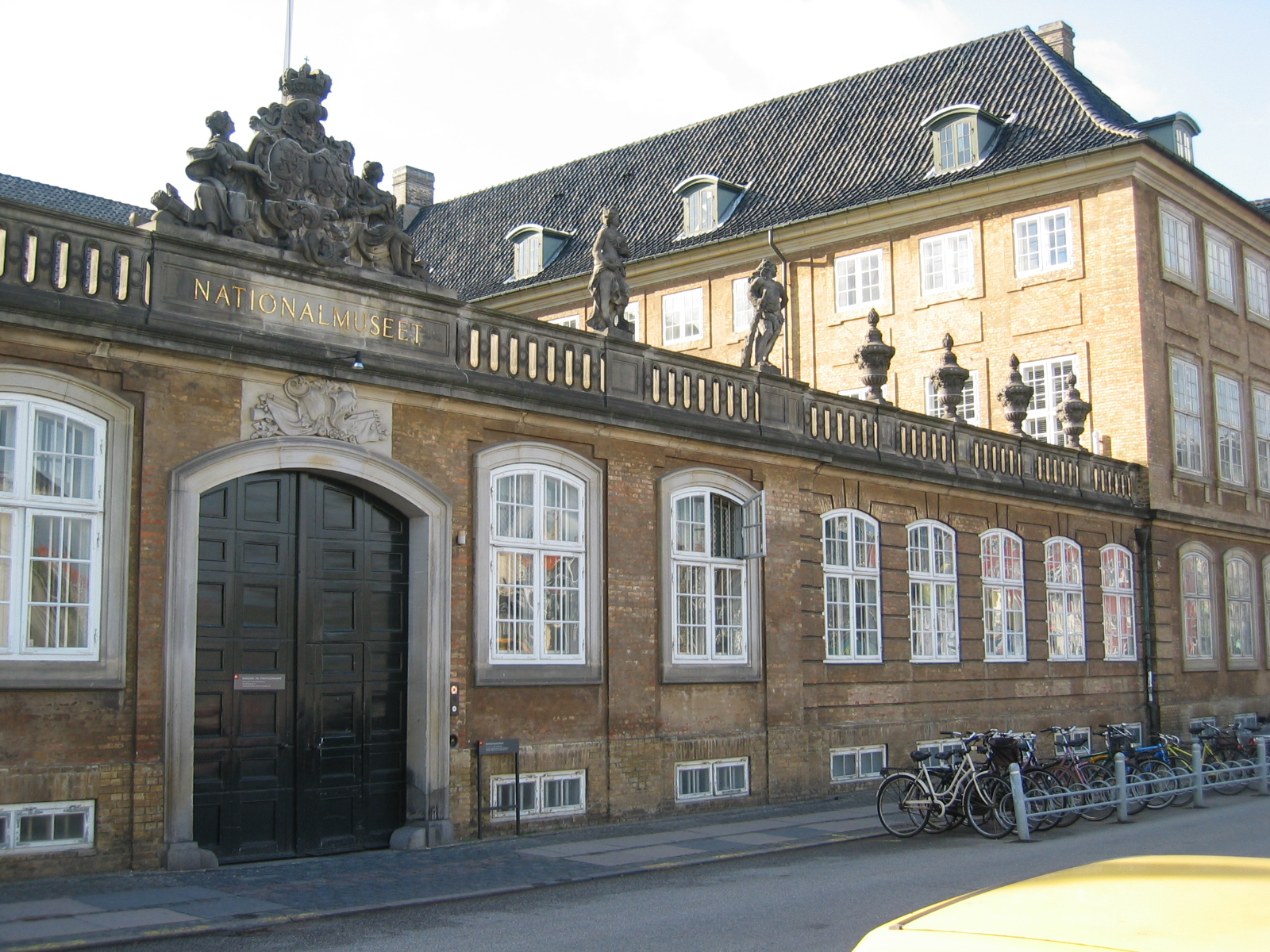
The gallery facing Frederiksholms Kanal

The Prince's Mansion is one of the earliest Rococo buildings in Copenhagen. It has three wings with a courtyard closed to Frederiksholms Kanal by a single-story gallery with an entrance gate in the middle. The gallery is topped by a balustrade with vases and statues. The statues together with window decorations on the garden side were saved from Krieger's building from 1726.

The original symmetry of Eigtved's complex has been changed by the later alterations of other architects which has increased the north wing to ten bays while the south wing still only consists of three bays.

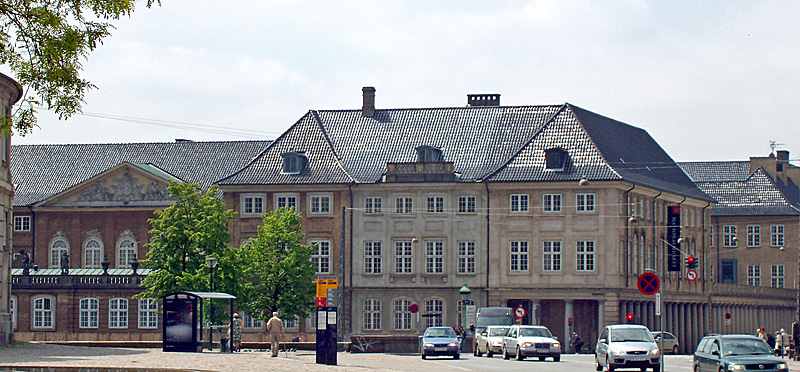
The expansion with the colonnade visible to the right

Mogens Clemmensen and Arne Nystrøm expanded the museum from 1929 to 1938, adding a large new four-winged building on the rear of the original mansion as well as a more narrow connecting wing between the new and old buildings which create a courtyard space open toward Ny Vestergade. On the opposite (Stormgade) side, they created a colonnade along the entire length of the complex, from Vester Voldgade to Frederiksholms Kanal. It has 38 columns of granite from the island of Bornholm.

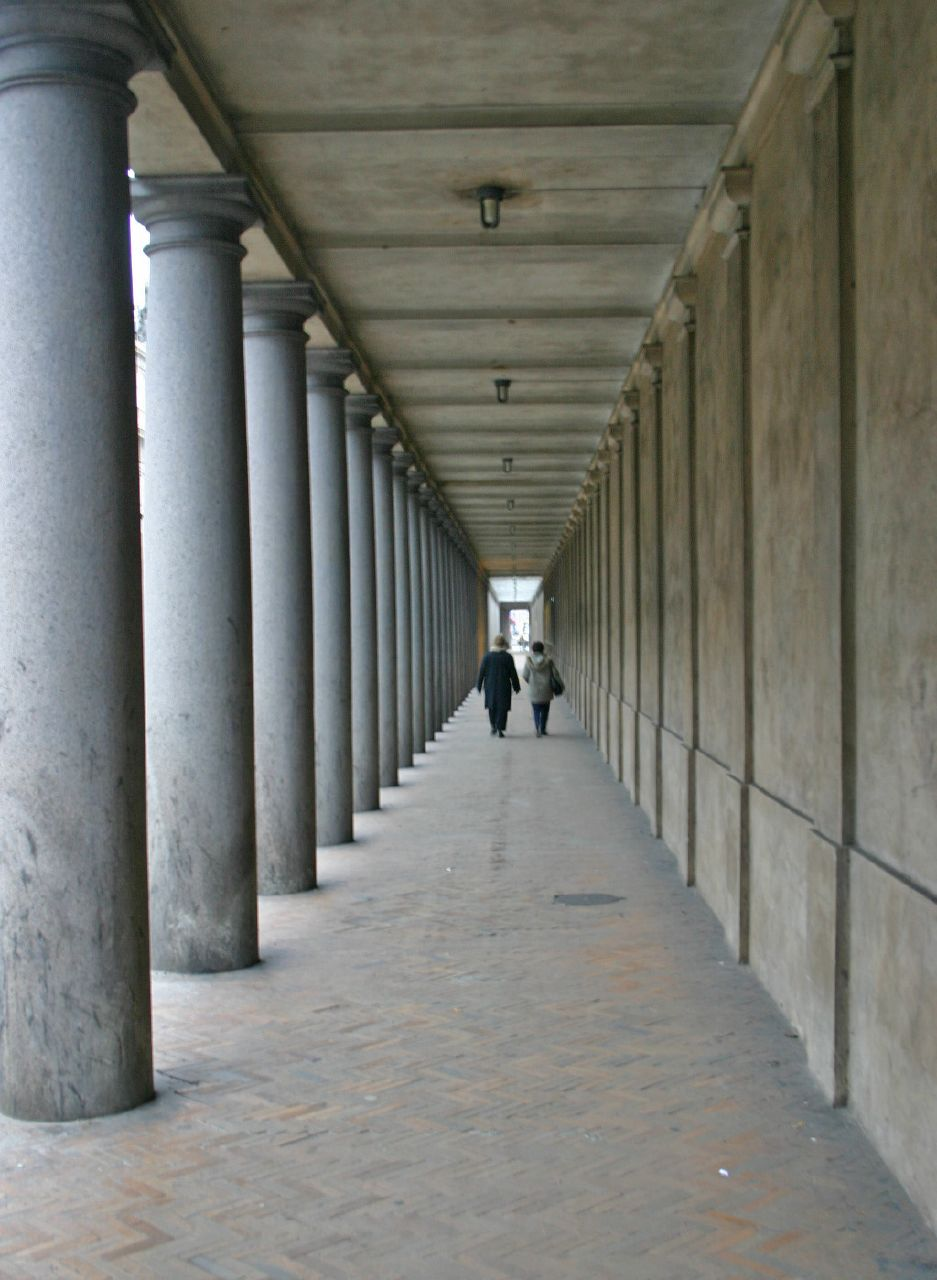
The colonnade on Stormgade

The latest alterations of the building took place in 1992 to the design of Gehrdt Bornebusch. He covered the interior courtyard of the connecting wing with a glass roof, transforming it into a central lobby entered through the museum's new main entrance located in the recessed section of the facade toward Ny Vestergade.

== The Prince's Mansion today ==
The Prince's Mansion still houses the principal department of the National Museum. Facilities also include a restaurant and a cinema.

== Literature ==
- Antonsen, Inge Mejer: Prinsens Palais. Det Kongelige Palais i Kalveboderne 1-2. Nationalmuseet. 1992 (550 pages)

== See also ==
- Charlottenborg Palace
