= Nils Bielke (1792–1845) =

Count Nils Bielke (1792–1845) was a Gentleman of the Bedchamber of the King of Sweden and the head of the comital house of Bielke, counts of Salsta and Holy Roman Counts of Torgelow.

Born on 13 Sep 1792 at the family castle of Sturefors, eldest son of count Gustav Ture Bielke and his wife Charlotta Katarina née Hård. Died on 22 Jan 1845 at Stockholm.

== Family and children ==
He married (on 5 Aug 1827 at the Strömsta Manor, the family seat of the baronial Sture family, in Uppland) baroness Ebba Florentine Sture, and had at least one daughter, countess Ebba Charlotta Bielke (1828–1911), who married in 1851 her cousin Conrad Victor Ankarcrona (1823–1912), Grand Master of the Court of the King of Sweden and had issue.
