= Rococo architecture =

Late Baroque 18th-century architectural style

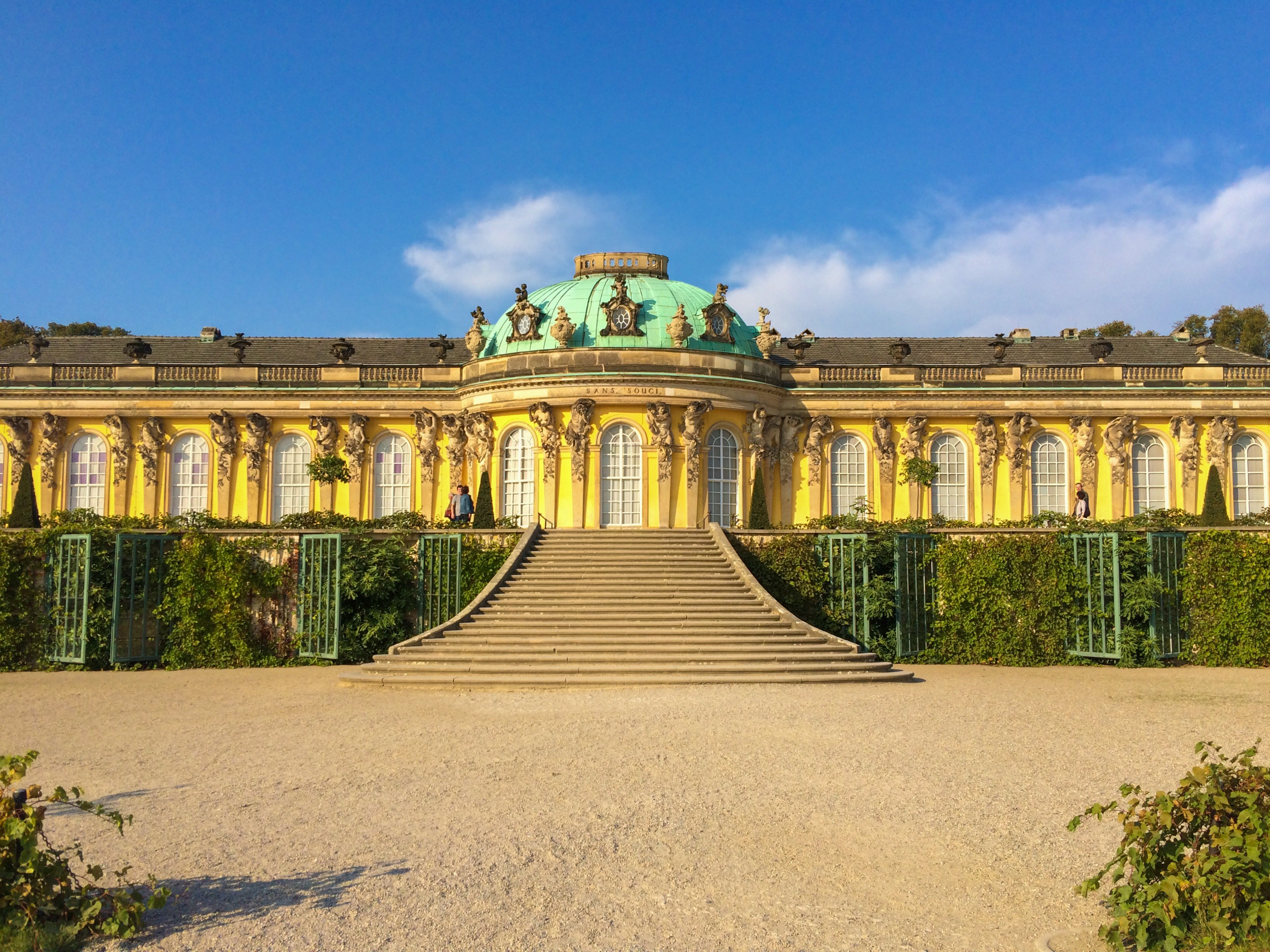
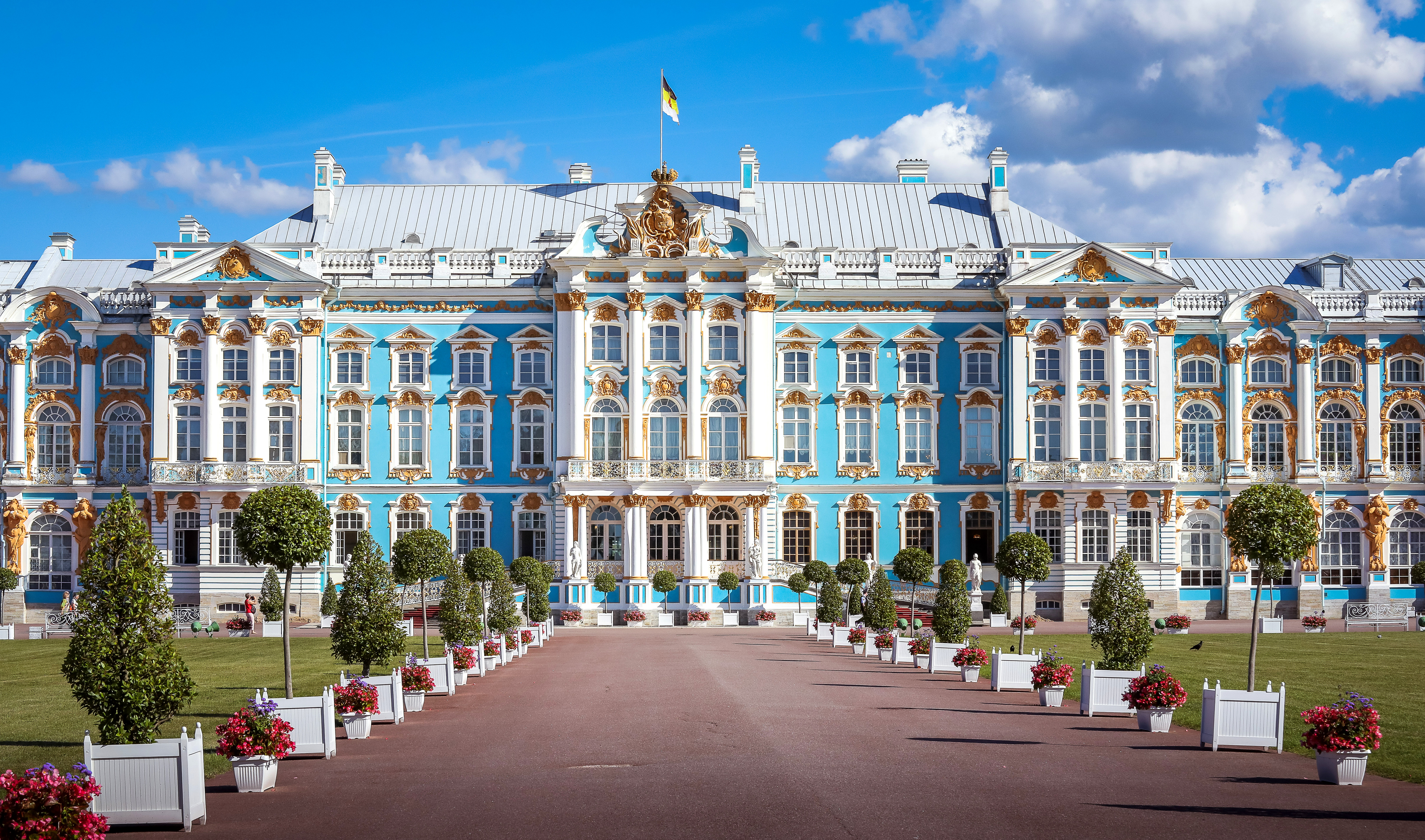
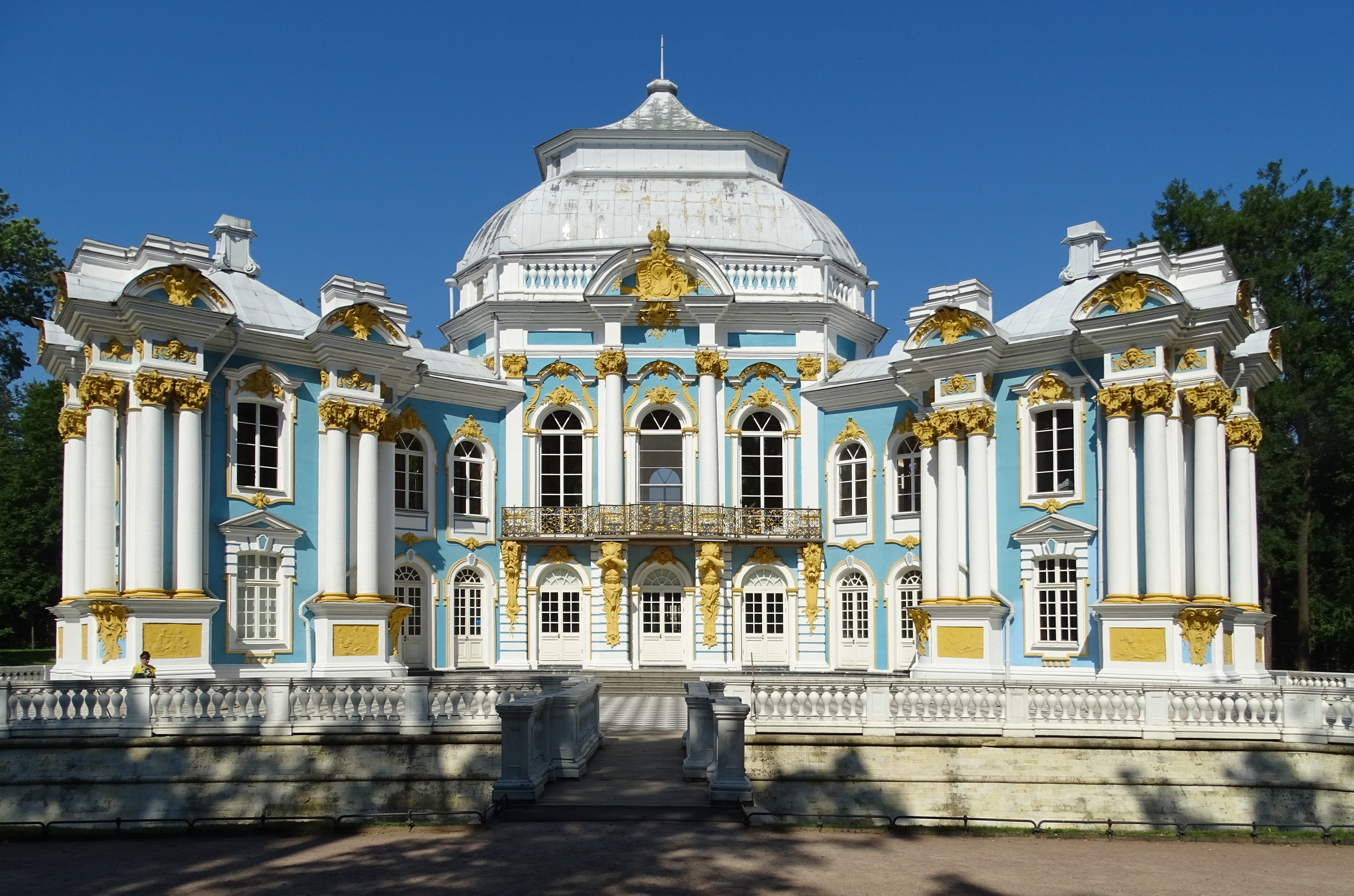
- From top to bottom: Sanssouci Palace in Germany, Catherine Palace in Russia, and Hermitage Retreat Building in Catherine Park in Russia
- Years active: 18th century
- Location: Europe

Rococo architecture, prevalent during the reign of Louis XV in France from 1715 to 1774, is an exceptionally ornamental and exuberant architectural style characterized by the use of rocaille motifs such as shells, curves, mascarons, arabesques, and other classical elements. The Rococo style abandoned the symmetry of earlier Baroque styles like façades, cornices, and pediments, and instead created a flexible and visually engaging style that maintained a level of classical regularity. Light pastel colors, including shades of blue, green, and pink, replaced the darker elements characteristic of Baroque architecture such as exposed limestone and extensive gilding.

The iconography of Rococo architecture, predominantly associated with 18-century Europe, had a considerable influence on various architectural styles globally over subsequent centuries. These styles include Dutch colonial, French colonial, Neoclassical, Greek Revival, Belle Époque, Second Empire, Victorian, Art Deco, and Art Nouveau.

Some of the largest and most well known examples of Rococo architecture include royal palaces and other grand residences, such as Nymphenburg Palace and Sanssouci Palace in Germany, along with Runsa and Salsta Palaces in Stockholm, Sweden. In Russia, notable examples include Alexander Palace, Catherine Palace, and the Winter Palace. Many have been preserved and serve as historic house museums.

== Exterior design and Andrea Palladio's Quattro Libri ==
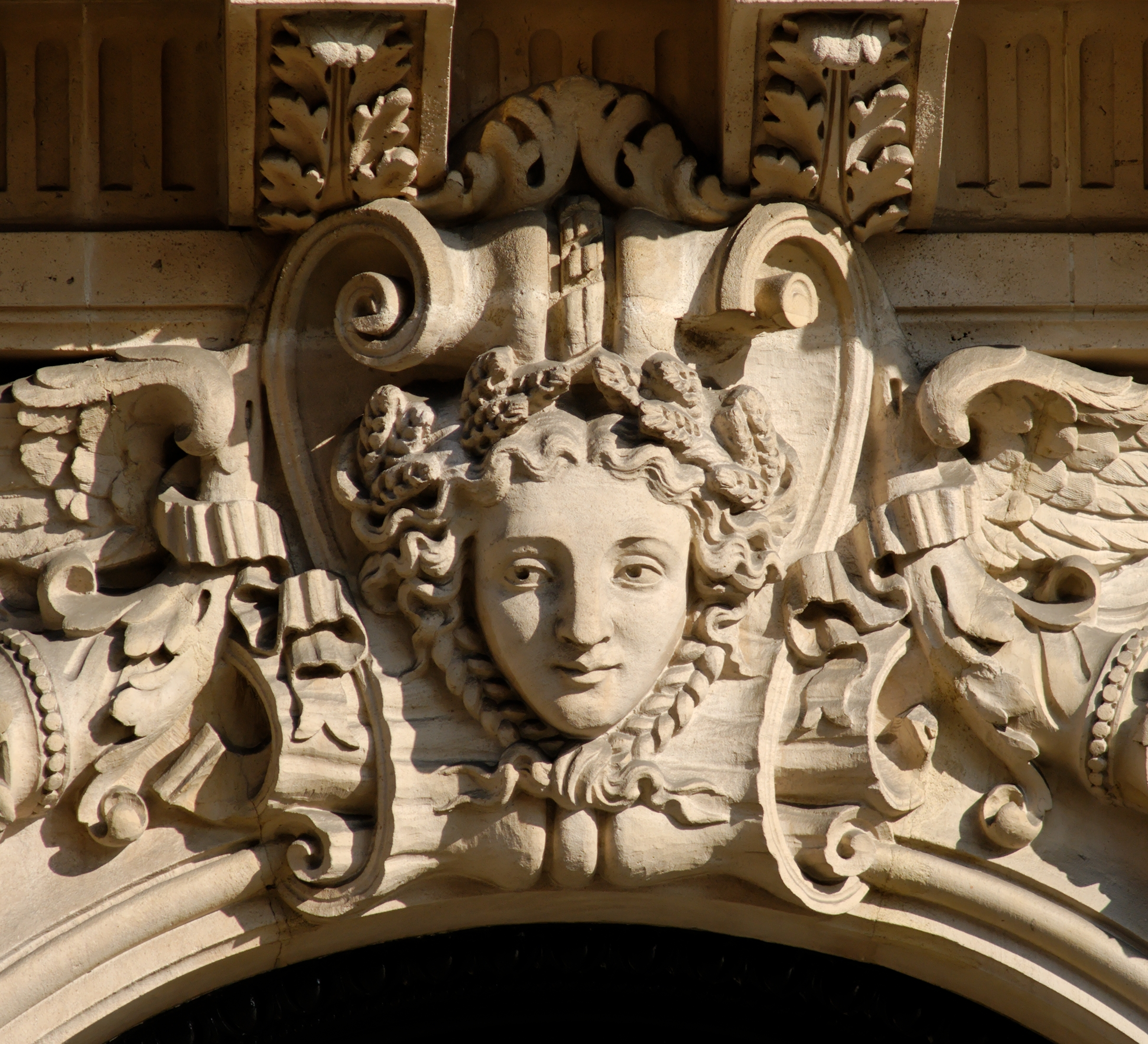
Mascaron of Avenue de l'Opéra no. 8, Paris, France

Eighteenth-century architecture was profoundly influenced by classical ideals of symmetrical design, prominently featuring elements such as columns, capitals, pediments, architraves, statuary, and other exterior ornamentation. The principles outlined in Andrea Palladio's Quattro Libri dell'Architettura (Four Books on Architecture), published in Italy in 1570, remained influential throughout the latter half of the millennium. These principles served as a foundation for various architectural styles, including Renaissance, Baroque, Rococo, Neoclassical, and Greek Revival architecture. They provided a template for room arrangement and the basic design of exterior elevations.

During the Rococo period, architects adapted these classical templates to include asymmetrical forms, whimsical curves, and bright colors, creating more dynamic and engaging designs. While some architectural historians may consider the Rococo period as a continuation of the late Baroque style, it is predominantly recognized as a distinct architectural design.

By the late 18-century, the Rococo style was increasingly viewed as an elaborate and grandiose manifestation, characterized by extravagant cartouches, flamboyant curves, and excessive gilding. As a reaction, the Neoclassical style emerged, aiming to return to the simpler, allegorical forms and motifs reminiscent of Ancient Greece and Rome. These architectural styles consistently incorporated allegorical motifs, such as acanthus leaves, cupids, putti, and figures of Greek and Roman deities, to convey an image of sophistication and moral stability. Central to many Rococo architectural friezes was the mascaron, an allegorical face that served either as a welcoming symbol or a deterrent, depending on its expression.

== Interior elements and classical allegorical motifs ==
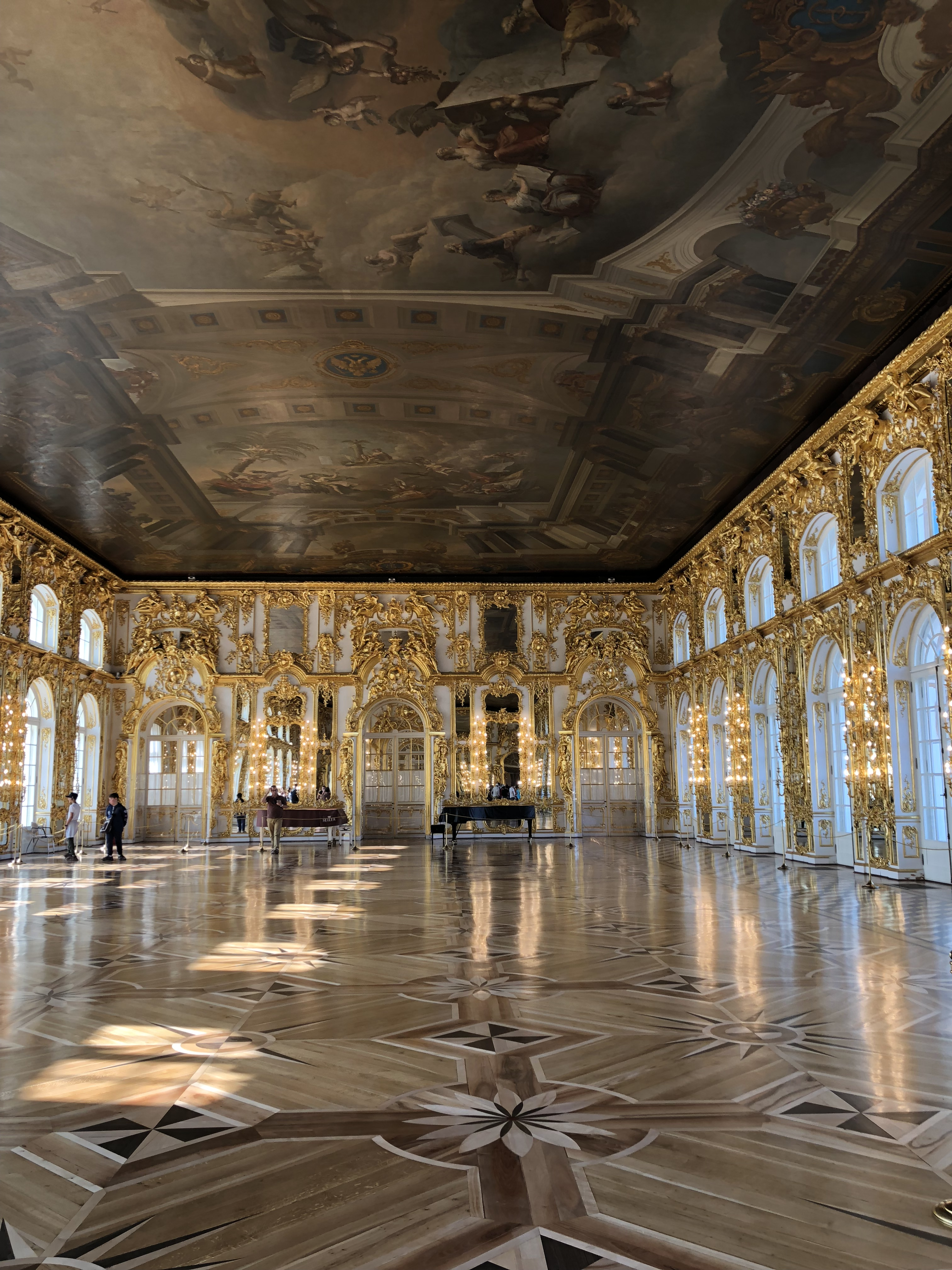
Ballroom, Francesco Rastrelli's Golden Enfilade of Rooms, Catherine Palace, Tsarskoye Selo in Russia

The interiors of Rococo buildings were intended to project an atmosphere of both intricate detail and comfort for occupants and visitors. Notable examples include the Hôtel de Soubise in France and the Catherine Palace in Russia, where the extensive use of mirrors and large windows, surrounded by gilt frames with arabesques, created spacious, bright interiors in areas such as ballrooms, antechambers, and state dining rooms. These settings were enhanced by plasterwork, water gilding, marquetry and parquet flooring, along with painted and gilded plafond ceilings.

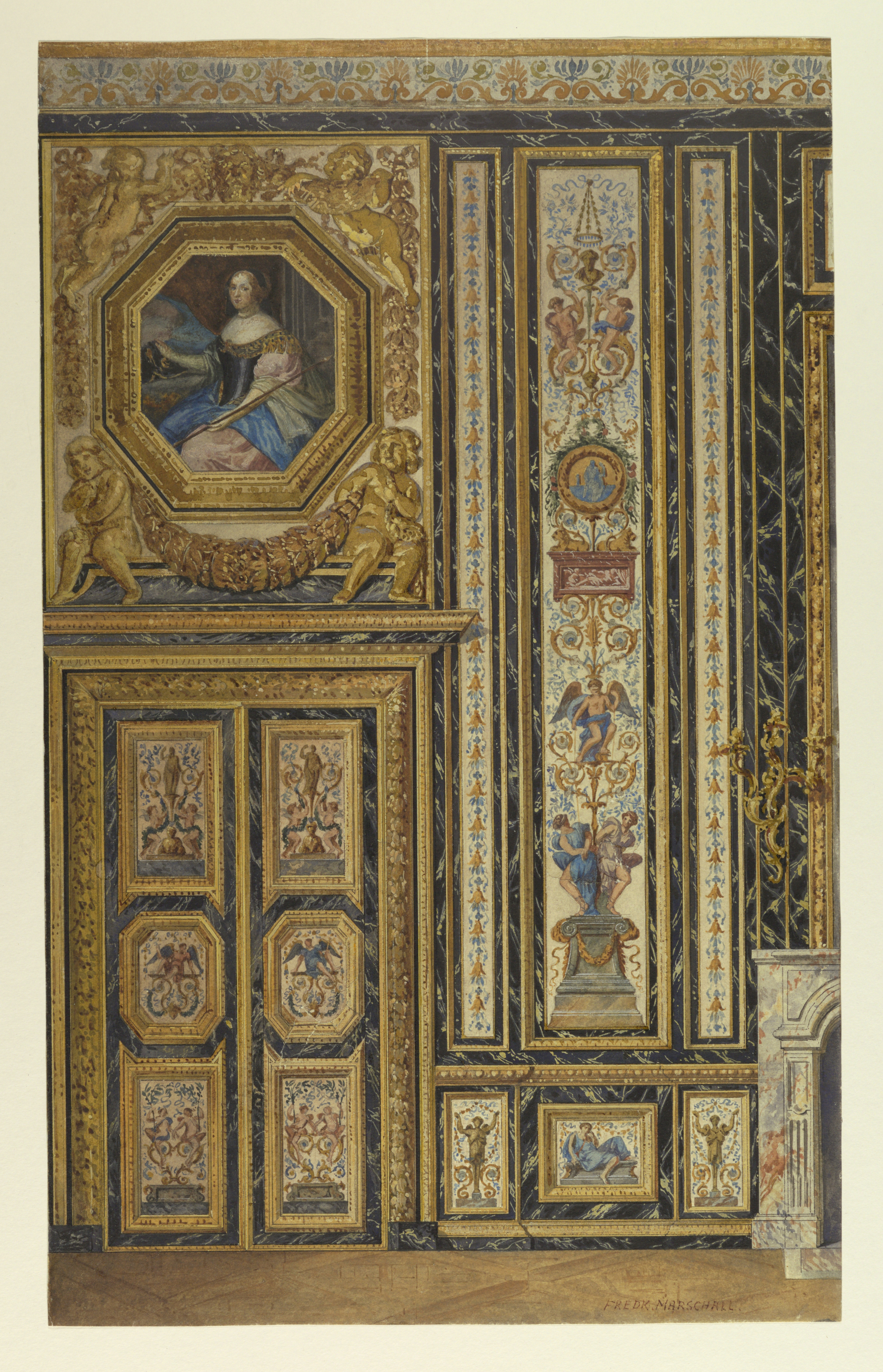
Arabesque wall panels in the Palace of Fontainebleau, Fontainebleau, France

Arabesques, often used on either framed or recessed wall panels, or applied directly onto flat walls using trompe-l'œil techniques to create the illusion of three-dimensional borders, were part of the decorative strategy. These panels, like the exterior design, also featured classical allegorical motifs such as acanthus leaves, vases, and mascarons. Additionally, chinoiserie iconography, reflecting European interpretations of Chinese and East Asian art, was prevalent. The motifs could be painted, plastered, or inlaid using materials like marquetry woodwork or lacquered jade. In the Catherine Palace, uniquely, these designs were even incorporated into multicolored amber panels.

Furniture and decorative arts from the Rococo period were designed to be both functional and comfortable. Contrasting with the large, dark, gold-framed wooden chairs of the earlier Baroque period, Rococo furniture typically featured upholstery with bright cushions and was built for moderately heavy use. Decorative elements such as soft-paste porcelain plaques were often inlaid into furniture pieces like wardrobes, commodes, console tables, secretaires, and writing tables. Complementary decorative objects, including pendulum clocks and vases, completed the embellishment of Rococo interiors.

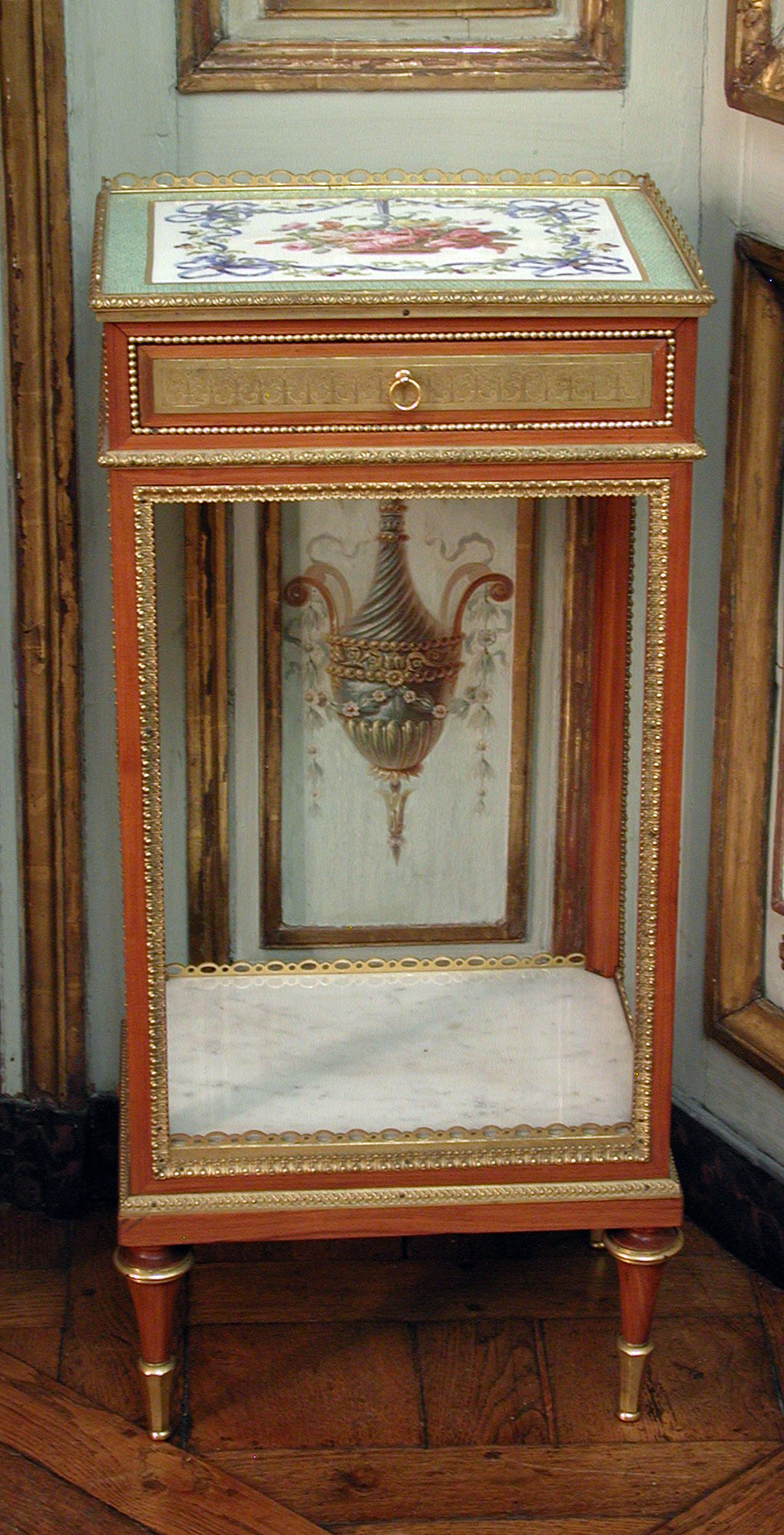
Console table inlaid with Sèvres soft-paste porcelain plaques

=== Flooring ===
During the Rococo period, wooden flooring often featured parquetry, a design technique involving the inlay of wood panels stained in various colors. These panels were arranged into symmetrical and visually captivating patterns.

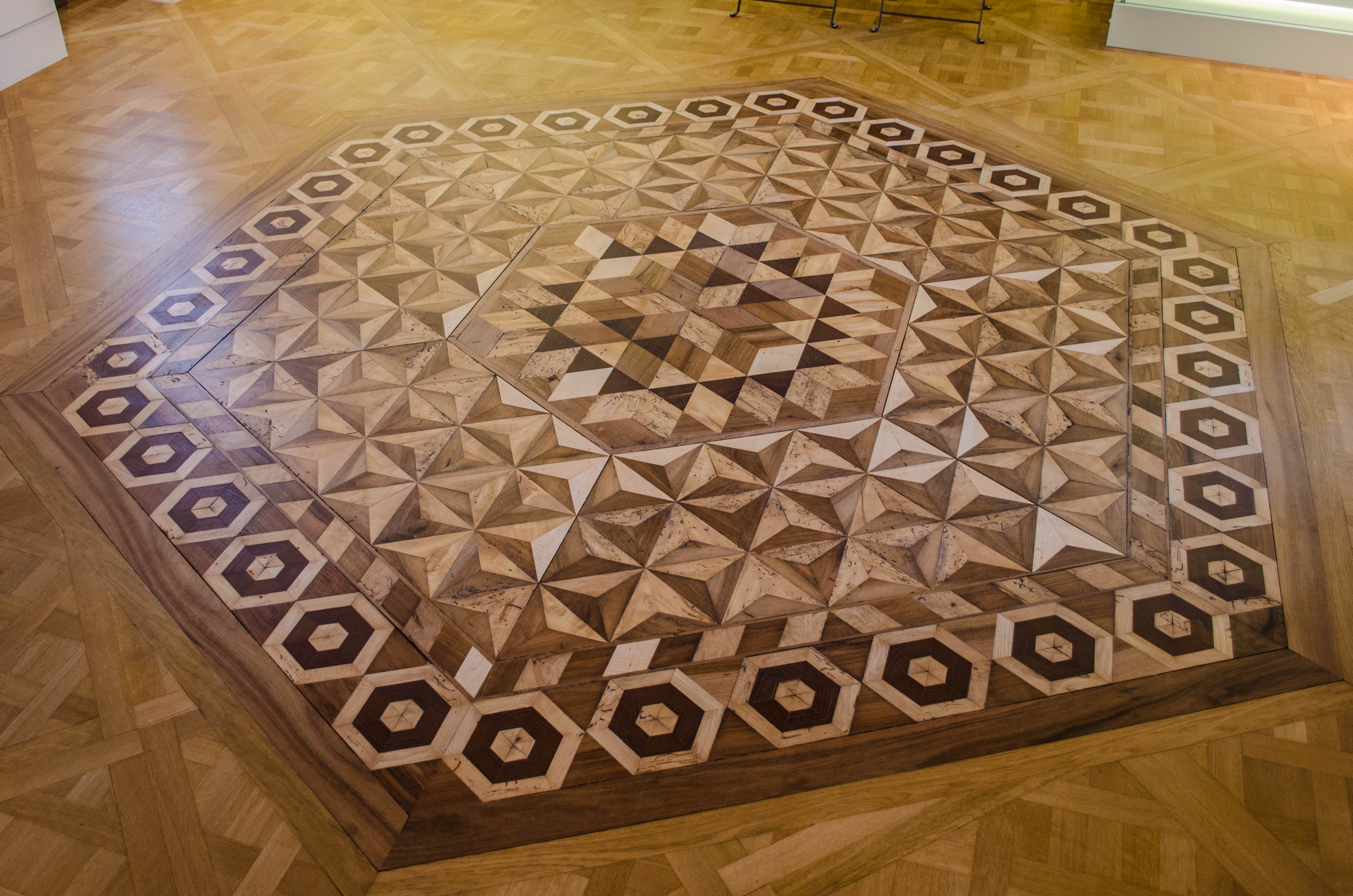
Flooring inlaid with parquetry woodwork in the Musée des Beaux-Arts, Valence, France

=== Plafonds ===
In large Rococo buildings, ceilings, often referred to as plafonds, were painted and gilded with scenes depicting ancient Greek and Roman myths, along with other classical and allegorical motifs. These decorations served dual purposes: they were visually stunning elements of interior design and also acted as representations of social values.

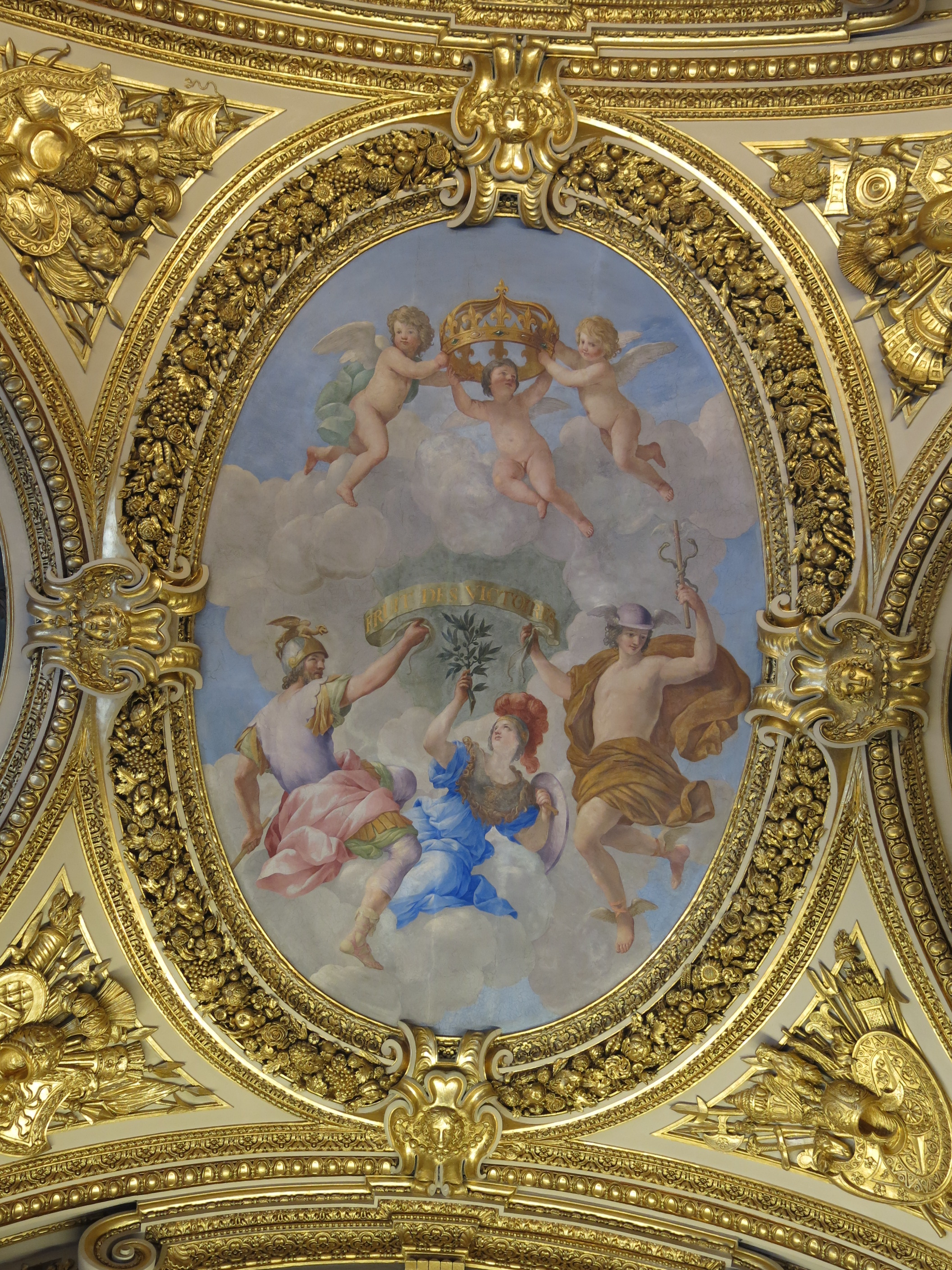
Plafond du Salon de la Paix, Louvre Palace, Paris, France

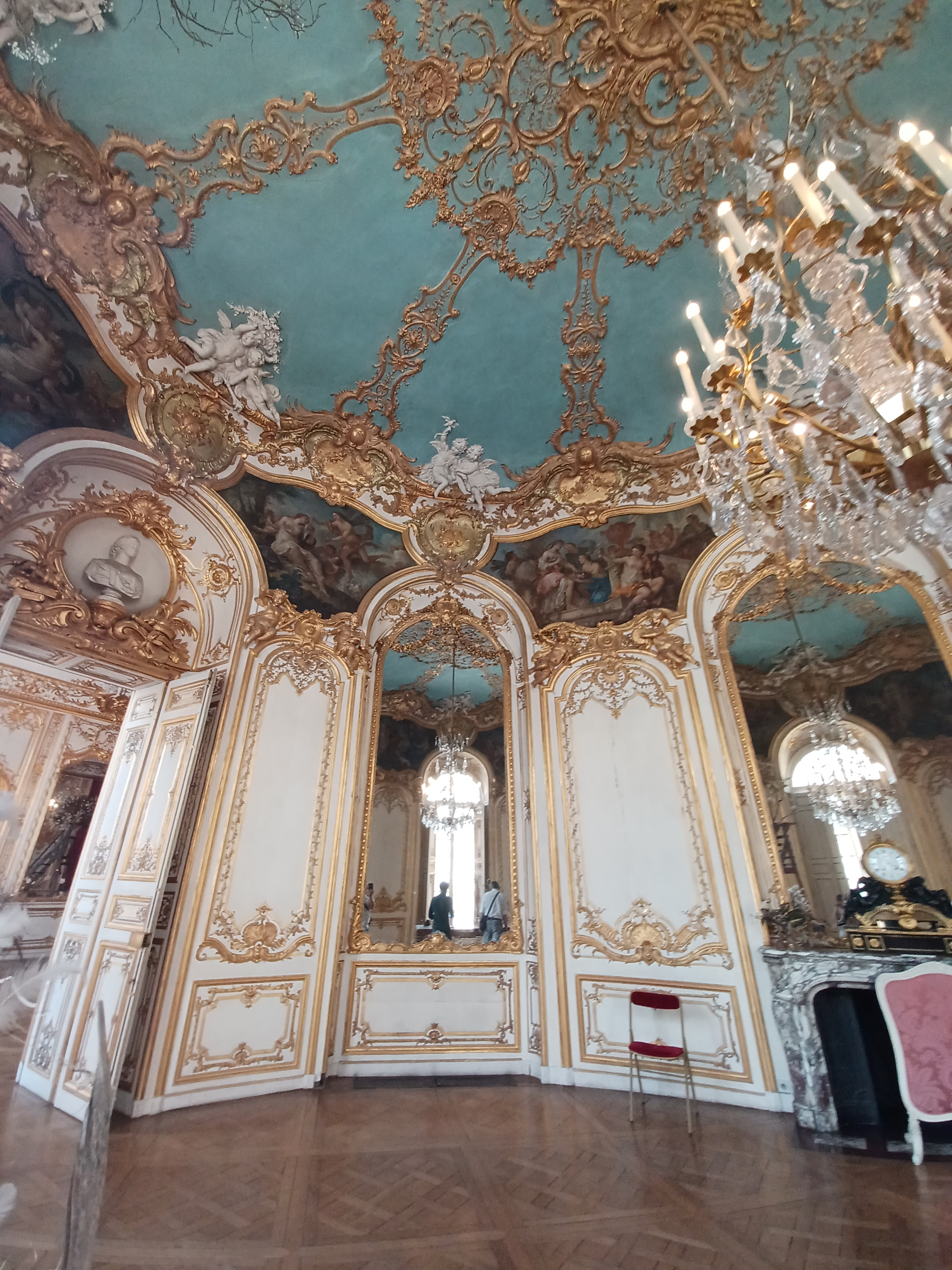
Salon de la Princesse, Hôtel de Soubise, Paris, France

== Interior layout ==
The interior layout of Rococo palaces often incorporated a multi-level design, typically featuring two, three, or four floors, each consisting of two rooms across its width. Rather than employing hallways or corridors for room access, these palaces were designed around one or more grand staircases, in addition to service stairwells and lifts, which led to a central point on the upper floors. From this central location, occupants and visitors would move through a series of rooms, such as libraries, antechambers, chambers, boudoirs, and dressing rooms. This progression from public to more private spaces facilitated both social interaction and the hierarchical use of space, while also maximizing the net usable area of the building by reducing the square footage dedicated to corridors and passageways.

When hallways were used, they were typically used only by servants and workers, often passing behind fireplaces and through service entrances. Higher-status individuals and guests would travel through the suite of connected rooms to reach their destinations. On the ground level, functional spaces such as butlers' pantries, guardrooms, ancillary offices, porcelain and silver cabinet rooms, and warming kitchens were positioned with easy access to outdoor outbuildings and service entries. Ceremonial spaces like ballrooms, chapels, reception rooms, principal offices, and state dining rooms were placed closer to the center of the palace, ensuring proximity to the grand staircase and accessibility to other related rooms.

== Outbuildings ==
=== Kitchens ===
In the eighteenth century, kitchens in large houses and palaces were typically constructed as separate buildings from the main structure. This separation was strategic, primarily to mitigate the heat and odors from cooking permeating the main living areas, and to decrease the risk of fire spreading to the palace if an incident occurred in the kitchen.

Once food was prepared in these external kitchens, it was transported to a warming kitchen located typically on the ground floor of the main building. In the warming kitchen, dishes were plated and prepared using utensils and tableware stored in nearby porcelain cabinets or butler's pantries. To ensure the food remained hot and ready for serving, it was then conveyed from the warming kitchen to the dining room. This transportation could be facilitated through specialized hallways, stairwells, or even a dumbwaiter.

The dumbwaiter varied in design, ranging from simple dumbwaiters to more sophisticated mechanical or steam-powered cargo elevators. Some systems, known as "thieves," were even more intricate, involving individual elevators at each place setting of the dining table. These systems allowed dishes to be raised and lowered directly between the warming kitchen and the dining room, potentially eliminating the need for servants to enter the dining area. This feature was particularly advantageous during meals where privacy was required, such as discussions involving confidential or classified information.

=== Retreat buildings ===
In some Rococo palace complexes, there were structures known as retreat buildings or hermitages, separate from the main palace. These structures provided a more intimate setting away from the main palace, which often included a large circulation of family members, government officials, servants, and guests. Hermitages were typically two stories high and contained a few rooms on each level.

=== Carriage houses ===
Rococo palace complexes frequently included carriage houses, which were used for storage and maintenance of horse-drawn wagons and related equipment. They were connected to stables and grazing areas to accommodate the horses that powered them.

In the English-speaking world, such complexes dedicated to equine housing and care were often referred to as mews buildings. Many historic British mansions featured a separate mews.

=== Service outbuildings and dependencies ===
Rococo palaces often featured a complex of outbuildings and dependencies designed to support the various operational needs of the estate. Beyond the primary cooking kitchen and the carriage house, these included structures such as the scullery, where vegetables were prepared and dishes were washed, and the smokehouse, used for preserving meats through smoking over hot coals to extend their freshness and usability.

Servant's quarters were another component of the palace infrastructure. These quarters were either housed in a separate outbuilding or located in a specific area of the main palace. When within the main building, the servants' quarters were often accessible only through a separate circulation system of corridors and stairwells, distinct from those used by the palace's higher-status occupants and visitors.

== Landscaping ==
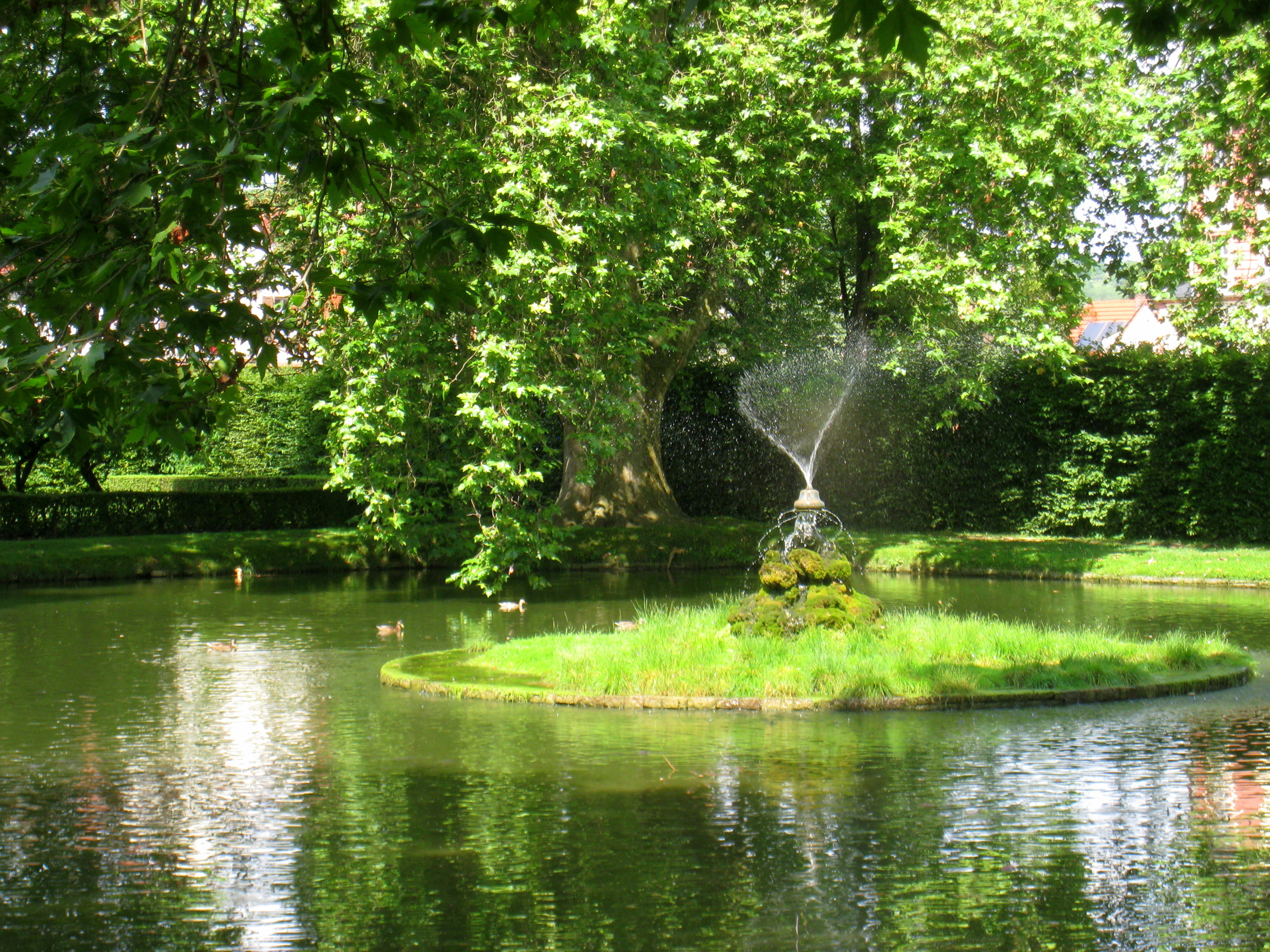
Rococo Garden, Veitshochheim Palace, Franconia, German Federation

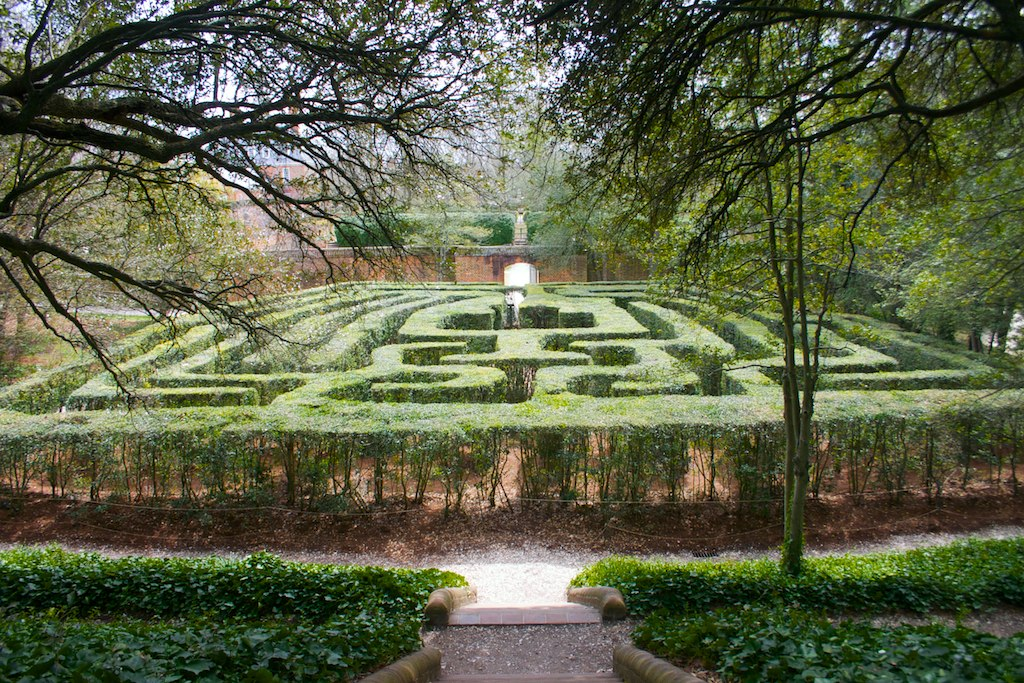
Hedge Maze, Governor's Palace (Williamsburg, Virginia) United States

Rococo palaces and grand houses contained severalformal and informal gardens, including parterres, vegetable gardens, hedge mazes, fountains, and reflecting ponds. Each of these elements served specific aesthetic and functional purposes within the landscape design.

Parterres were formal gardens maintained at a height of no more than about half a meter, using scythes and mowers. They were regarded as highly private outdoor areas ideal for discussing confidential matters, as the low height of the vegetation ensured that anyone within earshot was also visible, thus reducing the risk of eavesdropping.

Vegetable gardens were typically tended by servants and gardeners, producing fresh produce that supplemented food supplies from external sources.

Hedge mazes offered both entertainment and aesthetic appeal, with some designed with a single entrance and exit leading to a central cul-de-sac. This central feature often included small statues or fountains and provided a secluded spot for more private encounters, such as dates.

Among the decorative elements in these gardens, the campana vase was particularly notable. This large stone vase, with a narrow base and a wide, cylindrical body, drew inspiration from ancient Roman vases and jugs traditionally used in wine production in classical antiquity.

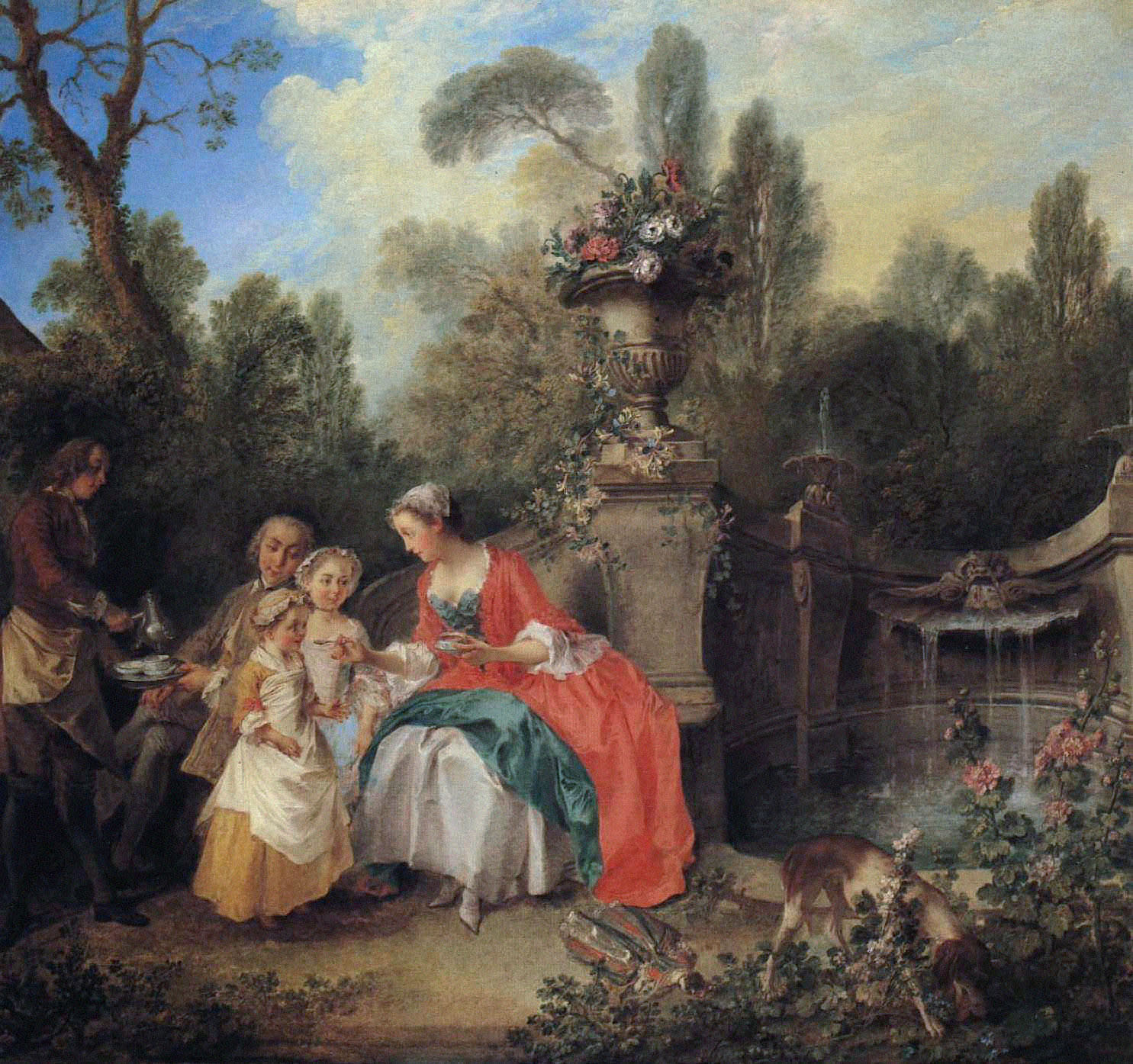
Nicolas Lancret's A Lady and Gentleman Taking Coffee with Children in a Garden
