= Gysbert Wigand Michelbecker =

Danish merchant (1636–1692)

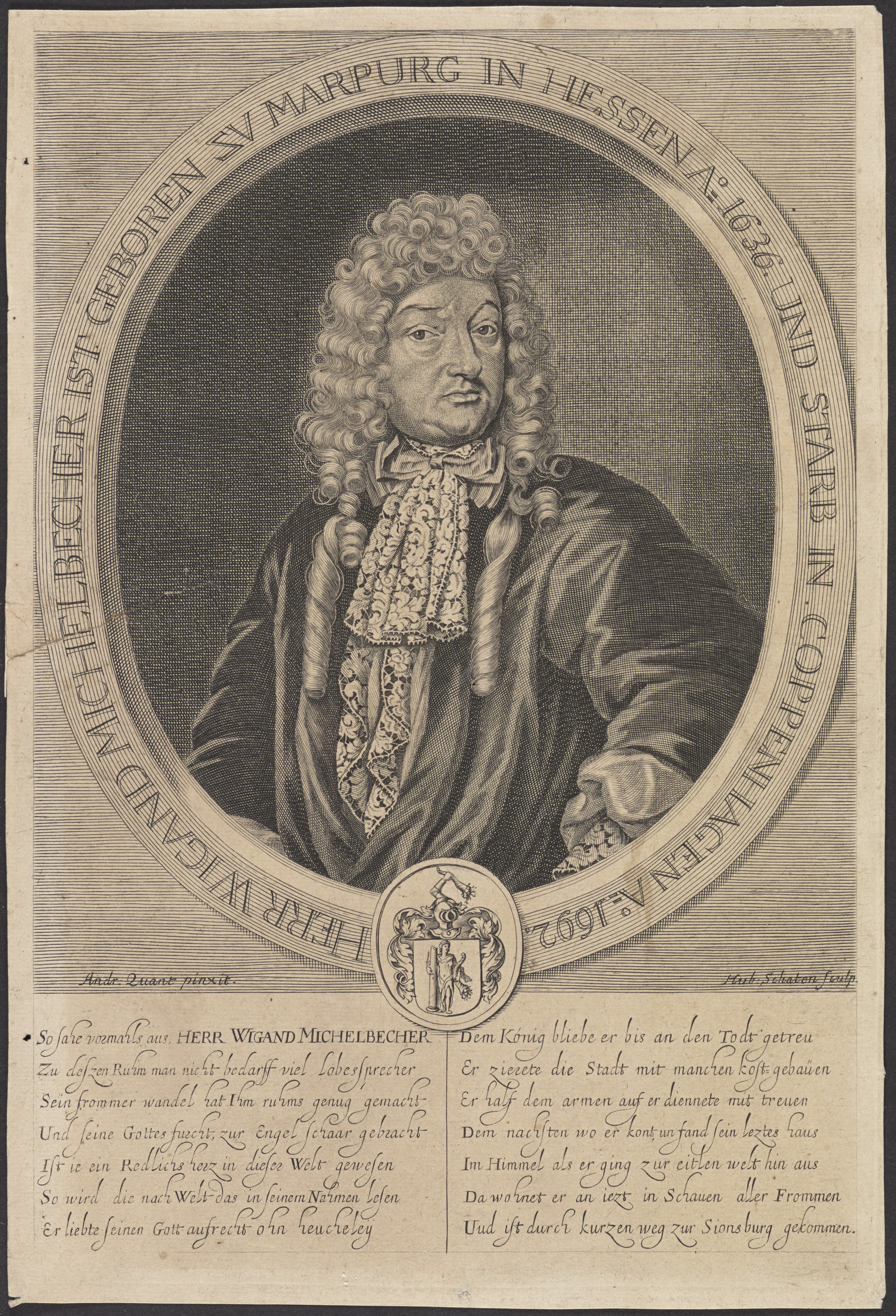
- Born: 17 January 1636; Marburg, Germany
- Died: 25 April 1692 (aged 56); Copenhagen, Denmark
- Occupations: Merchant and shipowner

Gysbert Wigand Michelbecker (17 January 1636 – 25 April 1692) was a Danish merchant, shipowner and property owner. He was one of the largest merchants in Copenhagen of his day and was from 1687 the owner of a large property at Frederiksholms Kanal in Copenhagen where the National Museum of Denmark stands today.

== Biography ==
Michelbecker was born in Marburg, the son of råds-forvandt and hospital manager Erich Michelbecker and his wife Elisabeth von Salzbudden (von Saltz Budden). He trained as a cooper in Sankt Goar and Frankfurt am Main.

Michelbecker came to Copenhagen in 1657 where he initially worked as a cellar man for wine merchant Johan Lehns and then as a clerk for wine merchant Johan Edinger. In 1661, Michelbecker established his own wine business with a large stock of wine which he had personally purchased in Amsterdam. His company grew steadily over the years and he was appointed royal cellar master in 1681. He was also engaged in import and export of other products and was by 1691 one of the largest merchants and ship owners in the city.

Michelbecker's trading house was initially based in a smaller building on Frederiksholm. In 1687, he constructed a large property overlooking Frederiksholms Kanal which also contained residences that were let out. The building was regarded as "a benefit to the city" and he was rewarded with twenty years of freedom from taxes as well as significant trade privileges.

== Other pursuits ==
Michelbecker was elected a member of the Council of 32 Men (later to become the Copenhagen City Council). He was also a co-director of the water supply. The Reformed Church, Copenhagen was initially based in his house from 1685–1689.

== Personal life ==
Michelbecker married Anne Ludewigs (Ludwig, Ludwigs) (15 July 1647 – 4 October 1724), daughter of merchant Johan Ludvigs (Ludwigs) (born 1619) and Elisabeth Martens, on 24 August 1663 in Copenhagen. They had 17 children, of which nine survived childhood. Six daughters married prominent merchants, civil servants and landowners. One of his daughters was killed in the fire at Sophie Amalienborg in 1689. His eldest son drowned when his father's ship, Sophia Amalia, wrecked off the coast of Norway in 1692. His son, Henrich Wigand Michelbecher (1672–1720), was the owner of the estate Selchausdal at Buerup Parish in Holbæk. He was married three times: 1) in 1697 with Cäcilie Holm (+ 1699); 2) in 1704 with Charlotte Amalie Lerche; and 3) in 1704 with the mother of many children, Elisabeth Sabine Rosbach (1691-1751 Eckernförde) (~ 2° Polish colonel Wiljott), daughter of Tobias Rosbach (1664-1728), postmaster in Rendsburg, and (~ 1690) Lucie Elisabeth Rebiger.

Michelbecker died in 1692 and was buried at St. Peter's Church (Sankt Petri Kirke) in Copenhagen. One of his sons-in-law, Wilhelm Edinger (1659–1733), took over his company as well as the property at Frederiksholms Kanal.

== See also ==
- Prince's Mansion, Copenhagen
