= Wilhelm Edinger =

Danish merchant (1659–1733)

Wilhelm Edinger (19 October 1659 – 4 July 1733) was a Danish merchant and ship-owner.

== Early life and education ==
Edinger was born on 19 October 1659 in Copenhagen, the son of wine merchant Johan Vilhelm Edinger (died 1667) and Elisabeth Kriech (died 1704). After his father's death, his mother was married in 1669 to wine merchant Johan Funck). His paternal family had been wine merchants in Copenhagen since the beginning of the century. They had close ties to the Lehn and Motzfeldt families. Peter Motzfeldt became his guardian upon the early death of his father.

== Career ==
Edinger's marriage to Gysbert Wigand Michelbecker's daughter secured him a position in some of Copenhagen's most prominent business circles. In 1690 he took a citizenship as a merchant and already in the same year he was mentioned among the city's most distinguished shipowners. In 1691 he helped draft the Exchange Ordinance (Børsordinansen). He was also elected as one of the directors of the Danish East India Company. In 1700 he was a member of a trade commission.

In 1723, together with two other merchants, he submitted a proposal to give Copenhagen a monopoly to stock wine, tobacco and salt. Although the proposal was immediately rejected by Kommercekollegiet, it was implemented by poster of 1 June 1726, but the monopoly was lifted again in 1730. He ran an extensive trade, particularly in West French and Spanish ports, partly with his own ships, partly in partnership with others. In addition to trading in goods, he ran an extensive brokerage and commission business, arranging exchange transactions and payments for the Rentekammeret.

== Property ==
As early as 1699 he was the third largest taxpayer in the Western Quarter (Vester Kvarter). In 1707, he took over his father-in-law's town mansion on Frederiksholms Kanal (now the Prince's Mansion). In 1716, Czar Peter the Great resided in the building during his stay in Copenhagen. In 1725, Edinger sold the mansion to Frederik IV, who converted it into a residence for Crown Prince Frederik. He then took up residence in a property he built in Stormgade (later known as the Raben Mansion).

== Personal life ==
On 15 December 1686, Edinger married Else Margrethe Michelbecker (1668–1720), daughter of merchant Gysbert Wigand M. (1636–1692) and Anna Ludewigs (1647–1724). Together, he and his wife had 21 children. Their daughter Sophie Amalie Edinger (1700–1768) was married to Abraham Lehn.
