= Løve Herreds Tinghus =

Listed building in Denmark

Løve Hundred Thing House
- Løve Herreds Tinghus
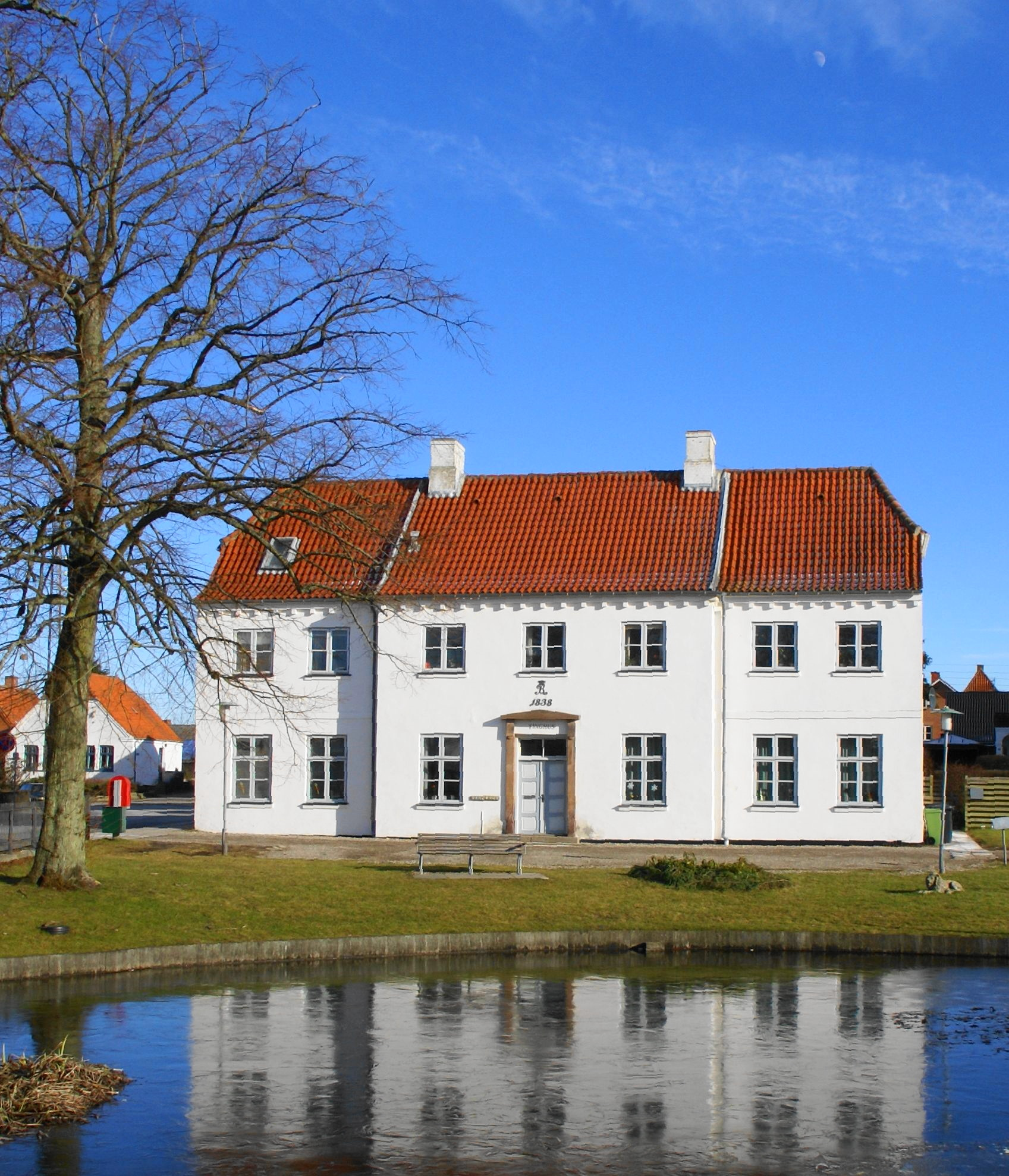
- Interactive map of the Løve Hundred Thing House area

General information
- Location: Ågårdsvej 11B, 4281 Gørlev, Denmark
- Coordinates: 55°30′42.41″N 11°17′27.17″E
- Completed: 1838

Løve Herred Tinghus (lit. "Løve Hundred Thing House"), situated on the north side of the village pond in Høng, Kalundborg Municipality, is the former meetingplace of the local thing in Løve Herred, a hundred, on western Zealand, some 80 km west of Copenhagen, Denmark. The building was constructed in 1838 to designs by Christian Frederik Hansen. Hansen's original design is, however, no longer visible, especially since the two single-storey lateral section of the building has been heightened. The roof and the small prison windows on the first floor have also been changed. The building was nonetheless listed on the Danish register of protected buildings and places in 1945.

== History ==
In the Middle Ages, Løve Herred belonged to Zealand's western syssel. When counties (Danish: Amter) were introduced in 1660, Løve Herred was placed under the small Sæbygaard County (Sæbygaard Amt), which only consisted of that one hundred. It was later administrated in association with Kalundborg and Dragsholm counties, and then, from 1792, merged with Holbæk County. It was the southernmost and third largest hundred in Holbæk County.

The hundred took its name from the small town of Løve. It was customary for Danish hundreds to take their names after small and relatively insignificant localities. The hundred's first thingstead was located in Løve. In 1681, it relocated to Sæbygård. In 1752, it was moved back to Løve.

The first half of the 19th century saw the construction of numerous purpose-built thing houses across Denmark. Christian Frederik Hansen created to design proposals for a thing house in Høng. The plans were initially put on hold for economic reasons but later revived. The new thing house in Høng was completed in 1838.

The building was listed on the Danish register of protected buildings and places in 1945. It was subject to another adaption when it was sold in the 1950s.

== Architecture ==
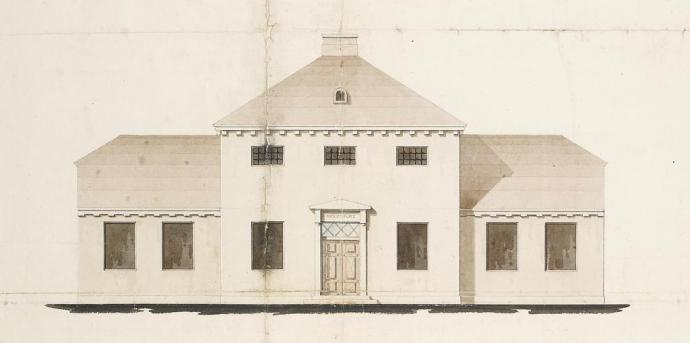
The building's original design

Løve Herreds Tinghus is a two-storey, white-washed brick building. The seven-bay-wide facade features a slightly projecting three-bay median risalit. Christian Frederik Hansen's original design is no longer visible, especially since the two lateral sections were only one storey tall.

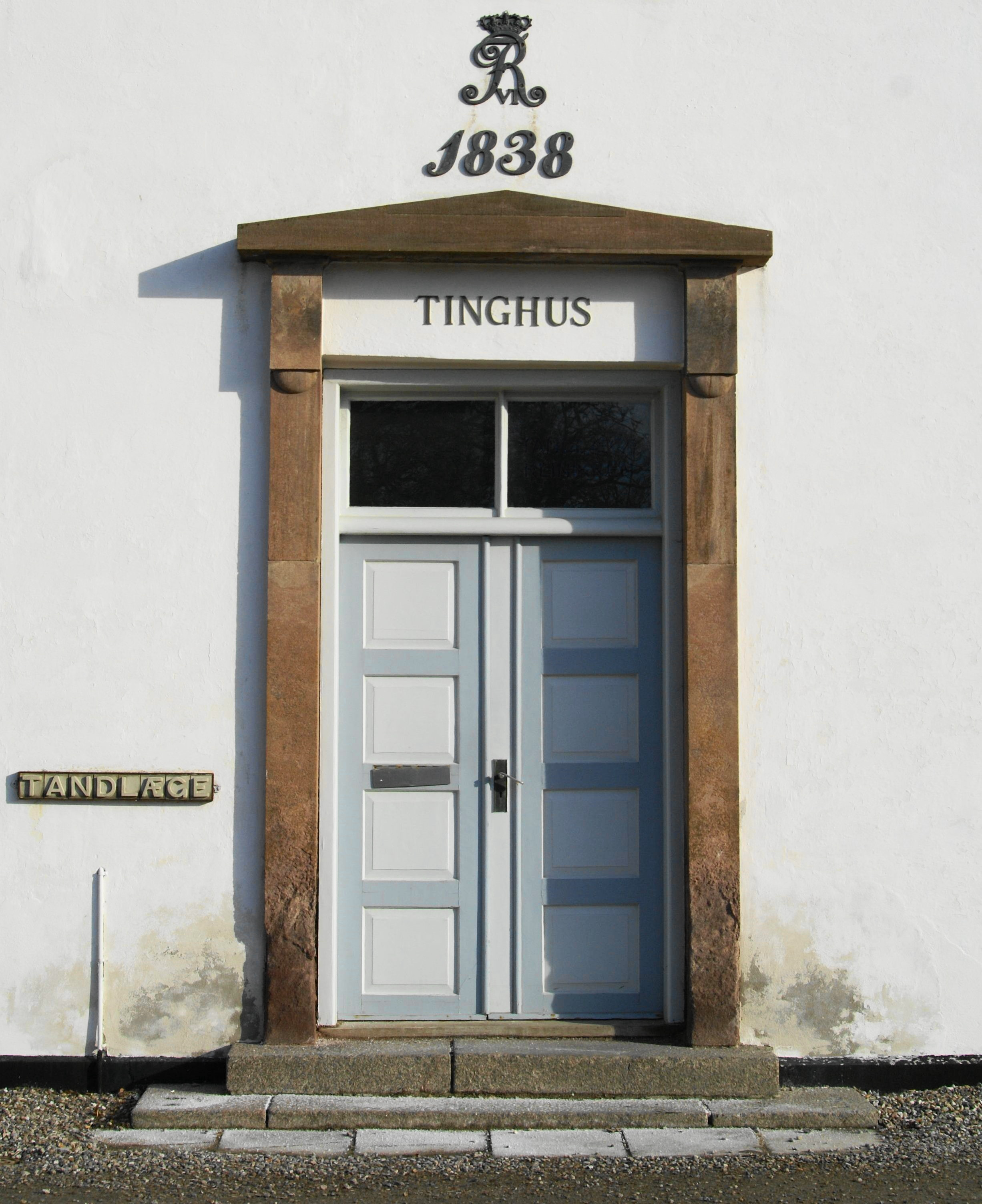
The main entrance

The two-storey portion of the building was topped by a pyramidical roof with a single chimney. When the two lateral sections were heightened with one floor, to make room for more jail cells, it was replaced by a half-hipped red tile roof in the full length of the building. The roof ridge is pierced by two chimneys. The facade is finished by a dentillated cornice. The central main entrance is accented by a Neoclassical portal with pilasters and a triangular pediment supported by corbels. The doorway is topped by a transom window. The word "Tinghus" is inscribed on the wall between the window and the triangular pediment. Above the portal is a royal cifre. The small prison windows with bars on the first floor were replaced by larger windows in 1966.
