= Selchausdal =

Historical property near Copehnhagen, Denmark

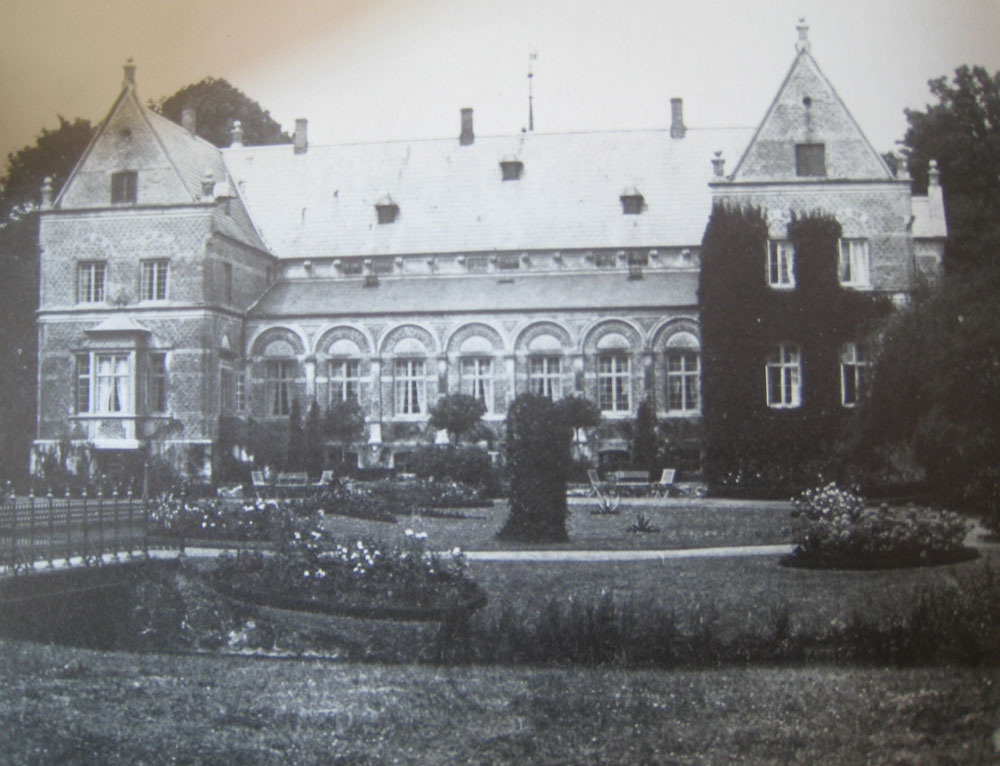
- Vintage photo of the main building as seen from the garden
- Interactive map of the Selchausdal area

General information
- Architectural style: Renaissance Revival
- Location: Selchausdalvej 4; 4291 Ruds Vedby, Denmark
- Coordinates: 55°35′2.8″N 11°19′37.2″E
- Completed: 1857

Selchausdal, formerly Gundetved, is a manor house and estate located on the east side of Tissø, Kalundborg Municipality, some 92 kilometres west of Copenhagen, Denmark. The three-winged Renaissance Revival style main building is from 1857 and was designed by Johan Daniel Herholdt. It was listed on the Danish registry of protected buildings and places in 1978.

== History ==
=== Gundetved ===
The name is first recorded as Gunnethueth in 1339, when it was owned by Mathias Jensen. In 1451, Gundetved belonged to Otte Limbæk. His daughter, the widow of Jon Bille, was the owner in 1489, The ownership of the estate was later ceded to Niels Henriksen as dowry in connection with his marriage to her daughter Margrete Bille. He was ennobled in 1526 under the name Arenfeldtand. He succeeded Jørgen Marsvin as Chancellor of the Realm in circa 1526. After Niels Henriksen Arenfeldt's death in 1533, Gundetved was passed on to their sons Henrik and Torben Arenfeldt. Henrik Arenfeldt's son Niels Arenfeldt was from circa 1580 the owner of the estate. He is known to have had at least 13 children with four different women. This led to an impeachment for breach of the Sixth Commandment in which he was sentenced to paying a fine to a hospital and secretly make his confessions of penitents.

In 1628, Gundetved was acquired by Ernst Normand. He sold the estate to Joachim Normand in 1636. They had both come to Denmark from Rügen. In 1645, Gundetved was acquired by Axel Juul of Volstrup who would later also acquire Sæbygaard and Kattrup. In 1664, he sold all his estates to Treasure Henrik Müller.

Müller's son, Frants Müller, sold the estate to Bertel Jensen, who in turn sold it to Axel Nielsen.

In 1696, Gundetved was acquired by Brostrup Albertin, a Supreme Court attorney. In 1710, he sold the estate to Henrik Wigant Michelbecher. He was the son of Gysbert Wigand Michelbecker. In 1723, Michelbecher's widow sold the estate at a very low price to Jacob Benzon. In 1729, Benzon sold the estate to Frederik Adeler for just over twice the price that he had paid six years earlier.

=== Selchau family, 1782–1940 ===
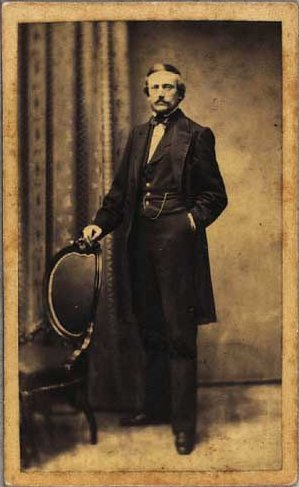
Christian Andreas Selchau

In 1782, Gundetved was acquired by Christian Andreas Selchau, a son of the owner of Benzonslund at Ringsted, who renamed the estate Selchausdal in 1799. On his death in 1816, Selchausdal was owned by his widow until their son Jens Christian Selchau took over in 1821.

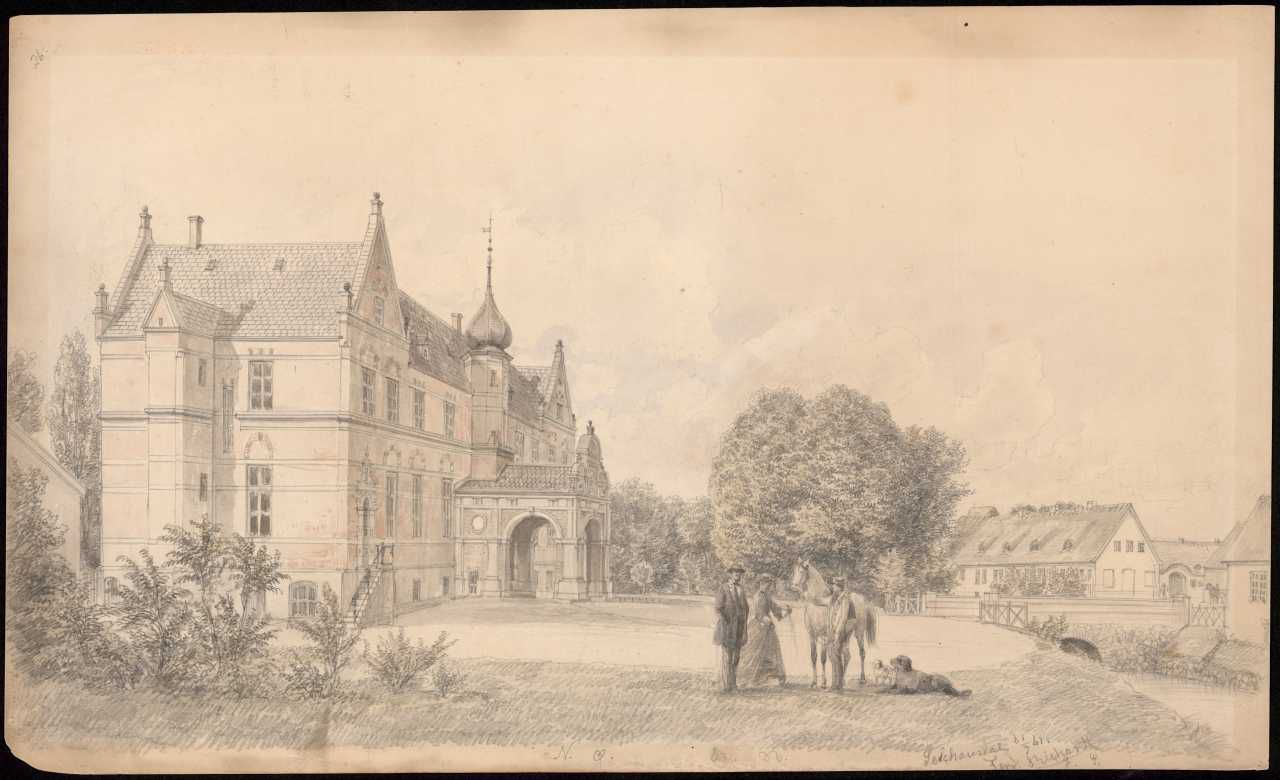
The new main building seen in a drawing by Ferdinand Richardt

Jens Christian Selchau died in 1820. His widow, Annette Christiane von Herbst, ceded it to their son Christian Andreas Selchau when she remarried in 1842. Christian Andreas Selchau commissioned Johan Daniel Herholdt to design a new main building which was completed in 1857.

Christian Andreas Selchau died unmarried in 1893. Selchausdal was then passed to his sister, Michelle Christiane Selchau. She converted the property into a home for 12 elderly women. After her early death, Selchausdal passed to her cousin, Gundo S. Vogt.

=== Later owners, 1940–present ===
In 1940, Selchausdal was acquired by Consul General H. O. Lange. He left the estate to a foundation.

== Architecture ==
The two-storey main building is designed with inspiration from Renaissance architecture. The building is constructed in red brick with horizontal bands and other details in cement. The north-facing principal facade features a central tower topped by an onion dome while the two outer bays at each end are topped by tall gables. Two short side wings project from the rear side of the building.

The building was refurbished in 1940–41 under supervision of A. Maar. The original open porte-cochère was at this event converted into a closed structure.

== Today ==
The main building is now operated as a venue for meetings and other events. Selchausdal is a member of Small Danish Hotels.

== List of owners ==
- (1339) Mathias Jensen
- (1451) Otte Limbæk
- (1489) Lene Limbæk, gift Bille
- ( –1533) Niels Henriksen Arenfeldt
- (1533–1580) Henrik Arenfeldt
- (1533–1580) Torben Arenfeldt
- (1580–1628) Niels Arenfeldt
- (1628–1636) Ernst Normand
- (1636–1645) Joachim Normand
- (1645–1664) Axel Juul
- (1664– ) Henrik Müller
- ( – ) Frants Müller
- ( – ) Bertel Jensen
- ( –1696) Jacob Nielsen
- (1696–1710) Brostrup Albertin
- (1710–1720) Henrik Wigand Michelbecker
- (1720–1723) Elisabeth Sabine Rosbach
- (1723–1729) Jacob Benzon
- (1729–1755) Frederik Adeler
- (1755– ) Lars Biørn
- ( –1775) Nikolaj Frederik Schumacher
- (1775– ) Hedevig Sophie Levetzow
- ( –1778) Estate of Hedevig Sophie Levetzow
- (1778–1782) Mathias Brønstorph
- (1782–1791) Niels Munch Krag
- (1791–1817) Christian Andreas Selchau
- (1817–1821) Karen Kjær, gift Selchau
- (1821–1829) Jens Christian Selchau
- (1829–1843) Annette Christiane Herbst, gift Selchau
- (1843–1893) Christian Andreas Selchau
- (1893–1914) Michelle Christiane Selchau
- (1914–1940) Gundo S. Vogt
- (1940–1961) H.O. Lange
- (1961– ) H.O. Langes Selchausdal Fond
- (1992–present) Peter Vagn-Jensen

== See also ==
- Frihedslund
