= Theodor Vilhelm Ankarcrona =

Theodor Vilhelm Ankarcrona was a Gentleman of the Bedchamber of the King of Sweden.

== Family and children ==
He married firstly Charlotta, Baroness Sture, and had at least three sons, Conrad Victor Ankarcrona (1823–1912), Grand Master of the Court of the King of Sweden, etc., who married in 1851 his cousin Ebba Charlotta, Countess Bielke (1828–1911), and had issue, Alexis Ankarcrona (1825–1901) and Henric August Ankarcrona (1831–1917) who became officer in the French Army in French Algeria and Morocco; and a daughter, Charlotta Adelaide Sofie, who married Baron Carl Frederik von Blixen-Finecke (1822–1873).
