= Listed buildings in Kalundborg Municipality =

This is a list of listed buildings in Kalundborg Municipality, Denmark.

== The list ==
=== 4270 Høng ===
| Listing name | Image | Location | Year built | Contributing resource | Ref |
|---|---|---|---|---|---|
| Løve Herreds Tinghus | | Hovedgaden 52A, 4270 Høng | | Assembly building from 1838 by C.F. Hansen with later alterations | Ref |
| Løve Windmill | | Knudstrupvej 6A, 4270 Høng | | Smock mill from 1880 | Ref |

=== 4281 Gørlev ===
| Listing name | Image | Location | Year built | Contributing resource | Ref |
|---|---|---|---|---|---|
| Aagaard | | Ågårdsvej 11, 4281 Gørlev | | Main building's South Wing and side wing | Ref |
| Aagaard | | Ågårdsvej 11B, 4281 Gørlev | | Main wing's central part | Ref |
| Hans Petersens Gård | | Strandvejen 52, 4281 Gørlev | | Four-winged farmhouse from c. 1800 | Ref |
| Mortensgård | | Skansevej 11, 4281 Gørlev | 1752 | | |
| Mortensgård | | Skansevej 11, 4281 Gørlev | | | |
| Reersø Museum | | Skansevej 4, 4281 Gørlev | | Half-timbered building from the 18th century | Ref |
| Skansevej 10 | | Skansevej 10, 4281 Gørlev | 1752 | | |
| Skansevej 10 | | Skansevej 10, 4281 Gørlev | | | |
| Strandvejen 38 | | Strandvejen 38, 4281 Gørlev | | Four-winged building of which the residential wing and the gate wing to the south date from c. 1750-60, the west wing fates from c. the 1870s and the north wing dates from 1912 | Ref |

=== 4291 Ruds Vedby ===
| Listing name | Image | Location | Year built | Contributing resource | Ref |
|---|---|---|---|---|---|
| Kragerup | | Kragerupgårdsvej 33, 4291 Ruds Vedby | | Three-winged main building from 1801-02 | Ref |
| Selchausdal | | Selchausdalvej 4, 4291 Ruds Vedby | | Three-winged building from 57 by Hohan Daniel Herholdt which was refurbished in 1941 by Axel Maar | Ref |

=== 4400 Kalundborg ===
| Listing name | Image | Location | Year built | Contributing resource | Ref |
|---|---|---|---|---|---|
| Acciseboden | | Sct Jørgensbjerg 1, 4400 Kalundborg | | | Ref |
| Adelgade 0: Vor Frue Kirkes Plads | | Adelgade 0, 4400 Kalundborg | | Public space from 1953 by Carl Theodor Sørensen | Ref |
| Adelgade 6: Bispegården | | Adelgade 6, 4400 Kalundborg | | Building from the Middle Ages | Ref |
| Adelgade 8: Kalundborg Old Town Hall | | Adelgade 8, 4400 Kalundborg | | Former town hall from 1539-1854 | Ref |
| Adelgade 10 | | Adelgade 10, 4400 Kalundborg | | House from the 18th century | Ref |
| Adelgade 13 | | Adelgade 13, 4400 Kalundborg | | House from the 17th century which was altered in the 1870s and again in 1970 | Ref |
| Adelgade 15 | | Adelgade 15, 4400 Kalundborg | | House probably from the 16th century but altered in 1970 | Ref |
| Adelgade 17: Schou House | | Adelgade 17, 4400 Kalundborg | | Building from the early 17th century but altered in 1979 | Ref |
| Adelgade 18 | | Adelgade 18, 4400 Kalundborg | | House from c. 1645 with later alterations and the garden with the old mulberry tree | Ref |
| Adelgade 19 | | Adelgade 19, 4400 Kalundborg | | House from the early 17th century | Ref |
| Adelgade 23; Lindegården | | Adelgade 23, 4400 Kalundborg | | | Ref |
| Gl. Røsnæsvej 9 | | Gl Røsnæsvej 9, 4400 Kalundborg | | | Ref |
| Gyths Gård | | Torvet 12, 4400 Kalundborg | | House with side wings on Adelgade and Munkesøgade from 1834 | Ref |
| Kålund Kloster | | Klosterparkvej 7, 4400 Kalundborg | | Main building from 1752 attrivuted to Johan Christian Conradi | Ref |
| Kordilgade 1: Ole Lund House | | Kordilgade 1, 4400 Kalundborg | | | Ref |
| Kordilgade 13 | | Kordilgade 13, 4400 Kalundborg | | Building fronting the street from 1850 | Ref |
| Kordilgade 13 | | Kordilgade 13, 4400 Kalundborg | | Side wing from 1850 and later | Ref |
| Kordilgade 13 | | Kordilgade 13, 4400 Kalundborg | | Rear wing from c. 1650 | Ref |
| Kordilgade 83: Brænderigården | | Kordilgade 83, 4400 Kalundborg | | Building from 1783 | Ref |
| Lerchenborg (10) | | Lerchenborg 1-13, 4400 Kalundborg | | Main building from the 1740s by Niels Eigtved and stables etc | Ref |
| Lindegade 1 | | Skibbrogade 55, 4400 Kalundborg | | Half-timbered building from 1681 | Ref |
| Lindegade 3 | | Lindegade 3, 4400 Kalundborg | | Half-timbered building from c. 1681 | Ref |
| Lindegade 4: Kalundborg Old Pharmacy | | Lindegade 4, 4400 Kalundborg | | Building of which the western portion dates from c. 1764 and was probably built by Philip Hartmann | Ref |
| Møllestræde 2 | | Møllestræde 2, 4400 Kalundborg | | Building from the 18th century | Ref |
| Præstegade 14: Kalundborg Latin School | | Præstegade 14, 4400 Kalundborg | | Stone building from the Middle Ages | Ref |
| Præstegade 18: Rector's House | | Præstegade 18, 4400 Kalundborg | | | Ref |
| Præstegade 23 | | Præstegade 23, 4400 Kalundborg | | Former rectory from the Middle Ages | Ref |
| Sneglehøj | | Asnæs Skovvej 0, 4400 Kalundborg | | The mound with the ice house from 1745 | Ref |
| Svallerup Kirkelade | | Svallerup Bygade 3A, 4400 Kalundborg | | Building from the Late Middle Ages | Ref |

=== 4592 Sejerø ===
| Listing name | Image | Location | Year built | Contributing resource | Ref |
|---|---|---|---|---|---|
| Sejerø Kirkelade | | Mastrupvej 4A, 4592 Sejerø | | Stone building from the Middle Ages at the east side of the cemetery wall | Ref |
