= Runsa =

Estate in Stockholm County, Sweden

Coordinates: 66.2775°N 22.9136°E

- Upplands Väsby Municipality, Sweden
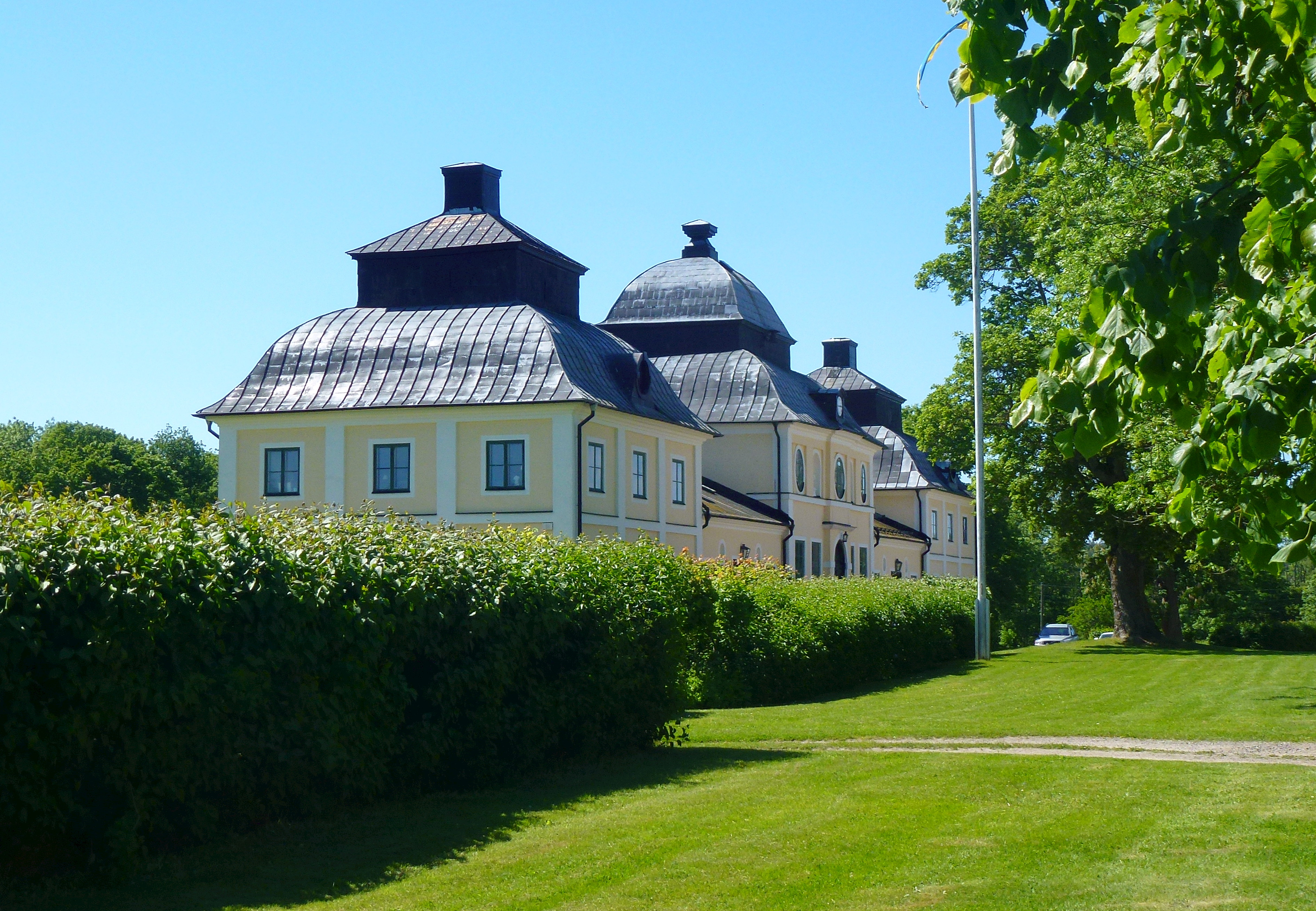
- Runsa Manor

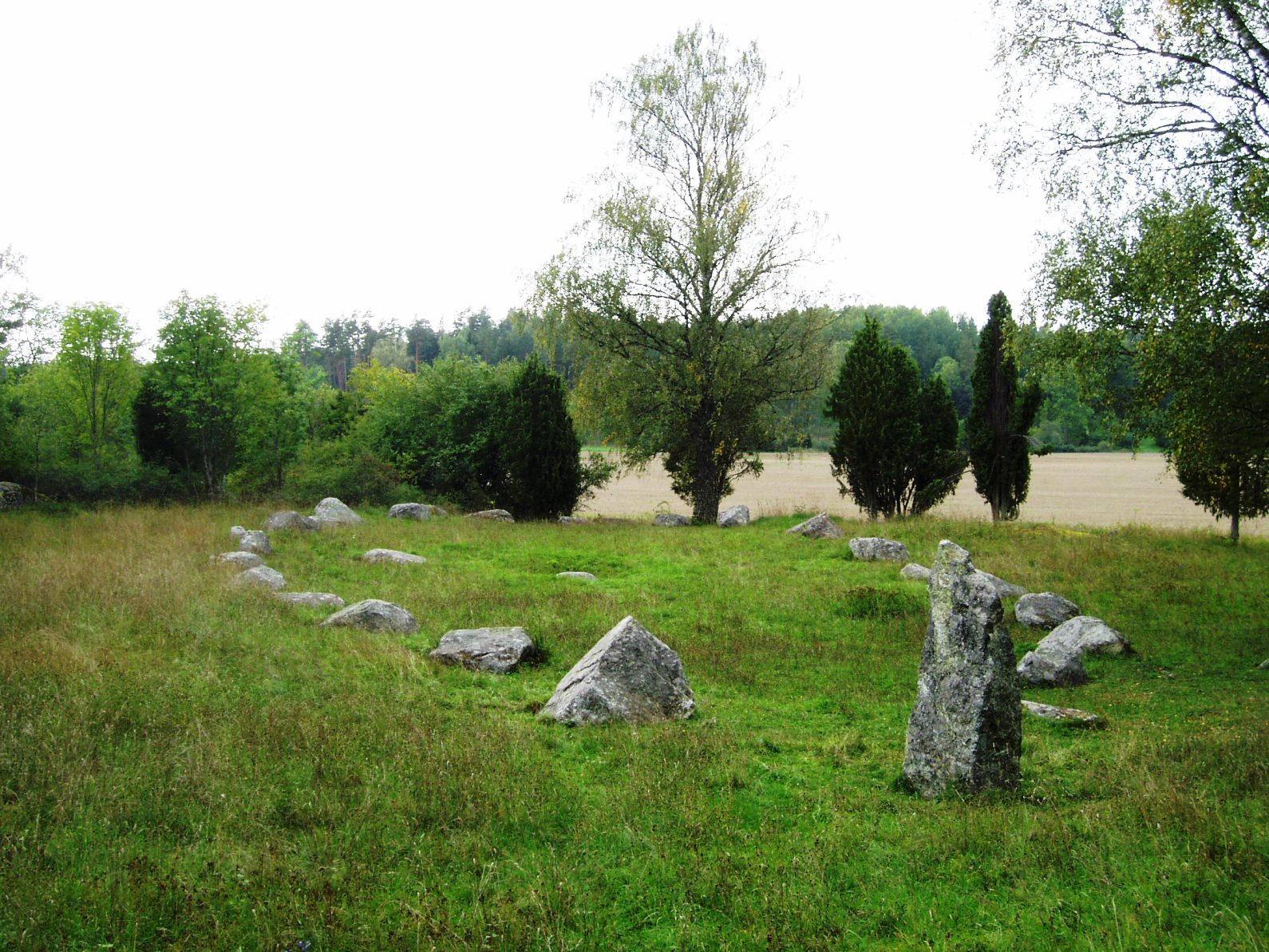
Stone ship burial area at Runsa

Runsa is an estate located in Upplands Väsby Municipality in Stockholm County, Sweden. It the site of the ruins of an ancient fortification (Runsa fornborg) and of Runsa Manor (Runsa slott) which was built in the middle of the 17th century.

== History ==
Runsa was the site of a prehistoric hill fortification. Runsa was strategically situated on a 30 metre high rock promontory in Lake Mälaren, with views towards Sigtuna. The ancient fort covers an area of 200 x 100 metres. The site was excavated first in 1902 with the participation of the then Crown Prince, later King Gustaf VI Adolf of Sweden. It was later investigated by archaeologists in 1992.

Below the ruins is a stone ship burial area (Runsa skeppssättning; sv) with some 30 graves. The burial ground is made up of round stones estimated to date from 400 - 500 AD. It is 56 feet from the bow to the stern and is one of the best known stone circles in Sweden.

Runsa Manor (Runsa slott) is surrounded by these ruins and other monuments. In 1313 the estate was sold to the Archbishop of Uppsala. It was suppressed by King Gustav Vasa, but was sold to Lord High Constable Jacob De la Gardie (1583–1652). The main building dates from the mid-1600s and was most possibly built by his widow Ebba Brahe (1596-1674). She willed the estate to her daughter Christina Catharine De la Gardie (1632–1704), wife of Gustaf Otto Stenbock (1614–1685).

== See also ==
- List of castles in Sweden
