= List of people declared Servants of God under Pope Francis =

This article is a list of people proposed by each diocese of the Catholic Church for beatification and canonization, whose causes have been officially opened during the papacy of Pope Francis and are newly given the title as Servants of God. The names listed below are from the Vatican and are listed in month beginning the year 2013, with their birth and death year, position in clerical or religious life, and the place where the potential Saints lived or died.

In the Latin Church of the Catholic Church, Servant of God is a title used for a person for whom a beatification process has been opened.

== 2025 ==
Name	Born	Died	Country	Diocese	Cause	Notes
Maria Milza	15 August 1923	17 December 1993	Brazil	Ruy Barbosa	Heroic Virtues	Layperson
Bernardin Gantin	8 May 1922	13 May 2008	Benin	Cotonou	Heroic Virtues	Cardinal, Dean of the College of Cardinals

== 2024 ==
Name	Born	Died	Country	Diocese	Cause	Notes
Maurice Blondel	2 November 1861	4 June 1949	France	Aix-en-Provence and Arles	Heroic Virtues	Married Layperson
Stephen Kim Sou-hwan	May 8, 1922	February 16, 2009	South Korea	Seoul	Heroic Virtues	Cardinal, Archbishop Emeritus of Seoul
Stefano Gobbi	March 22, 1930	June 29, 2011	Italy	Como	Heroic Virtues	Priest, Founder, Marian Movement of Priests
Pierre Lambert de la Motte	January 16, 1624	June 15, 1679	France; Vietnam	Phan Thiết	Heroic Virtues	Bishop, Member, Paris Foreign Missions Society
Luís Cecchin	December 11, 1924	March 26, 2010	Italy; Brazil	Nazaré	Heroic Virtues	Professed Priest
Cecilia María de la Santa Faz	December 5, 1973	June 22, 2016	Argentina	Santa Fe	Heroic Virtues	Professed Religious of the Discalced Carmelite Nuns
Adélia Teixeira de Carvalho	December 16, 1922	October 13, 2013	Brazil	Pesqueira	Heroic Virtues	Professed religious of Christian Instruction; Marian seer
Liubomyr Huzar	February 26, 1933	May 31, 2017	Ukraine	Kyiv–Galicia	Heroic Virtues	Cardinal, Major Archbishop
Alexandre Toé	December 2, 1967	December 9, 1996	Burkina Faso; Italy	Rome	Heroic Virtues	Priest, Member, Order of the Ministers of the Infirm
Bento Manuel Nogueira	April 5, 1927	October 26, 2003	Portugal; Mozambique	Lisbon	Heroic Virtues	Priest, Member, Brothers Hospitallers of Saint John of God, Missionary

== 2023 ==
Name	Born	Died	Country	Diocese	Cause	Notes
Amalia of Jesus Flagellated	July 22, 1901	April 18, 1977	Brazil	Campinas	Heroic Virtues	Professed religious of Missionaries of Crucified Jesus; Marian seer
Niña Ruiz Abad	October 31, 1979	August 16, 1993	Philippines	Laoag	Heroic Virtues	Young Layperson
Vivian Uchechi Ogu	April 1, 1995	November 15, 2009	Nigeria	Benin City	Martyr in defensum castitatis	Young Layperson
Antônio Campelo de Aragão	October 5, 1904	September 10, 1988	Brazil	Petrolina	Heroic Virtues	Bishop
Kanteshwar Digal and 34 companions	Many	August 2008	India	Cuttack-Bhubaneswar	Martyr in odium fidei	Professed Priest, Laypersons

== 2022 ==
Name	Born	Died	Country	Diocese	Cause	Notes
Adelaide Molinari	2 February 1938	14 April 1985	Brazil	Marabá	Heroic Virtues	Professed Religious of the Daughters of Divine Charity
Gilberto Agustoni	26 July 1922	31 January 2017	Switzerland; Italy	Rome	Heroic Virtues	Titular Cardinal Santi Urbano e Lorenzo a Prima Porta; Cardinal
Maria Cecilia Baij	4 January 1694	6 January 1766	Italy	Viterbo	Heroic Virtues	Professed Religious, Benedictine Nuns
Akash Bashir	22 June 1994	15 March 2015	Pakistan	Lahore	Martyr in odium fide	Young Layperson
Nemésio Bernardi	9 March 1927	4 February 2016	Brazil	Rio de Janeiro	Heroic Virtues	Professed Religious Capuchin
Maria Pia Brando	3 June 1851	27 August 1916	Italy	Naples	Heroic Virtues	Founder, Franciscan Sisters of the Sacred Heart (now united with Oblation Sisters of the Blessed Sacrament)
Luigi Brutti	23 November 1984	19 August 2011	Italy	Viterbo	Heroic Virtues	Layperson
Luso de Barros Matos	16 December 1906	3 August 1987	Brazil	Porto Nacional	Heroic Virtues	Professed Priest
Henri Caumont (religious name: Fortunat of Tours)	10 December 1871	6 August 1930	France; India	Ajmer	Heroic Virtues	Professed Priest, Franciscan Capuchins; Bishop of Ajmer; Founder, Prabhudasi Sisters of Ajmer – Handmaids of the Lord and the Mission Sisters of Ajmer
Vincenzo Cozzi	26 November 1926	3 July 2013	Italy	Melfi-Rapolla-Venosa	Heroic Virtues	Bishop of Melfi-Rapolla-Venosa
Cícero Romão Batista	24 March 1844	20 July 1934	Brazil	Crato	Heroic Virtues	Professed Priest

== 2021 ==
Name	Born	Died	Country	Diocese	Cause	Notes
Pilar Bellosillo García-Verde	22 December 1913	2 January 2003	Spain	Madrid	Heroic Virtues	Layperson; Member, World Union of Catholic Women's Organizations
Juan Sinforiano Bogarín González	21 August 1863	25 February 1949	Paraguay	Asunción	Heroic Virtues	Archbishop of Asunción
Clemencia Borja Taboada	25 September 1881	12 March 1963	Mexico	Querétaro	Heroic Virtues	Founder, Marian Missionary Sisters
Renzo Buricchi	1 March 1921	6 October 1983	Italy	Prato	Heroic Virtues	Married Layperson
Clare Crockett (religious name: Clare Maria of the Trinity and the Heart of Mary)	14 November 1982	16 April 2016	Ireland; Ecuador	Derry	Heroic Virtues	Professed Religious, Servant Sisters of the Home of the Mother
Joaquim Honório da Silveira	14 January 1879	1 November 1966	Brazil	Natal	Heroic Virtues	Diocesan Priest
Gilberto Maria Delfina	2 August 1925	5 December 2004	Brazil	Santo Amaro	Heroic Virtues	Priest and Founder, Fraternity of Jesus the Savior; Founder, Missionary Institute of the Servant Sisters of Jesus the Savior
Laureana Franco	4 July 1936	7 October 2011	Philippines	Pasig	Heroic Virtues	Layperson; Member, Legion of Mary
José Luis Gago del Val	4 July 1934	22 December 2012	Spain	Valladolid	Heroic Virtues	Professed Priest, Dominicans
Rhoel Gallardo	29 November 1965	3 May 2000	Philippines	Isabela	Martyr in odium fidei	Professed Priest, Claretians
Andraos Ghattas (religious name: Stéphanos II)	16 January 1920	20 January 2009	Egypt	Alexandria of the Copts	Heroic Virtues	Priest, Congregation of the Mission (Vincentians); Archeparch of Alexandria of the Copts; Cardinal
Wilhelm [Willi] Graf	2 January 1918	12 October 1943	Germany	Munich-Freising	Martyr in odium fidei	Young Layperson; Member, White Rose Resistance Movement
Giuseppe Merola (religious name: Egidio)	1 May 1906	6 January 2002	Italy	Nardò-Gallipoli	Heroic Virtues	Professed Priest, Franciscan Conventuals
José Alí Lebrún Moratinos	19 March 1919	21 February 2001	Venezuela	Caracas	Heroic Virtues	Archbishop of Caracas; Cardinal
Gabriel Wilhelminus Manek	18 August 1913	30 November 1989	Indonesia; United States	Larantuka	Heroic Virtues	Professed Priest, Society of the Divine Word; Archbishop of Endeh; Founder, Daughters of Our Lady Queen of the Holy Rosary
Alfons Mańka	21 October 1917	22 January 1941	Poland; Austria	Poznań	Martyr in odium fidei	Cleric, Missionary Oblates of Mary Immaculate
José Carlos Parra Pires	14 August 1954	20 April 1990	Brazil	Umuarama	Heroic Virtues	Diocesan Priest
Pier Luigi Quatrini	11 July 1968	27 November 2005	Italy	Civita Castellana	Heroic Virtues	Diocesan Priest
Vittoria Razzetti	27 January 1834	22 February 1912	Italy	Brescia	Heroic Virtues	Layperson
Rita Antoinette Rizzo (religious name: Mary Angelica of the Annunciation)	20 April 1923	27 March 2016	United States	Birmingham (Alabama)	Heroic Virtues	Professed Religious, Poor Clares of Perpetual Adoration; Founder, Franciscan Missionaries of the Eternal Word and Knights of the Holy Eucharist
Giuseppe [Bepo] Vavassori	19 July 1888	5 February 1975	Italy	Bergamo	Heroic Virtues	Diocesan Priest
Toussaint Vayssière (religious name: Marie-Étienne)	29 October 1864	14 September 1940	France	Marseille	Heroic Virtues	Professed Priest, Dominicans

== 2020 ==
Name	Born	Died	Country	Diocese	Cause	Notes
Ghazaros Agagianian [Krikor Bedros XV]	September 18, 1895	May 26, 1971	Georgia; Italy	Rome	Heroic Virtues	Cardinal; Patriarch of the Armenian Catholic Church
Léo Tarcísio Gonçalves Pereira	October 9, 1961	January 4, 2007	Brazil	Florianópolis	Heroic Virtues	Professed Priest, Dehonians, Founder, "Bethany Community"
Ellen Aurora Sundström Ammann	July 1, 1870	November 23, 1932	Sweden; Germany	Munich–Freising	Heroic Virtues	Married Layperson; Founder, German Catholic Women's Association
Giuseppe Aveni	December 5, 1918	July 24, 2010	Italy; Philippines	Parañaque	Heroic Virtues	Professed Priest, Rogationists of the Heart of Jesus
Daniela Benedetti Spadoni	October 27, 1966	February 28, 1994	Italy	Pescia	Heroic Virtues	Married Layperson
Giancarlo Bertozzi	February 28, 1929	October 17, 2011	Italy	Cesena-Sarsina	Heroic Virtues	Diocesan Priest
Mariano Campo	September 23, 1892	January 29, 1977	Italy	Cefalù	Heroic Virtues	Diocesan Priest
Flavius Aurelius Magnus Cassiodorus	ca. 490	ca. 583	Italy	Catanzaro-Squillace	Confirmation of Cultus	Layperson; Founder, Monasteries of Vivarium and Montecastello
Ettore Cunial	August 13, 1933	October 8, 2001	Italy; Albania	Tiranë-Durrës	Heroic Virtues	Professed Priest, Josephites of Murialdo
Francesco II di Borbone	January 16, 1836	December 27, 1894	Italy	Naples	Heroic Virtues	Married Layperson; King of Two Sicilies
María del Rosario Granados Martín de Cantos	April 25, 1839	September 23, 1921	Spain	Granada	Heroic Virtues	Married Layperson
Constance Estelle Faguette	September 12, 1843	August 23, 1929	France	Bourges	Heroic Virtues	Layperson
Leopold Figl	October 2, 1902	May 9, 1965	Austria	Sankt Pölten	Heroic Virtues	Married Layperson
Damiano Fucci (Modestino of Pietrelcina)	April 17, 1917	August 14, 2011	Italy	Manfredonia-Vieste-San Giovanni Rotondo	Heroic Virtues	Professed Priest, Franciscan Capuchins
Nicolaas Kluiters	May 25, 1940	March 14, 1985	Netherlands; Lebanon	Beirut	Martyr in odium fidei	Professed Priest, Jesuits
Antonio Machì (Gabriele [Gabriel] of Frazzanò)	June 7, 1907	April 17, 1973	Italy; Brazil	Uberaba	Heroic Virtues	Professed Priest, Franciscan Capuchins
Shreveport Martyrs: Isidore Quémerais; Jean Pierre; Jean-Marie Biler; Louis-Marie Gergaud; François Le Vézouët	September 9, 1847; September 29, 1831; November 18, 1839; March 22, 1832; August 10, 1833	September 15, 1873; September 16, 1873; September 26, 1873; October 1, 1873; October 8, 1873	France; United States	Shreveport	Offer of Life	Diocesan Priests
Giampaolo Mollo	November 5, 1941	September 1, 1998	Italy	Rome	Heroic Virtues	Married Permanent Deacon; Cofounder, Risen Jesus Community
Giampiero Morettini	December 10, 1977	August 21, 2014	Italy	Perugia-Città della Pieve	Heroic Virtues	Diocesan Seminarian
Guillermo Muzzio	February 25, 1972	November 1, 2002	Argentina	San Miguel (Argentina)	Heroic Virtues	Diocesan Seminarian
Consilio Pistocchi and Bruna Buratti Pistocchi	April 23, 1937; June 1, 1945	September 19, 2012; November 9, 2010	Italy	Cesena-Sarsina	Heroic Virtues	Permanent Deacon (Consilio Pistocchi); Married Couple
Tecla Relucenti (Tecla Maria of the Immaculate Conception)	September 23, 1704	July 11, 1769	Italy	Ascoli Piceno	Heroic Virtues	Founder, Pious Workers Sisters of the Immaculate Conception
Charlene Marie Richard	January 13, 1947	August 11, 1959	United States	Lafayette (Louisiana)	Heroic Virtues	Child
Alfonso Russo	October 26, 1943	February 22, 2013	Italy	Nocera Inferiore-Sarno	Heroic Virtues	Layperson; Founder, Pious Union of the Sick of Christ Our Salvation and Pious Disciples of the Cross
Raffaele Scauda	November 15, 1872	June 2, 1961	Italy	Naples	Heroic Virtues	Diocesan Priest
Tomás Vaquero	March 26, 1914	August 2, 1992	Brazil	São João da Boa Vista	Heroic Virtues	Bishop of São João da Boa Vista
Karol Wojtyła and Emilia Kaczorowska Wojtyła	January 18, 1879; March 26, 1884	February 18, 1941; April 3, 1929	Poland	Kraków	Heroic Virtues	Married Couple

== 2019 ==
Name	Born	Died	Country	Diocese	Cause	Notes
Laura Aguirre Hilla	February 23, 1901	December 31, 1986	Spain	Málaga	Heroic Virtues	Layperson
Miguel Afonso de Andrade Leite	September 29, 1912	September 30, 1976	Brazil	São João del Rei	Heroic Virtues	Professed Priest
María Josefa Camila del Carmen Álvarez Salas (Clara of the Heart of Mary)	July 14, 1860	February 25, 1924	Peru	Lima	Heroic Virtues	Founder, Franciscan Sisters of the Immaculate Conception
Wanda Błeńska	October 30, 1911	November 27, 2014	Poland	Poznań	Heroic Virtues	Layperson
Luigi Bolla (Yànkuam' Jìntia)	August 11, 1932	February 6, 2013	Italy; Peru	Lima	Heroic Virtues	Professed Priest, Salesians of Don Bosco
John Randal Bradburne	June 14, 1921	September 2, 1979	United Kingdom; Zimbabwe	Harare	Martyr in odium fidei	Layperson; Member, Secular Franciscans
Marcelo Henrique Câmara	June 28, 1979	March 3, 2008	Brazil	Florianópolis	Heroic Virtues	Layperson; Member, Opus Dei Movement
Francesc Cantarellas Ballester	August 15, 1884	April 22, 1968	Spain	Majorca	Heroic Virtues	Professed Priest, Augustinians
Anne-Gabrielle Caron	January 29, 2002	July 23, 2010	France	Fréjus-Toulon	Heroic Virtues	Child
Angelo Carù (Possidio of Jesus Crucified)	February 17, 1925	May 23, 1995	Italy; Brazil	Palmas-Francisco Beltrão	Heroic Virtues	Professed Priest, Discalced Augustinians
Geoffrey Leonard Cheshire	September 7, 1917	July 31, 1992	United Kingdom	East Anglia	Heroic Virtues	Married Layperson
Nerino Cobianchi	June 25, 1945	January 3, 1998	Italy	Vigevano	Heroic Virtues	Layperson
Ozsvári Csaba	July 25, 1963	July 9, 2009	Hungary	Veszprém	Heroic Virtues	Married Layperson; Member, Schönstatt Movement
María Claudia Josefa de Astorga Liceras (María del Socorro)	October 30, 1769	March 31, 1814	Spain	Málaga	Heroic Virtues	Professed Religious, Minim Nuns
Maria Antonia Destro (Maria Ciro)	March 11, 1782	July 24, 1818	Italy	Monreale	Heroic Virtues	Professed Religious, Poor Clare Nuns
George Fernandes	April 23, 1903	June 2, 1970	India	Bombay	Heroic Virtues	Diocesan Priest; Founder, Poor Sisters of Our Lady
Jerome Maria Fernandez [ജെറോം ഫെർണാണ്ടസ്]	September 8, 1901	February 26, 1992	India	Quilon	Heroic Virtues	Bishop of Quilon
José Atiliano Franco Arita	October 6, 1950	June 21, 1990	Honduras	Santa Rosa de Copán	Martyr in odium fidei	Married Layperson
Silvio Galli	September 10, 1972	June 12, 2012	Italy	Brescia	Heroic Virtues	Professed Priest, Salesians of Don Bosco
Cesáreo Gil Atrio	May 14, 1922	October 14, 1997	Spain; Venezuela	Caracas	Heroic Virtues	Priest, Diocesan Laborer Priests of the Sacred Heart of Jesus
Nazzareno Gauci (Grazzja)	February 9, 1911	February 8, 2005	Malta	Gozo	Heroic Virtues	Professed Priest, Augustinians
Valeriano Güemes Rodríguez	September 12, 1890	December 12, 1978	Spain; India	Berhampur	Heroic Virtues	Priest, Congregation of the Mission (Vincentians)
Irving Charles Houle [Francis]	December 27, 1925	January 3, 2009	United States	Marquette	Heroic Virtues	Married Layperson
Daniel George Hyams and Domitilla Rota Hyams	June 1, 1921; May 7, 1918	December 28, 2012; January 18, 2011	South Africa; Italy	Johannesburg	Heroic Virtues	Married Layperson; Founders, Little Edeen Society
Eliáš Iglódi (Štefan) [Iglódi Illés (István)]	c. 1621	November 6, 1639	Hungary; Slovakia	Košice	Martyr in odium fidei	Professed Priest, Franciscan Conventuals
Adolf Karel Kajpr	July 5, 1902	September 17, 1959	Czech Republic; Slovakia	Prague	Martyr ex aerumnis carceris	Professed Priest, Jesuits
Joseph Kandathil Warkey [Thomas Kandathil]	October 27, 1904	December 12, 1991	India	Ernamkulam-Angamaly (Syro-Malabarese)	Heroic Virtues	Diocesan Priest; Founder, Assisi Sisters of Mary Immaculate
Varkey Kattarath	October 31, 1851	October 24, 1931	India	Kottayam (Syro-Malabarese)	Heroic Virtues	Founder, Vincentian Congregation
Henryk Kubik (Leander)	January 4, 1909	October 14, 1942	Poland	Legnica	Martyr in odium fidei	Professed Priest, Benedictines (Annunciation Congregation)
Waldir Lopes de Castro	February 20, 1931	December 22, 2001	Brazil	Sobral	Heroic Virtues	Diocesan Priest
Armond Madhavath [ആര്മണ്ട് മാധവത്ത്] (Armond of Nadavayal)	November 25, 1930	January 12, 2001	India	Tellicherry (Syro-Malabarese)	Heroic Virtues	Professed Priest, Franciscan Capuchins
Rosetta Marchese	October 20, 1922	March 8, 1984	Italy	Rome	Heroic Virtues	Professed Religious, Daughters of Mary, Help of Christians (Salesian Sisters)
Giovanni Mazzucco (Dionisio of Silvano d'Orba)	March 8, 1907	January 8, 1990	Italy	La Spezia-Sarzana-Brugnato	Heroic Virtues	Professed Priest, Franciscan Capuchins
Aldo Michisanti and Enrica Onorante Michisanti	December 1, 1937; November 19, 1945	March 3, 1997; January 25, 2007	Italy	Rome	Heroic Virtues	Married Couple
John Peter Savarinayagam [ஜான் பீட்டர் கப்புச்சின்] (John Peter of Thiruppoonthuruthi)	May 29, 1941	March 2, 1979	India	Kumbakonam	Heroic Virtues	Professed Priest, Franciscan Capuchins

== 2018 ==
=== October 2018 ===
- Paola Adamo (1963-1978), Child of the Archdiocese of Taranto (Italy)
- Ibrahim Addai Scher (d. 1918) and 27 Companion Martyrs of the Assyrian genocide, Archeparchs, Eparchs, Priests, Catechumens, and Laypersons of the Archeparchy of Urmia; Priests of the Congregation of the Mission (Vincentians); Martyrs (Iraq-Iran)
- Pierangelo Capuzzimati (1990-2008), Young Layperson of the Archdiocese of Taranto (Italy)
- Amanda Gilseth Ruiz Suarez [Amandita] (1999-2005), Child of the Archdiocese of San Cristobal de Venezuela (Venezuela)
- Marian Zelazek (1918-2006), Professed Priest of the Society of the Divine Word (Poland-India)

=== September 2018 ===
- Domenica Crocifissa Lolli [Nina] (1901-2006), Layperson of the Archdiocese of Brindisi-Ostuni (Italy)
- Giovanni Antonio Rabbi (1693-1785), Priest of the Diocese of Bergamo (Italy)

=== July 2018 ===
- Pedro Arrupe Gondra (1909-1991), Professed Priest of the Jesuits (Spain-Italy)
- Kazimierz Stanisław Badeni (Joachim) (1912-2010), Professed Priest of the Dominicans (Belgium-Poland)
- Agostino Bartolini (1918-2012), Professed Priest of the Carmelites of the Ancient Observance (Italy)
- Elia Carbonaro (1893-1973), Professed Priest of the Carmelites of the Ancient Observance (Italy)
- Amata Cerretelli (1907-1963), Layperson of the Archdiocese of Florence; Member of the Secular Carmelites (Italy)
- Maddalena Fezza (1811-1877), Layperson of the Diocese of Nocera Inferiore-Sarno (Italy)
- Alfonso María López Sendín (1906-2002), Professed Priest of the Carmelites of the Ancient Observance (Spain)
- Domingos Evangelista Pinheiro (1843-1924), Priest of the Archdiocese of Belo Horizonte; Founder of the Sisters Helpers of Our Lady of Pieta (Brazil)
- Walenty Torbiński (Gwala) (1908-1999), Professed Priest of the Dominicans (Poland)
- Philomena Vallayil (Mary Francesca de Chantal) (1880-1972), Founder of the Sisters of Adoration of the Blessed Sacrament (India)

=== June 2018 ===
- Luigi Pedrollo (1888-1986), Professed Priest of the Poor Servants of Divine Providence (Calabrians) (Italy)

=== May 2018 ===
- Thea Bowman (1937-1990, Black Catholic religious sister with the Franciscan Sisters of Perpetual Adoration, educator, and activist (United States)

=== April 2018 ===
- Salvador García Pintos (1891-1956), Married Layperson of the Archdiocese of Montevideo (Uruguay)
- Annunziata Addolorata Lafranco (Teresa) (1920-1989), Professed Religious of the Daughters of Saint Mary of Leuca (Italy)
- Annakkutty Payyappilly (Mary Celine) (1906-1993), Professed Religious of the Congregation of the Mother of Carmel (India)

=== March 2018 ===
- Enrichetta Beltrame Quattrocchi (1914-2012), Layperson of the Vicariate of Rome (Italy)
- Chiara Corbella Petrillo (1984-2012), Young Married Layperson of the Vicariate of Rome (Italy)
- João dal Monte (Inácio of Ribeirão Preto) (1897-1963), Professed Priest of the Franciscan Capuchins; Bishop of Guaxupé (Brazil)
- Pietrino di Natale (1966-1984), Young Layperson of the Diocese of Teramo-Atri (Italy)
- Diego Gutierréz Pedraza (1894-1990), Professed Priest of the Augustinians; Bishop of Cafayate (Spain)
- Stefano Lamera (1912-1997), Professed Priest of the Society of Saint Paul (Paulines) (Italy)
- Salustiano Míguelez Romero (1919-1999), Professed Priest of the Augustinians (Spain)
- Cecilia Moshe Hanna (1931-2002), Professed Religious of the Daughters of the Sacred Heart of Jesus (Chaldeans); Martyr (Iraq)
- Cesare Sarafini (Michelangelo of Cingoli) (1908-2013), Professed Priest of the Franciscan Capuchins (Italy-Brazil)
- Avhustyn-Klement Tsebrovs'kyi (1888-1944), Married Priest of the Archeparchy of Lviv of the Ukrainians (Ukraine)

=== February 2018 ===
- Ragheed Aziz Ganni (1972-2007), Basman Yousef Daud Al-Yousef (1982-2007), Wahid Hanna Isho (1966-2007), and Gassan Isam Bidawed (1983-2007), Priest and Subdeacons of the Archeparchy of Mosul of the Chaldeans; Martyrs (Iraq)
- Roman Kotlarz (1928-1976), Priest of the Diocese of Radom; Martyr (Poland)

=== January 2018 ===
- Antoni Baraniak (1904‍–‍1977), Professed Priest of the Salesians of Don Bosco; Archbishop of Poznan (Poland)
- Aloysius Maria Benziger (Aloysius of Saint Mary) (1864‍–‍1942), Professed Priest of the Discalced Carmelites; Bishop of Quilon (Switzerland-India)
- Julianus Buyck (Adeodatus of Saint Peter) (1896‍–‍1968), Professed Priest of the Discalced Carmelites (Belgium-India)
- Florencia Cuesta Valluerca (Trinidad of the Sacred Heart of Jesus) (1904-1967), Professed Religious of the Carmelite Nuns of the Ancient Observance (Spain-Philippines)
- Giacobo Gratij [Jacobo de Gracia] (1517‍–‍1619), Priest of the Archdiocese of Madrid (Italy-Spain)
- Hernando de Talavera (ca. 1430‍–‍1507), Professed Priest of the Hieronymites; Archbishop of Granada (Spain)

== 2017 ==
=== December 2017 ===
- Angelo Frosi (1924-1995), Professed Priest of the Xaverian Missionaries; Bishop of Abaetetuba (Italy-Brazil)
- Antonia Luzmila Rivas López (María Augustina) (1920-1990), Professed Religious of the Religious of the Good Shepherd; Martyr (Peru)
- Fritz Michael Gerlich (1861–1934), Married Layperson of the Archdiocese of Munich-Freising; Martyr (Poland-Germany)
- Mercedes Reyes Sánchez (Mercedes of Saint Therese) (1930-2012), Professed Religious of the Discalced Carmelite Nuns (Colombia)
- Romano Guardini (1885–1968), Priest of the Archdiocese of Munich-Freising (Italy-Germany)

=== October 2017 ===
- Ana María Moreno Castillo [Niña Anita] (1887-1977), Layperson of the Diocese of Chitré (Panama)
- Isabelle Abdullah El-Khoury (1878-1953), Founder and Renovator of the Antonine Sisters (Beirut, Lebanon)

=== September 2017 ===
- Edda Roda (Adalberta of the Holy Trinity) (1940-1996), Professed Religious of the Capuchin Sisters of Mother Rubatto (Italy)
- Ivan Veliamyn Rutskyi (1571-1637), Archeparch of Kiev; Restorer of the Basilians of Saint Josaphat (Belarus-Ukraine)

=== August 2017 ===
- Adalberto Almeida Merino (1916-2008), Archbishop of Chihuahua (Mexico)
- Richard Michael Fernando (Richie) (1970-1996), Professed Cleric of the Jesuits; Martyr (Philippines-Cambodia)

=== July 2017 ===
- Élise Bisschop (1925-1964), Layperson of the Diocese of Sens-Auxerre (France)
- Moisés Cisneros Rodríguez (1945-1991), Professed Religious of the Marist Brothers of the Schools; Martyr (Spain-Guatemala)
- Enrique Esteve Francisco (Enrique Maria) (1905-1990), Professed Priest of the Carmelites of Ancient Observance (Spain)
- Marie-Melanie [Marie-Noëlle] Rouget (1883-1967), Layperson of the Diocese of Sens-Auxerre (France)

=== June 2017 ===
- Bruno Cornacchiola (1913-2001), Married Layperson of the Vicariate of Rome; Founder of the Association of the Ardent Hosts of Christ Immortal King (Italy)
- Anna Figus (Anna of Jesus) (1900-1995), Founder of the Sisters of Redemption (Italy)
- Wilhelm Gaczel and 3 Companions (d. 1941–42), Professed Priests and Religious of the Augustinians; Martyrs (Poland-Germany)
- Fernando González Saborío (1927-1957), Priest of the Diocese of Tilaran-Liberia (Costa Rica)
- Michael Power (1804-1847), Bishop of Toronto (Canada)
- Ramón Sáinz Orozco (1882-1937), Married Layperson of the Diocese of San Juan de los Lagos; Martyr (Mexico)

=== May 2017 ===
- María Isabel [Marisa] Acuña Arias (1941-1954), Child of the Archdiocese of San Jose de Costa Rica (Costa Rica)
- Giovanni Antonio Baldeschi (1780-1840), Priest of the Vicariate of Rome; Cofounder of the Sisters of Perpetual Adoration (Italy)
- Alma Sacco Ferrara (1914-2000), Married Layperson of the Vicariate of Rome (Italy)
- Lucio Leon Cardenas (1913-2010), Married Layperson of the Archdiocese of San Cristobal de Venezuela (Venezuela)
- Juan Morrera Coll (Casiano María of Madrid) (1892-1965), Professed Priest of the Franciscan Capuchins (Spain-Costa Rica)
- Bernhard Poether (1906-1942), Priest of the Diocese of Munster; Martyr (Germany)
- Victor Manuel Sanabria Martínez (1898-1952), Archbishop of San Jose de Costa Rica (Costa Rica)

=== April 2017 ===
- Élisabeth Philippine Marie Hélène de France (1764–1794), Layperson of the Archdiocese of Paris; Martyr (France)
- Annammal Selvanayagam Pillai (1836–1883), Founder of the Sisters of Saint Anne of Tiruchirappalli (India)
- Palmira (Maria Anselma) Viola (1892-1983), Founder of the Missionary Catechist Sisters of Jesus the Redeemer (Italy)

=== March 2017 ===
- Wilhelm Frede (1875–1942), Married Layperson of the Diocese of Munster; Martyr (Germany)
- Maria Lilia Mastacchini (1892–1926), Founder of the Institute of Pious Workers (Italy)
- Beniamino Miori (1883–1946), Professed Priest of the Stigmatines (Italy)
- José María Pujadas Ferrer (1915–1984), Priest of the Archdiocese of Barcelona; Founder of the Encounters of Youth Promotion (Spain)
- Victor Rodriguez Martinez (1925–2012), Married Layperson of the Archdiocese of Valladolid; Member of the Lay Carmelites (Spain)
- Pedro Manuel Salado de Alba (1968–2012), Layperson of the Diocese of Esmeraldas; Member of the Ecclesial Family "Hogar de Nazaret" (Spain-Ecuador)
- Colette Lamontagne Samson (1923–1991), Married Layperson of the Archdiocese of Quebec (Canada)

== 2016 ==
=== December 2016 ===
- Alicja Poppe (Maria Yelisaveta) (1884–1970), Cofounder of the Sisters of Charity of Saint Vincent de Paul (Greek Catholic) (Belgium-Ukraine)
- Peter John Roche (Alfred of Moodahadu) (1924–1996), Professed Priest of the Franciscan Capuchins (India)
- Laura Vincenzi (1963–1987), Young Layperson of the Archdiocese of Ferraro-Comacchio (Italy)
- Rhoda Greer Wise (1888-1948), Married Layperson of the Diocese of Youngstown (United States)

=== November 2016 ===
- Mario Bortoletto (1938–2009), Priest of the Diocese of Treviso; Fidei Donum Missionary in the Diocese of Ebolowa; Associate of the Pontifical Institute for Foreign Missions (Italy-Cameroon)
- Léontine Dolivet (1888–1974), Layperson of the Archdiocese of Lyon (France)
- Antonio Loi (1936–1965), Priest of the Archdiocese of Cagliari (Italy)
- Inôcencio López Santamaria (1874–1958), Professed Priest of the Mercedarians; Bishop of Sao Raimundo Nonato (Spain-Brazil)
- Domenico Antonio Mangano (1916–2001), Married Layperson of the Diocese of Albano; member of the Volunteers of God – Focolare Movement (Italy)

=== October 2016 ===
- Luisa Mabalane Mafo (1943–1992) and 22 Lay Companions from the Catechetical Center of Guiua (d. 1992), Married Catechists, Catechumens, Young Laypersons and Children of the Diocese of Imhanbane; Martyrs (Mozambique)
- Carmen Nebot Soldán de Noguera (1933–2007), Married Layperson of the Diocese of Huelva (Spain)
- Joaquín Reina Castrillón (1902–1975), Professed Priest of the Jesuits; Founder of the Servants of the Poor, Daughters of the Sacred Heart of Jesus (Spain)

=== September 2016 ===
- Celso Benigno Luigi Costantini (1876–1958), Titular Archbishop of Theodosiopolis in Arcadia; Founder of the Congregation of the Disciples of the Lord; Cardinal (Italy)
- Jacques Hamel (1930–2016), Priest of the Archdiocese of Rouen; Martyr (France)
- Rudolf Lunkenbein (1939–1976), Professed Priest of the Salesians of Don Bosco; Martyr (Germany-Brazil)
- Simão Cristino Koge Kudugodu [Simão Bororó] (1937–1976), Layperson of the Diocese of Barra do Garcas; Martyr (Brazil)
- Laura Pérez Sénchez (1928-1966), Professed Member of the Secular Institute of the Apostolic Missionaries of Charity (Spain)
- Sergio Sorgon (Sergio of Saint Joseph) (1938–1985), Professed Priest of the Discalced Carmelites (Italy-Madagascar)

=== August 2016 ===
- Vitória Nabo Correia Bixarxe (Vitória of the Incarnation) (1661–1715), Professed Religious of the Poor Clare Nuns (Brazil)
- Nicholas Black Elk (1863–1950), Married Layperson of the Diocese of Rapid City; Catechist (United States)
- Kazimierz Antoni Hołoga (1913–1958), Married Layperson of the Archdiocese of Poznań (Poland)
- Mary Bernadette Prasad Kispotta (1878–1961), Founder of the Daughters of Saint Anne of Ranchi (India)
- Louis-Marie Leveil (1889–1973), Professed Priest of the Jesuits (France-India)
- Elisa Martinez (1905–1991), Founder of the Daughters of Saint Mary of Leuca (Italy)
- Othon Motta (1913–1985), Bishop of Campanha (Brazil)

=== July 2016 ===
- Giuseppe Mazzanti (1879–1954), Priest of the Diocese of Imola; Founder of the Little Sisters of Saint Therese of the Child Jesus (Italy)
- Maria von Mörl (1790–1868), Layperson of the Diocese of Bolzano-Bressanone; Member of the Secular Franciscans (Italy)
- Gaetana [Agata Tanina] Nastasi (1914 0 1926), Child of the Diocese of Acireale (Italy)
- Jorge Novak (1928–2001), Professed Priest of the Society of the Divine Word; Bishop of Quilmes (Argentina)
- Antonietta (Maria) Zanelli (1887–1957), Founder of the Little Sisters of Saint Therese of the Child Jesus (Italy)

=== June 2016 ===
- Bernardino de Antequera (1572-1634), Professed Priest of the Jesuits (Spain)
- Jose Cappel Farfsing [Joseph Henry Cappel] (1908–2004), Priest of the Maryknoll Missionary Society (United States-Chile)
- Margarita Fonseca Silvestre (1884–1945), Founder of the Servants of Christ the Priest (Colombia)
- Patrick Ryan (1845–1878), Priest of the Diocese of Knoxville (Ireland-United States)

=== May 2016 ===
- Ivan Burik (1928–1991), Priest of the Archdiocese of Đakovo-Osijek; Martyr (Serbia-Croatia)
- Federico [Friedrich] Grote (1853–1940), Professed Priest of the Redemptorists (Germany-Argentina)
- Teresa Kearney (Mary Kevin) (1875–1957), Founder of the Little Sisters of Saint Francis and the Franciscan Missionary Sisters for Africa (Ireland-Uganda-United States)
- Manuel (prob. 1604–1686), Layperson of the Archdiocese of Mercedes-Luján (Angola-Argentina)
- Joseph Müller (1894–1944), Priest of the Diocese of Hildesheim; Martyr (Germany)
- Christophe Munzihirwa Mwene Ngabo (1926–1996), Professed Priest of the Jesuits; Archbishop of Bukavu (Democratic Republic of Congo)
- Helena Perera [Charithaya] (ca. 1848–1931), Layperson of the Diocese of Chilaw (Sri Lanka)
- Jorge Maria [Georges] Salvaire (1847–1899), Priest of the Congregation of the Mission (Vincentians) (France-Argentina)
- Lourdu Xavier Savarirayan (1910–1972), Priest of the Diocese of Kumbakonam (India)
- Ivan [Ivica] Simrak (1912–1944), Priest of the Eparchy of Križevci; Martyr (Croatia)
- Mónika Tímár [Schmidt] (1937–1962), Professed Religious of the Cistercian Nuns (Hungary)

=== April 2016 ===
- Jeremy Joyner White (1938–1990), Layperson of the Personal Prelature of the Holy Cross and Opus Dei (United Kingdom-Nigeria)
- Czeslawa Wojtczak (Maria Wlodzimira) (1909–1943), Professed Religious of the Sisters of Saint Elizabeth (Poland)

=== March 2016 ===
- Alonzo de Barzana (ca. 1530–1597), Professed Priest of the Jesuits (Spain-Peru)
- Clement Shahbaz Bhatti (1968–2011), Married Layperson of the Archdiocese of Islamabad-Rawalpindi; Martyr (Pakistan)
- Louis Camilleri (1923–2011), Professed Religious of the Brothers of the Christian Schools (De La Salle Brothers) (Malta)
- María Eugenia González Lafón (María Eugenia of the Holy Trinity) (1876–1962), Founder of the Catechist Sisters of Mary Most Holy, Order of Saint Benedict (Mexico)

=== February 2016 ===
- Andrea Aziani [Andres Aziani Samek-Lodovici] (1953–2008), Layperson of the Diocese of Carabayllo; Member of the Memores Domini Lay Association (Italy-Peru)
- Magdalena Mortęska (ca. 1554–1631), Professed Religious of the Benedictine Nuns (Poland)
- Teresa Tambelli (1884–1964), Vowed Member of the Daughters of Charity of Saint Vincent de Paul (Italy)

=== January 2016 ===
- Thayr Saidālla Abdāl and 44 Companions (d. 2010), Priests and Layfaithful of the Archeparchy of Baghdad and Beirut of the Syrians; Martyrs (Iraq)
- Bernard Digal and 6 Lay Companions (d. 2008), Priest and Laypeople of the Archdiocese of Cuttack-Bhubaneswar; Martyrs (India)
- Ante Gabrić (1915–1988), Professed Priest of the Jesuits (Croatia-India)
- Carmela (Pura) Pagani (1914–2001), Professed Religious of the Little Sisters of the Holy Family (Italy)
- Francesco Palliola [Paleola] (1612–1648), Professed Priest of the Jesuits; Martyr (Italy-Philippines)

== 2015 ==
=== December 2015 ===
- Sante (Pellegrino) Boni (1898–1990), Professed Priest of the Franciscan Friars Minor (Italy)
- Italo Calabró (1925–1990), Priest of the Archdiocese of Reggio Calabria-Bova (Italy)
- Luigi [Luis] Cecchin (1924–2010), Priest of the Diocese of Treviso; Fidei Donum Missionary in the Diocese of Nazare (Italy)
- Ira Barnes Dutton (Joseph) (1843–1931), Layperson of the Diocese of Honolulu; Member of the Secular Franciscans (United States)
- Matteo Farina (1990–2009), Young Layperson of the Archdiocese of Brindisi-Ostuni (Italy)
- Rafila Gălut (1910-1939), Layperson of the Eparchy of Lugoj (Romania)
- Aloÿs Kobès (1820–1872), Professed Priest of the Congregation of the Holy Spirit (Spiritians); Apostolic Vicar of Senegambia; Founder of the Daughters of the Holy Heart of Mary and the Brothers of Saint Joseph (France-Senegal)
- Edvard Vajnilovič [Edward Woynillowicz] (1847–1928), Married Layperson of the Archdiocese of Minsk-Mohilev (Belarus-Poland)
- George Willmann (1920–1977), Professed Priest of the Jesuits (United States-Philippines)

=== November 2015 ===
- William Edward Bill Atkinson (1946–2006), Professed Religious of the Augustinians (United States)
- André Bortolameotti (1919–2010), Professed Priest of the Congregation of Jesus the Priest (Italy-Brazil)
- Maria Josefa Brandis (Leopoldina) (1815–1900), Vowed Member of the Daughters of Charity of Saint Vincent de Paul; Founder of the Marian Sisters of the Miraculous Medal (Austria)
- Alberto Ferri Garavelli (1935–2009), Professed Priest of the Comboni Missionaries of the Sacred Heart (Italy)

=== October 2015 ===
- Henry II the Pious [Henryk II Pobozny] (ca. 1196–1241), Married Layperson of the Diocese of Legnica (Poland)
- Charles Journet (1891–1975), Titular Bishop of Furnos Minor; Cardinal (Switzerland)
- Ange Le Proust (1624–1697), Professed Priest of the Augustinians; Founder of the Sisters of Saint Thomas of Villanueva (France)
- Giovanni Vaccari (1913–1971), Professed Religious of the Servants of Charity (Guanellians) (Italy-Spain)

=== September 2015 ===
- Floribert Bwana Chui bin Kositi (1981–2007), Layperson of the Archdiocese of Goma; Member of the Saint Egidio Community; Martyr (Democratic Republic of Congo)
- Martyrs of "La Florida" Missions (d. 1549–1706), Professed Priest and Religious' of the Dominicans; Franciscans, Augustinians and Jesuits; Pilgrim and Native Laypeople of and from the Dioceses of Pensacola-Tallahassee and Saint Augustine; Martyrs (Spain, Italy, Mexico, and United States)
- Luis de Cancer (1500–1549), Professed Priest of the Dominicans; Martyr (Spain-United States)
- Isidoro Meschi (1945–1991), Priest of the Archdiocese of Milan (Italy)
- Bernardo de Monroy and 2 Trinitarian Companions (d. 1613–1622), Professed Priest of the Trinitarians; Martyrs (Spain-Algeria)

=== May 2015 ===
- Mikiel Azzopardi (1910–1987), Priest of the Archdiocese of Malta (Malta)
- Benedicto Teodoro Barbero Bermejo and 18 Companions (d. 1936), Priests from the Diocese of Plasencia; Martyrs (Spain)
- Eugen Bolz (1881-1945), Married Layperson of the Diocese of Rottenberg-Stuttgart; Martyr (Tübingen - Berlin, Germany)
- Joseph Chhmar Salas (1937–1977) and 34 Companions (d. 1971–78), Bishop of Phnom Penh; Priests of the Paris Foreign Mission Society and of the Dioceses from Cambodia along with lay companions from various Apostolic Vicariates (France, Vietnam, Cambodia)

=== April 2015 ===
- Alberto Fuger (1892–1970), Professed Priest of the Jesuits (France-Brazil)
- Francesca Lancellotti Zotta (1917–2008), Married Layperson of the Vicariate of Rome (Italy)
- Pietro Manghisi (1889–1953), Priest of the Pontifical Institute for Foreign Missions; Martyr (Italy-Myanmar)
- Declan O'Toole (1971–2002), Priest of the Mill Hill Missionaries; Martyr (Ireland-Uganda)
- Santo Perin (1917–1945), Priest of the Archdiocese of Ravenna-Cervia (Italy)

=== March 2015 ===
- Theresia Albers (1872–1949), Founder of the Sisters Witnesses of the Love of Christ (Germany)
- Giosuè dei Cas (1880–1932), Professed Religious of the Comboni Missionaries of the Heart of Jesus (Italy-South Sudan)
- Giuseppe Diana (1958–1994), Priest of the Diocese of Aversa; Martyr (Italy)
- Francisco Gíron Fernandez (1938–2009), Priest of the Diocese of Huelva (Spain)
- Anton Strle (1915–2003), Priest of the Archdiocese of Ljubljana (Slovenia)
- Adolfine Tönnies (Maria Michaele) (1862–1934), Cofounder of the Sisters Servants of the Holy Spirit of Perpetual Adoration (Germany-Netherlands)

=== February 2015 ===
- Eduardo Bonnín Aguiló (1917–2009), Layperson of the Diocese of Mallorca; Founder of the Cursillos in the Christianity Movement (Spain)
- Manuel Armindo de Lima and 3 Companions (d. 1982), Priest of the Missionary Society of the Good News; Laypersons of the Diocese of Viana; Postulant of the Mercedarian Sisters of Charity; Catechist (Italy-Angola)
- Francisco González Metola (1905–1967), Priest of the Diocese of Cadiz-Cueta (Spain)
- Pablo Muñoz Vega (1903–1994), Professed Priest of the Jesuits; Archbishop of Quito; Cardinal (Ecuador)

=== January 2015 ===
- Paolo Angelo Ballerini (1814–1897), Archbishop of Milan (Italy)
- Giuseppe Gabana (1904–1944), Priest of the Diocese of Brescia; Martyr (Italy)
- Jeanne Le Ber (1662–1714), Consecrated Layperson of the Archdiocese of Montreal (Canada)
- Marie-Léonie Martin (Francoise-Therese) (1863–1941), Professed Religious of the Visitation Nuns (France)
- Jesús Pla Gandía (1915–2000), Bishop of Siguenza-Guadalajara (Spain)
- Johann Georg Seidenbusch (1641–1729), Priest of the Oratorians (Germany)

== 2014 ==
=== December 2014 ===
- Hernán Alessandri Morandé (1935–2007), Professed Priest of the Secular Institute of the Schoenstatt Fathers (Chile)
- Miguel Cano Gutiérrez (1866–1924), Priest of the Archdiocese of Guadalajara; Founder of the Servants of the Holy Trinity and the Poor (Mexico)
- Joseph Verbis Lafleur (1912–1944), Priest of the Military Ordinate of the United States (United States-Philippines)
- Eduardo Laforet Dorda (1957–1984), Professed Member of the Secular Institute of the Crusaders of Mary (Spain)
- Stjepan Milanović (Lovro) (1777–1807), Professed Priest of the Franciscan Friars Minor (Bosnia-Herzegovina)
- Lewis Thomas (Paul James) Wattson (1863–1940), Founder and Professed Priest of the Franciscan Friars of the Antonement (United States)

=== November 2014 ===
- Ignace-Alexandre-Joseph Cardon and 4 Cistercian Companions (d. 1799), Professed Priests, Religious' and Cleric of the Cistercians (Congregation of Casamari); Martyrs (France-Italy)
- Maria Teresa Carloni (1919–1983), Layperson of the Archdiocese of Urbino-Urbania-Sant’Angelo in Vado (Italy)
- Eufemia of Racibórz (ca. 1299–1359), Professed Religious of the Dominican Nuns (Poland)
- Gabriel Gonsum Ganaka (1937–1999), Archbishop of Jos (Nigeria-United States)
- Enrico Smaldone (1914–1967), Priest of the Diocese of Nocera Inferiore-Sarno (Italy)
- Sebastian Lawrence Casimir Presentation Valiyathayil (1867–1936), Priest of the Diocese of Allepey; Founder of the Visitation Sisters of Allepey (India)
- Göbou Yaza (d. 1928?), Young Layperson of the Diocese of N’Zérékoré; Catechumen; Martyr (Guinea)

=== October 2014 ===
- Fortunata Evolo Nicolace (1938–2009), Married Layperson of the Diocese of Mileto-Nicotera-Tropea (Italy)
- Maria de Lourdes [Lourdinha] Benedicta Nogueira Fontão (1930–1988), Married Layperson of the Diocese of São João da Boa Vista (Brazil)
- Cármen Antunes de Matos Fortuna [Carmita] (1937–1980), Layperson of the Diocese of Setubal (Portugal)
- Teresa Militerni (1874–1925), Professed Religious of the Sisters of Saint John the Baptist (Italy)

=== September 2014 ===
- Jean-Baptiste Gerin (1797–1863), Priest of the Diocese of Grenoble-Vienne (France)
- Franziska May (Reinolda) (1901–1981), Professed Religious of the Missionary Benedictine Sisters of Tutzing (Germany-South Africa)
- Maria Cesira Pazzafini (Veronica) (1896–1964), Professed Religious of the Capuchin Nuns (Italy)
- Ida Peterfy (1922–2000), Founder of the Society Devoted to the Sacred Heart (Slovakia-United States)
- Adão Salgado Vaz de Faria (1907–1990), Priest of the Archdiocese of Braga; Founder of the Congregation of Divine Providence and the Holy Family (Portugal)

=== August 2014 ===
- Giuseppe Bracci (Giacinto) (1877–1967), Professed Priest of the Franciscan Friars Minor (Italy)
- Mario Gentili (1928–2006), Professed Religious of the Augustinians (Italy)
- Angelina Lo Dico (1900–1932), Layperson of the Diocese of Caltanisetta (Italy)
- Fermín Emilio Lobo (Antonio of Jesus) (1873–1942), Professed Priest of the Franciscan Friars Minor (Argentina); Cause officially opened since September 19, 1958 and re-opened in this month of August 2014.
- Amador Tajanlangit Sr. (1911–1977), Married Layperson of the Archdiocese of Jaro (Philippines)
- Reginaldo Toro (1830–1904), Professed Priest of the Dominicans; Bishop of Cordoba; Founder of the Dominican Tertiary Sisters of Saint Joseph (Argentina)

=== July 2014 ===
- Maria Cantamessa Gallo (1913–1995), Married Layperson of the Diocese of Asti (Italy)
- Heinrich König (1900–1942), Priest of the Archdiocese of Paderborn; Martyr (Germany)
- Rosa Maria Segale (Blandina) (1850–1941), Professed Religious of the Sisters of Charity of Cincinnati (Italy-United States)

=== June 2014 ===
- Cosimo Berlinsani (1619–1694), Professed Priest of the Cleric Regular of the Mother of God; Founder of the Oblate Sisters of the Child Jesus (Italy)
- Vincenzo Idà (1909-1984), Priest of the Diocese of Oppido Mamertina-Palmi; Founder of the Missionary Sisters of Catechism and the Missionaries of Evangelization (Italy-Mexico)
- Anna Moroni (1613–1675), Founder of the Oblate Sisters of the Child Jesus (Italy)

=== May 2014 ===
- Remigio Salazar Amador (1802–1857), Priest of the Diocese of Leon (Nicaragua)
- Silvio Pasquali (1864–1924), Priest of the Pontifical Institute for Foreign Missions; Founder of the Catechist Sisters of Saint Anne (Italy-India)
- Ouseph Thekkekara (Canisius of Saint Teresa) (1914–1998), Professed Priest of the Carmelites of Mary Immaculate (India)
- Guido Vidal França Schäffer (1974–2009), Seminarian of the Archdiocese of Sao Sebastiao do Rio de Janeiro (Brazil)

=== April 2014 ===
- Paulette Callabat (1923–2005), Consecrated Member of the Caritas Christi Secular Institute (France)
- Robert Naoussi (ca. 1940–1970), Layperson of the Archdiocese of Douala (Cameroon)
- Auguste [Nonco] Pelafigue (1888–1977), Layperson of the Diocese of Lafayette; Member of the Apostleship of Prayer League (France-United States)
- Antonio Rivera Ramírez (1916–1936), Young Layperson of the Archdiocese of Toledo (Spain); Cause officially opened since January 10, 1962 and re-opened on the month of April 2014.

=== March 2014 ===
- Rutilio Grande García (1928–1977), Professed Priest of the Jesuits; Martyr (El Salvador)
- Luise Löwenfels (Maria Aloysia) (1915–1942), Professed Religious of the Poor Handmaids of Jesus Christ; Martyr (Germany-Poland)
- Ascensión Sacramento Sánchez y Sánchez (1911–1946), Professed Member of the Secular Institute "Evangelical Crusade" (Spain)
- Maria Margaretha van Valkenisse (Maria Margaretha of the Angels) (1605-1758), Professed Religious of the Discalced Carmelite Nuns (Antwerp, Belgium - North Brabant, Netherlands)

=== February 2014 ===
- Nicoletta Giordano (Maria Petra) (1912–2006), Professed Religious of the Dominican Nuns (Italy)
- Martín Lawers González (1881–1933), Priest of the Diocese of Irapuato; Martyr (Mexico)

=== January 2014 ===
- Maria Borgato (1898–1945), Professed Member of the Secular Institute of the Company of Saint Ursula, Federation of the Secular Institute of Saint Angela Merici; Martyr (Italy-Germany)
- Joseph Leon Cardijn (1891–1967), Titular Archbishop of Tusuros; Cardinal; Founder of the Young Christian Workers (Jocists) (Belgium)
- Mariano Dubón Alonso (1861–1934), Priest of the Diocese of Leon (Nicaragua)
- Juan Luis Ellacuria Echevarría (Aloysius) (1905–1981), Professed Priest of the Claretians (Spain-United States)
- Julia Greeley (ca. 1833–48 – 1918), Layperson of the Archdiocese of Denver (United States)
- Julius Aemilius de Lombaerde (Júlio Maria) (1878–1944), Professed Priest of the Missionaries of the Holy Family; Founder of the Missionaries of Our Lady of the Most Blessed Sacrament, the Daughters of the Immaculate Heart of Mary and the Sisters of the Our Lady of the Most Blessed Sacrament (Belgium-Brazil)
- Cyprien [Sipiriyani] Rugamba (ca. 1935–1994) and Daphrose [Daforoza] Mukasanga (ca. 1944–1994) and 6 Companions, Married Couple, Young Laypeople and Children from the Archdiocese of Kigali; Members of the Emmanuel Community; Martyrs (Rwanda)

== 2013 ==
=== December 2013 ===
- Thatipatri Gnanamma (ca. 1822–1874), Widow; Founder of the Sisters of Saint Anne of Chennai and the Sisters of Saint Anne of Phirangipuram (India)
- Joaquín Carlos Paredes Pérez (Jesús of the Cross) (1911–1998), Professed Religious of the Franciscan Friars Minor (Argentina-Spain)
- Luigi Pera (1879–1952), Professed Priest of the Augustinians (Italy)
- Anna Bohuslava Tomanová (1904–1957), Layperson of the Diocese of Hradec Kralove (Czech Republic)
- Ioannes Baptista Yi Byeok and 132 Companions (d. 1785–1879), Laypeople from the Apostolic Vicariate of South Korea; Martyrs (S. Korea-N. Korea)

=== November 2013 ===
- Catherine De Bar (Mechtilde of the Blessed Sacrament) (1614–1698), Founder of the Benedictine Sisters of the Blessed Sacrament (France)
- George Vakayil [Vakayilachan] (1883–1931), Priest of the Archdiocese of Verapoly (India)
- Marianno Wachira and 26 Companions (d. 1952–1955), Laypeople from the Archdioceses of Nyeri and Nairobi along with the Dioceses of Murang’a and Meru; Catechumens; Professed Religious' of the Consolata Missionary Sisters and the Sisters of Mary Immaculate of Nyeri; Martyrs (Kenya-Italy)

=== October 2013 ===
- Marianna Fortunata Cherubini (Maria Giuseppa of the Sacred Heart) (1788–1844), Professed Religious of the Sisters of Perpetual Adoration (Italy); Cause opened in November 1844 and re-opened in October 2013
- Giuseppe Cinquina (1918–1945), Priest of the Diocese of Vasto-Chieti (Italy)
- Michael Jerome Cypher (1941–1975), Professed Priest of the Franciscan Conventuals; Martyr (United States-Honduras)
- Juan Ignacio Larrea Holguín (1927–2006), Priest of the Personal Prelature of the Holy Cross and Opus Dei; Archbishop of Guayaquil (Argentina-Ecuador)
- Felice Piccirilli (1912–1968), Priest of the Diocese of Vasto-Chieti (Italy)
- Adolfo Rodriguez Vidal (1920–2003), Priest of the Personal Prelature of the Holy Cross and Opus Dei; Bishop of Santa Maria de Los Ángeles (Spain-Chile)

=== September 2013 ===
- Nedjelko (Dominik) Barač (1912–1945), Professed Priest of the Dominicans; Martyr (Croatia)
- Henri [Benoit Thuân] Denis (1880–1933), Professed Priest of the Cistercians (Holy Family Congregation) (France-Vietnam)
- Teresa Grigolini (1853–1931), Professed Religious of the Comboni Missionary Sisters (Italy)

=== August 2013 ===
- Eugenio Romero Pose (1949–2007), Auxiliary Bishop of Madrid (Spain)

=== July 2013 ===
- Aloyse Gerber (Joseph-Marie of Eckbolsheim) (1907–1993), Professed Priest of the Franciscan Capuchins (France)

=== June 2013 ===
- Andrew Bertie (1929-2008), Layperson of the Vicariate of Rome; Prince and Grand Master of the Sovereign Military Order of Malta (United Kingdom-Italy)
- Antonio Campelo de Aragão (1904–1984), Professed Priest of the Salesians of Don Bosco; Bishop of Petrolina; Founder of the Sisters Mediators of Peace (Brazil)
- Peter Porekuu Dery (ca. 1918–2008), Archbishop of Tamale; Cardinal (Ghana)
- Chiara [Silvia] Lubich (1920-2008), Layperson of the Diocese of Frascati; Founder of the Focolare Movement (Italy)
- Carlo Noè (1878–1960), Priest of the Diocese of Treviso (Italy)

=== May 2013 ===
- Francisco Comabarros Sorribas (Tarcisio de Jesús) (1907–1989), Professed Religious of the Brothers of the Christian Schools (De La Salle Brothers) (Spain)
- Juan Pablo Góngora Alvarado (1894–1976), Priest of the Archdiocese of Yucatán; Founder of the Missionary Daughters of the Holy Mother of Light (Mexico)
- Joaquín Llorente Llorens (1893–1964), Married Layperson of the Diocese of Orihuela-Alizante (Spain)

=== March 2013 ===
- Mary Glowrey (Mary of the Sacred Heart) (1887-1957), Professed Religious of the Society of Jesus Mary Joseph (Australia-India)
- Ivan (Rafo) Kalinić (1910–1943), Professed Priest of the Franciscan Friars Minor; Martyr (Croatia)
- Franjo Kuharić (1919–2002), Archbishop of Zagreb; Cardinal (Croatia)
- Maria Zofia Szymanowska (1910–1983), Layperson of the Diocese of Kalisz (Ukraine-Poland)

=== February 2013 ===
- Carlo Acutis (1991-2006), Child of the Archdiocese of Milan (United Kingdom-Italy) (beatified on October 10, 2020)
- Marcelino Olaechea Loizago (1888–1972), Professed Priest of the Salesians of Don Bosco; Archbishop of Valencia (Spain)
- Julia Teresa Tallon (Mary Teresa) (1867-1954), Founder of the Parish Visitors of Mary Immaculate (United States)

=== January 2013 ===
- Ailbertus of Antoing (ca. 1060–1122), Professed Priest of the Canons Regular of Saint Augustine (Belgium-Germany)
- Benigna Cardoso da Silva (1928-1941), Child of the Diocese of Crato; Martyr (Ceará, Brazil) (to be beatified on 2020)

== See also ==
- List of people declared venerable by Pope Francis
- List of saints canonized by Pope Francis
- List of people beatified by Pope Francis
