= Hředle =

Hředle may refer to places in the Czech Republic:

- Hředle (Beroun District), a municipality and village in the Central Bohemian Region
- Hředle (Rakovník District), a municipality and village in the Central Bohemian Region
