= Adolf Kajpr =

Czech Catholic priest and publicist (1902–1959)

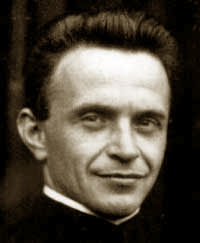
Adolf Kajpr

Adolf Kajpr SJ (5 July 1902, Hředle – 17 September 1959, Leopoldov) was a Czech Jesuit and publisher of Catholic printed matter. As an ardent preacher, confessor, spiritual leader and journalist, he commented not only on fundamental topics of the Catholic faith but also on current social and political issues. For his opinions he was imprisoned by the Nazis (1941–1945) and the communists (1950–1959). After nine years in the communist prison, he died at the age of 57 “with a reputation of holiness and martyrdom”.

== Life ==
=== Childhood and early years (1902–1927) ===
Adolf Kajpr was born on 5 July 1902 in Hředle. He was christened on 12 July 1902 in St Laurence Church in nearby Žebrák. His parents Adolf (1859–1906) and Anna (maiden name Kytková) (1861–1905) rented an inn and butcher’s in Hředle. When his mother died, his father returned with his sons to his native village of Bratronice, where he also died soon after. The orphaned boys were looked after by their good but strict Aunt Klára along with her husband Josef Brůžek. Adolf was brought up in the Christian faith. Between 1908 and 1916 he studied at primary school and but soon left due to financial difficulties at home. He worked as a day labourer, learned the cobbler’s trade and eventually became an apprentice in nearby Roučmíd’s mill. Yet showing an interest in his studies, he also prepared to study at secondary grammar school. From 1924 to 1926 he did military service in the Czechoslovak Army. Then at the age of 24 he was enrolled in Archiepiscopal Secondary Grammar School in Prague run by the Jesuits.

=== Joining the Society of Jesus (1928–1937) ===
After the sixth class, he joined the novitiate of the Society of Jesus, serving at Velehrad from 1928 to 1930. During this time, he also prepared for the school leaving exam, which he passed with honours. On 15 August 1930 he took the oaths of the order in Velehrad. Between 1930 and 1932 he studied philosophy in Egenhoven (now part of Leuven) in Belgium, and from 1932 to 1936 he studied theology in Innsbruck, Austria, where he was consecrated on 26 July 1935. Several days later he celebrated his first mass in St. Ignatius Church in Prague and All Saints Church in Bratronice. Immediately after the final exams he was sent to the third probation between 1936 and 1937 to Paray-le-Monial in France. After his formation was finished, he returned to his homeland.

=== Priesthood and press apostolate (1937–1941) ===
From 1937, Kajpr lived and worked in St Ignatius Church in Prague. He fulfilled his obligations to the community of the order, performed the duties of pastor and lead exercitations. He taught Christian philosophy at the Prague Archdiocese School of Theology (1940–41). His most influential activities were in the field of journalism, serving as the editor of four magazines of the order as well as offering his own contributions: Obrození (Revival) (1939–40), Dorost (The Youth) (1939–40), Nové směry (New Directions) (1940–41) and Posel Božského Srdce Páně (The Messenger of Devine Lord’s Heart) (1937–41).

In 1939, Dorost (The Youth) magazine outraged the German invaders when, on the title page, it published a photomontage depicting Christ-Herakles conquering the three-headed dog Cerberus who guarded the kingdom of darkness and death. In the mouth of this accomplice of Death was a swastika, the symbol of Nazism.

The editors Alois Koláček SJ and Adolf Kajpr SJ were reproved repeatedly by the Gestapo. In March, 1940, Koláček was arrested and in April Dorost was discontinued. Kajpr, however, cared so much about young people that, without permission from the offices, he began publishing Nové směry (New Directions) magazine, encouraging his young readers and listeners toward faith, hope and authentic patriotism.

He pointed out that the only real leader of humanity is Christ and that a Christian is supposed to be on the side of those defenders of good, justice, law and equality for all people and nations, even when called to love one’s homeland first and foremost. It was for these reasons that in February 1941, he opposed the situation when collaborators used Saint Wenceslas to justify the affiliation of Czechs with the Reich. This attracted the attention of the Gestapo under whose orders the magazine was discontinued.

=== In Nazi concentration camps (1941–1945) ===
On 20 March 1941 Kajpr was arrested for writing “seditious” and “spiteful” articles against the Reich. First, he was imprisoned in Pankrác and later in the Terezín concentration camp which included a “break” while working in a group that reconstructed a building and garden in Nová Huť (now Nižbor) near Beroun for the recreation of the Gestapo members.

After a temporary return to Pankrác in September 1941, he was transported to the Mauthausen concentration camp where he worked in the infamously dreadful quarry. In May 1942 he was transported to the Dachau concentration camp where he lived until the end of the war in the so-called priest block. He worked in the plantation group among other assignments. He was able to maintain correspondence with Prague Jesuits.

On 29 April 1945, Dachau was liberated. Less than a month later, on 21 May 1945, Kajpr was transported to his homeland and to St. Ignatius Church in Prague. For his dedication and perseverance, on 12 August 1947 he received two state awards from the president of the republic.

=== Reassumed clerical and editorial activity (1945–1950) ===
On 15 August 1945, Kajpr took a fourth oath of the order and became professor of the Society of Jesus. He was a well-known preacher and leader of spiritual restorations and exercitations. He resumed the publication of Dorost, although he shortly thereafter also became editor of Katolík: list pro kulturu a život z víry (Catholic: a Periodical of Culture and Life from Faith), a magazine which, from 1945 to 1948, became his chief platform, besides the pulpit, for spreading the Gospel, his conception of Christian life and apostolate, as well as his commentary on the current society.

The periodical had a great impact on the way in which worshippers in post-war Czechoslovakia perceived the development of the increasing power of the communist party. Although Kajpr himself was a man of considerable social consciousness, the character of that era forced him to polemize Marxism-Leninism. He warned openly that any atheistic humanism must lead to concentration camps, prisons, executions and many other forms of persecution. As early as February 1948, the Katolík (Catholic) periodical was declared anti-government and reactionist, its permission to publish revoked, and thereby ceased to exist.

Kajpr then fully devoted his activities to his pastorate. In his homilies he strengthened the faith of his listeners and continued his polemic against materialism and the Marxist criticism of religion.

=== Arrest and communist prison (1950–1959) ===
On 14 March 1950 Kajpr was arrested on the instruction of the Minister of Justice and the chairman of the State Office for Religious Matters, Alexej Čepička. They wanted to demonstrate through these orders that the Church is a dangerous enemy of the state that must be opposed. The process was also to prepare an intervention against all male monastic orders (so-called Operation K). Kajpr was chosen for his fame and for his criticism of communist ideology and practices.

Like the Nazis, the communist also arrested him for his “seditious” articles against the people’s democratic system and for his “subversive” homilies, as well as “espionage” for the Vatican. The trial in the case of Machalka and others was held from 31 March to 5 April, 1950. Kajpr’s behaviour was courageous, truthful and composed. He was found guilty of high treason and sentenced to 12 years’ imprisonment along with other additional sentences.

After conviction, Kajpr was first imprisoned in Pankrác, later in Mírov and Valdice, and finally in Leopoldov in Slovakia. The testimonies from his inmates reveal Kajpr’s deep faith and modest piousness. They describe his spiritual sermons intended for the imprisoned priests, his exhortations secretly sent to layman inmates, his exercitations and his assistance in preparing secret novices in the Society of Jesus. They tell about his life with the imprisoned Jesuits, about his relationship with prison guards and inmates and of lectures and discussions in the fields of philosophy, liturgy, literature etc.

=== Death with the reputation of holiness (1959) ===
On 13 September 1959 he suffered a heart attack during his work and was transported to the prison hospital. Then on 17 September 1959 he suffered a second heart attack and died. He was 57 years old. After consulting with their superiors, the prison administration decided to bury him in the local cemetery in a grave marked only with his number. Only later, during Prague Spring – the temporary liberalisation of the political system – were his remains exhumed (on 24 October 1968) and moved to Prague and, on 25 October, buried in the tomb of the order in Vyšehrad.

In the following years, the trial was repeatedly re-examined. The justice continually changed its decision according to the changing political environment. The final decision was made on 16 December 1993 when the court decided that Kajpr was entitled to legal exoneration as he had been imprisoned illegally. He was thus officially declared innocent.

Kajpr was a member of the Society of Jesus for 31 years and a priest for 24 years. During that time, he had been imprisoned for 12.5 years for his faith in Jesus Christ and for his devotion to the Church; he died in prison as a result of his imprisonment.

== Reputation of martyrdom and holiness ==
=== Fama martyrii ===
Calls for beatification began directly after Kajpr’s death. Pope John Paul II himself presented him as one of the monks who succeeded in “setting an example of great dignity by living in accordance with Christian virtues” (26 April 1997) even under the conditions of Nazi concentration camps, and saying that “he died with the reputation of holiness” (20 May 1995).

In the course of time, his colleagues and Brothers, witnesses and others – as well as subsequent researchers, gave extraordinary evidence of his life. Here we present three examples; others can be found in the book Maximální křesťanství (Maximum Christianity).

Václav Feřt SJ (priest and former superior of Kajpr), 1959: ”A person believing with his whole heart and as pious as a child, a stirring preacher and original writer, fearless editor and dutiful patriot. [...] His life and especially his clerical life was really a conciliatory sacrifice. More than half of his prolific clerical life he spent in prison. [...] The fire started in his heart never went out. It consumed him fully at the altar of sacrifice. I believe that our dear Father Kajpr was transferred from this purgative fire of his long-time sacrifice as a faithful follower of Christ to the bright fire of the Holy Spirit and God’s love, where he will be our powerful intercessor together with the other saints and beatified priests who have come to the Lord before us. Rest in peace and plead for the Lord’s favour!”

Jan Formánek SJ (a priest, Kajpr’s colleague in the order), 1978: “Respect for this Father is spreading, not only among his Brothers but also among those who knew him from his Apostolic activities at the pulpit in St. Ignatius Church, or as an excellent editor of the magazine for young people Dorost (The Youth) or the Catholic monthly Posel Božského Srdce Páně (Messenger of the Devine Lord’s Heart) and later also as a Catholic journalist and editor of the Catholic weekly Katolík (Catholic).”

Richard Čemus SJ (priest, professor of theology), 2013: “Kajpr’s story is a story of evidence for Christ as brought to the extreme. Such martyrdom is not only a matter of the past: Even nowadays it does not lose anything of its brightness, purity and urgent appeal.” “All those who knew him agree unanimously that Kajpr lived and died in fama sanctitatis et fama martyrii (with the reputation of holiness and martyrdom)”.

=== Beatification process ===
In the autumn of 2017 the Superior General of the Society of Jesus Arturo Sosa SJ granted the request of the superior of the Czech province Josef Stuchlý SJ and gave consent to the commencement of the beatification process of Adolf Kajpr. For the first stage, which happens at the level of the diocese, Prof. Vojtěch Novotný from the Catholic Theological Faculty of Charles University was appointed vice postulator. He turned to the Prague archbishop with a request to commence examining of the life and martyrdom of the servant of God Adolf Kajpr. The purpose of beatification is to celebrate the Tri-personal God, to thank him and to introduce to him this beatified person as his intercessor and an example of a successful Christian life. The examining itself was inaugurated on 22 September 2019 in the end of Holy Mass during which the relics of Adolf Kajpr were deposited in St. Ignatius Church in Prague.

== Ideas and work: Servant of the Word ==
=== Preacher and editor ===
One of the Kajpr’s foremost qualities was his ability to perform the “service of word”, i.e. various forms of spreading the joyful news of Jesus Christ and his work. He was able to show what the community of people and Christ, in other words the Church, could be like and how it should be reflected in human deeds. He was able to read the signs of the times and show that “Christ’s message offers a valid and beautiful answer to all questions, even the thorny ones”, and that “all the daily events are grounded in eternity”.

He spread his ideas primarily in the form of sermons: he was known as being a skillful, stirring and excellent preacher, “mighty in word” (comp. Lk 24,19). His second area of activity was editing magazines of the order, to which he himself contributed. In the post-war period, it was chiefly Katolík: list pro kulturu a život z víry (Catholic: a Periodical of Culture and Life from Faith).

=== Topics ===
As mentioned above, the key point in Kajpr’s sermons was the focus on the human life of Christ. To live a life in this way, individuals draw mainly upon their participation in the Holy Mass and subsequently they are asked to give witness of Christ and God through their words and life for it to be understood by their contemporaries as clearly as possible. According to God’s example, it is necessary to sympathise with human needs and suffering.

The worshipper is asked to take part in the life of society, to become involved in it and to be aware of what is happening, as a thinking human being and as a Christian. The task of a Christian press is not only to inform but also to form. Kajpr also expressed love for his mother country, yet again in compliance with Christianity. Of all governmental systems, he preferred democracy despite being aware of its weaknesses. He pointed out its non-compliance with Christianity as well as the danger of a loss in human dignity when a political system turns away from God.

Kajpr also did not neglect the significance of the Virgin Mary.

Extracts from Kajpr’s texts concerning the individual topics are presented on the website of St. Ignatius Church in Prague (link: http://www.kostelignac.cz/index.php?page=13&art=153).

== Kajpr’s works ==
A list of Kajpr’s works, which includes mainly contributions to the magazines he edited, can be found in the book NOVOTNÝ, Vojtěch. Maximální křesťanství: Adolf Kajpr SJ a list Katolík (Maximum Christianity: Adolf Kajpr SJ an Catholic periodical. Prague: Karolinum, 2012, p. 266–291 (Bibliography of the periodical Katolík: list pro kulturu a život z víry (1945–1948) (Catholic: a Periodical for Culture and Life from Faith). In the electronic form it is available here. http://karolinum.cz/ink2_stat/index.jsp?include=podrobnosti&id=7848&zalozka=6)

From the post-war period there are a total of 104 speeches preserved and they are presented in the book by NOVOTNÝ, Vojtěch. Ministerium verbi: Kázání Adolfa Kajpra o mši svaté, o posledních věcech člověka a o rozličných aspektech víry (Ministerium Verbi: Sermon by Adolf Kajpr about Holy Mass, Four Last Thinks of Man and Various Aspects of Faith). Prague: Karolinum, 2017.

== Bibliography ==
- Novotný, Vojtěch. Ministerium verbi: Kázání Adolfa Kajpra o mši svaté, o posledních věcech člověka a o rozličných aspektech víry (Ministerium Verbi: Sermon by Adolf Kajpr about Holy Mass, Four Last Thoughts of Man and Various Aspects of Faith). Prague: Karolinum, 2017.
- Novéna o otci Adolfu Kajprovi: (5. 7. 1902 – 17. 9. 1959) (Novena for Father Adolf Kajpr: (5 July 1902 – 17 September 1959). Selected and arranged by Michal Altrichter. Olomouc: Publishing house Centra Aletti Refugium Velehrad-Roma, 2017.
- Novotný, Vojtěch. Maximální křesťanství: Adolf Kajpr SJ a list Katolík (Maximum Christianity: Adolf Kajpr SJ and Catholic Periodical). Prague: Karolinum, 2012.
- Pavlík, Jan. Vzpomínky na zemřelé jezuity, narozené v Čechách, na Moravě a v moravském Slezsku od roku 1814 (Memories of Deceased Jesuits born in Bohemia, Moravia and Moravian Silesia after 1814). Olomouc: Refugium Velehrad-Roma, 2011, p. 341–347.
- Kajpr, Adolf. Svědectví doby (Testimony of the Era). Prague: Czech Christian Academy, 1993.
- Other homilies, lectures and texts concerning Adolf Knajpr are available at http://www.kostelignac.cz/index.php?page=13&art=94
