= Maria Petra Giordano =

Italian Dominican nun

Servant of God Maria Petra Giordano OP
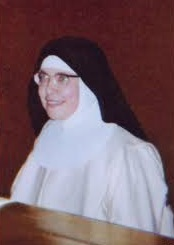
- Born: Nicoletta Giordano; 4 July 1912; Naples, Italy
- Died: 21 June 2006 (aged 93); Bibbiena, Arezzo, Italy

Maria Petra Giordano, OP (born Nicoletta Giordano; 4 July 1912 – 21 June 2006) was an Italian Dominican nun from Monastero de Santa Maria del Sasso. Her cause for beatification has been initiated.

== Biography ==
=== Early life ===
Giordano was born in Naples on 4 July 1912, the firstborn of nine children. Her father, Luigi, had a company with 350 workers. In 1927, the Giordanos had a difficult time when Luigi did not want to join the National Fascist Party. Consequently, they moved to Rome where her father accepted a job as a clerk in a shop.

From an early age, Giordano was known to be obedient, lively and caring of others. She did not neglect her Christian commitment and her own spirituality, so much so that she joined the Third Order of Saint Dominic at the Basilica of Santa Maria sopra Minerva and assiduously collaborated with parish activities. Due to her mother's recurring illness and frailty, she also took charge of providing for her siblings' needs.

=== Religious life ===
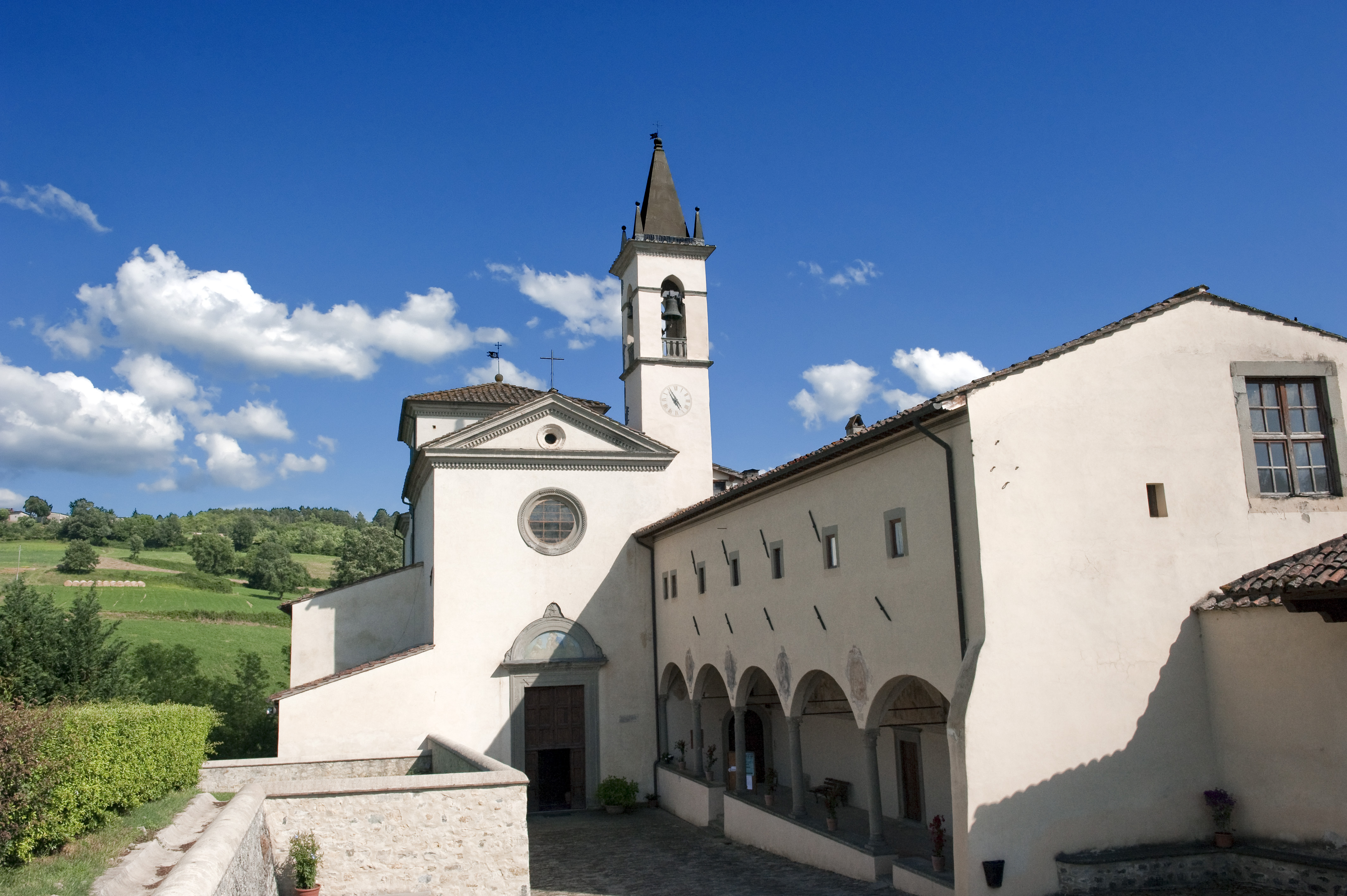
The Church of Santa Maria del Sasso connected to the Dominican Monastery.

At about twenty years of age, Giordano consecrated herself to the Sacred Heart of Jesus as a victim soul. Likewise, she began to develop a strong attraction for religious life and, in particular, for Dominican spirituality. At first, her family duties held her back from making this choice. On 4 November 1934, after finally receiving the approval of her family, at the age of twenty-two, she entered the Monastery of Bibbiena, near Santa Maria del Sasso, Arezzo to devote herself to a life of contemplation.

Within the community she held several offices: mistress of novices and prioress. She also became a member of the commission for the updating of the Constitutions after the Second Vatican Council. Giordano died on 21 June 2006, with the reputation for holiness.

== Beatification process ==
On 7 October 2013, Francesco Maria Ricci OP, the appointed postulator, requested the Diocese of Arezzo-Cortona-Sansepolcro with the Supplex libellus to introduce the cause for the beatification of Maria Petra Giordano. In February 2014, Bishop Riccardo Fontana of Arezzo-Cortona-Sansepolcro began the initial steps for investigating the possibility of Giordano's beatification process, thus granting her the title of a Servant of God. On 23 June 2016, the diocesan phase of the Giordano's beatification process concluded.
