= Julia Teresa Tallon =

American religious sister (1867–1954)

Venerable Mary Teresa Tallon CSC
- Born: Julia Teresa Tallon; 6 May 1867; Hanover, New York, United States
- Died: 10 March 1954 (aged 86); Monroe, New York, United States

Julia Teresa Tallon (6 May 1867 – 10 March 1954), religious name Mary Teresa, was an American religious sister from the Holy Cross, who founded the "Parish Visitors of Mary Immaculate". Tallon was born to Irish immigrants in New York City and joined the religious life in Indiana despite the protests of her family.

Tallon became titled as a Servant of God on 20 February 2013 under Pope Benedict XVI, when the beatification cause was introduced in the Archdiocese of New York. On June 18, 2026, she was granted the title of a Venerable.

== Life ==
Julia Teresa Tallon was born at a farm in upstate New York 1867 as the seventh of the eight children to the Irish immigrants Peter Tallon (1827 – 21 September 1872) and Bridget Duffy (1827 – 8 August 1905). After the death of her first husband, Peter Tallon, she married John Bogan.

From 1879 she felt a strong call to enter the religious life as a sister despite the protests of her mother and siblings who did not approve of her decision. Her mother in particular – despite her deep faith – did not approve of her daughter's decision though was powerless to prevent this from materializing. Regardless of their opinion she joined the Holy Cross Sisters on 30 April 1887 and resided at their convent until 1920 after the conclusion of World War I. Tallon founded the Parish Visitors of Mary Immaculate in New York on 15 August 1920 – a congregation that now operates in Nigeria and the Philippines.

Tallon suffered from disabling illnesses in the final two decades of her life and she hid the fact that she was sick though a few of her colleagues knew of this. On 10 February 1954 she was critically ill after suffering a fall in her room and spent the next month in pain. She died on the evening of 10 March 1954 just as her fellow sisters concluded the recitation of the rosary at her bedside.

Her remains were exhumed for canonical inspection and transferred on 16 October 2015 and then relocated for the final time on 9 December 2015.

== Beatification cause ==
The beatification process opened after the Congregation for the Causes of Saints issued the nihil obstat ("nothing against") to the cause in February 2013. The diocesan process opened on 16 April 2013 and concluded on 13 January 2015 in which Cardinal Timothy Dolan both inaugurated and concluded the process. The Congregation received all the boxes of documentation on 22 January 2015 and validated the process on 29 April 2016. On June 18, 2026, Pope Leo XIV promulgated the decree recognizing her heroic virtue. The postulator assigned to the cause is Waldery Hilgeman.
