= Santa Maria del Sasso =

Church building in Bibbiena, Italy

Coordinates: 43°42′00.77″N 11°49′46.11″E

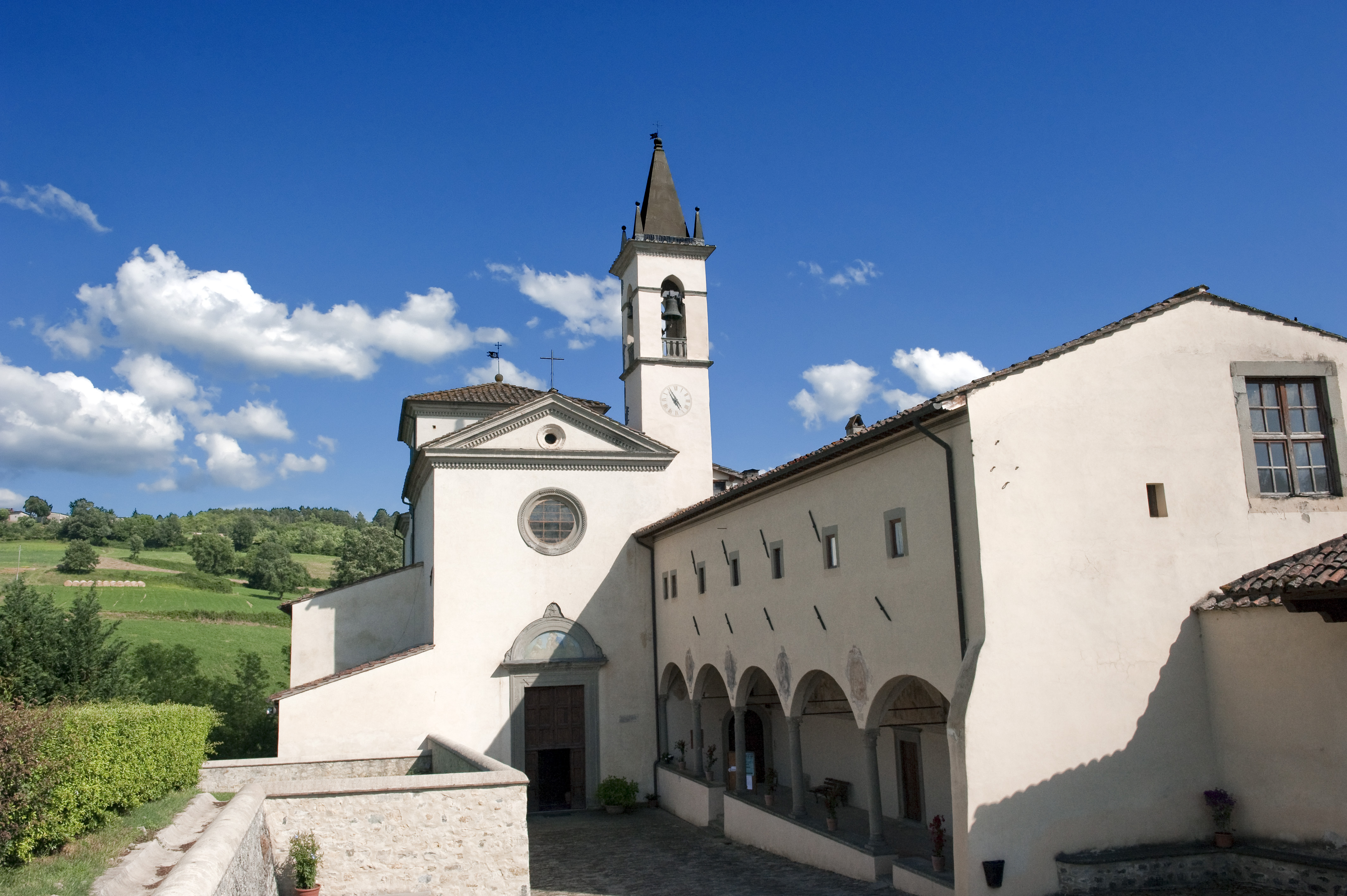
View of the exterior showing the portico

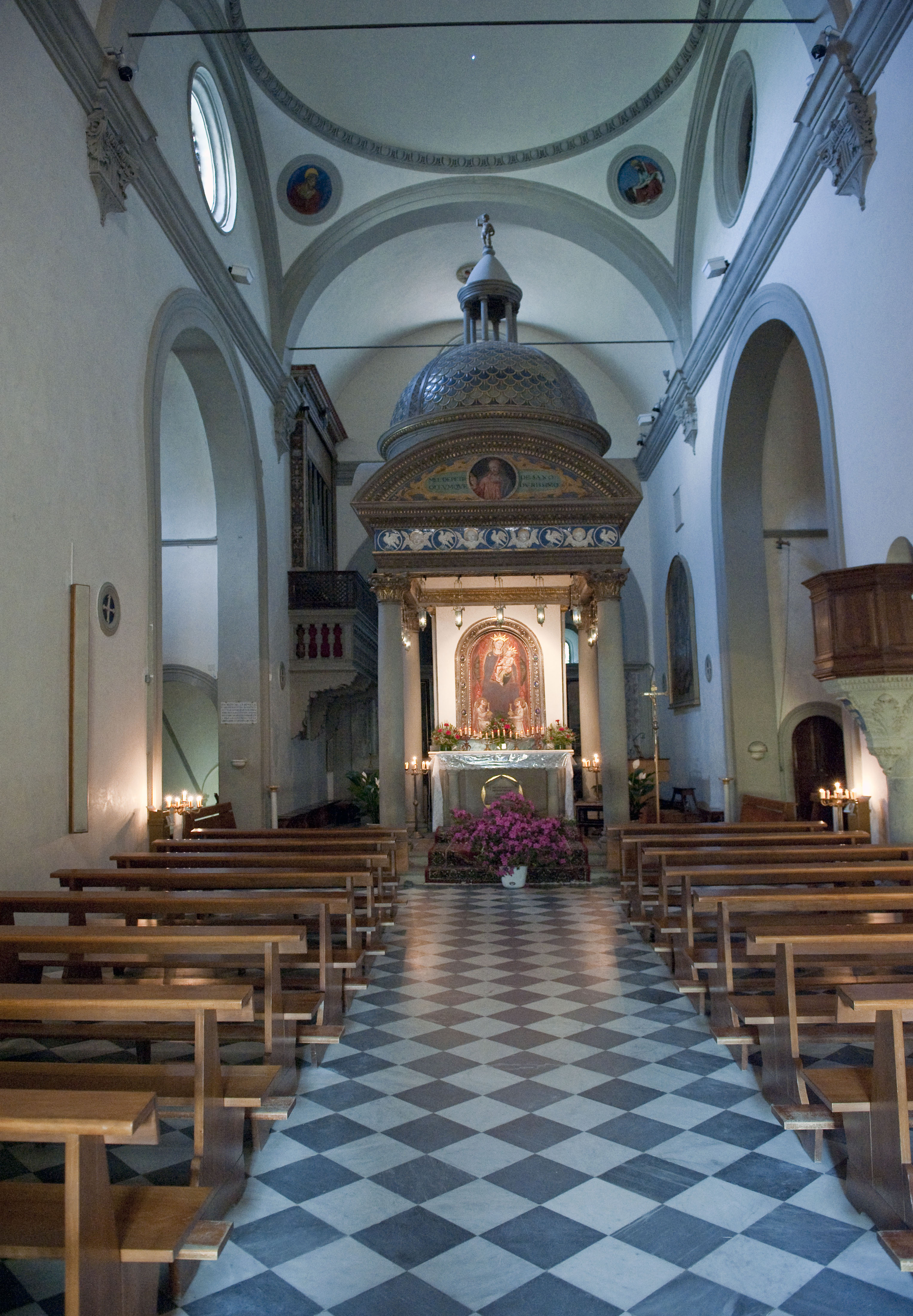
Interior with tempietto

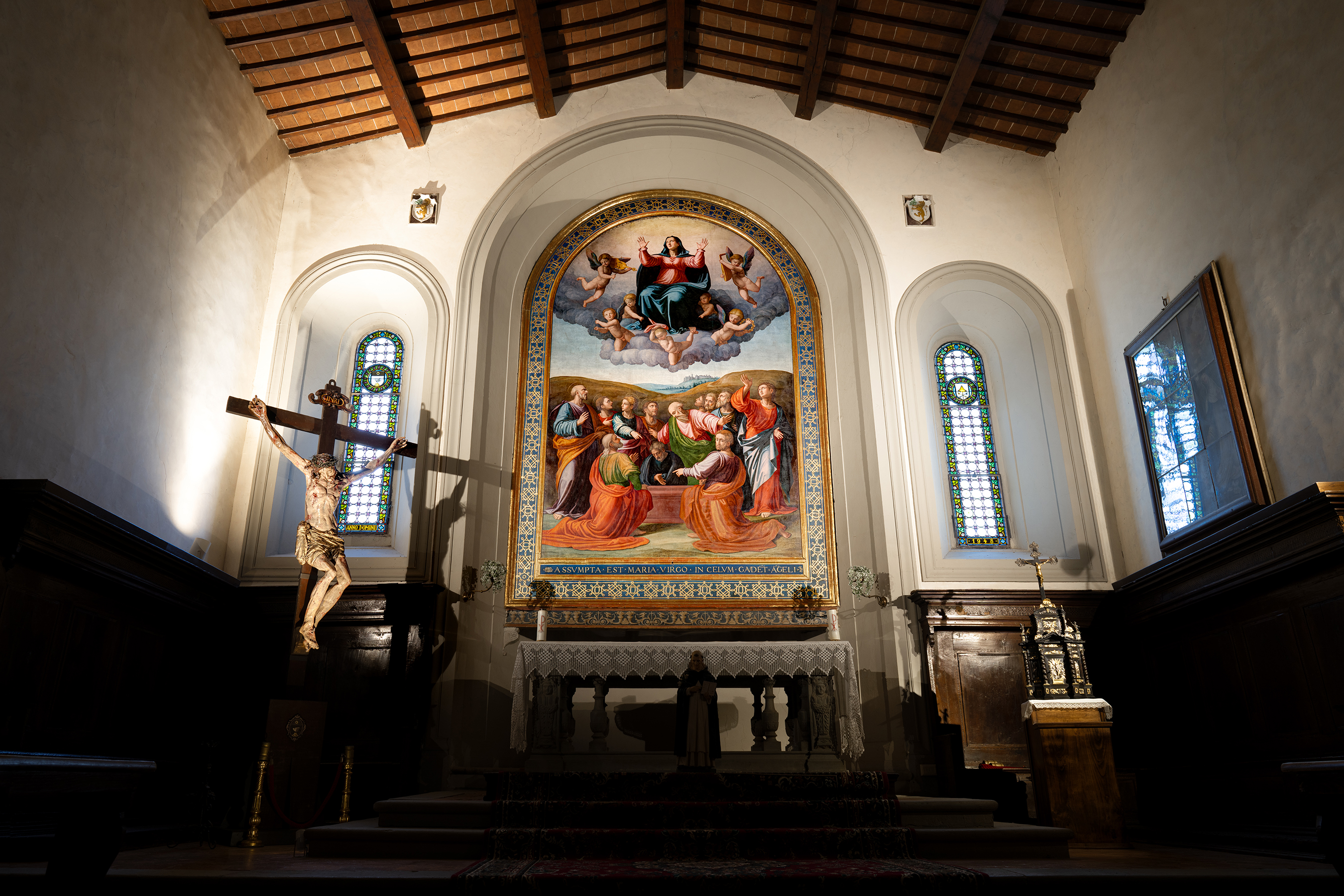
Sanctuary of Santa Maria del Sasso

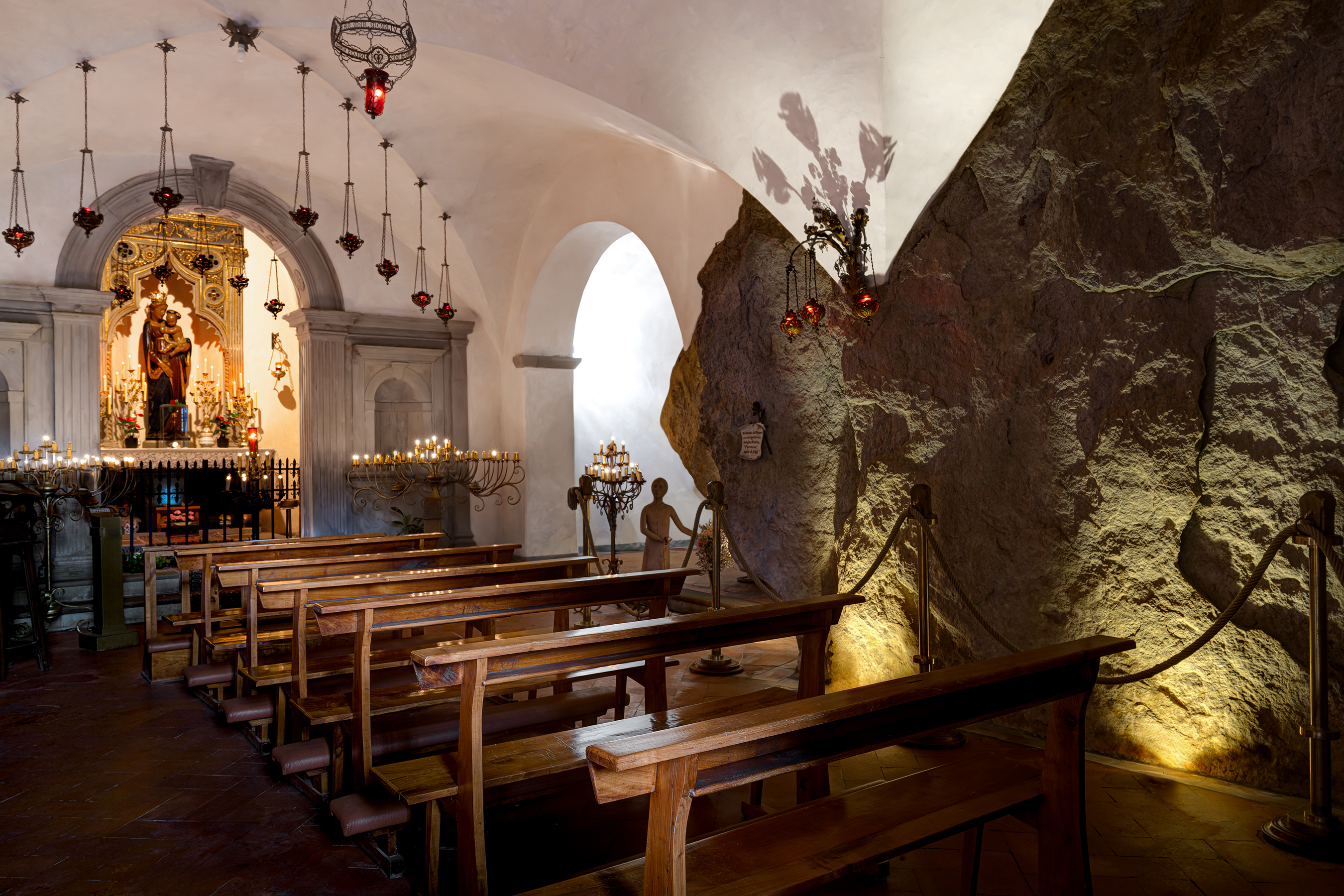
The "rock" in the Crypt. Sanctuary of Santa Maria del Sasso

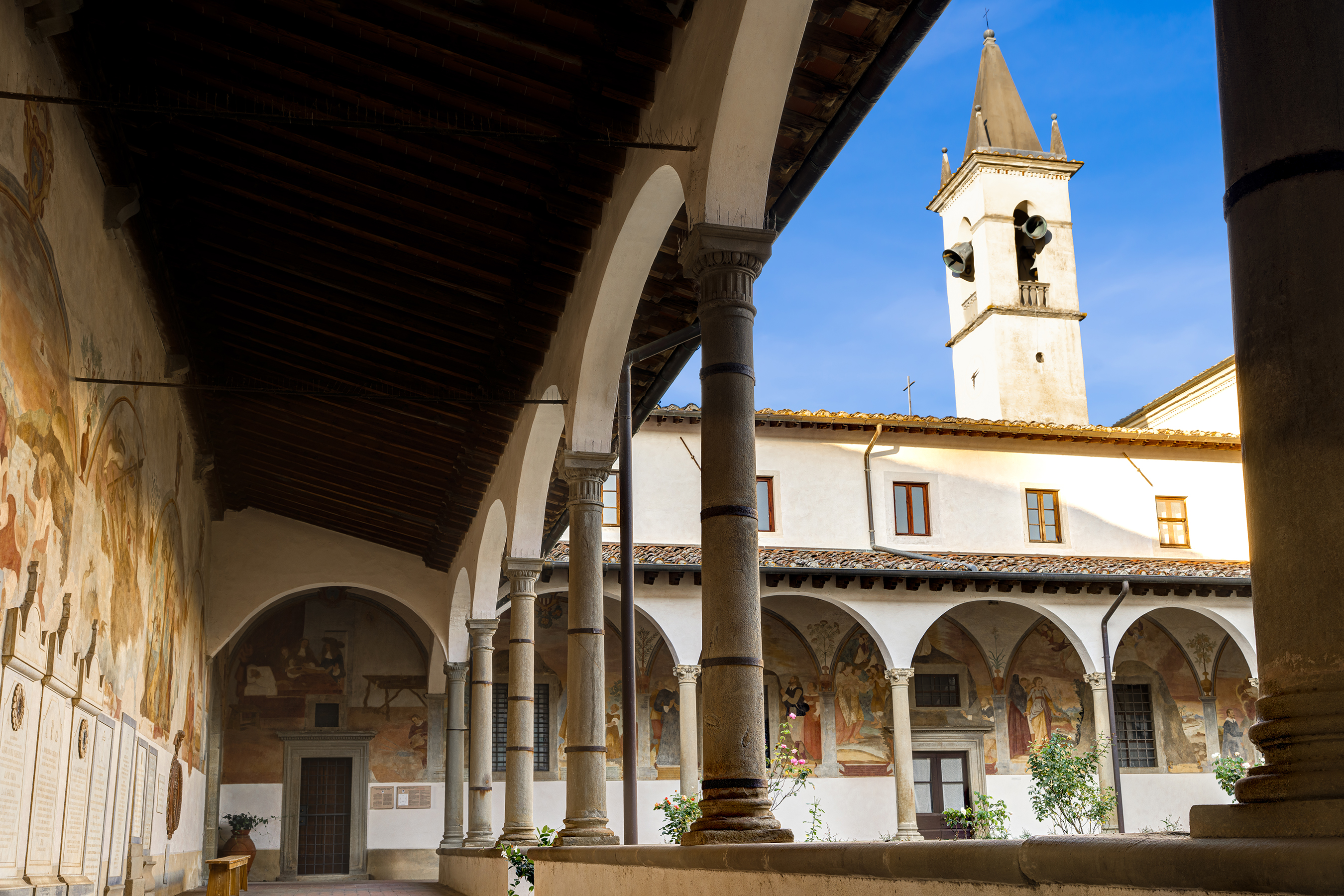
Cloister of Sanctuary of Santa Maria del Sasso

The Basilica of the Madonna of Sasso (English: Basilica of Our Lady of the Rock) is a Roman Catholic minor basilica and Marian renaissance church near Bibbiena in Tuscany, Italy.

Pope Pius XII raised the shrine to the status of a Minor Basilica via the decree Beatissimæ Virgini Dei on 15 August 1942. The decree was signed and notarized by the former Vatican Secretary of State, Cardinal Luigi Maglione.

== History ==
The first church on the site was constructed in 1347 following a reported appearance of the Virgin Mary on 23 June 1347. The current building was commissioned by Lorenzo de' Medici and constructed by Giuliano da Maiano starting in 1486. Following a visit by Girolamo Savonarola in 1495 the work was expanded to include a convent and sanctuary. It was given the status of minor basilica in 1942.

In the centre of the church there is a tempietto or free-standing chapel containing a fresco of the Madonna and child by Bicci di Lorenzo. There is an altarpiece of Christ and John the Baptist in polychrome terracotta by Giovanni della Robbia, and another Madonna and child by Fra Paolo da Pistoia.
