= Hředle (Rakovník District) =

- Municipality
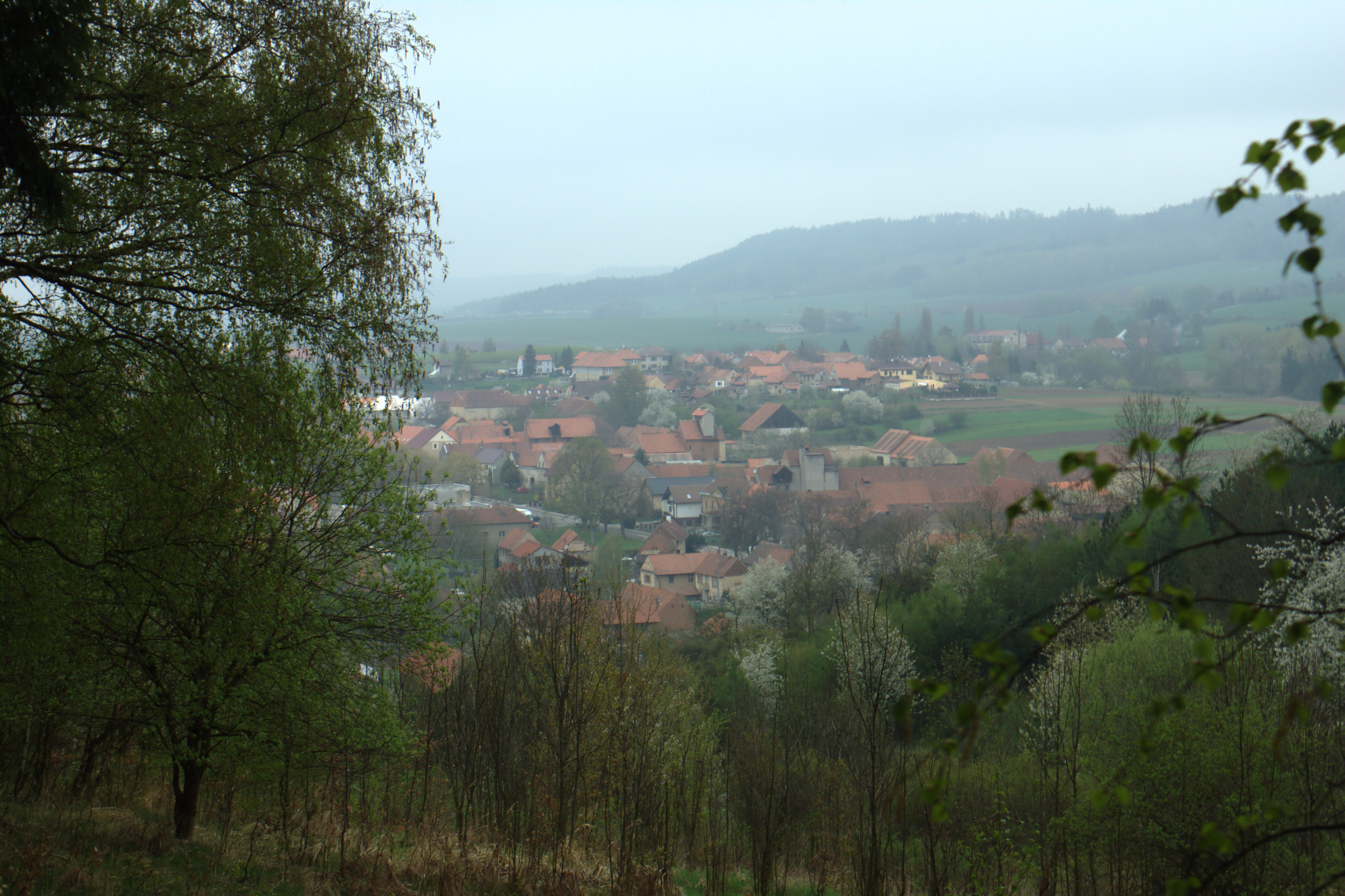
- View from the south

- Flag Coat of arms

- Location in the Czech Republic
- Coordinates: 50°11′17″N 13°44′58″E
- Country: Czech Republic
- Region: Central Bohemian
- District: Rakovník
- First mentioned: 1227

Area
  - Total: 8.23 km^{2} (3.18 sq mi)
- Elevation: 396 m (1,299 ft)

Population (2026-01-01)
  - Total: 570
  - Density: 69/km^{2} (180/sq mi)
- Time zone: UTC+1 (CET)
  - Summer (DST): UTC+2 (CEST)
- Postal code: 270 08
- Website: www.hredle.cz

Hředle is a municipality and village in Rakovník District in the Central Bohemian Region of the Czech Republic. It has about 600 inhabitants.

== Demographics ==
Historical population
Year	Pop.	±%
1869	819	—
1880	967	+18.1%
1890	880	−9.0%
1900	939	+6.7%
1910	1,087	+15.8%
1921	1,219	+12.1%
1930	1,158	−5.0%
1950	847	−26.9%
1961	763	−9.9%
1970	712	−6.7%
1980	632	−11.2%
1991	572	−9.5%
2001	564	−1.4%
2011	578	+2.5%
2021	571	−1.2%
Source: Censuses
