= Anne-Gabrielle Caron =

French Catholic Servant of God (2002–2010)

Servant of God Anne-Gabrielle Caron
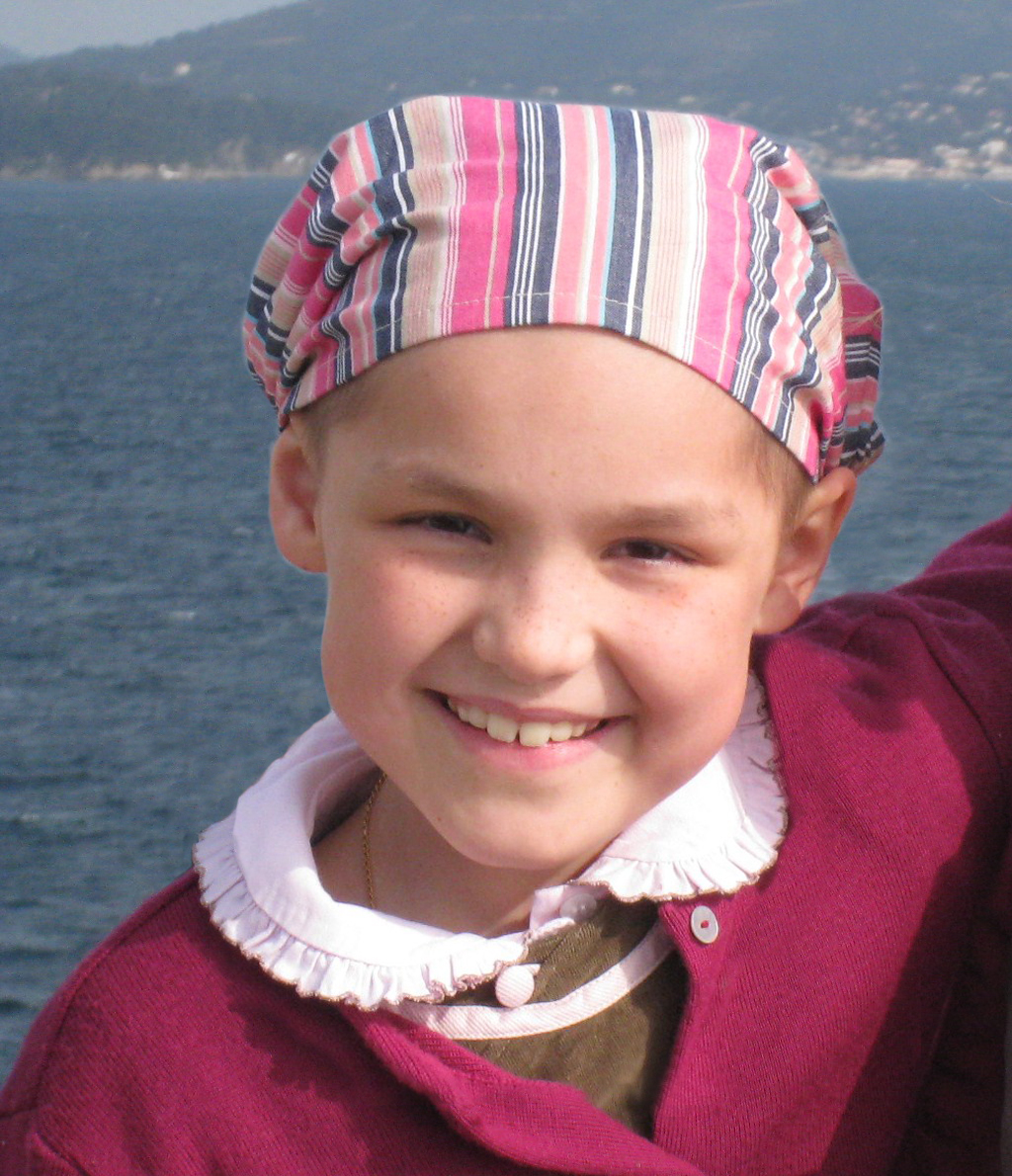
- Caron at age 7
- Born: 29 January 2002; Toulon, France
- Died: 23 July 2010 (aged 8); Marseille, France

Anne-Gabrielle Marie Estelle Caron (29 January 2002, Toulon – 23 July 2010, Marseille) was a young French Catholic girl who died at the age of eight from cancer. Recognized for her witness of faith and holiness, her cause for beatification was opened in October 2020 by the Diocese of Fréjus-Toulon, and she has since been accorded the title of Servant of God.

== Biography ==
Anne-Gabrielle Caron was born in 2002 in Toulon. She was the eldest daughter of a naval officer, Alexandre Caron, and a literature teacher, Marie-Dauphine Caron. She was one of five children, along with François-Xavier, Blanche, Alix, and Louis-Marie.

From the age of two and a half, her attentiveness to others and her piety were already noticeable. When she was four years old, she expressed her impatience to die in order to see God. For one year, in 2006–2007, she moved with her family to French Guiana. Upon her return, she made a point of welcoming and integrating new students into her first-grade class.

In the subsequent year, beginning in the summer of 2008, she began to experience pain in her right leg. The affliction progressively intensified. A biopsy performed in February 2009 revealed that she was afflicted with Ewing sarcoma, a rare and aggressive form of bone cancer.

Hospitalized in Marseille at the La Timone Hospital, she underwent intensive chemotherapy treatments. During a period of remission, she made her First Communion and received the Sacrament of Confirmation.

She engaged in profound reflection upon her sufferings and tribulations, voicing complaints on multiple occasions, yet ultimately embracing them with acceptance. She offered fervent prayers to the Blessed Virgin Mary. She was exacting both in her personal conduct and in her expectations of those around her, and she disapproved of any deficiency in charity or any inclination toward slander. Her suffering was considerable. In her final days, she received the Eucharist daily. She departed this life on July 23, 2010, at the La Timone Hospital.

== Cause for beatification ==
The parish of Saint-François-de-Paule in Toulon carried out the preliminary steps for the opening of the cause for the possible beatification of Anne-Gabrielle Caron, and documents and testimonies concerning her have been collected since 2018.

The cause was opened in the Diocese of Fréjus-Toulon in 2019. The Congregation for the Causes of Saints indicated in May 2020 that there was no impediment to this cause. The assembly of French bishops gave a favorable opinion on June 10, 2020, regarding the opening of this cause, after having heard the Bishop of Fréjus-Toulon on the matter.

The diocesan inquiry for her beatification was officially opened in September 2020. Anne-Gabrielle Caron was thus recognized as a Servant of God. The diocesan investigation concluded on December 7, 2024, opening the second phase of the beatification procedure before the Dicastery for the Causes of Saints.
