= Hředle (Beroun District) =

- Municipality
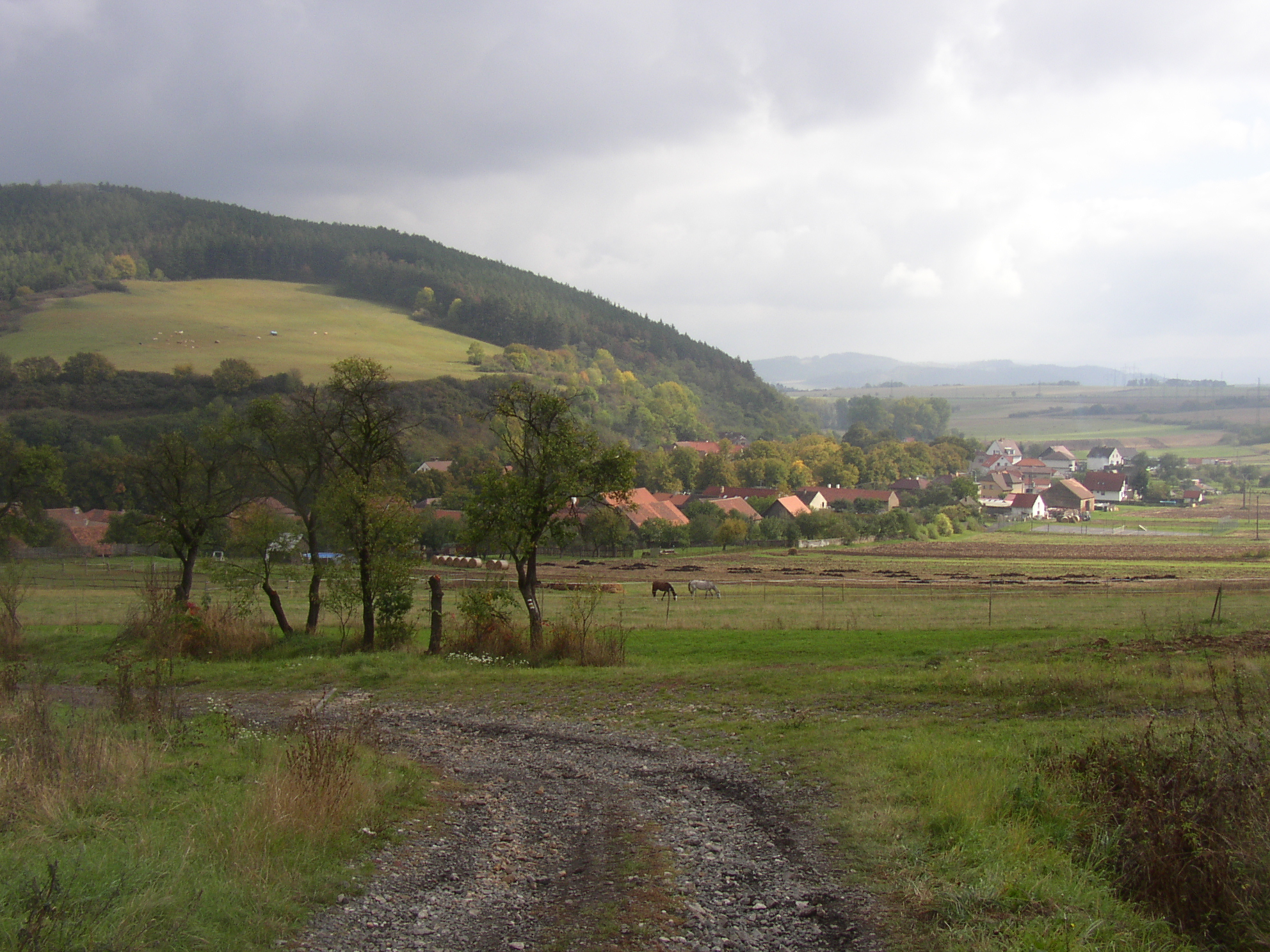
- Southern part of Hředle with Homole Hill

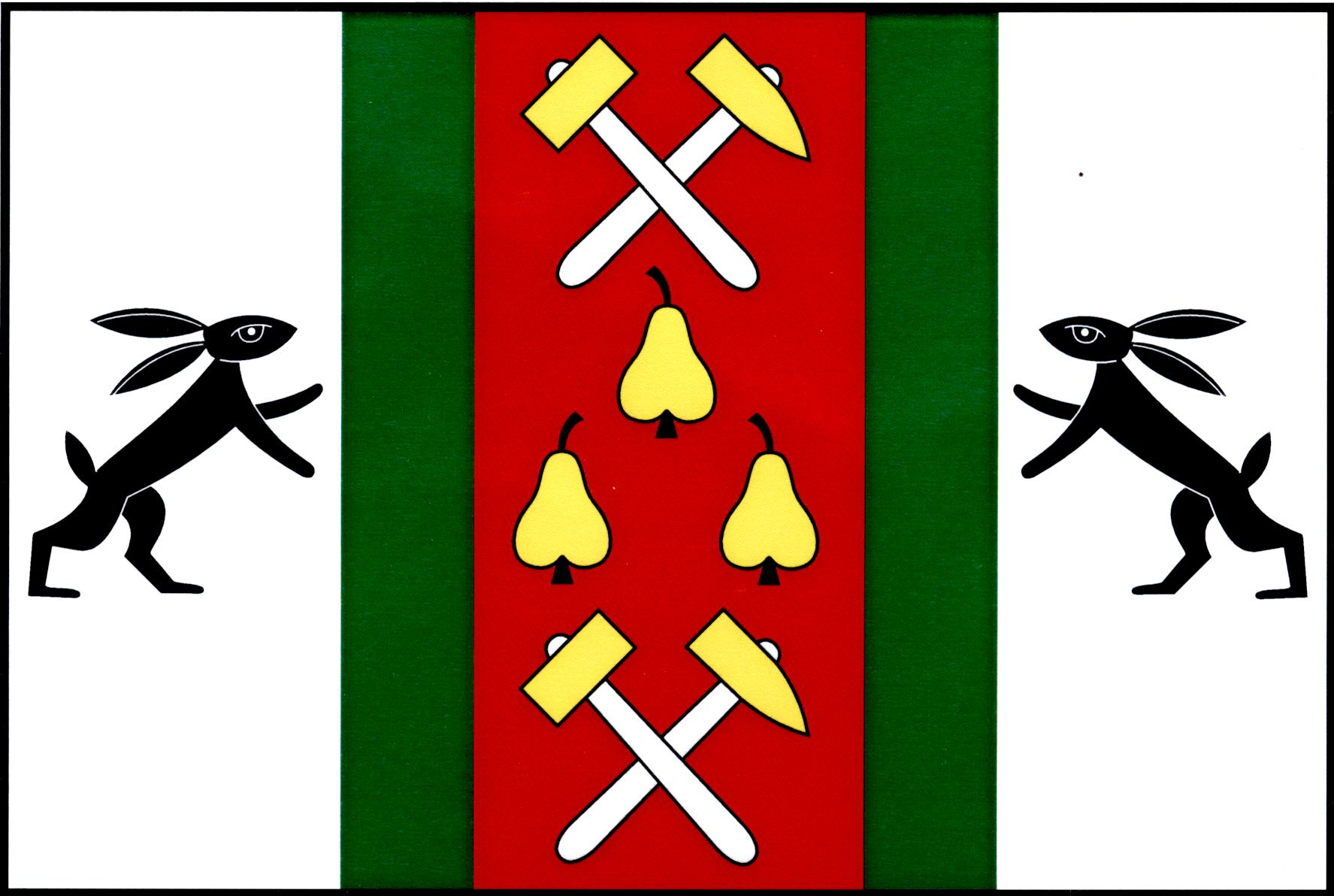
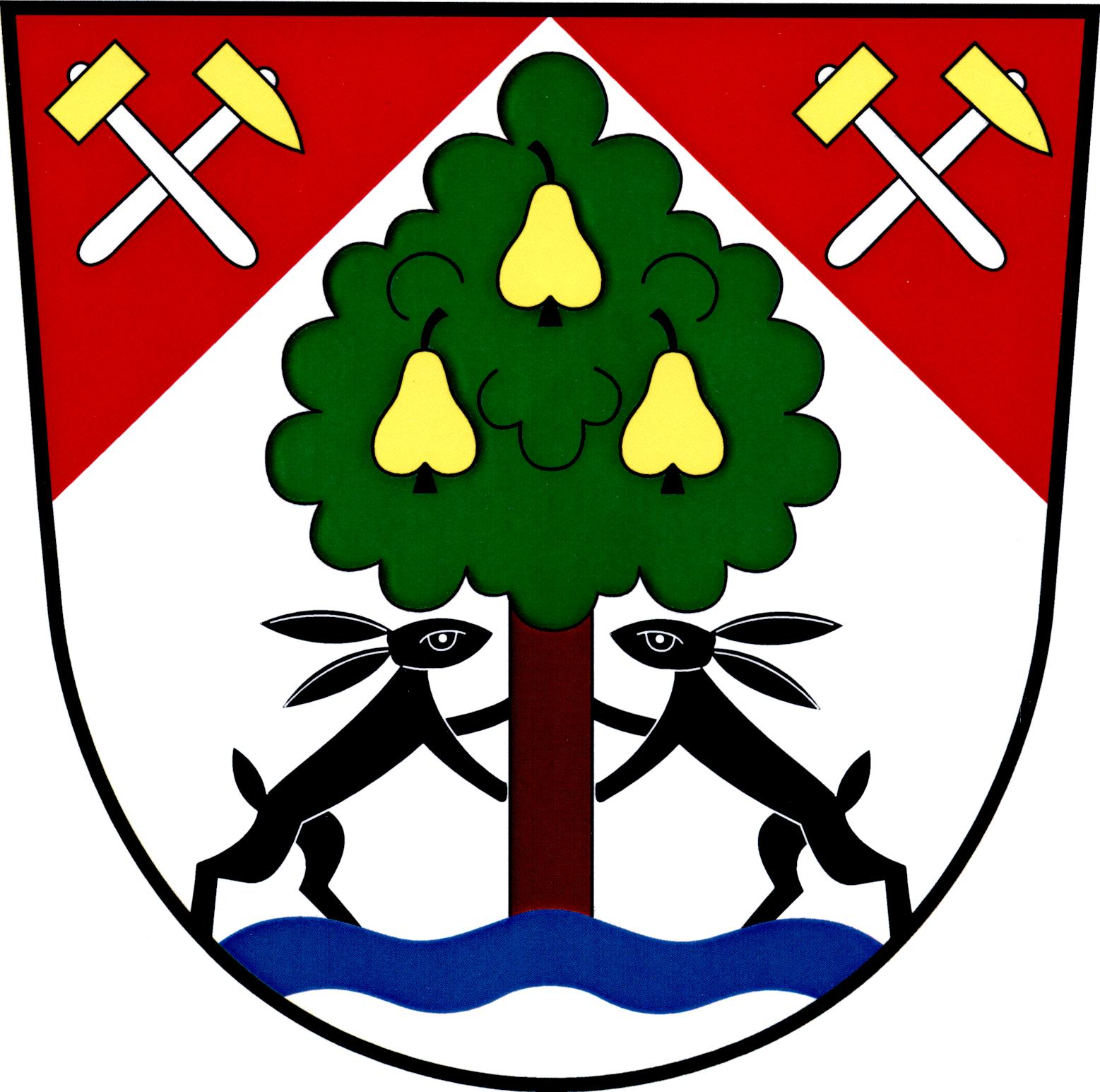
- Flag Coat of arms

- Location in the Czech Republic
- Coordinates: 49°54′14″N 13°55′14″E
- Country: Czech Republic
- Region: Central Bohemian
- District: Beroun
- First mentioned: 1336

Area
  - Total: 12.35 km^{2} (4.77 sq mi)
- Elevation: 238 m (781 ft)

Population (2026-01-01)
  - Total: 406
  - Density: 32.9/km^{2} (85.1/sq mi)
- Time zone: UTC+1 (CET)
  - Summer (DST): UTC+2 (CEST)
- Postal code: 267 51
- Website: www.obechredle.cz

Hředle is a municipality and village in Beroun District in the Central Bohemian Region of the Czech Republic. It has about 400 inhabitants.

== Demographics ==
Historical population
| Year | Pop. | ±% |
|---|---|---|
| 1869 | 605 | — |
| 1880 | 598 | −1.2% |
| 1890 | 604 | +1.0% |
| 1900 | 669 | +10.8% |
| 1910 | 665 | −0.6% |
| 1921 | 667 | +0.3% |
| 1930 | 652 | −2.2% |
| 1950 | 478 | −26.7% |
| 1961 | 416 | −13.0% |
| 1970 | 408 | −1.9% |
| 1980 | 372 | −8.8% |
| 1991 | 309 | −16.9% |
| 2001 | 307 | −0.6% |
| 2011 | 384 | +25.1% |
| 2021 | 401 | +4.4% |
Source: Censuses
