= List of Swedish noble families =

This is a list of Swedish noble families, which are divided into two main groups:

- Introduced nobility, i.e. noble families introduced at the Swedish House of Nobility
- Unintroduced nobility, i.e. noble families which have not been introduced at the Swedish House of Nobility, mostly consisting of foreign nobility resident in Sweden, but also including some families ennobled by the Swedish monarchs and some other groups.

The introduced nobility is divided into three ranks: Comital families, Baronial families and untitled noble families (in addition, members of the royal family hold ducal titles).

The unintroduced nobility consists of families of princely, ducal, marquis, comital, baronial, and untitled noble rank. This group notably includes several branches of the House of Bernadotte with foreign (princely and comital) noble titles (such as Count of Wisborg).

The vast majority of both introduced and unintroduced noble families are untitled.

== Introduced nobility ==
The introduced noble families are listed in the Palace of the Nobility according to the official numbering system which roughly corresponds to the order of introduction. Lower numbers indicate older nobility. Higher numbers indicate later introduction, and usually means that the family belongs to the younger nobility, even though introduction may occasionally not have followed immediately upon ennoblement. In the case of families of Countly or Baronial status, higher numbers indicate that it was raised to a higher title at a later point in time. Branches of the same family may have been introduced under different numbers and may appear in more than one place in the list.

=== Families with the title of count (Grevliga ätter) ===
1. Brahe
2. Lewenhaupt (of the same origin as Leijonhufvud)
3. De la Gardie
4. Oxenstierna af Södermöre
5. von Thurn
6. af Wasaborg
7. Torstensson
8. Oxenstierna af Korsholm och Wasa
9. Horn af Björneborg
10. Oxenstierna af Croneborg
11. Banér
12. Stenbock
13. Wrangel af Salmis
14. von Köningsmarck
15. Wittenberg
16. Tott
17. Lillie
18. Kagg
19. Douglas
20. Schlippenbach
21. von Steinberg
22. Carlsson
23. von Ascheberg
24. Gyllenstierna af Ericsberg
25. Wachtmeister af Johannishus
26. Fleming
27. Wrede
28. Sperling
29. Bielke
30. Lichton
31. Hastfer
32. Lindschöld
33. Stålarm
34. Gyllenstierna af Steninge
35. Gyldenstolpe
36. Dahlberg
37. Wrangel af Adinal
38. Falkenberg af Sandemar
39. Wachtmeister af Mälsåker
40. Wallenstedt
41. Bonde af Björnö
42. Gyllenborg
43. Mellin
44. Polus
45. Gyllenstierna af Björksund och Helgö
46. Piper
47. Gyllenstierna af Fogelvik
48. Rehnskiöld
49. Frölich
50. Stromberg
51. Posse
52. Nieroth
53. Horn af Ekebyholm
54. Spens
55. Cronhielm af Flosta
56. von Fersen
57. Reenstierna
58. Tessin
59. Meijerfeldt
60. Mörner af Morlanda
61. Dücker
62. Taube
63. Sparre af Sundby
64. Bonde af Säfstaholm
65. Dohna
66. Sparre af Söfdeborg
67. Lieven
68. Creutz
69. Cronhielm af Hakunge
70. Horn af Rantzien
71. Ekeblad
72. Lillienstedt
73. Leijonstedt
74. Sparre
75. Lagerberg
76. Strömfelt
77. Törnflycht
78. Hård
79. Putbus
80. von Düben
81. Barck
82. von Hessenstein
83. Cronstedt
84. Löwen
85. von Rosen
86. Hamilton
87. Löwenhielm
88. von Seth
89. von Höpken
90. von Hermansson
91. Kalling
92. Horn af Åminne
93. Wrangel af Sauss
94. von Schwerin
95. Sinclair
96. von Saltza
97. Falkenberg af Bålby
98. Stålhandske
99. Wrangel
100. Stackelberg
101. Lillienberg
102. Bunge
103. Munck
104. Beck-Friis
105. af Ugglas
106. Strömfelt
107. Klingspor
108. Ruuth
109. Mörner af Tuna
110. von Lantinghausen
111. Sparre
112. Taube
113. Ehrensvärd
114. Thott
115. Lagerbjelke
116. Anckarsvärd
117. von Stedingk
118. von Essen
119. Ridderstolpe
120. Liljecrantz
121. von Engeström
122. Puke
123. Rosenblad
124. Sandels
125. Adlercreutz
126. von Platen
127. Toll (Swedish family)
128. Barnekow
129. Tawast
130. Adlersparre
131. de Geer af Leufsta
132. Fleming
133. Snoilsky
134. Lagerbring
135. Cederström
136. af Wetterstedt
137. Skjöldebrand
138. Adelswärd
139. Wirsén
140. Björnstjerna
141. Posse
142. von Saltza

=== Baronial families (Friherrliga ätter) ===
1. Oxenstierna af Eka och Lindö
2. Horn af Åminne
3. Gyllenstierna af Lundholm
4. De la Gardie
5. Schenck
6. Bielke
7. Gyllenhielm
8. Skytte af Duderhof
9. Spens
10. Khewenhüller
11. Sparre,
12. Bååt
13. Lilliehöök
14. Cruus af Gudhem
15. Ryning
16. Kurck
17. Fleming af Liebelitz
18. Gyllenstierna af Ulaborg
19. Soop af Limingo
20. Bonde
21. Horn af Marienborg
22. Banér
23. Natt och Dag
24. Stiernsköld
25. Posse af Hedensund
26. Leijonhufvud
27. Kagg
28. Bielkenstierna
29. Rosenhane
30. von Yxkull-Gyllenband
31. Wachtmeister af Björkö
32. von Bellingshausen
33. Paykull
34. Taube af Karlö
35. Forbus
36. Mörner af Tuna
37. Ulfsparre af Broxvik
38. von der Linde
39. Fleming af Lais
40. Ribbing af Zernava
41. Wrangel af Lindeberg
42. Kruse af Kajbala
43. Sperling
44. Wrede af Elimä
45. Lieven
46. Berendes
47. Stake
48. Creutz
49. Fleetwood
50. Hamilton af Deserf
51. Cronstierna
52. von Scheiding
53. Leijonsköld
54. von Ungern-Sternberg
55. Wrangel af Ludenhof
56. Gripenhielm
57. Posse af Säby, unintroduced comital
58. Schultz von Ascheraden
59. Rålamb
60. Grundel-Helmfelt
61. von der Noth
62. Mörner af Morlanda
63. von Fersen
64. Duwall
65. de Mortaigne
66. Taube af Kudding
67. Palbitzki
68. von Buchwaldt
69. Uggla
70. Marschalck
71. von Börstell
72. Vellingk
73. Marderfelt
74. Meijendorff von Yxkull
75. von der Pahlen
76. Kruuse af Verchou
77. Rehbinder
78. Taube af Sesswegen
79. Siöblad
80. Grothusen
81. von Schönleben
82. Clerck
83. Örneklou
84. Gyldenhoff
85. Tungel
86. Thegner
87. Soop
88. Lovisin
89. Leijonberg
90. Nieroth
91. Grass
92. Mellin
93. Lindhielm
94. Cronhielm
95. Eldstierna
96. Ankarstierna
97. Fägerskiöld
98. von Budberg
99. Hamilton af Hageby
100. Müller von der Lühnen
101. Gyllenpistol
102. Maydell
103. Bergenhjelm
104. von der Osten genannt Sacken
105. Strömfelt
106. Hoghusen
107. Cronhjort
108. Lillieroth
109. Pincier
110. Taube af Odenkat
111. Stuart
112. Trotzig
113. Lagercrona
114. Hummerhielm
115. von Palmenberg
116. Burensköld
117. Coyet
118. Stromberg
119. Lybecker
120. Faltzburg
121. Hård
122. Zülich
123. Palmqvist
124. Hogguer
125. Strömfelt
126. Clodt
127. Stackelberg
128. Fahlström
129. Feif
130. Ranck
131. Patkull von Posendorff
132. Cronberg
133. von Schwerin
134. Cederhielm,
135. von Düben
136. Cronstedt
137. Bildstein
138. Giertta
139. von Düben
140. Leuhusen
141. Wachschlager
142. Leijonhielm
143. Cedercreutz
144. Scheffer
145. Stiernstedt
146. von Psilander
147. Fock
148. Appelman
149. Törnflycht
150. von Otter
151. Cronstedt
152. von Hylteen
153. Törnflycht
154. Bennet
155. Staël von Holstein
156. Lagerberg
157. von Krassow
158. von Essen
159. Silfverhielm
160. Koskull
161. von Höpken
162. Barck
163. Horn af Rantzien
164. Appelbom
165. Örnfelt
166. Stierncrona
167. von Köhler
168. Lillie
169. Fuchs
170. Sack
171. von Düring
172. Fitinghoff
173. Strömfelt
174. Grundel
175. Stierncrantz
176. von Dellwig
177. von Knorring
178. Adlerfelt
179. Rosenstierna
180. von Trautwetter
181. von Löwenstern
182. von Albedyl
183. D'Albedyhll
184. Koskull
185. Ollonberg
186. Roos
187. Sture
188. Cronström
189. Funck
190. Burguer von Ritterstein
191. von Danckwardt
192. Stackelberg
193. Cronman
194. Örnestedt
195. Gyllenkrok
196. Tegensköld
197. Frisenheim
198. von Mengden
199. Wrangel af Adinal
200. von Friesendorff
201. Fehman
202. von Gedda
203. Yxkull
204. Staël von Holstein
205. Åkerhielm af Margrethelund
206. von Kochen
207. Löwen
208. von Rosen
209. von Buddenbrock
210. Ehrenkrona
211. Cederström
212. Palmfelt
213. Armfelt
214. Bunge
215. Lilliecreutz
216. Ribbing af Koberg
217. Reuterholm
218. Ehrenpreus
219. Wrangel af Sauss
220. Palmstierna
221. von Seth
222. Broman
223. von Nolcken
224. Löwenhielm
225. Hårleman
226. Gyllengranat
227. Rudenschöld
228. Ridderstolpe
229. von Grooth
230. Barnekow
231. von Kaulbars
232. Åkerhielm af Blombacka
233. Löwen
234. Djurklou
235. Kalling
236. Stierneld
237. Björnberg
238. Grönhagen
239. Strokirch
240. Hastfer
241. von Lantingshausen
242. Gerdesköld
243. von Roxendorff
244. Gripenstierna
245. Lagerfelt
246. Manderström
247. Lilliesvärd
248. Tilas
249. Adelswärd
250. Hierta
251. Rosir
252. von Kothen
253. de Geer af Leufsta
254. Lagerbielke
255. Falkenberg af Trystorp
256. von Hermansson
257. Klingspor
258. von Blixen later von Blixen-Finecke
259. von Axelson
260. von Saltza
261. Preis
262. Klinckowström
263. Marcks von Württemberg
264. Wennerstedt
265. Horn af Rantzien
266. Adlermarck
267. Ehrensvärd
268. Wrangel von Brehmer
269. Wallenstierna
270. Sinclair
271. De Geer af Tervik
272. Hermelin
273. Lillienberg
274. Adelcrantz
275. Sprengtporten
276. Löwen
277. Mannerheim
278. Beck-Friis
279. Wrangel af Sauss
280. von Höpken
281. Carpelan
282. Rudbeck
283. Silfverschiöld
284. Örnsköld
285. von Segebaden
286. Raab
287. Rappe
288. von Hegardt
289. Pfeiff
290. von Rosen
291. Schmiedefelt
292. Falkenberg af Bålby
293. Falkengréen
294. Boije af Gennäs
295. Ramel
296. Ruuth
297. Liljencrantz
298. Celsing
299. Du Rietz af Hedensberg
300. von Nackreij
301. Thott
302. Alströmer
303. Voltemat
304. Fock
305. von Lingen
306. Maclean
307. Zöge von Manteuffel
308. Staël von Holstein
309. Munck
310. Carpelan
311. af Ugglas
312. De Geer af Finspång
313. von Platen
314. Toll (Swedish family)
315. von Krassow
316. von Stedingk
317. von Rajalin
318. Lilliehorn
319. af Nordin
320. Brauner
321. Tawast
322. Anckarsvärd
323. Rosenblad
324. von Ehrenheim
325. Zibet
326. Lagerheim
327. af Wetterstedt
328. af Puke
329. Adlerbeth
330. Silfversparre
331. Adlercreutz
332. Sandels
333. von Engeström
334. af Klercker
335. von Döbeln
336. Adlerberg
337. Adlersparre
338. Tersmeden
339. af Håkansson
340. Löfvenskjöld
341. Lagerheim
342. von Stedingk
343. Nauckhoff
344. von Willebrand
345. Skjöldebrand
346. Lagerbring
347. Wirsén
348. von Strokirch
349. Björnstjerna
350. von Schulzenheim
351. von Rehausen
352. Drufva
353. von der Lancken von Wackenitz
354. Fock
355. Brändström
356. Edelcrantz
357. Nordenskjöld
358. Lagerbring
359. af Klinteberg
360. Trolle
361. Edelcreutz
362. Haij
363. Coyet
364. von Platen
365. Gyllensköld
366. Ehrenborgh
367. Ulfsparre
368. de la Grange
369. Lagerstråle
370. von Paykull
371. von Plomgren
372. Nieroth
373. Skjöldebrand
374. Battram
375. Bergenstråhle
376. von Kantzow
377. Reuterskiöld
378. af Tibell
379. von Vegesack
380. von Schulzenheim
381. Hierta
382. Franc-Sparre
383. d'Ohsson
384. Vult von Steijern
385. von Brinkman
386. Berzelius
387. von Weigel
388. Gyllenhaal
389. von Kræmer
390. Nordenfalk
391. Hochschild
392. Peyron
393. af Schmidt
394. Nordensköld
395. Tamm
396. Gyllenhaal till Härlingstorp
397. von Rosén
398. Ihre
399. von Beskow
400. Bergenstråhle
401. Braunerhielm
402. Gripenstedt
403. Ericson
404. Bildt
405. Nordenskiöld
406. Dickson

=== Adliga ätter (Untitled Nobility) ===
This is the list of Adliga ätter officially posted by the Riddarhuset in Stockholm, Sweden

1. Lilliehöök af Fårdala
2. Forstena-släkten
3. Bååt
4. Fleming
5. Kyle
6. Lillie af Greger Matssons ätt
7. Sparre af Rossvik
8. Bielke af Åkerö
9. Ulfsparre af Broxvik, 1 unintroduced baronial
10. Soop
11. Bonde
12. Horn af Kanckas
13. Natt och Dag, unintroduced baronial
14. Posse
15. Ribbing
16. Boije af Gennäs
17. Hård af Segerstad
18. Falkenberg af Trystorp
19. Ulfeldt
20. Holck
21. Krabbe af Krageholm
22. Urne
23. Barnekow
24. Ramel
25. Walkendorff
26. Tott
27. Gädda
28. Bille af Dybeck
29. Gyllenstierna af Svaneholm
30. Lindenov
31. Björnklou
32. Stålarm
33. Ehrenstéen
34. Lilliecrona
35. Ekeblad
36. Trolle
37. Rosenstråle
38. Carpelan
39. Stiernkors
40. Gyllenhjerta
41. Hinsebergs-släkten
42. Ållongren i Östergötland
43. Kruse af Elghammar
44. Lilliesparre af Fylleskog
45. Rosladin
46. Krabbe af Svaneby
47. Gyllenanckar
48. Frankelin
49. Bratt af Höglunda
50. Bock af Näs
51. Roos af Hjelmsäter
52. Rosenbielke
53. Lake
54. Gyllencreutz
55. Berendes
56. Ulf af Horsnäs
57. Ikorn
58. Rääf i Finland
59. Hand
60. Ille
61. Kijl
62. Månesköld af Seglinge
63. Sack
64. Tawast
65. Lillietopp
66. Lilliehöök af Gälared och Kolbäck
67. Körning
68. Kagg
69. Cruus af Edeby
70. Kafle
71. von Scheiding
72. Stubbe)
73. Lillie af Ökna
74. Lilliesparre af Kragstad
75. Siöblad
76. Yxkull
77. Stierna
78. von Warnstedt
79. Store
80. Gyllengrip
81. Skytte i Finland
82. Drake af Intorp
83. Stolpe
84. Örnflycht
85. Jakobsköld
86. Stuart
87. Stråle af Ekna
88. Tott af Skedebo
89. Wildeman
90. Drake af Hagelsrum
91. Mörner
92. Creutz
93. Silfverhielm
94. von Birckholtz
95. Dufva i Finland
96. Pauli
97. Slatte
98. Stålhandske
99. Silfversparre
100. Uggla
101. Silfverbielke
102. Oxehufwud
103. Oxe
104. Beurræus
105. Falkenberg af Bålby
106. Slang
107. Ulfsax
108. Ankar
109. Lillie af Aspenäs
110. Stake
111. Ljuster
112. Hjortö-släkten eller Ulfsparre
113. Stackelberg
114. Jägerhorn af Spurila
115. Ållongren i Finland
116. Gyllenhorn
117. Lemnie
118. Bagge af Berga
119. Duse
120. Lilliestjelke
121. Hierta
122. Bagge af Boo
123. Rosenquist
124. Sting
125. Ruuth i Finland
126. Bure
127. Böllja
128. Mannersköld
129. Rylanda och Häggatorps-släkten, eller Lindelöf af Kedom
130. Munck af Fulkila
131. Gyllenmärs
132. Hästehufvud
133. Frille
134. Papegoja
135. Hammarskjöld
136. Crusebjörn
137. Eketrä
138. Plåt
139. Kåse
140. Tegel
141. Svärd
142. Svart
143. Lindelöf
144. Skalm i Finland
145. Svinhufvud af Qvalstad
146. Gyllensparre
147. Bagge af Söderby
148. Ållonsköld eller Härlingstorpssläkten
149. Palm
150. Sabelsköld
151. Trana
152. Sabel
153. Ulffana
154. Skytte af Sätra
155. Ram
156. Falck
157. Lood i Småland
158. Reuter af Skälboö
159. Finckenberg
160. Spåre
161. Bröms
162. Galle i Sverige
163. Holst
164. Rosenquist af Åkershult
165. Melker Axelssons släkt
166. Stöör
167. Geete
168. Gyllencornett
169. Bååt eller Lennart Nilssons släkt
170. Adler Salvius, unintroduced baronial
171. Stiernfelt eller Grubbe
172. Rosenstierna
173. Lode från Livland
174. Forbes af Lund
175. Rotkirch
176. Schulman
177. Strijk
178. Oliveblad
179. von der Linde
180. Stiernhielm
181. Grönberg
182. Tungel
183. Dufva i Vestergötland
184. Silfverswärd
185. Gyllenållon
186. Sabelhierta
187. Hästesko af Målagård
188. Sabelfana
189. Rääf i Småland
190. Rosendufva
191. Delphin
192. Grijs
193. Bäck i Finland
194. Galle i Finland
195. Klingspor
196. Bärfelt
197. Rosencrantz af Granhammar
198. Armsköld
199. Svinhufvud i Westergötland
200. Creutzhammar
201. Brand
202. Bähr
203. Langman
204. Björnram af Helgås
205. Stewart
206. Sabelstierna
207. Dücker
208. Hökeflycht
209. Lund
210. Ållon Finland
211. Ödell eller Ödla
212. Lind af Hageby
213. Utter
214. Crail
215. Ramsay
216. Gyllenlood
217. Ekelöf
218. Månesköld af Norge
219. Grönfelt
220. Fitinghoff
221. Ankarfjell
222. Starck
223. Stråle af Sjöared
224. Strömfelt
225. Wädurhorn
226. Jägerhorn af Storby
227. Fogelhufvud
228. Hästesköld
229. Footangel
230. Pilefelt
231. Robertsson
232. Sölfverarm
233. Stårck
234. Törnsköld
235. Örnehufvud
236. Anrep
237. Patkull
238. Bille
239. Silfverpatron
240. Gyllensvärd
241. Duwall
242. Philip
243. Jordan
244. Skalm i Finland
245. Blåfield
246. Poitz
247. Bock af Bukkila
248. Koskull
249. Forbes
250. Lillieström
251. Jernlod
252. Silfvercrona
253. Pistol
254. Lilliecrona
255. Löfling
256. Gyllenstråle
257. Hästesko
258. Svenske
259. von Neüman
260. Dachsberg
261. Gyllenax
262. Lind i Västergötland
263. Planting sedermera Planting-Gyllenbåga
264. Silfverlood
265. Silfverstierna
266. Stålman
267. Garfwe
268. Björnsköld
269. Gyldenklou
270. Rehnskiöld
271. Ruuth i Västergötland
272. Zelow
273. Lilliebjelke
274. Ankarsköld
275. Boose
276. Grothusen
277. Ogilwie
278. Hammarstierna
279. Giös
280. De la Motte
281. Gyllengren
282. Schildt
283. Ikornsköld
284. Silfverbögel
285. Ekestubbe
286. Hästesko-Fortuna
287. Rosensköld
288. Bråkenhusen
289. Rosenschmidt
290. Appelgren
291. De Geer
292. Stålhane
293. Lilliebrunn
294. Svanfelt
295. Kohl
296. Transehe von Roseneck
297. Grissbach
298. Bergenfelt
299. Thomson
300. Björnram
301. Wachttorn
302. Hjulhammar
303. Blume (Blom)
304. Printz
305. Rodersköld
306. Hildring
307. Gärffelt
308. Irving
309. Årrhane
310. Mannerhielm
311. Anckarhielm
312. Andeflycht
313. Drakenberg
314. Reuter
315. Lofelt
316. Stormhatt
317. Sabelfelt
318. Enhörning
319. Blanckenfjell
320. Igelström
321. Pistolekors
322. Rosenberg
323. von Schwalch
324. Leuhusen
325. Appelbom
326. Rosenhielm
327. Örneklou
328. Rutensköld
329. von Meijer
330. Kuhlefelt
331. Oljeqvist
332. Stiernflycht
333. Leijonstierna
334. Svärdsköld
335. Grubbe
336. Graan
337. Linderoth
338. Lindegren
339. Morgonstierna
340. Fägerskiöld
341. von Radeke
342. Strussberg
343. Falkengréen
344. Lagerfelt
345. Bröstfelt
346. Gyllenfalk
347. Gyllenpistol
348. Svanestierna
349. Rosenbom
350. Ekegren
351. Kugelhielm
352. Örnevinge
353. Loberg
354. Wärnschöld
355. de Laval
356. Wudd
357. Tornerefelt
358. Björnhufvud
359. Björnberg
360. Klingenberg
361. Drake af Torp och Hamra
362. Rossfelt
363. Hulshorst
364. Blixencron
365. Strömberg
366. Wolffensköld
367. Renhorn
368. Leijonburg
369. Dreffensköld
370. Cantersten
371. Palmkron
372. Gladtsten
373. Lünow
374. Verdelet de Fornoy
375. Udnie
376. von Ridderhusen
377. Silfverlåås
378. Silfvergren
379. Lindeberg
380. Ekehielm
381. Cronlood
382. Sass
383. Golawitz
384. Grass
385. Silfverspåre
386. Brandt
387. Åkerfelt
388. Gyldenär
389. Bohl
390. Leijonram
391. Lagergréen
392. Bråkensköld
393. Gyllensting
394. von Schlangenfeldt genannt Degingk, unintroduced baronial
395. Kempensköld
396. Pilegren
397. Svanström
398. Lagercrantz
399. Silfverax
400. Strusshielm
401. Reuterfeldt
402. Ramsvärd
403. Krakenhoff
404. Rosenbröijer
405. Hillesköld
406. Fahnehielm
407. Klöfverfelt
408. Danckwardt-Lillieström
409. Sölfvermusköt
410. Rutenfelt
411. Fritz
412. Lagercrantz
413. von Weidenhaijn
414. Welsk
415. Hufvudskått
416. Ollonberg
417. von Chemnitz
418. Gyllenbögel
419. Rosenhand
420. Björnefelt
421. Landzberg
422. Durell
423. Urqvard
424. Armlod
425. Örnstierna
426. Djurfelt
427. Lilliestierna
428. Wolfsberg
429. Skytte
430. Hirtenberg
431. Jernsköld
432. von Schaar
433. Clerck
434. Gyllenflög
435. Sparrfelt
436. Stierncreutz
437. Taubenfelt
438. von Faltzburg
439. Lindorm
440. Didron, unintroduced baronial
441. Stålklinga
442. Clerck
443. Strussflycht
444. Sinclair, unintroduced baronial
445. Dromund
446. Netherwood
447. Wijnbladh
448. Lenck
449. Reutercrantz
450. von Witten af Stensjö
451. Dreffenfelt
452. Nöding
453. Skalm af Karelen
454. Möller
455. von Siegroth
456. Aminoff, unintroduced baronial
457. Silfversvan
458. Armfelt
459. Brandsköld
460. von Krusenstierna
461. Rosensabel
462. Ridderhielm
463. Niethoff
464. Tranefelt
465. Bär
466. Volland von Lande
467. Kuhlman
468. Munck (af Sommernäs)
469. Svärdfelt
470. Bilesköld
471. Stiernhöök
472. Gyldenroos
473. Coyet
474. von Wingarten
475. Stålhielm
476. Ekenberg
477. Bergsköld
478. Printzensköld
479. Lantzenfelt
480. Lilliecrantz
481. Willigman
482. Blanckenfjell
483. Granatenfelt
484. Breitholtz
485. Gairdner
486. Behmer
487. Reenfelt
488. Skyttehielm
489. Rosenlindt
490. Foratt
491. Kalmberg
492. Pistolhjelm
493. Örn
494. Croneborg
495. von Schrowe
496. Stålhammar
497. Lilliefelt
498. Hufvudsköld
499. Scott
500. Wallenstedt
501. Påhlman
502. Storckenfeldt
503. Kewenbrinck (Keffenbrinck von Rhene)
504. Gyldenstolpe
505. Kinnemond
506. von Quanten
507. Solenblomma
508. Silfwerbrand
509. Bergengren
510. Drakenhielm
511. Fahnesköld
512. von Main
513. Makeléer
514. Rithfelt
515. Bäfverfeldt
516. Lybecker
517. Skarpenfelt, sedermera Skarp von Felt
518. Harnesksköld
519. Trafvenfelt
520. Brennerfelt
521. Bogg
522. Bordon
523. Rothlieb
524. Påfvenfelt
525. Cederqvist
526. Grottenfelt
527. von Streitberg
528. von Snoilsky
529. Hoffstedter von Kühnberg
530. Rålambstierna
531. Drakenstierna
532. von Gerstenberg
533. Orrfelt
534. Chounfelt
535. Reuterberg
536. Järnefelt
537. Ryttersköld
538. de Courtin
539. von Hartwigk
540. Bohm
541. Sparfvenfelt
542. Forbes
543. Schillerfelt
544. Dusensköld
545. von Bönhardt
546. Butterlin
547. Axehielm
548. Torwigge
549. Lindeström
550. Teet
551. de Laignier
552. Skraggensköld
553. Sneckenfelt
554. von der Sund
555. Cabeljau
556. Feltberg
557. Teetgren
558. von Schröer
559. Pereswetoff-Morath
560. von Burghausen
561. Kleihe
562. Barclay
563. Wulfrath (von Wolffradt)
564. von Nieroth
565. Schletzer
566. Lilliesköld
567. Crantzfelt
568. Berling
569. Rosenstielke
570. Rosenschantz
571. Stiernstråle
572. Rennerfelt
573. Gyllennieroth
574. Ranck
575. Gyllenpatron
576. Heidensköld
577. Lagercrona
578. Lagersköld
579. Klöfverskjöld
580. Rosenflycht
581. Hillebrand
582. Lillieholm
583. Canterhielm
584. de la Chapelle
585. Eneskjöld
586. Rosenholm
587. Broman
588. von Kysel
589. von Kreijenfels
590. Strömsköld
591. Leijoncrona
592. Bosin
593. Lagerqvist
594. Norfelt
595. Rosencröel
596. von Numers
597. Lilliesköld
598. Reeth
599. Gyldencrantz
600. Rising
601. Uttermarck
602. Sylvius
603. Wrång
604. von Beijer
605. Palmgren
606. Leijonberg
607. Rosenfelt
608. Plenningsköld
609. Duréel
610. Ulfvenklou
611. von Qvickelberg
612. Wattrang
613. Lillieqvist
614. Burensköld
615. von Lillienhielm
616. von Weiker
617. Edenberg
618. Gyldenbring
619. von Schäwenbach
620. Gyllenstake
621. Flygge
622. Svanenberg
623. Strussköld
624. Påfvenhielm
625. Beckerfelt
626. Sinclair, unintroduced baronial
627. Winter
628. Planting-Bergloo
629. Hillebard
630. Stöltenhielm
631. Tandefelt
632. Rundeel
633. Blanck
634. Klingebail
635. von Pegauberg
636. von Sahlfelt
637. Gripensperr
638. Ögnelood
639. Hjortfelt
640. Primeroos
641. Tornerefelt
642. von Becker
643. von Kaulbars
644. Rosendal
645. Möller sedermera Möllerswärd
646. Cronberg
647. Olivecrantz
648. Lithman
649. Lützow
650. Rosenacker
651. Rosenholtz
652. Hägerstierna
653. Clo
654. Winstrup
655. Gyllenadler
656. Siöhielm
657. Palmstruch
658. Leijoncrantz
659. Örnestedt, unintroduced baronial
660. Skunck
661. Klingstedt
662. Österling
663. Dahlepil
664. Månestierna
665. Skytte
666. Du Rietz
667. von Liebstorff
668. Rosenklinga
669. Siölöw
670. Palmqvist
671. Enefelt
672. Wäsenberg
673. Gyllenspetz
674. Ulfsköld
675. Gyllenpamp
676. Kempenfelt
677. Appelman
678. Bildt
679. von Vegesack
680. von Hirscheit (von Hirschheydt)
681. Orcharton
682. Mel
683. Hilchen
684. von der Osten genannt Sacken
685. von Güntersberch
686. Stackelberg
687. von Post
688. Ulf i Finland
689. Brunow
690. Ruuth
691. Huggut
692. Sölfverlood
693. von Rodenburg
694. Rosenfelt
695. Brask
696. Nötebom
697. Silfverharnesk
698. von Wieder
699. Hirschenstierna
700. Anckarhielm
701. von Wallich
702. Prytz
703. Skeckta
704. Skogh
705. af Ellerntorp
706. Rosenmüller
707. Leijonfelt
708. Grubbenhielm
709. Hoghusen
710. Franc
711. Danckwardt
712. Kock von Crimstein
713. Cremer
714. Gyllengranat
715. Skutenberg
716. Grundel
717. Ekensteen
718. Modée
719. Törnecrantz
720. von Mentzer
721. von Dunten
722. Barck
723. von Essen af Zellie
724. von Köbberer
725. Fraser
726. Lillieberg
727. Gripenklo
728. Tawastén
729. von Borneman
730. Stropp
731. Tigerstierna
732. Adlerhielm
733. Lützow
734. Taube
735. von Siegroth
736. Mellin
737. de Moucheron
738. Andersson
739. Esping
740. Nassokin
741. Rigeman
742. von Gröninger
743. Crafoord
744. Treileben
745. Bruce
746. Reiher
747. Liwensten
748. Cronman
749. von Gertten
750. von Sternbach
751. Schmiedefelt
752. Brunell
753. Barnsköld
754. Svärdfelt
755. Bagghufvud (von Baggo)
756. Lindtman
757. von Lillienthal
758. Fechtenberg
759. Stiernelodh
760. Örnestedt
761. Granatenburg
762. Brenner
763. de Besche
764. Wagner
765. Charpentier, unintroduced baronial
766. Stegman
767. von Greiffencrantz
768. Arenfelt
769. von der Deilen
770. Örnecrantz
771. Starenflycht
772. Ehrenberg
773. Du Rees
774. Neümeijer
775. Mannerfelt
776. Gyllenhammar
777. von Hagendorn
778. Leijonancker
779. Twengerhielm
780. Klingenstierna
781. Silfverström
782. Belfrage
783. Ehrenskiöld
784. Leijonhielm
785. Feltreuter
786. Cronström
787. von Schönfelt
788. Skyttenhielm
789. Plaan
790. von Böckeln
791. Lillieflycht
792. Lagerhjelm
793. Falkenhagen
794. Bergenhjelm
795. von Löwenburg
796. Thumb von Weingarten
797. Siöberg
798. Sneckensköld
799. Lillienhoff
800. Beck sedermera Beck-Friis
801. von Stockman
802. Löschern von Hertzfelt
803. von Wedel
804. von Heisen
805. Rutencrantz
806. Cletzer
807. von Rohr
808. von Krefelt
809. Knorring
810. King
811. Zimmerman
812. Goës
813. Barneken
814. Gyllenhaal
815. Gripensköld
816. von Campenhausen, unintroduced baronial
817. Tigerhielm
818. Reenstierna
819. Trotzenfelt
820. Gripenstierna
821. Douglies
822. von Graffenthal
823. Ehrencrantz
824. Storm
825. Lideman
826. Funck
827. Falkensten
828. Nisbeth
829. Wisocki-Hochmuth
830. von Vicken
831. Bennet
832. von der Osten genannt Sacken
833. Werdenhoff
834. Staël von Holstein
835. Rosenmarck
836. Rosenström
837. von Eich
838. Lilliering
839. Rehnberg
840. Holmer
841. Leijonkloo
842. Svanehielm
843. Sneckenberg
844. Tigerklou
845. Rosenhoff
846. Ehrenhielm
847. von Porten
848. Wattrang
849. Utterklo
850. Ahlefelt
851. Canterstierna
852. Törnhielm
853. von Pufendorff, unintroduced baronial
854. Stierncrantz
855. Gyllencartou
856. Thewitz
857. Karlström
858. Stockenström
859. Tessin
860. Flygge
861. von Gegerfelt
862. Gyllenkrok
863. Leijonsten
864. Meijerfeldt
865. Ehrenstrahl, unintroduced baronial
866. Cronsköld
867. Palmström
868. Adlercrona
869. Kanterberg
870. Strömberg
871. Ehrenklo
872. Rudebeck
873. Hägerflycht
874. Wernle
875. Gripenwaldt
876. Leijonberg
877. Ehrenskiöld
878. Buchner
879. Ehrencrona
880. Gyllencrona
881. von Campenhausen
882. Rothåf
883. von Brobergen
884. von Reimers
885. Gyllenharnesk
886. Lilliemarck
887. Fägerstierna
888. Lilliestierna
889. Furumarck
890. Ehrenfelt
891. von Ellswichshusen
892. Örnfelt
893. Reenhielm
894. Appelroth
895. Lillieborg
896. Cuypercrona
897. Ankarström sedermera Löwenström
898. Leuhusen
899. von Boij
900. Svanlood
901. Gyllenspak
902. Gyllenskepp
903. Cock
904. Appelberg
905. Gerner
906. Werwing
907. Granberg
908. Heidenfelt
909. von Rosenfeldt
910. Spalding
911. Helffreich
912. Apoloff
913. Myhr
914. von Jordan
915. Gripenflycht
916. Gyllencaschett
917. de la Grange
918. Adlerhoff
919. Gyllenståhl
920. Gripenmarck
921. Cedercrantz
922. Berghman
923. Zittelberg
924. Leijonsvärd
925. Lydinghielm
926. Laurin
927. Sparfelt
928. Tegensköld
929. Grönhagen
930. Jäger o von Schulzenjäger
931. Gripenberg
932. von Brömssen
933. Tunderfelt
934. von Streitbach
935. von Preutz
936. Gyllenbreider
937. Gyllentrost
938. Hupenfelt
939. Rosbach
940. Troz
941. Gyllentorner
942. Ramfelt
943. Franc
944. de Besche
945. Pfeiff
946. Drakenfelt
947. Ankargrip
948. Tranefelt
949. Willemsens
950. von der Wettering
951. Wardlau
952. Ehrenflycht
953. Gyllenroth
954. Bråkensköld
955. Ridderberg
956. von Kemphen
957. von Lauw
958. von Dellingshausen
959. Sahlefelt
960. Falkenhielm
961. Hultengren
962. Mannerberg
963. Karlström
964. Krabbenström
965. Sinclair
966. von Runneberg
967. von Hörmansfelt
968. Djurklow
969. Drommel
970. Smittenhielm
971. Kinninmundt
972. Fuchs von Bühlstein
973. Sölfverklinga
974. Gütrie
975. Specht
976. von Halle
977. Baggensköld
978. Örneberg
979. Queckfeldt
980. Cronacker
981. Gyllenstorm
982. Reuterhielm
983. Cronacker
984. Grubbenfelt
985. Ehrenfels
986. von Suurman
987. Åkerhielm
988. Silnecker
989. Billingsköld
990. Oldekop
991. Örneström
992. Silfverklou
993. Palmsköld
994. von Eisen
995. von Kothen
996. Granatenhielm
997. Bäckhusen
998. Brase
999. Losköld
1000. Wennerstedt
1001. Schmiedeberg
1002. Schantz
1003. Ehrenbusch
1004. Adlersten
1005. Trotzig
1006. Riddersköld
1007. Wulfvenstierna, unintroduced baronial
1008. Ridderschantz
1009. Rosenlew (Rosenlew)
1010. Ehrenkrook
1011. Lagercrantz
1012. Silfvercrantz
1013. Franc
1014. Myrtengren
1015. Lithman
1016. Planting-Bergloo
1017. Leijonwall
1018. Gyllenspång
1019. Güntherfelt
1020. von Grotjohan
1021. Klinckow von Friedenschildt
1022. Hilletan
1023. Gyllenpalm
1024. Nohlanvähr
1025. Pistolskiöld
1026. Hougenfelt
1027. von Rothausen
1028. Drakensköld
1029. Gripendahl
1030. Gyllenberg
1031. von Weissenfels
1032. Grotenfelt
1033. Hammarhjelm
1034. Wallenstierna
1035. Wästfelt
1036. Travenhielm
1037. von Franck
1038. Bogeman
1039. Stiernhoff
1040. von Schwartzenhoff
1041. Adlersköld
1042. Nyberg
1043. von Gisler
1044. Witting
1045. Ehrenstierna
1046. Furubom
1047. Sternburg
1048. Tersér el Terschère
1049. von Öller
1050. Lilliegren
1051. Törnefelt
1052. Schönberg
1053. Hammarberg
1054. Billingberg
1055. Bråkenhielm
1056. Schönström
1057. Weinholtz
1058. Piper
1059. von Strokirch
1060. von Gerdes
1061. Adlerberg
1062. Cederström
1063. Cederberg
1064. Örnhjelm
1065. Leijonström
1066. Sneckenberg
1067. von Lissenhaim
1068. Hammarström
1069. Ruuth
1070. von der Lieth
1071. Wetzler
1072. von Pfuel
1073. Silfverskiöld
1074. von Daden
1075. Reutervall
1076. Lagerstierna
1077. Reutermarck
1078. von Bildsten
1079. Freijbourg
1080. von Schattau
1081. Roxendorff
1082. Strokirch
1083. Mannerstedt
1084. von Grooth
1085. Schmedeman
1086. Hackersköld
1087. Tigerschiöld
1088. Leijonflycht
1089. Wiederholt von Weidenhofen
1090. Grönhjelm
1091. Braun
1092. Leijonmarck
1093. von Stegling
1094. Ringstedt
1095. Königsfelt
1096. von Trautwetter
1097. Stiernborg
1098. Lindelöf
1099. Starensköld
1100. Jägerskiöld
1101. Ankarklo
1102. Freidenfelt
1103. Lorfvensköld
1104. Cronstedt
1105. Ankarfelt
1106. Leijonhoff
1107. Tawaststjerna
1108. Lindcrantz
1109. Ehrenborg
1110. Nordenhielm
1111. Sölfverberg
1112. Lagerberg
1113. Treffenberg
1114. Palmfelt, unintroduced baronial
1115. Gyllenhöök
1116. Gyllenstedt
1117. Cederschiöld
1118. Leijondahl
1119. Gripenklo
1120. Fabritius
1121. Hökensköld
1122. Offerman el von Opfern
1123. Ehrnrooth
1124. Ehrenankar
1125. Caméen
1126. von Schmieden
1127. von Walter och Winblad von Walter
1128. Gyldenboij
1129. Edelfelt
1130. Mörling
1131. Adlerström
1132. Snack
1133. von Fleissner
1134. von Maschkow
1135. von Wilckenschildt
1136. de Corroset
1137. Riddermarck
1138. Sparrin
1139. Sackensköld
1140. Ankarstråle
1141. Lagermarck
1142. Ankarstierna
1143. Ankarstierna
1144. Ankarcrantz
1145. Ankarcreutz
1146. Blomensköld
1147. Wernfelt
1148. von Ehrenthal
1149. Hjärne, unintroduced baronial and comital
1150. Schulte von Ritterfelt
1151. von Meijerhelm
1152. Cederstierna
1153. Lilliesvärd
1154. Ridderkorp
1155. Tungelfelt o Wolberg von Tungelfelt
1156. Gyllenström
1157. Arensköld
1158. Adlerborg
1159. Ridderstierna
1160. Höökenberg
1161. Rahnhielm
1162. Hogg
1163. Pahl
1164. von Meurman
1165. Brehmer
1166. Broman
1167. Strömner
1168. Fredenhielm
1169. von Bilang
1170. Stiernström
1171. Lilliegranat
1172. Lohreman
1173. Leijonbielke
1174. Bock från Lahmes
1175. Lagerblad
1176. Leijonflycht
1177. Greiffenschütz
1178. Gyllenschmidt
1179. Granfeldt från Dal
1180. Falkenfelt
1181. Kirstein
1182. Rydingstierna
1183. Klintenhielm
1184. Stiernberg
1185. Krebs
1186. von Westphal
1187. Haij
1188. Leijonsparre
1189. Blix
1190. Adlerstierna
1191. Ankarloo
1192. Ehrenstedt
1193. Adlercrantz
1194. Wallrawe
1195. Sparrsköld
1196. Bäärnhielm
1197. Mannerstierna
1198. Cedercrona
1199. Simmingsköld
1200. von Scheffer
1201. Westenhielm
1202. Canonhielm
1203. von Berco
1204. Wallenhielm
1205. von Weinberg
1206. von Bysing
1207. Gyllensköld
1208. Ridderstorm
1209. Mannerburg
1210. Reuterswärd
1211. Elfvencrona
1212. Lilliengrip
1213. Hägerfelt
1214. Silnecker
1215. Polchow
1216. Steb
1217. Godenhielm
1218. Reuterholm
1219. Elfving
1220. Riddersvärd
1221. Cronmarck
1222. Linroth
1223. Adlerstedt
1224. Westersköld
1225. Ehrenstolpe
1226. Gripenstedt
1227. Tigerstedt
1228. Lagerström
1229. Lagerbom
1230. Spofvenhielm
1231. Feltstierna
1232. Ridderström
1233. von Strokirch
1234. Adlerflycht
1235. von Berchner
1236. Karlsten
1237. von der Wolffesburg
1238. Schmidt
1239. Manderstierna
1240. Gyllenholm
1241. Palmcrantz
1242. Ehrenström
1243. Utterhielm
1244. Stiernklo
1245. de la Grange
1246. Palmstierna
1247. Lindeblad
1248. Leijonstråle
1249. Osenhjelm
1250. Stierneroos
1251. von Lusten
1252. von Rudbeck
1253. de Besche
1254. Tollerhielm
1255. von Schantz
1256. de Behm
1257. Eding
1258. Heerdhielm
1259. Grubbensköld
1260. Mannerheim
1261. Ehrenmarck
1262. Adlerklo
1263. Lillieblad
1264. Svansköld
1265. Gerdes
1266. Lillienstrahl
1267. Rotenburg
1268. von Löwenstern
1269. Prytz
1270. Hallenstedt
1271. Tranhielm
1272. Adlerfelt
1273. Peringskiöld
1274. Wattrang
1275. Enhielm
1276. von Köhnnigstedt
1277. Blixenstierna
1278. Wohlberg
1279. Pihlcrantz
1280. Frölich
1281. von Wedderkop
1282. Gersdorff
1283. von Stefken
1284. Rappe
1285. Wadenfelt
1286. von Kochen
1287. Schauman
1288. Iserhielm
1289. von Heinen
1290. Franckenhielm
1291. Granatenflycht
1292. von Braunjohan
1293. Transchiöld
1294. Langenhielm
1295. Girsström
1296. von Burman
1297. von Spången
1298. Bergengren
1299. de la Vallée
1300. de Besche
1301. von Kathen
1302. Lohielm
1303. Siöstierna
1304. Kuylenstierna
1305. Wallensten
1306. Söderhielm
1307. Sperreuter
1308. Brehmsköld
1309. Nordsköld
1310. Gyllenskog
1311. Gyllenflycht
1312. Brunsköld
1313. Ehrenpreus
1314. Weidenhielm
1315. Leijonstolpe
1316. Tranhielm
1317. Ahlehielm
1318. Stierneld
1319. Tharmoth
1320. Gyllenfelt
1321. Hellenstierna
1322. Broméen
1323. Stiernanckar
1324. Falkenklo
1325. Flintsten
1326. von Schmitt
1327. von Linde
1328. Streithammel
1329. Ehrenbielke
1330. Rosentwist
1331. Kuhlhielm
1332. Hasselbom
1333. Leijongren
1334. Ridderfelt
1335. Leijoncreutz
1336. Cederborg
1337. Ridderbjelke
1338. Ruschenfelt
1339. Ehrencreutz
1340. von Dobrokowsky
1341. Engelcrona
1342. Söderhielm
1343. von Gavel
1344. von Borgen
1345. Königsheim
1346. von Maneken
1347. Stiernstolpe
1348. Blomström
1349. Hägerhjelm
1350. von Engelbrechten
1351. Muhl
1352. Bongenhielm
1353. Rosenstedt
1354. Ehrenman
1355. Tessmar
1356. Törnflycht
1357. Hildebrand
1358. Lagerstedt
1359. Stierndahl
1360. Parmand
1361. Kalling
1362. Odelstierna
1363. Göthe, unintroduced baronial
1364. Ljungfelt
1365. von Brandt
1366. Rudbeck
1367. Brommenstedt
1368. Riddercrantz
1369. Kreij
1370. Stiernblad
1371. Hårleman
1372. Silfverstråle
1373. Dannerhielm
1374. Stiernadler
1375. de Frietzcky
1376. von Brandten
1377. Stiernmarck
1378. Lagerbielke
1379. Lilliecreutz
1380. Starckhufvud
1381. von Porat
1382. Clerck
1383. Daurer
1384. Stierncrona
1385. Lillienadler
1386. Adlercreutz
1387. Wadenstierna
1388. Ehrenspetz
1389. Lohe
1390. Lagerkrook
1391. Hermelin
1392. Manderström
1393. Wingeflycht
1394. Hermann
1395. Greiffenheim
1396. Wattrang
1397. von Staude
1398. Sodenstierna
1399. von Göeding
1400. Hjelmborg
1401. Cronfelt
1402. Bethun
1403. Caménhielm
1404. Cederstedt
1405. Feif
1406. Roxendorff
1407. Zülich
1408. von Löwenheim
1409. Adlermarck
1410. Eksköld
1411. Lagerflycht, twice unintroduced baronial
1412. Danckwardt
1413. Råfelt
1414. von Höpken
1415. Klinckowström, unintroduced baronial
1416. von Graman
1417. Ehrenhoff
1418. Ädelberg
1419. Törne
1420. Rothlöben
1421. Insenstierna
1422. Knipercrona
1423. Tisensten
1424. Wennerstierna
1425. von Brunner
1426. von Ertman
1427. Treffenhielm
1428. Ridderborg
1429. Skraggensköld
1430. Gyllengahm
1431. Lillienberg, 1 unintroduced baronial
1432. Stiernschantz
1433. von Hoffdahl
1434. Gyllenbjelke
1435. Hammarfelt
1436. Gadde
1437. Zeedtz
1438. Stralenberg
1439. Stobée
1440. von Reuterholm
1441. Adelstierna
1442. Ekfelt
1443. Törnstierna
1444. von Neügebauer
1445. Lybecker
1446. Giertta
1447. Mannercrantz
1448. Bunge
1449. von Dahlheim
1450. Odelström
1451. Gripenborg
1452. Hjelmberg
1453. Baas
1454. Loos
1455. Kijl
1456. Lillienstam
1457. Wachschlager
1458. Keder
1459. Rudenhielm
1460. von Soldan
1461. von Eccard
1462. Skutenhielm
1463. von Baumgarten
1464. Brenner
1465. von Unge
1466. Bilberg
1467. Hederhielm
1468. Stedt
1469. Adelcrantz
1470. Henck
1471. Rydingsvärd
1472. de Briant
1473. von Stade
1474. Schenfelt
1475. Högger
1476. Riben
1477. Jegerhjelm
1478. von Burguer
1479. Ulfhielm
1480. Ridderstråle
1481. König
1482. von Hylteen
1483. Bousquet
1484. Enanderhielm
1485. Cederholm
1486. Sandberg
1487. Hoffman
1488. Rosenborg
1489. Rutensparre
1490. Brauner
1491. von Lindeblad
1492. Ridderstolpe
1493. Zander
1494. Schmoll
1495. Strömstierna
1496. Gathenhielm
1497. Riddergroll
1498. von Roepsdorff
1499. Lagercreutz
1500. Hjelmstierna
1501. Göthenstierna
1502. von Utfall
1503. von Bruse
1504. Stenflycht
1505. von Seth
1506. Stierngranat
1507. de Silentz
1508. Tham
1509. von Utfall
1510. Maull
1511. Cedersparre
1512. Fixenhielm
1513. Frisenheim
1514. Polhem
1515. Ehrenbill
1516. Gyllenschruf
1517. Linnerhielm
1518. von Witten
1519. von Döbeln
1520. Bergenstierna
1521. Jerlström
1522. Ratzwill
1523. Lindenstedt
1524. Lindsfelt
1525. von Tholijn
1526. Simzon
1527. Blosenhielm
1528. Gyllenram
1529. von Schulzenhielm
1530. Ridderheim
1531. Leijel
1532. Leijel
1533. Leijel
1534. Ankarcrona
1535. Fröberg
1536. von Hegardt
1537. Fägerhierta
1538. Falker
1539. Götherhielm
1540. Heldenhielm
1541. von Bocken
1542. Ehrensvärd
1543. Hederstierna
1544. Wagner
1545. von Reichenbach
1546. Wilsdorff
1547. von Greiff
1548. Hertz
1549. Möllerstierna
1550. Leijonbrinck
1551. von Wallwijk, unintroduced baronial and comital
1552. Palmhielm
1553. Hoffenstierna
1554. von Flygarell
1555. Dahlfelt
1556. Lilliestruss
1557. Drufva
1558. Starenfelt
1559. Palmencrona
1560. Celsing
1561. Fehman
1562. Cederbielke, unintroduced baronial
1563. Cederstråhle
1564. Segerberg
1565. Cedermarck
1566. Kröningssvärd
1567. Tigerström
1568. de Frumerie
1569. Silfvercreutz
1570. Borg
1571. Litheim
1572. Thimerhielm
1573. Linnercrantz
1574. Wetterstierna
1575. von Otter
1576. Ladau
1577. Zengerlein
1578. Rosenadler
1579. Lindencrona
1580. von Carlsson, unintroduced baronial
1581. Boneauschiöld
1582. Steuch
1583. Rudenschöld
1584. Mannercrona
1585. Blomfelt
1586. Raab
1587. von Seulenberg
1588. Rittercrantz
1589. Rosensparre
1590. von Gardemein
1591. Segersköld
1592. Lannerstierna
1593. Voltemat
1594. von Heijne
1595. Segerfelt
1596. von Bradke
1597. Friedenreich
1598. Swedenborg
1599. Ehrenlund
1600. Braunerhielm
1601. Cederfelt
1602. Gyllenbååt
1603. von Block
1604. Panso
1605. Palmcreutz
1606. Flach
1607. Meldercreutz
1608. Nordenstråle
1609. Uggelklo
1610. Adelhielm
1611. Dreffling
1612. Grundelstierna
1613. Gripenschütz
1614. von Roland
1615. Svedenheim
1616. Tilas
1617. Bergenadler
1618. Elgenstierna
1619. Dimborg
1620. Lagerborg
1621. von Lietzen
1622. Rosenstolpe
1623. Plantenstedt
1624. Bielkenhielm
1625. Ehrenadler
1626. Olivecrona
1627. Blixenstråle
1628. Benzelstierna
1629. Wulfcrona
1630. Lagerstolpe
1631. Svab
1632. Adlerheim
1633. Lindcreutz
1634. Hedersköld
1635. Adlerbaum
1636. Reuterskiöld
1637. Rudbeck
1638. von Strömborg
1639. von Sallern
1640. Cederflycht
1641. Silfverstedt
1642. Ridderstad
1643. Örncrona
1644. Löth-Örnsköld
1645. Strömhielm
1646. Stiernheim
1647. Borgenstierna
1648. von Bahr
1649. Segercrona
1650. von Segerdahl
1651. Schmilinsky
1652. Kunckel
1653. Reenstråle
1654. Pihlhielm
1655. Tornérhielm
1656. von Hökerstedt
1657. von Reichel
1658. Törnecreutz
1659. Svedenstierna
1660. Löweneck
1661. Carlheim (sedermera Carlheim-Gyllensköld
1662. Nordenfelt
1663. Möhlman
1664. Glansenstierna
1665. Lundeblad
1666. von Ebbertz
1667. Leijonadler
1668. Winter
1669. Hempel
1670. von Henel
1671. Lilliehorn
1672. Sternleuw
1673. von Ehrenclou
1674. Klingfelt
1675. Adlerbielke
1676. Jernfeltz
1677. Braunersköld
1678. Estenberg
1679. Stierncrona af Söderby
1680. Riddercrona
1681. Ehrenfalck
1682. Ehrenstam
1683. Lostierna
1684. von Goltz
1685. Rosengrip
1686. Wagenfelt
1687. Lundenstierna
1688. Cederstolpe
1689. Hoenstierna
1690. Riddercreutz
1691. von Castanie
1692. Östner
1693. Köppen
1694. Ehrensparre
1695. Cronsparre
1696. Bergenstråhle
1697. Nordencreutz
1698. Ehrenpåle
1699. Nordenheim
1700. Lindestolpe
1701. Ekenstierna
1702. Törnebladh
1703. Blomcreutz
1704. Arenhielm
1705. Ekesparre
1706. Silfverskog
1707. Adelswärd
1708. von Walden
1709. Sandelhielm
1710. von Gedda
1711. Dryssel
1712. von Nackreij
1713. von Boisman
1714. von Björnbourg
1715. Stenholm
1716. von Drake
1717. Fägerstråle
1718. Dalman
1719. Dagström
1720. Adlerfors
1721. Ingelotz
1722. von Wulffschmidt
1723. Günther
1724. Schulzendorff
1725. von Christiersson
1726. Marcks von Würtemberg
1727. von Burguer
1728. von Walcker
1729. Standaerhielm
1730. Weili
1731. von Scharin
1732. Adlerbeth
1733. von Bratt
1734. Gyllenecker
1735. von Caméen
1736. Hallenborg
1737. Bungencrona
1738. Kalitin
1739. Löwe (Löwen)
1740. Sprengtport
1741. Wolffelt
1742. von Schwartzer
1743. von Wachenfeldt
1744. Wendel
1745. von Conowen
1746. Brunhielm
1747. Wigelstierna
1748. Reuterstierna
1749. von Ehrenheim
1750. Hjelm
1751. Svedenhielm
1752. von Olthoff
1753. Hedenstierna
1754. Segerstierna
1755. von Scheven
1756. Preis
1757. Tallberg
1758. Löwenhult
1759. Ehrenmalm
1760. Reutercrona
1761. Strålenhielm
1762. Ehrenfelt
1763. Grüner
1764. Browald
1765. Adlerstråhle
1766. Segercrantz (sedermera Segercrantz af Såtevalla)
1767. Wallrawe
1768. Schmiterlöw
1769. Marschalck
1770. Wrangel af Sauss
1771. von Dellwig
1772. Brummer
1773. Rubzoff
1774. Berch
1775. von Schwerin af Spantekow
1776. von Drachstedt
1777. Toll
1778. Meck
1779. von Blixen
1780. von Bauman
1781. von Rehausen
1782. Gyllenqvist
1783. von Borneman
1784. von Drenteln
1785. von Düben
1786. Blomstedt
1787. von Yhlen
1788. Psilanderhielm
1789. Ridderhierta
1790. von Rosen
1791. Löwenhielm
1792. von Issendorff
1793. von Bromell
1794. von Hofsten
1795. Caménsköld
1796. Munsterhjelm
1797. von Törne
1798. Bruncrona
1799. von Scholten
1800. Fredenstierna
1801. Riddersven
1802. Hasenkampff
1803. von Baltzar
1804. Nordenborg
1805. Stiernspetz
1806. von Nolcken
1807. von Schwerin af Grellenberg
1808. Wiebel, unintroduced baronial
1809. von Freudenberg
1810. Stjernvall
1811. von Westerling
1812. Lindheim
1813. von Dittmer
1814. Nordenadler
1815. Nordenflycht
1816. Adlerstolpe
1817. Abrahamsson
1818. Bildensköld
1819. Stiernsparre
1820. Harenc
1821. von Cron
1822. Rühl
1823. Brandholtz
1824. von Törne
1825. Nordensvärd
1826. Franckenheim
1827. Strömcrona
1828. Cronhawen
1829. Dahlcrona
1830. von Schoting
1831. Ridderhof
1832. von Lang
1833. Klick
1834. von Willebrand, unintroduced baronial
1835. Törnrose
1836. von Korbmacher
1837. von Brehmer
1838. Kloo
1839. Ridderboll
1840. Trollenfelt
1841. von Heland
1842. Edenhielm
1843. von Buddenbrock
1844. von Nerès
1845. Hastfer
1846. Fock
1847. Maydell
1848. Virgin
1849. von Saltza
1850. Wrangel af Sage och Waschel
1851. Barohn
1852. von Segebaden
1853. Hertell
1854. von Böhnen
1855. Brummer
1856. de Frese
1857. von Törne
1858. von Engelhardt
1859. Wrangel af Fall
1860. von Lantingshausen
1861. von Hartmansdorff
1862. Ridderstedt
1863. von Marqvard
1864. Dahlstierna
1865. Löwenfels
1866. von Ganschou
1867. Stenfelt
1868. Morman
1869. von Stauden
1870. von Rappolt
1871. Ehrenpohl
1872. Wallencrona
1873. von Morian
1874. Jennings
1875. von Lingen
1876. Möllerheim
1877. Carleson
1878. Malmerfelt
1879. Rosenstam
1880. von Hauswolff
1881. Cronsvärd
1882. von Stenhagen
1883. Linderstedt
1884. Hummelhielm
1885. Arnell
1886. Adelheim
1887. Gerdesköld
1888. Wefverstedt
1889. Vult von Steijern
1890. Carlsköld
1891. Nordencrantz
1892. Löfvenskjöld
1893. von Stiernman
1894. von Blessingh
1895. von Kemna
1896. von Hermansson
1897. von Plessen
1898. Cunninghame
1899. Piper
1900. Ehrenschantz
1901. Olivecreutz
1902. Beijerhjelm
1903. von Rajalin
1904. Wallén
1905. von Rosen
1906. Engelcrantz
1907. Mannerhierta
1908. von Benning
1909. Zöge von Manteuffel
1910. Horn af Rantzien
1911. Psilanderskjöld, unintroduced baronial
1912. Nordenskiöld
1913. von Eggers, unintroduced baronial
1914. von der Lieth
1915. Pechlin
1916. von Rädeken
1917. Berg von Linde
1918. von Strussenfelt
1919. von Essen
1920. von Fieandt
1921. de Carnall, unintroduced baronial
1922. von Platen
1923. Ridderstam
1924. von Qvillfelt
1925. Ehrengranat
1926. Stålsvärd
1927. Hårleman
1928. Hercules
1929. von Björnmarck
1930. Wahlfelt
1931. von Eckstedt
1932. von Oldenskiöld
1933. Lagersvärd
1934. Kanefehr
1935. von Haren
1936. von Stockenström, unintroduced baronial and comital
1937. Rückersköld
1938. Alströmer
1939. Silfverstolpe
1940. Tersmeden
1941. von Schaeij
1942. von Hagelberg
1943. Bergenskjöld
1944. von Svab
1945. von Dalin
1946. von Östfelt
1947. Odencrants
1948. von Engeström
1949. von Kiörning
1950. Nordenstam
1951. von Aulæwill
1952. von Plomgren
1953. von Schening
1954. de Bruce
1955. von Oelreich
1956. Clementeoff
1957. von Essen
1958. von Stahlen
1959. von Kræmer
1960. Montgomery
1961. Ehrenstråhle
1962. von Göben
1963. von Matérn
1964. Pinello
1965. Ankarcrona
1966. von Holmer
1967. Rosencrantz
1968. Finlaij
1969. Gyllensvaan
1970. Schedvin
1971. Rosir
1972. Mackenzie af Macleod
1973. Segercrantz
1974. Granfelt
1975. Scheffer
1976. von Knorring
1977. Freijtag
1978. Paijkull
1979. Brakel
1980. Fredenheim
1981. Nordenstolpe
1982. Wallencreutz
1983. Heijkenskjöld
1984. Schützercrantz
1985. Nordenankar
1986. Spaldencreutz
1987. Lilliestråle
1988. Adlersparre
1989. le Febure
1990. Ferrner
1991. Skiöldebrand
1992. Lagerstråle
1993. Gripenbjelke
1994. Lillienanckar
1995. af Bjerkén
1996. af Palén
1997. Grewesmöhlen
1998. Schröderstierna
1999. Falkenstedt
2000. Adlerwaldt
2001. af Sillén
2002. Hisinger
2003. af Malmsten
2004. von Schulzenheim
2005. Gripenstråle
2006. Sandels
2007. Sköldarm
2008. af Stenhoff
2009. af Söderling
2010. af Geijerstam
2011. Liljencrantz
2012. Hiort af Ornäs
2013. Rosenblad
2014. Harmensen
2015. Gyllenstam
2016. Hallencreutz
2017. Björnstjerna
2018. af Forselles
2019. af Wanoch
2020. Conradi
2021. Hertzenhielm
2022. von Axelson
2023. Kjerrmansköld
2024. Stiernstam
2025. von Heidenstam
2026. af Sotberg
2027. Sernsköld
2028. Lütkeman
2029. Adelsköld
2030. von Deutschlender
2031. von Ziegler
2032. von Liphardt
2033. Balguerie
2034. Adlerbrandt
2035. Cederbaum
2036. von Stapelmohr
2037. Wallenstråle
2038. von Lagerlöf
2039. von Troil
2040. Sanderskiöld
2041. von Celse
2042. Cederstam
2043. Ihre
2044. von Linné
2045. von Rosenheim
2046. Schröderheim
2047. Rönnow
2048. von Stierneman
2049. Noringer
2050. von Reiser
2051. Furuhjelm
2052. Hultenheim
2053. Stjernswärd
2054. von Arbin
2055. Rosén von Rosenstein
2056. af Botin
2057. Adlerstam
2058. af Grubbens
2059. von Schéele
2060. Wettercrona
2061. Lagerbring
2062. af Dittmer
2063. Nordenfalk
2064. af Winklerfelt
2065. Fredensköld
2066. Hedersvärd
2067. Crusenstolpe
2068. af Darelli
2069. Mannerstråle
2070. Plommenfelt
2071. af Petersens
2072. Malmsköld
2073. Pollet
2074. Kjerrulf von Wolffen
2075. af Huss
2076. Hederstam
2077. von Wright
2078. Toll
2079. Almfelt
2080. von Konow
2081. Langenskiöld
2082. Mannerskantz
2083. von Born
2084. af Alnord
2085. von Köhler
2086. Ribben
2087. Salsvärd
2088. af Chapman
2089. af Enehielm
2090. Adelborg
2091. von Zansen
2092. Wrangel
2093. af Wetterstedt
2094. af Sandeberg
2095. Ehrenpalm
2096. von Röök
2097. von Francken
2098. Elfcrona
2099. von Kruus
2100. Segerstråle
2101. Hisingsköld
2102. Huusgafvel
2103. Baer
2104. Holmcreutz
2105. af Trolle
2106. Faxell
2107. Gustafschöld
2108. af Donner
2109. Anckarsvärd
2110. Printzenstierna
2111. af Ugglas
2112. Sjöholm
2113. Reuterstam
2114. Nordenswan
2115. Stiernefelt
2116. Bergenkloot
2117. af Thunberg
2118. Lagerheim
2119. Melanderhielm
2120. Nauckhoff
2121. von Jacobsson
2122. Lillienheim
2123. Sebalt
2124. Zibet
2125. von Hintzenstern
2126. Standertskjöld
2127. Segerheim
2128. von Platen
2129. af Låstbom
2130. af Acrel
2131. Orrsköld
2132. af Klercker
2133. de Bedoire
2134. Printzsköld
2135. Maule
2136. de Peijron
2137. von Carisien
2138. Rosenschütz
2139. Seton
2140. Anckarheim
2141. von Moltzer
2142. Liljensparre
2143. Stiernecreutz
2144. Rosensvärd
2145. af Nordin
2146. Bergencreutz
2147. af Cristiernin
2148. Risellschöld
2149. Krabbe
2150. von Hohenhausen
2151. Liljenstolpe
2152. af Uhr
2153. Edelcrantz
2154. Bérard
2155. Holmberg de Beckfelt
2156. Burenstam
2157. af Hasselgren
2158. von Tetzloff
2159. af Wingård
2160. Munck af Rosenschöld
2161. af Zellén
2162. af Flodin
2163. von Asp
2164. Wallquist
2165. Nordenstierna
2166. Dahlesköld
2167. af Puke
2168. Gedda
2169. von Stedingk
2170. Lidströmer
2171. Mouradgea d'Ohsson
2172. Lorichs
2173. af Schenbom
2174. von Langen
2175. von Sticht
2176. Lindersköld
2177. af Håkansson
2178. Edelsvärd
2179. Wärnhjelm
2180. Ankarsparre
2181. af Segerström
2182. Mannerstam
2183. Gripensvärd
2184. af Tibell
2185. af Klint
2186. von Wahrendorff
2187. von Kosboth
2188. af Klinteberg
2189. af Melin
2190. Helvig
2191. Edelcreutz
2192. Broberger
2193. Åkerstein
2194. Brändström
2195. Edelstam
2196. Wasastjerna
2197. af Strübing
2198. Löwenborg
2199. Bergstedt
2200. Hallenstjerna
2201. Schürer von Waldheim
2202. Möllerhjelm
2203. Zacco
2204. Gahn af Colquhoun
2205. Battram
2206. af Schultén
2207. af Leopold
2208. von Brinkman
2209. af Harmens
2210. af Lehnberg
2211. Börtzell
2212. Nordenbjelke
2213. Sergel
2214. Haak
2215. af Agardh
2216. Murray
2217. von Dardel
2218. von Weigel
2219. Rothoff
2220. af Ekenstam
2221. af Wirsén
2222. Wirsén
2223. Kantzow
2224. Palmsvärd
2225. Sylvander
2226. von Stedingk
2227. d'Orchimont
2228. von Breda
2229. af Ekstedt
2230. Hagströmer
2231. af Burén
2232. Fredenstam
2233. Ekorn
2234. Holmstedt
2235. von Cardell, unintroduced baronial
2236. af Schmidt
2237. Palin
2238. Tegmansköld
2239. von der Lancken von Wackenitz
2240. von Afzelius
2241. Clairfelt
2242. von Rosén
2243. Hadorph
2244. von Koch
2245. von Hedenberg
2246. von Stahl
2247. von Schulzen
2248. af Forsell
2249. Quiding
2250. Brandel
2251. af Brinkman
2252. Dorchimont
2253. von Holst
2254. af Malmborg
2255. af Pontin
2256. von Geijer
2257. Nordewall
2258. af Georgii
2259. af Wåhlberg
2260. af Kullberg
2261. af Borneman
2262. Hegardt
2263. von Lindecreutz
2264. von Schinkel
2265. af Robson
2266. Hochschild
2267. Edelcrona
2268. af Wannquist
2269. Björkenstam
2270. Hagelstam
2271. von Feilitzen
2272. von Diederichs
2273. Sjöcrona
2274. Nieroth
2275. Lefrén
2276. Berzelius
2277. Ljungsvärd
2278. af Callerholm
2279. af Tannström
2280. af Lefrén
2281. af Robsahm
2282. von Prinzencreutz
2283. Akrell
2284. af Gillner
2285. af Klintberg
2286. af Risells
2287. af Rolén
2288. af Lundblad
2289. Boy
2290. Gyllenheim
2291. Westring
2292. af Edholm
2293. von Heideman
2294. af Funck
2295. Boltenstern
2296. de Camps
2297. Tamm
2298. af Billbergh
2299. von Beskow
2300. Spenger
2301. af Jochnick
2302. Skogman, unintroduced baronial
2303. Peyron
2304. af Ekström
2305. von Sydow
2306. von Hennigs
2307. af Tuneld
2308. af Ström
2309. af Dalström
2310. Grip
2311. Rabenius
2312. Peijron
2313. Ekströmer
2314. von Tuné
2315. von Schinkel
2316. Ammilon
2317. Fåhræus
2318. Malmborg
2319. Westerstrand
2320. Åkerman
2321. Nerman
2322. Sandströmer
2323. Isberg
2324. Ericson
2325. Fåhræus
2326. Wærn
2327. Huss
2328. von Hall
2329. Thulstrup
2330. af Kleen
2331. Ros
2332. de Maré
2333. Oldevig
2334. Bohnstedt
2335. Reventlow
2336. von Möller
2337. von Malmborg
2338. Lovén
2339. Bennich
2340. Dickson
2341. Palander af Vega
2342. Wijk
2343. Pantzerhielm
2344. Hedin
2345. Berencreutz
2346. Gentzschein
2347. von Braun
2348. von Rosen af Kardina
2349. von Samson-Himmelstjerna
2350. Sandelhjelm

== Unintroduced nobility ==
The following unintroduced noble families are included in Kalender öfver i Sverige lefvande ointroducerad adel (1886–1899), Sveriges ointroducerade adels kalender (1912–1944), and/or Kalender över Ointroducerad adels förening (1935–), which are directories of the living (at the time of publication) unintroduced nobility in Sweden and/or the membership of Ointroducerad Adels Förening.

=== Princely families ===
- Bernadotte (Belgian princely title awarded to Prince Carl Bernadotte)
- Cantacuzino (boyar family, Russian princely title)

=== Ducal families ===
- D'Otrante (Napoleonic nobility)

=== Marquis families ===
- Joussineau de Tourdonnet (French nobility)
- Lagergren (Papal/Italian nobility)

=== Comital families ===
- Bernadotte of Wisborg (Luxembourgish title awarded to various members of the House of Bernadotte)
- Crapon de Caprona
- Fouché d'Otrante (Napoleonic nobility)
- von der Groeben (German nobility)
- von Hallwyl (Swiss nobility)
- Joussineau de Tourdonnet (French nobility)
- Lagergren (Papal/Italian nobility)
- Landsberg
- Moltke (German/Danish nobility)
- Moltke-Hvitfeldt (German/Danish nobility)
- de Paus (Papal/Italian nobility)
- von Platen zu Hallermund (German nobility)
- Révay (Hungarian nobility)
- Reventlow (Danish/German nobility)
- House of Stolberg (German nobility)
- Tolstoy (Russian nobility)
- von Trampe (German nobility)

=== Baronial families ===
- von Bonsdorff (Finnish nobility)
- von Bredow (German nobility)
- von Buddenbrock
- von Buxhoeveden
- Cronstedt
- von Grothusen
- von Gussich
- von Leithner
- von Mecklenburg
- von der Osten-Sacken
- von der Pahlen (Russian nobility)
- von Rosen (Hoch-Rosen)
- Rosenørn-Lehn (Danish nobility)
- von Strauss
- von Wangenheim
- de Wendel (Portuguese nobility)

=== Untitled noble families ===
- von Ahlefeldt
- von Ajkay
- von Arnold
- von Baumgarten
- Békássy de Békás
- von Below
- Berencreutz
- von Bonsdorff
- von Bornstedt
- von Braun
- Bratt från Brattfors
- de Bronikowsky
- Bukowski Bòncz
- Castenschiold
- Cederwald
- de Champs
- von Corswant
- von Delwig
- von Eckermann
- Ekestubbe
- von Elern
- Erdeös
- von der Esch
- von Euler-Chelpin
- Falkenskiold
- Fegræus
- von Feilitzen
- Flindt
- von Friedrichs
- von Gaffron und Oberstradam
- Gahn (of Colquhoun)
- von Gerber
- von Glehn
- Granath
- Green af Rossö
- von Greyerz
- Grill
- von der Groeben
- Grubbe
- von Hackman
- Hackman
- von Hackwitz
- Hajdukiewicz
- Halkiewicz
- von Harbou
- von Haugwitz
- von Heideken
- Heymowski
- Holck
- von Homeyer
- von Horn af Rantzien
- von Horn
- von Johnstone
- Kennedy
- Kepinski
- von Kieseritsky
- Kinding
- von Knorring
- von Kothen
- von Koenigsegg
- von Krassow
- Lahováry
- von der Lancken
- von Landwüst
- La vonius
- Linder
- von Löwenadler
- Lövenstierne
- von der Lühe
- von Malortie
- von Mecklenburg
- Michaelsen
- Mikulowski
- von der Mosel
- Munthe
- Murray
- Munsterhjelm
- von Mühlenfels
- von Nandelstadh
- de Neergaard
- von Normann
- Norrmén
- von Oppeln-Bronikowski
- Osváth (de Thorna)
- Ouchterlony
- Pantzarhielm
- Patek
- von Perner
- von Platen
- von Preen
- Priklonsky
- Przybyszewski
- Quarles von Ufford
- von Redlich
- von Reedtz
- von Rehbinder
- von Rennenkampff
- von Rettig
- Reutern
- Ridderståhle
- Robertson-Pearce
- de Ron
- von Rosen (Stralsund)
- Rosenörn-Lehn
- von Roth
- von Rothstein
- Rouget de St Hermine
- de Rzewuski
- Le Sage de Fontenay
- von Samson-Himmelstjerna
- von Schmaltz
- von Schmidten
- von Schoultz (Livland)
- von Schubert
- von Schultz
- von Schreeb
- Schürer von Waldheim
- von Schönberg
- Schönhoff (von Schöneman)
- Seaton
- von Segebaden
- Segerstråle
- von Stahl
- de 'Sigray
- Soltan
- Stjernblad
- von Syberg
- von Sydow
- Treschow
- von Urbanski
- von Uthmann
- von Vegesack
- Walleen
- Walterstorff
- von Weyhe
- von Weymarn
- Wleügel
- von Zweigbergk

== See also ==
- Swedish name
