= Hegardt (surname) =

Hegardt is a Swedish noble surname. Notable people with the surname include:

- Chris Hegardt (born 2002), American soccer player
- Margareta Hegardt (1932–2005), Swedish diplomat
