= Loberg =

Loberg or Løberg is a surname. Notable people with the surname include:

- Claes Loberg (born 1970), Swedish-born Australian technology entrepreneur and designer
- Dawn Loberg, American politician
- Edwin A. Loberg (1915-2004), American colonel
- Kristin Loberg, American ghostwriter
- Molly Loberg (born 1976), American historian and author
- Frode Løberg (born 1963), Norwegian biathlete
- Liv Løberg (born 1949), Norwegian politician
- Sverre Løberg (1905–1976), Norwegian politician
