= Cederquist =

Cederquist is a surname. Notable people with the surname include:

- John Cederquist (born 1946), American sculptor
- Poul Cederquist (1916–1993), Danish hammer thrower

== See also ==
- Cederqvist
