= Af Ugglas =

af Uglas is a Swedish surname, meaning 'of Owls'. Notable people with the surname include:

- Bertil af Ugglas (1934–1977), Swedish politician and elected official
- Caroline af Ugglas (born 1972), Swedish singer, artist and chorister
- Ludvig af Ugglas (1814–1880), Swedish politician and member of the upper house of the Parliament of Sweden
- Margaretha af Ugglas (1939-2026), Swedish former Moderate Party politician and Minister for Foreign Affairs
