= Lagerhjelm family =

Swedish noble family

Lagerhjelm
- Swedish noble family
- Country: Sweden
- Founded: 1668
- Current head: None
- Dissolution: 1991

The Lagerhjelm family (Swedish pronunciation: [lɑːgɛːrˈjɛːlm]) was a Swedish noble family.

== History ==
Founded as the Staffander family, the Lagerhjelm family that rose to prominence with Johan Staffander (1628–1680).

In 1668, the Lagerhjelm family was elevated to noble rank in the Kingdom of Sweden. It was associated with the Bofors Works in Karlskoga, where members of the family served as ironmasters.

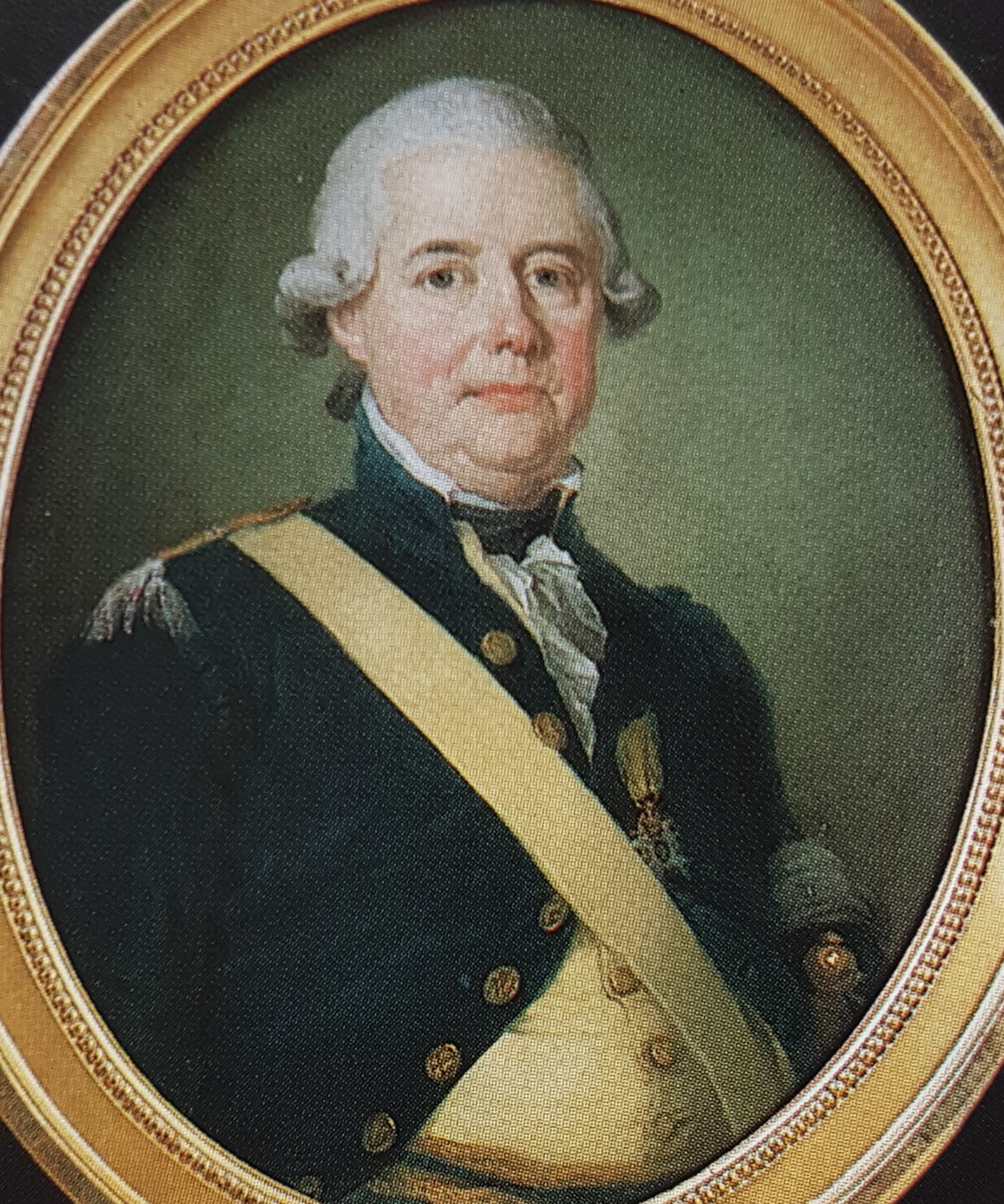
Per Lagerhjelm (1739–1805)

Ironmaster Pehr Lagerhjelm played a significant role in the history of Bofors Works in Karlskoga, where his contributions as a pioneering industrialist were widely recognized. Noted Karlskoga author Alf Bande acknowledges Lagerhjelm as one of the most prominent and influential figures in the history of the arms manufacturer Bofors.

In 1853, Lagerhjelm sold it to his sons Gustaf Reinhold and Per Erland Lagerhjelm. Per Erland Lagerhjelm procured more Lancashire hearths.

== See also ==
- List of Swedish noble families
