= Af Sillén =

af Sillén is a surname of Swedish origin. It is a noble family originating from Södermanland.

== People with the surname ==
- Anna af Sillén (born 1976), Swedish politician
- Edward af Sillén (born 1982), Swedish screenwriter and director
- Herman af Sillén (1857–1908), Swedish naval officer and painter

== See also ==
- List of Swedish noble families
- Sillen
