= Leuhusen =

Leuhusen is a Swedish baronial family. Members include:

- Adelaïde Leuhusen (1828–1923), a Swedish baroness, painter and concert singer
- Anna Leuhusen (died c. 1554), a Swedish Abbess of St. Clare's Priory in Stockholm
- Regner Leuhusen (1900–1994), Swedish Army lieutenant general
