= Spalding family =

Swedish noble family of Scottish origin

Spalding
- Swedish noble family
- Country: Sweden
- Origin: Scotland
- Founded: 1680
- Connected families: Spaldencreutz
- Dissolution: 1741

The Spalding family was a Swedish family originally from Scotland, a branch of the highland Scottish clan Spalding, whose members were elevated to the Swedish nobility.

== Overview ==
The Spalding family progenitor, Jakob Spalding, was a steward from Airlie, Angus. It is connected with the Spaldencreutz family.

Prominent figures include Carl Jacob Spalding who set up a business firm with Carl Appelroth.

== See also ==
- List of Swedish noble families

== Bibliography ==
- Anrep, Gabriel (1858). Svenska Adelns Ättar-Taflor: Skytte af Duderhoff - Östner, jemte Tillägg, Rättelser och Slutord (in Swedish). Vol. 4. P. A. Norstedt & Son̈er.
