= Kantzow family =

Kantzow
- Swedish noble family
- Country: Sweden

The von Kantzow family is the name of a noble family most likely from the German part of Pomerania, and is sometimes listed without the leading nobiliary particle von. This family gained noble status in Sweden in 1812, was declared to be of baron status in 1821, and was introduced in Sweden's House of Knights in 1822 as family no. 376.

The name von Kantzow or Kantzow may refer to:

- Carin von Kantzow (1888–1931), Swedish noblewoman
- Hans von Kantzow (1887–1979), Swedish engineer and inventor
- Nils von Kantzow (1885–1967), Swedish gymnast
- Sydney de Kantzow (1914–1957), Australian businessman
- Thomas Kantzow (1505–1542), Pomeranian scholar
