= Ekegren =

Ekegren is a surname, and may refer to:

- Anders Ekegren (born 1957), Swedish politician
- Björn Ekegren, Swedish sculptor, glass artist and painter

== See also ==
- Ekeler
