= Holmstedt =

Holmstedt is a surname of Swedish origin. Notable people with the surname include:

- Anna Sophia Holmstedt (1759–1807), Swedish ballet dancer and translator
- Janna Holmstedt (born 1972), Swedish artist
- Ragnar Holmstedt (20th century), Swedish footballer
