= Ihre =

Ihre may refer to:

== People ==
- Albrecht Elof Ihre (1797–1877), Swedish diplomat and politician
- Johan Ihre (1707–1780), Swedish philologist and historical linguist
- Thomas Ihre (1659–1720), Swedish theologist

== Other ==
- a German possessive pronoun.
