= Hammarberg =

Hammarberg is a Swedish surname. Notable people with the surname include:

- Irwin Goodman (1943–1991), Finnish singer (real name: Antti Hammarberg)
- Thomas Hammarberg (born 1942), Swedish diplomat
