= Belfrage =

Belfrage is a surname. Notable people with the surname include:

- Cedric Belfrage (1904–1990), British journalist, socialist, author and translator
- Clare Belfrage, Australian glass artist
- Bruce Belfrage (1900–1974), English actor and newsreader
- Erik Belfrage (1946–2020), Swedish diplomat and banking executive
- Frank Belfrage (born 1942), Swedish ambassador and politician
- Fredrik Belfrage (born 1949), Swedish TV and radio presenter
- Gustav Wilhelm Belfrage (1834–1882), American insect collector
- Henry Belfrage (1774–1835), Scottish theologian
- Nicolas Belfrage (born 1940), British wine writer
- Sally Belfrage (1936–1994), American writer and journalist
