= Skjöldebrand =

Skjöldebrand is a surname. Notable people with the surname include:

- Anders Fredrik Skjöldebrand (1757–1834), Swedish count
- Charlotta Skjöldebrand (1791–1866), Swedish court official
- Jonathan Skjöldebrand (born 1983), Swedish-Israeli basketball player
