= Teet =

Male given name

- Gender: Male
- Name day: 13 August

Origin
- Region of origin: Estonia

Other names
- Related names: Teedo, Teedu, Teetlev, Teeto

Teet is an Estonian masculine given name. People with the name Teet include:

- Teet Allas (born 1977), Estonian footballer
- Teet Helm (born 1959), Estonian politician
- Teet Jagomägi (born 1969), Estonian politician
- Teet Järvi (1958–2025), Estonian cellist
- Teet Kallas (born 1943), Estonian writer
- Teet Kask (born 1968), Estonian choreographer
- Teet Veispak (born 1955), Estonian historian
