= Cederschiöld =

Cederschiöld is a Swedish surname that may refer to:

- Carl Cederschiöld, Swedish politician
- Charlotte Cederschiöld (born 1944), Swedish politician
- Gunnar Cederschiöld (1887–1949), Swedish fencer
- Hugo Cederschiöld (1878–1968), Swedish officer and sports shooter
- Margareta Cederschiöld (1879–1962), Swedish tennis player, sister of Hugo
- Maria Cederschiöld (1856–1935), Swedish journalist and women's rights activist
- Maria Cederschiöld (deaconess) (1815–1892), Swedish deaconess and nurse
