= Gyldenär family =

Swedish noble family

Gyldenär is an extinct Swedish noble family, enrolled in Swedish House of Nobility with the number 388.

== Founder ==
The founder of the family was Johan Gyldenär, a major in a Finnish infantry regiment in the Swedish army. He came from Sweden but his father, Conrad Guldener, was from either Germany or the Netherlands. Johan was mentioned by the records for the first time in 1622 when he received Storhoplaks, Mäkkylä and Kilo in the Espoo Parish (Storhoplaks was then a part of Helsinki Rural Parish) in Finland from the Crown. He built the Alberga manor house in the village of Storhoplaks. In 1624, Alberga was created an allodial freehold estate. In 1628 he exchanged Mäkkylä for Träskända village (now the manor of Järvenperä) in the same parish. On 16 November 1646 Johan Guldener was ennobled with the name of Gyldenär and introduced in 1650 in the Swedish House of Nobility (Riddarhuset) with the number 388. In 1647, he was a major in the Viborg Infantry Regiment, which was sent to Riga. He was the commander of the Vargskär Fort in Helsingfors (Helsinki) in 1656 and 1658. He retired in 1664 with the rank of major and the thanks "for his gracious services of many years" (for sina hulda och långvariga tjänster). He died around 1685 at the age of 87 years. His wife was Elin Horn af Kankas, the daughter of the Royal Councilor Arvid Horn af Kankas from Finland (Family No. 12 in Riddarhuset) and his second wife, Ingeborg Iwarsdotter Stjernkors ( Family No. 39 ). They had three children.

== Daughters ==
Daughter Ingeborg was married twice – in 1654, to Lieutenant Antonius Creutzhammer ( Family No. 200 ), who died in 1657, and his cousin, Governor Friherre [ Baron ] Arvid Horn af Åminne ( Family No. 2 ) ( 1631 – 1692 ) but they were married without the permission from the King of Sweden so they were hauled to the Hovrätt, the Supreme Court of the Kingdom of Sweden, in Åbo ( now Turku, Finland ) for the punishment. Jully Ramsay believed that there was another daughter, Margaretha who married a Livonian noble, Hendrik Bergh, a Captain in the Viborg Cavalry Regiment, and who died before 1705.

== Sons ==
Anrep stated in 1861 that Johan had two sons, who followed him to the military but Ramsay, writing in 1909, believed that they were actually Johan's son and grandson. Johan's son, Arvid, rose through the ranks of the Swedish Army. He began in 1644 as a corporal in his father's old regiment, the Viborg Infantry Regiment, but, by 1655, he was a lieutenant in the Nyland (now Uusimaa, Finland) Cavalry Regiment. He was a major in 1665 and lieutenant colonel in 1669 with the cavalry of Colonel Kock von Crimstein. Then he was lieutenant-colonel in 1672 and colonel in 1677 with the cavalry of Count Leonhard Wittenberg. He finished as the commandant of Varberg in 1689. He died in 1710. He married Gertrud Dorothea Bergh of Livonian nobility but, in 1669, they separated. From her, he wrote that he had "for a long time endured great discomfort, contempt and injury" [ en lång tid bortåt utstått stort besvär, förakt och skada ]. According to Anrep, they had six children but Ramsay counted only five. Anrep wrote three of their four sons followed their father to the military but only one of them, Ernst (Ernst Arvid, according to Ramsay), a captain of infantry, had a wife and children. All his three sons also joined the army, but they all died as childless bachelors, so Arvid's branch became extinct in the male line

However, the line of Johan's other son, Anders Eric, survived. Ramsay identified him as Erik, the actual son of Ernst. But she agreed with Anrep on the basic facts of this man's life. Erik was Quartermaster with Colonel Fritz Wachtmeister's twin cavalry regiments in 1678 during its march to Prussia. Erik was a Captain-Lieutenant with the Åbo and Björneborg ( now Pori, Finland ) regiments of cavalry in 1694 and resigned his commission in 1701. He was still living as late as 1711. He also married into the nobility. His wife Catharina Ramsey was the daughter of cavalry captain Hans Ramsey (Family No. 215, founded by a Scottish immigrant ), whose estate of Pitkjerfvi ( now Pitkäjärvi, near Somero, Finland ) passed to Erik and his wife, and Anna Ljuster ( Family No. 111 ). But the couple had only one child, a son who became a cavalry officer in the Swedish Army on both sides of the Baltic Sea. He did marry and have children but his sons and grandsons kept joining the military and several of them died without any issue. By 1861, although there were already daughters, the branch of Anders Eric had dwindled to three elderly brothers, the sons of his great-grandson. and ultimately failed in the male line in 1875. However, Ramsey believed in 1909 that there still might be descendants living in Finland.

== Present ==
According to Statistics Sweden, there is no one who still bears the Gyldenär surname in Sweden in 2014.

== Coat-of-arms ==
The coat of arms of the Gyldenär family of Sweden is blue with a white chevron between three red roses.
