= Cronberg =

Cronberg is a surname. Notable people with the surname include:

- Tarja Cronberg (born 1943), Finnish Green League politician
- Fredrik Magnus Cronberg (1719–1728), Governor of Uppsala
- Walter von Cronberg (1477 or 1479–1545), Grand Master of the Teutonic Knights

== See also ==
- Kronberg im Taunus, German town
