= Vellingk =

- Otto Ottoson Vellingk (1649-1708) was a Swedish general during the Great Northern War
- Otto Vellingk (1687–1693), Governor of Västernorrland County
