= Edwin A. Loberg =

United States Air Force officer (1915–2004)

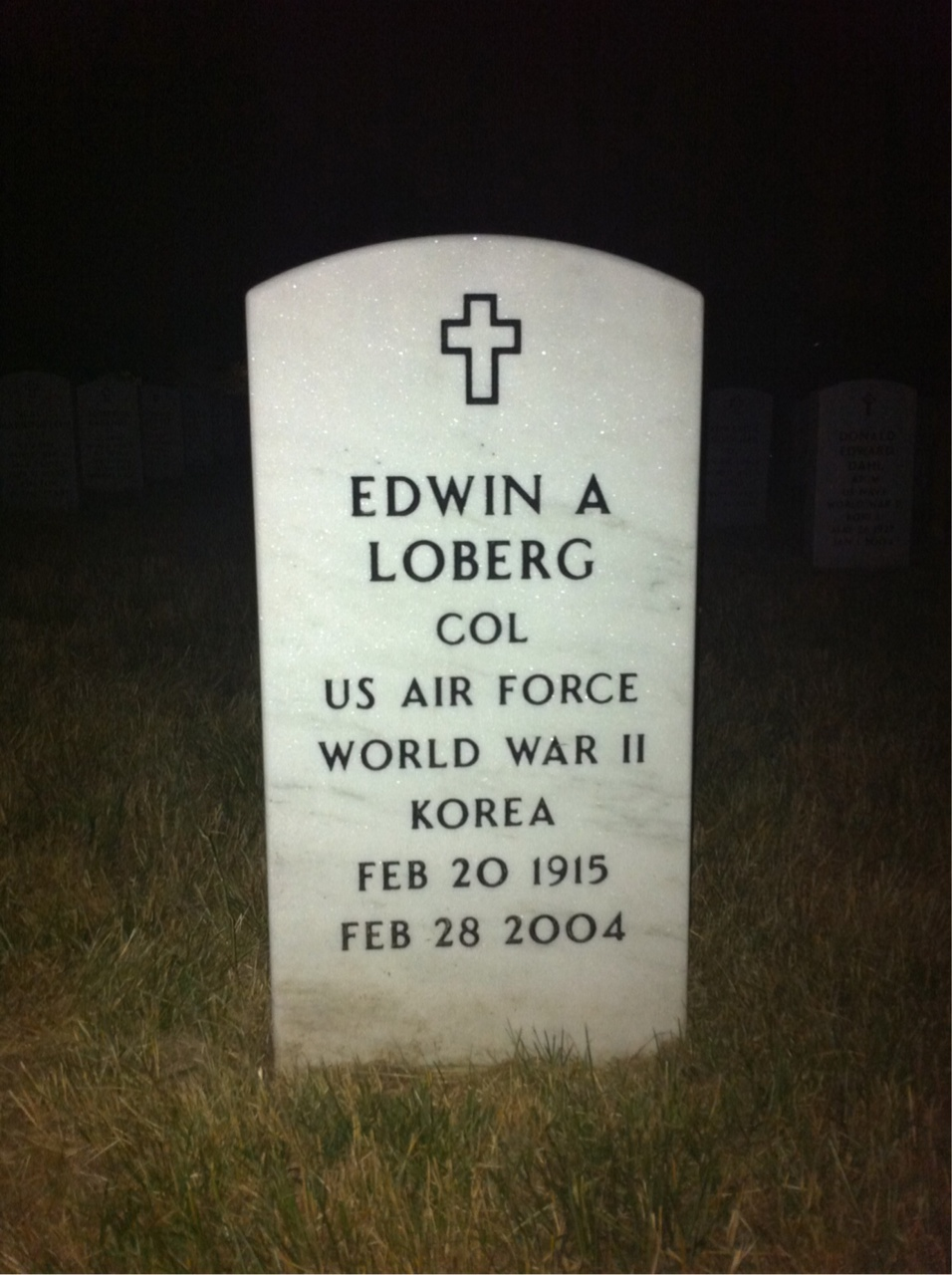
- Grave at Arlington National Cemetery
- Born: February 20, 1915; Tigerton, Wisconsin, US
- Died: February 28, 2004 (aged 89)
- Burial place: Arlington National Cemetery
- Military career
- Allegiance: United States
- Branch: United States Air Force
- Service years: 1941–1968
- Rank: Colonel
- Conflicts: World War II; Korean War
- Awards: Silver Star; Distinguished Flying Cross; Air Medal

Edwin A. Loberg (February 20, 1915 – February 28, 2004) was a colonel in the United States Air Force.

== Biography ==
A native of Tigerton, Wisconsin, Loberg was born on February 20, 1915. He graduated from what is now the University of Wisconsin-Stevens Point and married June Madsen and had 3 sons, 2 grand daughters. Loberg died on February 28, 2004, and is buried at Arlington National Cemetery.

== Career ==
Loberg first joined the United States Army Air Corps in 1941. After being commissioned an officer, he was assigned to the 26th Bombardment Squadron based at Hickam Field where he survived the Attack on Pearl Harbor on December 7, 1941. During World War II he piloted the Boeing B-17 Flying Fortress and the Boeing B-29 Superfortress. On October 23, 1942, Loberg engaged in a 45-minute-long dogfight against a Japanese Kawanishi H6K that was attacking a U.S. Navy patrol boat. As it is highly unusual for a bomber to engage in such action, the event garnered much attention and was featured in a book written by Ira Wolfert and was the subject of a painting entitled "An Interesting Dog Fight" by artist Stan Stokes. On June 15, 1944, Lt. Col. Loberg piloted the first plane over Yawata, Japan, flying "Pathfinder" for the entire mission. This mission was the first land-based plane bombing of the homeland of the Japanese Empire, and the first raid since the Doolittle Raid in April 1944. During the Korean War Loberg served as Deputy Chief of Staff of the War Planning Room of Strategic Air Command. Later assignments included serving at The Pentagon and as Chief of Staff of Bolling Air Force Base. He retired in 1968.

Awards he received include the Silver Star, the Distinguished Flying Cross, and the Air Medal.
