= Klingspor =

Klingspor is a Swedish surname and may refer to:

- Agneta Klingspor (1946–2022), Swedish author
- Alexander Klingspor (born 1977), Swedish painter and sculptor
- Count Wilhelm Mauritz Klingspor (1744–1814), Swedish noble military officer
- Klingspor Museum, Offenbach, Germany
- Klingspor Type Foundry, Germany

== See also ==
- Wilhelm Klingspor-Schrift, a typeface
