= Reuterskiöld =

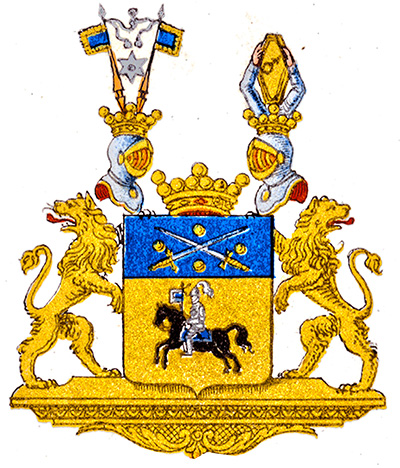
Coat of arms of the Reuterskiöld noble family

Reuterskiöld (pronounced [ˈrœ̂jtɛrˌɧœld]) is a Swedish surname, chiefly borne by a Swedish noble family. Notable people with the surname include:

- Adam Reuterskiöld (born 1966), Swedish politician
- Anette Reuterskiöld (1804–1880), Finnish writer and socialite
- Axel de Reuterskiöld (1860–1937), Swedish philatelist
- Carl Reuterskiöld (1923–2006), Swedish banker and engineer
- Casimir Reuterskiöld (1883–1953), Swedish sports shooter and military officer
- Gunnar Reuterskiöld (1893–1970), Swedish diplomat
