= Silfverstolpe =

Silfverstolpe is a Swedish noble surname. Notable people with the surname include:

- Gunnar Mascoll Silfverstolpe (1893–1942), Swedish poet and member of the Swedish Academy
- Lennart Silfverstolpe (1888–1969), Swedish tennis player
- Malla Silfverstolpe (1782–1861), Swedish writer and salon hostess
