= Rosenblad =

Rosenblad is a Swedish language surname, which mean "rose leaf". Notable people with the surname include:

- Carl Rosenblad (equestrian) (1886–1953), Swedish equestrian
- Carl Rosenblad (racing driver) (born 1969), Swedish auto racing driver
- Nils Rosenblad (1888–1981), Swedish Army major general
- Mathias Rosenblad (1758–1847), Swedish politician
