= Von Höpken =

Family of Swedish nobility

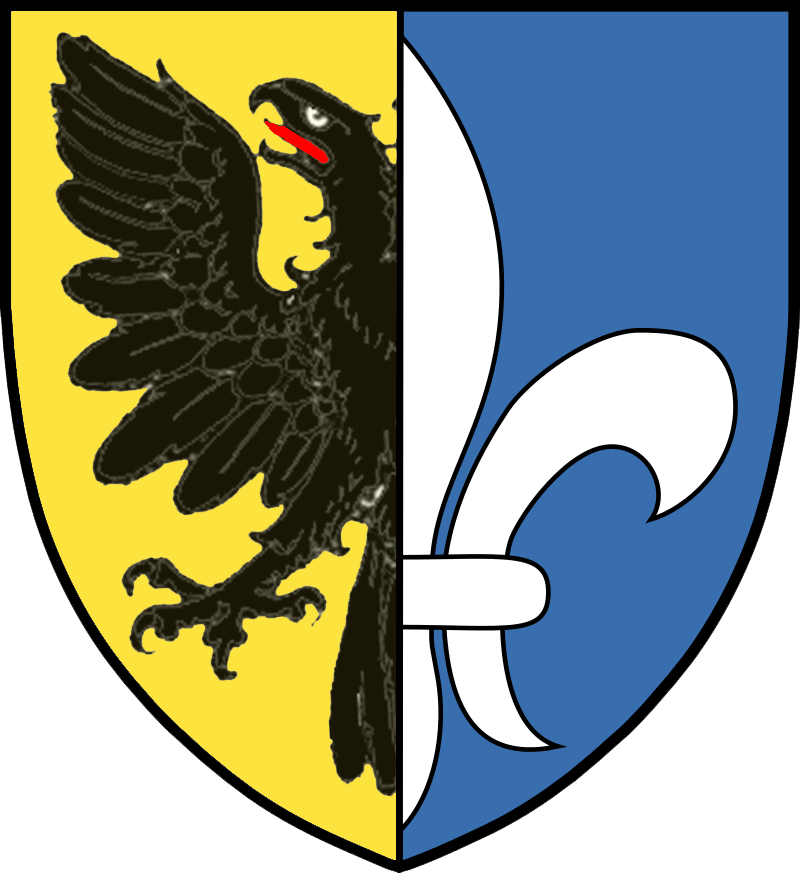
Original von Höpken coat of arms

Von Höpken is a family of Swedish nobility of English origin ("Hoepking"). It is matriculated into Swedish House of Nobility 1719 under number 1414. Daniel Niklas von Höpken was raised in the stand of Friherre, and matriculated 1720 under number 161. Bogesund Castle later belonged to this Baronial branch. One of Daniel Niklas' sons was Count Anders Johan von Höpken.

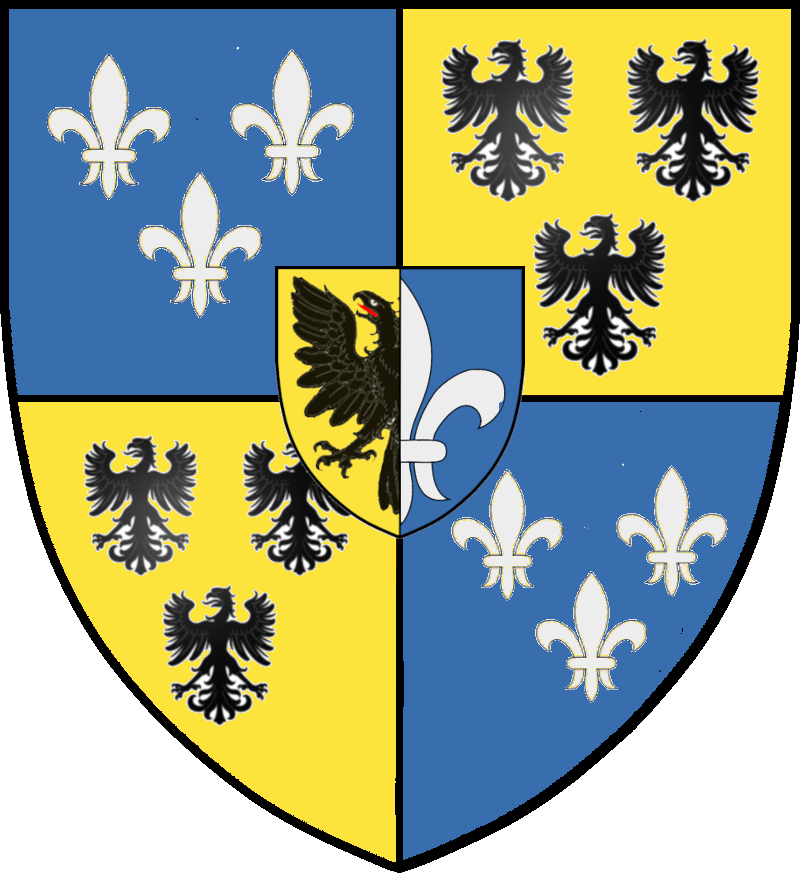
Baronet von Höpken coat of arms
