= Palmcrantz =

Palmcrantz is a Swedish noble family. Notable people with the surname include:

- Gert Palmcrantz (born 1938), Swedish sound engineer
- Helge Palmcrantz (1842–1880), Swedish inventor and industrialist
