= Sergel =

Sergel is a surname. Notable people with the surname include:

- Charles Sergel (1911-1980), British surgeon, missionary doctor and rower
- Christopher R. Sergel (1918-1993), president of the Dramatic Publishing Company and a Broadway playwright
- Johan Tobias Sergel (1740–1814), Swedish neoclassical sculptor
- Ruth Sergel, American director, writer, activist and interactive technology designer
