= Lenck =

Lenck is a surname of German origin. Notable people with the surname include:

- Georg Lenck (1685–1744), German musician
- Julius Lenck (1845–1901), Hungarian-German brewer and businessman
- Walter Lenck (1873–1952), German artist
