= Appelgren =

Appelgren is a Swedish surname.

Notable people with this surname include:

- Andreas Appelgren, Swedish ice hockey coach
- Brita Appelgren, Swedish film actress
- Chris Appelgren, American record label owner
- Frida Appelgren, Swedish music artist
- Mikael Appelgren, Swedish table tennis player
- Mikael Appelgren (handballer), Swedish handball player
