= Blomstedt =

Blomstedt is a Swedish surname. Notable people with the surname include:

- Georg Blomstedt (1872–1933), Swedish actor
- Henrik Blomstedt (1921–2009), Finnish lawyer and diplomat
- Herbert Blomstedt (1927–2026), Swedish conductor
- Jussi Blomstedt (1908–1985), Finnish conductor
- Kaarlo Blomstedt (1880–1949), Finnish historian and archivist
- Pauli E. Blomstedt (1900–1935), Finnish architect
- Yrjö Blomstedt (1926–1994), Finnish historian
