= Fåhraeus =

Fåhraeus, Fåhræus, or Fahraeus is a Swedish surname. It can refer to:

- Christer Fåhraeus (b. 1965), Swedish inventor
- Edvard Fåhræus (1828-1867), Swedish statistician
- Eskil Sanno Fåhraeus (1817-1900), Swedish politician
- Fredrik Fåhræus (1862-1936), Swedish priest
- Henrik Fåhræus (b. 1973), Swedish game designer
- Fredrik Fåhræus (1796-1865), Swedish politician
- Klas Fåhraeus (1863-1944), Swedish writer and parent of Robin Fåhræus
- Lars Fåhraeus (1762-1789), musician
- Laura Fåhræus (1803-1875), Swedish philanthropist
- Olof Fåhræus (1796–1884), Swedish politician and entomologist
- Rikard Fåhraeus (b. 1968), Swedish sculptor
- Robin Fåhræus (1888-1968), Swedish pathologist and hematologist
- Rolf Fåhræus (1905-1989), Swedish gynecologist
- Rudolf Fåhræus (1865-1950), Swedish historian

== See also ==
- Fåhræus effect, named for Robin Fåhræus
- Fåhræus–Lindqvist effect, also named for Robin Fåhræus
- Fahraeusia and Fahraeusiella, genera of beetles named for Olof Immanuel von Fåhraeus
