= Breitholtz =

Breitholtz is a surname. Notable people with the surname include:

- Daniel Breitholtz (born 1977), Swedish record producer
- Mirja Breitholtz, Swedish songwriter and producer
