= Rappe =

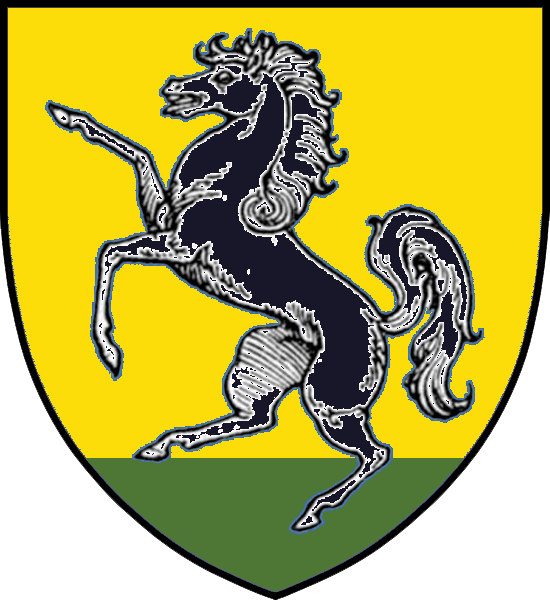
Heraldic shield of the Swedish Rappe family

Rappe or Rappé is a surname. It may refer to:

== People ==
- Baron Axel Rappe (1838–1918), a Swedish military officer
- Baron Axel Rappe (1884–1945), a Swedish military officer
- Baron Carl Johan Rappe (1918–2010), Swedish diplomat
- Emmy Rappe (1835–1896), a Swedish nurse
- Jadwiga Rappé (1952–2025), a Polish operatic contralto
- Louis Amadeus Rappe (1801–1877), a French-born bishop of the Roman Catholic Church
- Martin Rappe (born 1993), a German figure skater
- Thorborg Rappe (1832–1902), a Swedish pedagogue and Baroness
- Virginia Rappe (1891–1921), an American model and silent film actress
