= Nerman =

Nerman may refer to:

- Nerman, Iran, a village in Fars Province
- Nerman Fatić (born 1994), Bosnian tennis player
- Birger Nerman (1888–1971), Swedish archaeologist and writer
- Einar Nerman (1888–1983), Swedish artist
- Ture Nerman (1886–1969), Swedish socialist politician and activist

== See also ==
- Nerman Museum of Contemporary Art, art museum in Kansas, United States
