= Björn Ekegren =

Swedish sculptor, glass artist and painter

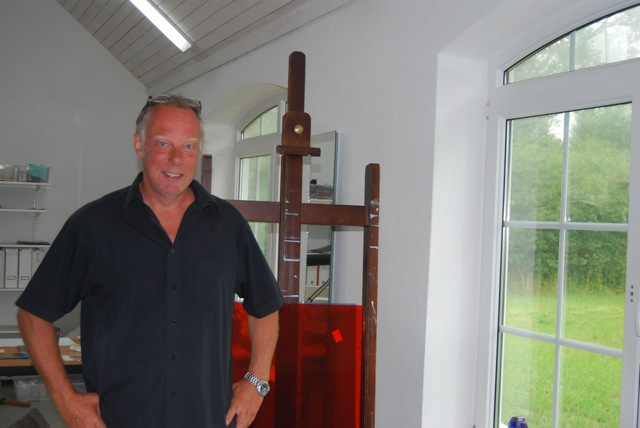
- Björn Ekegren in his studio in Höganäs, Skåne in Sweden
- Born: August 26, 1955 (age 69); Askim, Gothenburg, Sweden

Björn Ekegren (born August 26, 1955), is a Swedish sculptor, glass artist and painter who primarily works with sand cast glass art.

== Early life ==
Björn Ekegren was born in Askim, Gothenburg in Sweden and at the age of 5 moved to Saltsjöbaden outside of Stockholm where he grew up. Björn Ekegren is one of six siblings.

== Life and art ==
Between 1970 and 1993 Björn Ekegren painted and produced primarily aquarelles and lithographies in a naturalistic, almost impressionistic style, where light and atmosphere where important in conveying the shifting seasons.

After educating himself on glass molding techniques Björn Ekegren turned to sculpturing. His primary medium is glass, but also bronze. Björn Ekegren's sculptures are created using a sand casting technique similar to the one used by the Ancient Egyptians. The colours, such as blue, turquoise and ochre, are inspired by the Mediterranean. The sculptures bridge the disparate art glass traditions and influences to create a unique form of expression. Often they carry the shape of faces and statues - meditative, sacral and worshipping of freedom. Björn Ekegren is known as a pioneer among Swedish glass artists for originating new casting techniques and uses of materials in combination with glass.

Björn Ekegren lives in Höganäs, Skåne, where he also has his studio. His sculptures are primarily produced in his own studio and at Bergdala glasbruk in Småland, a province in southern Sweden with a long heritage of creating art glass. At the glassworks, Björn Ekegren has four masters from Bergdala glasbruk at his assistance.

== Exhibitions ==
Björn Ekegren has displayed his work at several galleries and exhibitions around the US and Europe.

== Sources ==
- "About Björn Ekegren". bjornekegren.com. Archived from the original on 14 August 2011.
- Swedish artists, read 2011-07-06
- "Han bygger drömhus kring sitt glas". Helsingborgs Dagblad. Archived from the original on 2012-10-25.
- "Glas med överraskningar". Helsingborgs Dagblad. Archived from the original on 2012-10-25.
- Gnistrande skönhet i Chamberts galleri, read 2024-07-14
- Brothers in art, read 2024-07-14
