= Linderoth =

Linderoth is a Swedish surname. Notable people with the surname include:

- Anders Linderoth (born 1950), Swedish footballer and manager
- Betty Linderoth (1822–1900), Swedish watchmaker
- Tobias Linderoth (born 1979), Swedish footballer
