= Von Rothstein =

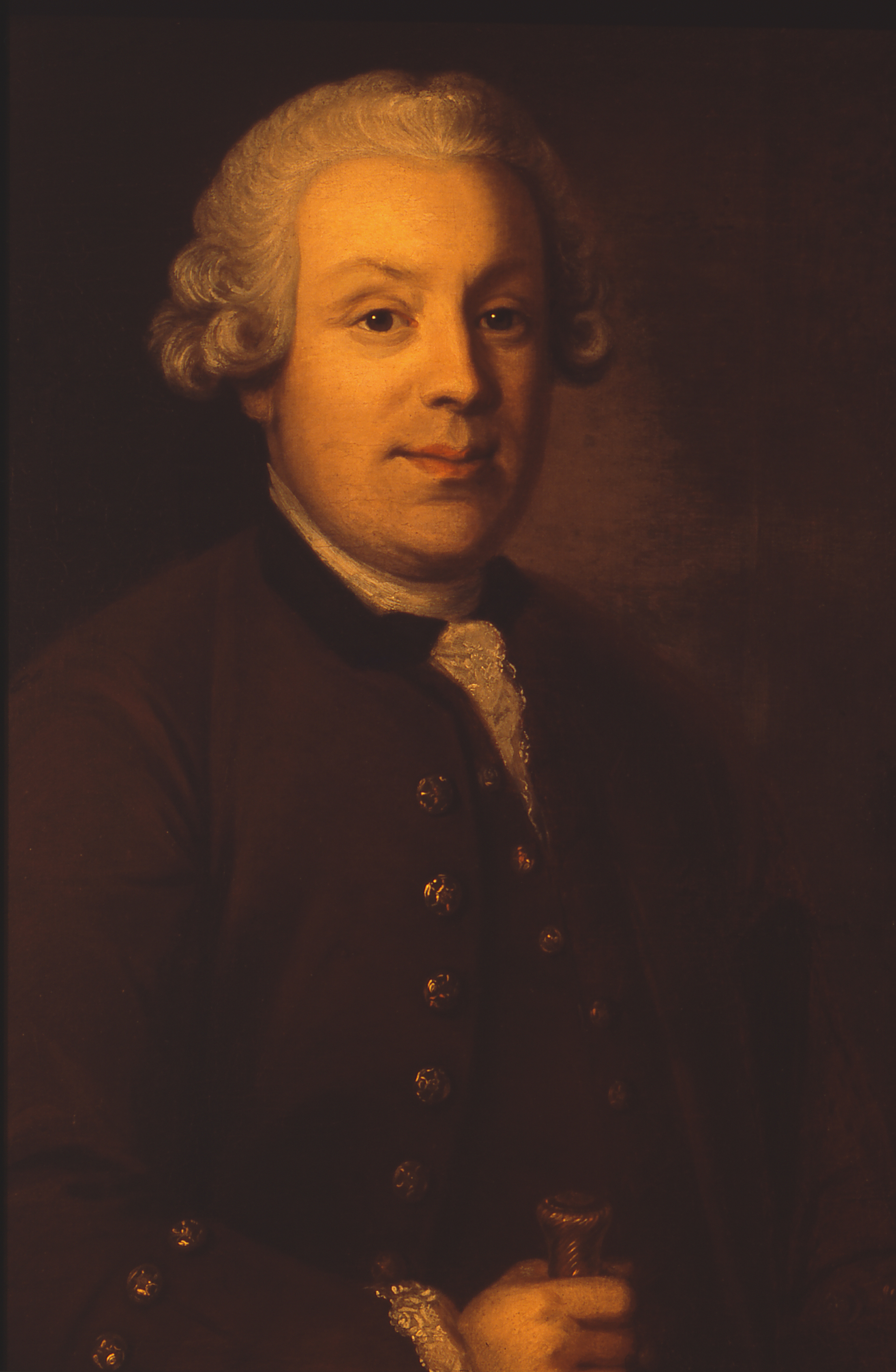
Simon Peter von Rothstein

The Rothstein family is a Swedish noble family, most probably of German origin, traceable to Alingsås in the 17th century.

== History ==
In 1714, the orphan Anders Rothstein (1698–1772) settled in Stockholm where he entered the service of tradesman Olof Höckert. He later became a city councillor and representative of the city in the national diet 1751-1752 and 1760–1762. His son, merchant Simon Petter Rothstein (1730–1806) was ennobled in 1782 by Joseph II, Holy Roman Emperor with the name von Rothstein. The family has never been "introduced" in Sweden (i.e. naturalised as Swedish nobility), and thus is considered unintroduced nobility. The architect Edvard von Rothstein (1821–1890) was a member of this family, as is Niclas von Rothstein, the editor of the most recent edition of the Swedish almanach of unintroduced nobility.
