= Ludvig af Ugglas =

Swedish politician (1814–1880)

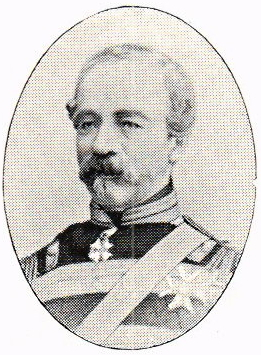
- Born: Carl Ludvig Fredrik af Ugglas; 11 August 1814; Forsmark
- Died: 23 March 1880 (aged 65)
- Citizenship: Swedish
- Spouses: Charlotta Antoinetta, Baroness von Düben

Ludvig af Ugglas (11 August 1814 – 23 March 1880) was a Swedish politician and member of the upper house of the Parliament of Sweden.

== Early life ==
Ludvig af Ugglas was born at Forsmark in Uppland, Sweden, the son of Count Pehr Gustaf af Ugglas. He was as a member of the noble af Ugglas family.

== Political career ==
From 1840 to 1866 he served as member of the Riksdag of the Estates. In 1867, when the political system changed from a feudal assembly, he was then elected a member of the upper house of the then bicameral Riksdag.
