= Skogh =

Skogh is a Swedish surname. Notable people with the surname include:

- Marita Skogh (born 1956), Swedish sprint canoer
- Wilhelmina Skogh (1849–1926), Swedish hotel manager
