= Ruuth =

Ruuth is a surname of Finnish origin. Notable people with the surname include:

- Ilari Ruuth (born 1990), Finnish footballer
- Elli Ruuth (1893–1975), Finnish furniture architect
- Eric Ruuth (1746–1820), owner of Marsvinsholm Castle
- Risto Ruuth, Finnish musician
