= Crafoord =

Crafoord is a Swedish surname. Notable people with the surname include:

- Carl-George Crafoord (1921–2006), Swedish diplomat
- Clarence Crafoord (1899–1984), Swedish cardiovascular surgeon
- Göran Crafoord (born 1939), Swedish sailor
- Greta Crafoord (born 2000), Swedish pair skater, twin sister of John
- Holger Crafoord (1908–1982), Swedish industrialist
- John Crafoord (born 2000), Swedish pair skater, twin brother of Greta
- Josefin Crafoord (born 1973), Swedish television and radio host
- Wille Crafoord (born 1966), Swedish musician

== See also ==
- Crafoord Prize
- Crawford (disambiguation)
