= Rühl =

Rühl or Ruehl (in Denmark the name is predominantly written as Ryhl since the latter half of the 19th century) is a surname of Germanic origin. It may refer to:

- Carl-Heinz Rühl (1939–2019), German football player and manager
- Fritz Rühl (1836–1893), Swiss entomologist
- Johan Rühl (1885–1972), Netherlands Olympic water polo player
- Markus Rühl (born 1972), German professional bodybuilder
- Mercedes Ruehl (born 1948), American theater and film actress, sister of Peter Ruehl
- Peter Ruehl (1947–2011), American-born Australian newspaper columnist
- Philippe Rühl (1737–1795), German-French statesman
