= Janna Holmstedt =

Swedish artist (born 1972)

- Born: 1972 (age 52–53); Gothenburg, Västergötland, Sweden
- Education: Academy of Fine Arts, Umeå (MFA)
- Occupation: Artist
- Website: www.jannaholmstedt.com

Janna Holmstedt (born 1972 in Gothenburg) is a Swedish artist based in Stockholm. She earned her MFA from the Umeå Academy of Fine Arts in 2004, and her recent awards include artist-in-residence at the Bemis Center for Contemporary Arts in Omaha, Nebraska (2007), the IASPIS International Exchange (2006), a Swedish Visual Arts Fund Project Grant (2005), NIFCA Nordic Air Residency in Tallinn, Estonia (2005) and two grants from the JC Kempes Foundation (2003/2004). Together with Po Hagstrom, Holmstedt is part of artist duo Trial and Error , working with projects related to national identity and the use of public space. Holmstedt also co-founded SQUID , an online project which facilitates a space for the parallel knowledge that emerges from an investigative, creative process.

Janna Holmstedt works with image, text, video and installation, usually in relation to a specific site and/or situation. She employs storytelling as a tool for critical engagement and as a way to deal with and make sense of the constant flow of information in everyday life. In her work, she seeks to situate a subject within a context that is not framed as an absolute truth or stable reality, but rather as a system that unfolds through a specific network where meanings are constructed. In her video- and sound installations involving voice-overs, Holmstedt focuses on the tension between an existentially defined "inner" space and that which we typically perceive as an "outer" space of politics and everyday life. She finds the borderland where these two fields meet, collide and interact - that is, where our sense of individuality and reality is represented - as the most interesting to investigate.

== Web based Projects ==
=== Trial and Error ===
external website Collaboration with Po Hagström, ongoing since 2005. Trial and Error work with projects related to national identity and the use of public space. The duo was formed in 2005 when the project ”Monument for the Masses” was first conceived, this in response to a huge monument which is going to be erected in Tallinn, Estonia. Trial-and-error is a method for solving problems and obtaining knowledge. Holmstedt and Hagström use it to scrutinize situations and concepts they find intriguing. The online project ”Monument for the Masses” consists of a proposal for a counter-monument to the city of Tallinn and a campaign to gain support for the proposal. At the website you find articles about how national heroes are constructed; French identity-soup; nation branding; the privatisation of public space; ruin value; the protests among the Taino people against a monument to Columbus in Puerto Rico, and much more. It is also possible to contribute to the Park for (Un)wanted Sculptures . This virtual sculpture park has been inspired by the Szobor Park in Hungary and is a growing archive of public art that for different reasons is unwanted. "Monument for the Masses" was exhibited at Tallinn City Gallery , Estonia, Sep-Oct, 2006. The online project is represented at Rhizome.org at the New Museum of Contemporary Art , New York.

=== SQUID ===
external website Collaborative project with Katja Aglert , ongoing since 2004. SQUID is a text focused project which aims to make cultural producers’ substantial knowledge available to a wider audience. Artists, writers, curators, philosophers among others from different countries are continually being invited to write in relation to the engagement and interests which runs through, or parallel to their own work. SQUID focuses on the local experiences derived from diverse individual or collective practices and isn't necessarily limited to being a discussion of art per se. SQUID can be seen as an expanding archive on the internet but also an initiator of public events such as for example readings, open talks etc. SQUID has been invited to Tensta konsthall , ak28 and Ersta konsthall in Stockholm and to the Russian magazine Chto delat?/What is to be done? , which is part of the Documenta Magazine Project . SQUID is also represented in Collaborative Practice Archive, Shedhalle, Zürich and Traveling Magazine Table , which was initiated by the art collective Nomads & Residents (Bikvanderpol and Cesare Pietrousti) in 2001. Bik van der Pol. nomads+residents

== Publications ==
- To turn one's anus towards the sun and say "GO"!", Chto delat? / What is to be done?, no 16, Mar 2007 (with Katja Aglert)
- Some Day They’re Gonna Name A Street After Me, Estonian Art, no 2:2006 (with Po Hagström)
- Vad du ser är inte vad du får, Paletten, #266 / no 4:2006
- Are you Willing to Get stupid?, CHTO DELAT
- Home of the Safe and Short-circuited Security Systems, text for AUPG and the collaborative project We Invite All at Rooseum, Malmö, 2005 and BildMuséet, Umeå, 2006 (with Lisa Bäckman)
- The Layers, the Camouflage, the Detective and the Reference Points / Lagren, kamouflaget, detektiven och hållpunkterna, exhibition catalogue Graduation Show 2003, Academy of Fine Arts, Umeå University, Sweden
- 110 dagar, Glänta, vol. 3-4:2002
