= Von Bahr =

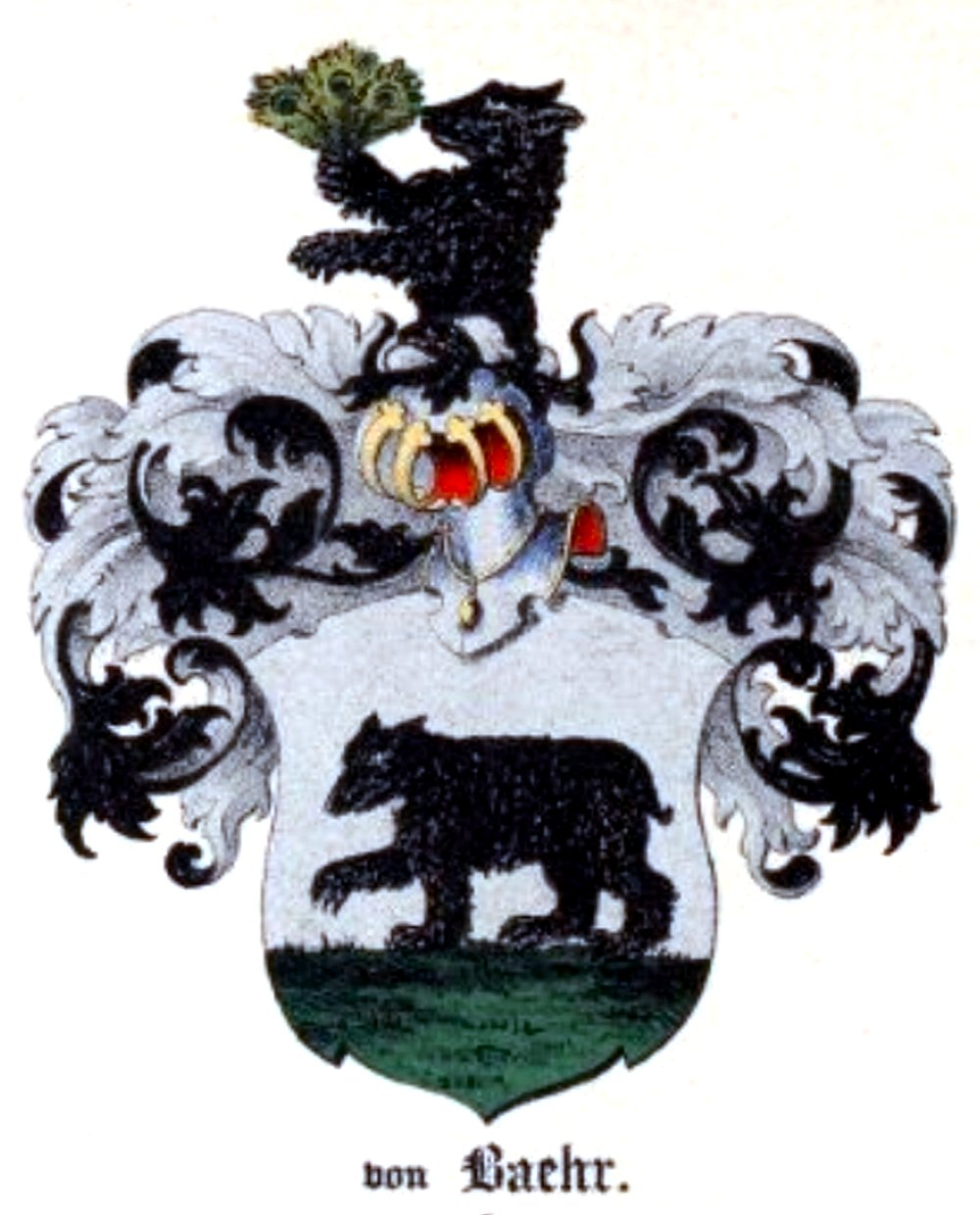
Coat of Arms of the Bahr family, Sweden (1882)

von Bahr is a name of Swedish noble family from Stralsund of German origin, hailing from Pomerania. The family was ennobled in Sweden in 1719.

== Notable members ==
- Eva von Bahr (1874–1962), Swedish physicist and teacher
- Eva von Bahr (make-up artist) (born 1968), Swedish make-up and hair stylist
- Margaretha von Bahr (1921–2016), Finnish ballet dancer and choreographer
- Niki Lindroth von Bahr (born 1984), Swedish director and animator
- Stig von Bahr (born 1939), Swedish lawyer

== See also ==
- Bahr (surname)
