= Ridderhof =

Ridderhof is a surname. Notable people with the surname include:

- Jenny Ridderhof (1936—2014), Dutch tennis player
- Joy Ridderhof (1903–1984), American missionary
- Mark Ridderhof (born 1989), Dutch basketball player
- Stanley E. Ridderhof (1896–1962), American naval aviator
