= Löwenhielm =

Löwenhielm is a surname. Notable people with the surname include:

- Augusta Löwenhielm (1754–1846), Swedish countess and courtier
- Carl Löwenhielm (1772–1861), Swedish military officer, diplomat, and politician
- Carl Gustaf Löwenhielm (1790–1858), Swedish diplomat and lieutenant general
- Fredrik Löwenhielm (1916–2008), Swedish major general
- Gustaf Löwenhielm (1771-1856), Swedish general and diplomat
- Jacquette Löwenhielm (1797–1839), Swedish noble and lady-in-waiting
- Michelle Löwenhielm (born 1995), Swedish ice hockey player

== See also ==
- Löwenhielm family
