= Westring =

Westring is a Swedish surname. It may refer to:

- Claes Westring (1893–1975), Swedish diplomat
- Gustaf Adolf Westring (1900–1963), Swedish Air Force officer
- Niklas Westring (1797–1882), Swedish entomologist and arachnologist
