= Malmborg =

Family name

Malmborg is a Swedish surname. Malmborg means "Ore Castle" in Swedish, with malm meaning ore and borg meaning castle. The look of a borg however, is closer to a fortress or a stronghold than a castle.

Borg could also reference a mountain, so the name would then be "the village in which ore is mined", or "the mountain where we mine ore".

Malmborg may refer to:

- Oscar Malmborg (1820–1880), Mexican war veteran
- Linus Malmborg (1988–present), Swedish footballer
