= Grundel =

Grundel is a surname. Notable people with the surname include:

- Anton Grundel (born 1990), Swedish ice hockey player
- Heinz Gründel (born 1957), German footballer
- Kalle Grundel (born 1948), Swedish rally driver

== See also ==
- Simon Grundel-Helmfelt (1617–1677), Swedish military officer and governor
