= Lagerstrom =

Lagerstrom or Lagerström is a surname. Notable people with the surname include:

- Alexander Lagerström (born 1991), Swedish ice hockey player
- Oscar Lagerstrom (1890–1974), American sound engineer
- Paco Lagerstrom (1914–1989), American mathematician and engineer
- Tony Lagerström (born 1988), Swedish ice hockey player
- Victoria Lagerström (born 1972), Swedish singer and beauty pageant winner
