= Kirstein =

Kirstein is a German surname. Notable people with the surname include:

- Georg Heinrich Kirstein (1858–1921), German Roman-catholic bishop in Mainz
- Lincoln Kirstein (1907–1996), American writer, impresario, art connoisseur and cultural figure
- Louis E. Kirstein (1867–1942), American businessman and philanthropist.
- Peter Kirstein
  - Peter T. Kirstein (1933–2020), British computer scientist
  - Petrus Kirstenius (1577–1640) German physician and orientalist
- Roland Kirstein (born 1965), German economist
- Rosemary Kirstein, American writer

== See also ==
- Kirstein Building
