= Schröderheim =

Schröderheim is a surname. Notable people with the surname include:

- Anna Charlotta Schröderheim (1754–1791), Swedish noble and salonist, wife of Elis
- Elis Schröderheim (1747–1795), Swedish politician
