= Hierta =

Hierta is a surname. Notable people with the surname include:

- Anna Hierta-Retzius (1841–1924), Swedish women's rights activist and philanthropist, daughter of Lars
- Lars Johan Hierta (1801–1872), Swedish newspaper publisher, social critic, businessman, and politician

== See also ==
- Huerta (surname)
