= Von Rajalin =

Extinct Swedish noble family

von Rajalin was a Swedish noble family of Finnish origin, which descended from admiral Thomas von Rajalin (1673–1741). Baron Salomon von Rajalin (1757–1825) was admiral and the governor of Swedish colony of Saint Barthélemy in Caribbean. The family became extinct in 1826.
