= Björnstjerna =

Björnstjerna is a surname. Notable people with the surname include:

- Carl Björnstjerna (1886–1982), Swedish horse rider
- Magnus Björnstjerna (1779–1847), Swedish general
- Oscar Björnstjerna (1819–1905), Swedish diplomat and politician

== See also ==
- Wallenberg family
