= Boose =

Boose is a surname. Notable people by that name include:

- James Rufus Boosé (1859–1936) travelling commissioner for the Royal Colonial Institute.
- Dorian Boose (1974–2016), American football player.
- Terry Boose (born 1956), Republican member of the Ohio House of Representatives.
