= Paykull =

Paykull, also spelled Paydkull, Paytkull, Paiküll, Paijkull, Pajkul or Paykel is a Swedish-Livonian/Estonian/Baltic German family name. It may refer to:

- Göran Paijkull (1605–1657), Swedish soldier and riksråd
- Otto Arnold von Paykull (1662–1707), Livonian general and alchemist
- Gustaf von Paykull (1757–1826), Swedish Marshal of the Court, ornithologist and entomologist
- Wilhelm Paijkull (1836–1869), geologist, chemist
- Carl Wilhelm Paijkull
- Gunilla Paijkull
