= Joussineau de Tourdonnet =

French noble family

House of Joussineau de Tourdonnet
- Family coat of arms
- Country: France
- Current region: Limousin
- Founded: 12th century
- Historic seat: Tourdonnet, Saint Priest Ligoure, Haute Vienne
- Titles: Marquis of Tourdonnet; Count of Joussineau de Tourdonnet

The House of Joussineau de Tourdonnet is a French noble family from Limousin dating back to the 12th century.

The Joussineau de Tourdonnet family is a surviving family of the French nobility, originating in Limousin. It is classified as a family of knightly extraction (noblesse d'extraction chevaleresque), with a documented noble lineage dating to 1366, and was maintained in its nobility in 1667.

Earlier genealogical works trace the family's origins to the Fressinet family, members of which are mentioned from the 12th century in documents relating to Vigeois Abbey. The name Joussineau appeared during the 13th century and gradually replaced Fressinet. The family later took the name of the lordship of Tourdonnet, situated in present-day Saint-Priest-Ligoure, Haute-Vienne.

Members of the family served as officers in the French royal army, as clergymen and in positions at the royal court. The family was admitted to the Honours of the Court (Honneurs de la Cour) during the 18th century.

== History ==
=== Origins ===
The genealogist Nicolas Viton de Saint-Allais, in his Nobiliaire universel de France, traces the family to the Fressinet family of Limousin. He records Aynard de Fressinet, described as a knight, in documents relating to Vigeois Abbey in the first half of the 12th century. He subsequently records Aynard II and his brother Jossinellus and other members of the Fressinet family during the 12th and 13th centuries.

During the 13th century, the name Joussineau, derived from Jossinellus, began to replace Fressinet, and the family was for a period known as Joussineau-Fressinet.

By the early 14th century, Saint-Allais records Pierre de Joussineau as co-lord of Fressinet and lord of Tourdonnet. The name of the latter lordship subsequently became associated with the family surname.

The medieval references to the Fressinet family reported by earlier genealogists are distinct from the beginning of the continuous noble lineage accepted by modern nobiliary works, which dates from 1366.

=== Nobility and the Honours of the Court ===
The Joussineau de Tourdonnet family is classified among the French families of knightly extraction (noblesse d'extraction chevaleresque), with a continuous noble lineage dating from 1366. The family was maintained in its nobility in 1667 during the investigations into noble status carried out under Louis XIV.

The family's medieval origins and the knights of the Fressinet family recorded by earlier genealogists attest to the antiquity traditionally attributed to the lineage, although these earlier references are distinct from the continuous documented descent established from the 14th century.

The family was admitted on several occasions to the Honours of the Court during the 18th century. Louis-Joseph de Joussineau de Tourdonnet was presented at court in 1771.

The family was admitted to the Association d'entraide de la noblesse française (ANF) in 1988.

Members of the family use titles as Marquis and Counts, confirmed by Louis XIV in 1680. The Joussineau de Tourdonnet family was admitted to the honors of the court in 1771, 1773, 1779, 1786 and 1788.

=== Military, ecclesiastical and court service ===
Members of the family held military, ecclesiastical and court offices under the Ancien Régime.

Louis-Joseph de Joussineau de Tourdonnet distinguished himself at the Battle of Fontenoy in 1745 and was made a knight of the Order of Saint Louis. An écuyer cavalcadour (riding equerry), he was admitted to the Honours of the Court in 1771 and later became premier maître de la garde-robe to the Count of Artois, the future King Charles X.

Other members of the family served as officers in the royal army and royal guards and as members of the Order of Saint John of Jerusalem.

The family also included several clergymen. Boson de Joussineau was Abbot of Solignac Abbey in the 15th century, while other members held ecclesiastical benefices in Limousin.

=== Estates and lordships ===
The family's historic estates and lordships were principally located in Limousin. They included Tourdonnet and Fressinet at Saint-Priest-Ligoure, as well as Fayat and Château-Chervix.

Other estates and lordships held by branches of the family included Saint-Martin-Sepert, Saint-Vitte-sur-Briance, Peyrelevade and Les Oussines.

=== Modern period ===
A branch of the family settled in Sweden during the 20th century and is listed among Sweden's unintroduced nobility (Ointroducerad adel).

The Joussineau de Tourdonnet family remains extant.

== Notable members ==
- Boson de Joussineau (15th century), Abbot of Solignac.
- Pierre de Joussineau, lord of Tourdonnet, who supported the royal cause during the French Wars of Religion.
- Louis-Joseph de Joussineau de Tourdonnet (18th century), cavalry officer, knight of the Order of Saint Louis, riding equerry, admitted to the Honours of the Court in 1771, and premier maître de la garde-robe to the Count of Artois.
- Jean-Joseph de Joussineau de Tourdonnet, French army officer who attained the rank of Maréchal de camp and was sentenced to death by the Revolutionary Tribunal during the Reign of Terror in 1794.

== Coat of arms ==
The arms of the Joussineau de Tourdonnet family are:

Gules, a chief Or.

== See also ==
- French nobility
- Noblesse d'extraction
- Honours of the Court
- Limousin
