= Torstensson =

Torstensson is a surname. Notable people with the surname include:

- Anders Torstensson or Anders Torstenson, (1641–1686), Swedish statesman, member of the Privy Council, Governor-General of Estonia 1674–1681
- Åsa Torstensson (born 1958), Swedish politician and a member of the Centre Party
- Conny Torstensson (born 1949), former footballer from Sweden
- Count Lennart Torstensson or Lennart Torstenson, Count of Ortala, Baron of Virestad (1603–1651), Swedish Field Marshal & military engineer
- Klas Torstensson (born 1951), award-winning Swedish-Dutch composer
- Linnea Torstensson or Linnea Torstenson, (born 1983), Swedish handball player, played for the Sweden women's national handball team

== See also ==
- Thorsteinsson
- Thorsten
- Tore Svensson
- Torstenson War
