= Lilliestierna =

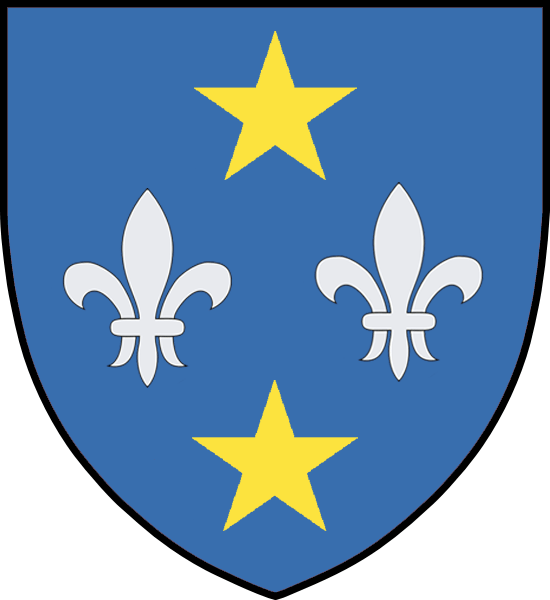

Lilliestierna is a Swedish noble family as well as the name of an earlier, extinct, noble family.

The first family descended from the Mayor of Stockholm, Bo Bjugg, whose son Jöns Bosson Bjugg was knighted in 1648 and awarded the name Lilliestierna. The family was introduced at the Swedish House of Nobility in 1649 under number 427 but ceased to exist with Jöns Bosson Bjugg himself.

The originator of the second family is Olof Persson (1600-1632) who was Senior Judge in Stockholm. The son of Olof Persson, the Secretary of the Government’s Chancery in Bremen and later the Secretary of the Royal Chancery in Stockholm, Andreas Bjugg (1631–1679), was knighted in September 1675 in Uppsala by Charles XI and awarded the name Lilliestierna. The family was introduced at The House of Nobility in 1678 under number 888.

Before the ennoblement Andreas Lilliestierna had accomplished several assignments for the Swedish Crown. He is particularly noted for serving as Secretary of Legation in Count Schlippenbach's unfortunate embassy to Poland in November 1660. The legation that sailed from Stockholm on the crown ship "Resande mannen" on 22 November 1660 only made it to Landsort south-east of Stockholm where it was caught by a storm and went under during the night between 22 and 23 November.

The family was promoted in 1778 to the reinstated second class at the House of Nobility, "Riddarklassen".

Andreas Lilliestierna married Catharina Beata Tönnek whose mother belonged to the Von Galen family. Their first son, Lieutenant-Colonel Carl Gustaf Lilliestierna was killed in the Battle of Düna on 9 July 1701. The second son, Henrik Gerhard Lilliestierna, was legal military counsel to Charles XII. Despite his position, Lilliestierna took part in combat and was captured by the Russian army after the Swedish defeat at Poltava in 1709 and died in a Russian military prison in Moscow on 7 December 1710. Before his imprisonment however, Lilliestierna had married Maria Elisabeth Günther with whom he got several children forming the line of the current living family.

Other noted members of the family are Carl Lilliestierna (1696 -1742), Hjalmar Rickard Lilliestierna (1861-1936) and Christina Lilliestierna (1923-2000).

The family first held the fideicommissum entailed estate of Edö near Askersund, which Captain Adolf Gerhard Lilliestierna traded in 1827 for the fideicommissum entailed estate of Stora Ek near Mariestad in Västra Götaland.
