= Ekeblad =

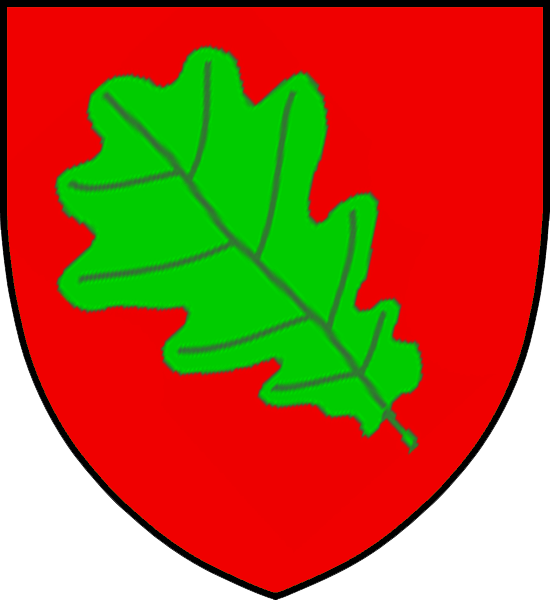
COA-family-sv-Ekeblad

Ekeblad is a surname for a noble family from Sweden. Notable people with the surname include:

- Eva Ekeblad (1724–1786), Swedish agronomist, scientist, salonist and noble
- Russ Ekeblad (1946–2018), American bridge player
