= Anckarsvärd =

Anckarsvärd is a surname. Notable people with the surname include:

- Ellen Anckarsvärd née Nyström (1833–1898), Swedish women's rights activist
- Michael Anckarsvärd (1742–1838), Swedish count, soldier, and politician
- Per Gustaf August Cossva Anckarsvärd (1865–1953), Swedish diplomat
