= Ekenberg =

Ekenberg or Eckenberg is a Swedish surname. Notable people with the surname include:

- Barbara Ekenberg (1717–1799), Swedish businesswomen
- Bengt Ekenberg (1912–1986), Swedish chess master
- Marcus Ekenberg (born 1980), Swedish footballer
- Roland Ekenberg (born 1957), Swedish Army major general
- Rozyna Małgorzata von Eckenberg (1625–1648), Polish court official
