= Palmstierna =

Palmstierna is a surname. Notable people with the surname include:

- Amanda Palmstierna (born 1977), Swedish politician
- Ebba Palmstierna (1877–1966), Swedish writer and suffragette
- Ellen Palmstierna (1869–1941), Swedish women's rights and peace activist
- Erik Palmstierna (1877–1959), Swedish politician and diplomat
- Jacob Palmstierna (1934–2013), Swedish banker
- Nils-Fredrik Palmstierna (1919–1990), Swedish Air Force officer
