= Barnekow =

- Municipality
- Location of Barnekow within Nordwestmecklenburg district
- Interactive map of Barnekow
- Location within Germany Location within Mecklenburg-Vorpommern
- Coordinates: 53°52′N 11°22′E
- Country: Germany
- State: Mecklenburg-Vorpommern
- District: Nordwestmecklenburg
- Municipal assoc.: Dorf Mecklenburg-Bad Kleinen
- Subdivisions: 4

Government
  - Mayor: Birgit Heine

Area
  - Total: 15.59 km^{2} (6.02 sq mi)
- Elevation: 39 m (128 ft)

Population (2025-12-31)
  - Total: 551
  - Density: 35.3/km^{2} (91.5/sq mi)
- Time zone: UTC+01:00 (CET)
  - Summer (DST): UTC+02:00 (CEST)
- Postal codes: 23968
- Dialling codes: 03841
- Vehicle registration: NWM
- Website: www.amt-dorf-mecklenburg.de

Barnekow is a municipality in the Nordwestmecklenburg district, in Mecklenburg-Vorpommern, Germany.
