= Hagelstam =

Hagelstam is a surname. Notable people with the surname include:

- Anna Hagelstam (1883–1946), Finnish singer and songwriter
- Sandra Hagelstam (born 1987), Swedish-speaking Finnish blogger, influencer, fashion designer, and entrepreneur
- Stella Hagelstam (born 1984), Finnish dressage rider
