= Alströmer =

Alströmer is a Swedish surname. Notable people with the surname include:

- Clas Alströmer (1736–1794), Swedish naturalist
- Jonas Alströmer (1685–1761), Swedish pioneer of agriculture and industry
- Jonas Alströmer (1877–1955), Swedish diplomat
- Margareta Alströmer (1763–1816), Swedish painter and concert singer
