= Hegardt =

Hegardt is the surname of a Swedish noble family.

The Grant of Arms has been kept in the Swedish House of Nobility (Riddarhuset in Swedish) since 1967.

== See also ==
- List of Swedish noble families
