= Nyberg =

Nyberg may refer to:

- Nyberg (surname), including a list of people with the name
- Nyberg Automobile, a defunct auto manufacturer in Indiana, U.S.
- 15492 Nyberg, an asteroid
