= Lagerbielke =

Lagerbielke is a surname. Notable people with the surname include:

- Axel Lagerbielke (1702–1782), Swedish naval officer
- Gustaf Lagerbjelke (1817–1895), Swedish politician
- Gustaf Lagerbielke (footballer) (born 2000), Swedish footballer
- Lucie Lagerbielke (1865–1931), Swedish artist and writer
