= Celsing =

Celsing is a surname. Notable people with the surname include:

- Elsa Celsing (1880–1974), Swedish artist also known as Elsa Backlund-Celsing
- Lars von Celsing (1916–2009), Swedish diplomat
- Peter Celsing (1920–1974), Swedish modernist architect
