= Rosenfelt =

Rosenfelt is a surname. Notable people with the surname include:

- David Rosenfelt, American author
- Frank Rosenfelt (1921–2007), American media executive
- Karen Rosenfelt, American media proprietor, film and television producer
- Phil Rosenfelt, American lawyer and civil servant
