= Boltenstern =

Boltenstern is a Germanic surname that may refer to:

- Gustaf Adolf Boltenstern (1861–1935), Swedish officer and horse rider
- Gustaf Adolf Boltenstern Jr. (1904–1995), Swedish officer and horse rider
- Walter von Boltenstern (1889–1952), Wehrmacht General during World War II
