= Grönberg =

Grönberg is a Swedish surname. Notable people with the surname include:

- Martin Grönberg (born 1994), Swedish ice hockey player
- Mathias Grönberg (born 1970), Swedish golfer
- Raimo Grönberg (born 1953), Finnish actor
