= Nordenfalk =

Nordenfalk is Swedish surname. Notable people with the surname include:

- Johan Nordenfalk (1796–1846), Swedish politician and Prime Minister for Justice
- Carl Nordenfalk (1907–1992), Swedish art historian
