= Af Klintberg =

Af Klintberg is a Swedish surname of a noble family from Scania. Notable people with the surname include:

- Bengt af Klintberg (born 1938), Swedish ethnologist, folklorist, and artist
- Gunnar af Klintberg (1902–1983), Swedish Army officer
- Olle af Klintberg, Swedish folk musician
