= Heidenstam =

Heidenstam or von Heidenstam is a surname. Notable people with the surname include:

- Gustaf von Heidenstam (1822–1887), Swedish engineer
- Verner von Heidenstam (1859–1940), Swedish poet and novelist
- Hugo von Heidenstam (1884–1966), Swedish diplomat and engineer
- Oscar Heidenstam (1911–1991), Cyprus-born British bodybuilder
