= Von Otter =

von Otter is a Swedish noble family. People with that name include:

- Anne Sofie von Otter (born 1955), Swedish opera singer
- Birgitta von Otter (born 1939), Swedish writer and journalist
- Fredrik von Otter (1833–1910), Swedish naval officer and prime minister
- Göran von Otter (1907–1988), Swedish diplomat
