= Af Jochnick =

Af Jochnick is a Swedish surname. Notable people with the surname include:

- Jonas af Jochnick (1937–2019), Swedish businessman
- Kerstin af Jochnick (born 1958), Swedish banker
- Robert af Jochnick (born 1940), Swedish businessman, brother of Jonas
