= Gyllenborg =

Gyllenborg is a surname. Notable people with the surname include:

- Carl Gyllenborg (1679–1746), Swedish statesman and author
- Fredrik Gyllenborg (1767–1829), Swedish Prime Minister
- Gustaf Fredrik Gyllenborg (1731–1808), Swedish writer
- John Michael Gyllenborg (born 2002), American football player
- Gyllenborg is also a primary school in Tromsø, Norway.
