= Ranck =

Ranck is a surname. Notable people with the surname include:

- James B. Ranck Jr. (born 1930), American physiologist
- Sven Ranck (1616–1684), Swedish statesman
- Werner Ranck (1904–1989), German general and convicted war criminal

== See also ==
- Thomas Ranck Round Barn
