= Stiernstedt =

Stiernstedt is a surname. Notable people with the surname include:

- Hedda Stiernstedt, Swedish actress
- Marika Stiernstedt, Swedish writer
