= Schmiterlöw =

Schmiterlöw is a surname. Notable people with the surname include:

- Bertram Schmiterlöw (1920–2002), Swedish painter, printmaker, draughtsman, and sculptor
- Vera Schmiterlöw (1904–1987), Swedish actress
