= Strijk =

Strijk is a surname. Notable people with the surname include:

- Andrew Strijk (born 1987), Australian footballer
- Marjon Strijk, Dutch classical soprano
