= Manderström =

Manderström is a Swedish surname. Notable people with the surname include:

- Charlotte Manderström (1748–1816), Swedish lady in waiting and noble
- Ludvig Manderström (1806–1873), Swedish diplomat
