= Palmstruch =

Palmstruch is a surname. Notable people with the surname include:

- Johan Palmstruch (1611–1671), entrepreneur, financier and financial innovator
- Johan Wilhelm Palmstruch (1770–1811), Swedish botanist

== See also ==
- Palmstruch Bank or the Bank of Palmstruch, alternate names for Stockholms Banco, the first European bank to issue printed banknotes
