= Von Plomgren =

Von Plomgren is a surname. Notable people with the surname include:

- Ida von Plomgren (1870–1960), Swedish fencer
- Lotten von Plomgren
