= Cederqvist =

Cederqvist is a Swedish surname. Notable people with the surname include:

- Jane Cederqvist (1945–2023), Swedish swimmer
- Pär Cederqvist (born 1980), Swedish footballer

== See also ==
- Cederquist
