= List of Finnish noble families =

The following is the list of Finnish noble families, that have been introduced to the Finnish House of Nobility. There are 357 such families, of which 148 still are alive. Still existing families include four with title of count and 25 with title of baron. The remaining 119 families belong to untitled nobility.

== Families ==
(A) untitled nobility, (F) Vapaaherra/Friherre (baron), (G) Kreivi/Greve (count), (R) Ruhtinas/Furste (prince)

- (A) Adlercreutz
- (A) Adlerstjerna
- (A) Agricola
- (A) von Alfthan
- (F) von Alfthan
- (A) Aminoff
- (F) Aminoff
- (G) Aminoff
- (A) von Ammondt
- (A) Antell
- (A) Armfelt
- (F) Armfelt
- (G) Armfelt
- (A) Arppe
- (A) von Baumgarten
- (A) von Becker
- (A) Benzelstjerna
- (A) Bergenheim
- (F) Bergenheim
- (A) Bergenstråle
- (G) Berg
- (A) Biron
- (A) Björkenheim
- (A) af Björkesten
- (A) af Björksten
- (A) von Blom
- (A) Blåfield
- (A) von Boehm
- (A) Boije af Gennäs
- (F) Boije af Gennäs
- (A) von Boisman
- (A) von Bonsdorff
- (F) von Bonsdorff
- (A) von Born
- (F) von Born
- (A) Bosin
- (A) Brakel
- (A) Brand
- (A) von Briskorn
- (A) Brummer
- (A) Brummer
- (A) Bruncrona
- (A) af Brunér
- (A) Brunow
- (A) Bruun
- (F) Bruun
- (A) von Burghausen
- (A) Bäck i Finland
- (A) von Böningh
- (F) Carpelan
- (F) Cedercreutz
- (A) Cederholm
- (F) Cederström
- (A) von Cederwald
- (A) Charpentier
- (A) von Christierson
- (A) Clementeoff
- (A) von Collan
- (A) Conradi
- (G) Creutz
- (G) Cronhjelm af Hakunge
- (A) Cronstedt
- (F) Cronstedt
- (A) von Daehn
- (A) de Besche
- (A) de Carnall
- (A) de Carnall
- (A) De Geer
- (G) de Geer Till Tervik
- (A) de la Chapelle
- (F) de la Chapelle
- (A) de la Motte
- (A) Edelfelt
- (A) Edelheim
- (A) Edelsköld
- (A) Ehrenmalm
- (A) Ehrenstolpe
- (A) Ehrenström
- (A) Ehrnrooth
- (A) Ehrnrooth
- (A) Ekbom
- (A) Ekestubbe
- (A) Eneberg
- (A) af Enehjelm
- (A) Eneskjöld
- (A) von Essen
- (A) Estlander
- (A) Estlander
- (A) Etholén
- (A) Etholén
- (A) von Etter
- (A) Falckenheim
- (A) Falck
- (A) Fellman
- (A) Fellman
- (A) Feuerstern
- (A) von Fieandt
- (A) Finckenberg
- (A) Fischer
- (F) Fleming af Lieblitz
- (A) Fock
- (A) Forbes
- (A) af Forselles
- (F) af Forselles
- (A) Forsman
- (A) Fraser
- (A) Fredensköld
- (F) Freedricksz
- (A) Freidenfelt
- (A) von Frenckell
- (F) von Friesendorff
- (A) af Frosterus
- (A) Furuhjelm
- (A) Furumarck
- (A) Gadolin
- (A) af Gadolin
- (A) von Gertten
- (A) Glansentjerna
- (A) Godenhjelm
- (A) Granfelt
- (A) Gripenberg
- (F) Gripenberg
- (A) Gripenwaldt
- (A) Grotenfelt
- (A) Grönhagen
- (A) von Guvenius
- (A) Gyldenstolpe
- (F) Gyldenstolpe
- (A) Gyllenbögel
- (A) Gyllenhök
- (A) von Haartman
- (F) von Haartman
- (A) Hackman
- (A) von Hartmansdorff
- (F) von Hauff
- (A) von Hauswolff
- (A) Hedenberg
- (A) von Heideman
- (A) von Hellens
- (F) von Hellens
- (A) af Hellen
- (A) af Heurlin
- (A) Hisinger
- (F) Hisinger-Jägerskiöld
- (F) Hjerta
- (A) Hjulhammar
- (A) Hjärne
- (F) Hjärne
- (A) af Hällström
- (A) Hästesko af Målagård
- (A) Idestam
- (A) Indrenius
- (F) Indrenius-Zalewski
- (A) Jerlström
- (A) Jordan
- (A) von Julin
- (A) Jägerhorn af Spurila
- (A) Jägerhorn af Storby
- (A) Jägerskiöld
- (A) Järnefelt
- (A) af Klercker
- (F) af Klercker
- (A) Klick
- (F) Klinckowström
- (A) Klingstedt
- (A) Knorring
- (F) von Knorring
- (A) von Knorring
- (A) von Konow
- (A) von Kothen
- (F) von Kothen
- (A) Krabbe
- (A) von Kræmer
- (A) Kuhlefelt
- (A) Kuhlman
- (G) Kuscheleff-Besborodko
- (A) Ladau
- (A) Lagerborg
- (A) Lagermarck
- (A) Lagus
- (F) Langenskiöld
- (A) Langenskjöld
- (F) Langhoff
- (A) Lavonius
- (A) Lillienberg
- (A) Lilljebrunn
- (A) Lindcrantz
- (A) Lindelöf
- (A) Linder
- (F) Linder af Svartå
- (A) af Lindfors
- (A) Lindtman
- (A) Lode
- (F) Lybecker
- (F) Mannerheim
- (G) Mannerheim
- (A) Mannerstråle
- (A) von Marquard
- (A) Martinau
- (A) Mechelin
- (A) Mechelin
- (A) af Meinander
- (F) Mellin
- (R) Menschikoff
- (A) von Minckwitz
- (A) Molander
- (F) Molander
- (A) Montgomerie
- (A) Morian
- (A) Munck af Fulkila
- (F) Munck
- (A) Munsterhjelm
- (A) von Müller
- (A) Möllersvärd
- (A) von Nandelstadh
- (A) Nassokin
- (F) Nicolaij
- (F) von Nolcken
- (A) Nordenheim
- (A) Nordenskjöld
- (A) Nordenstam
- (A) Nordenswan
- (A) Nordmann
- (A) Norrmén
- (A) von Nottbeck
- (A) von Numers
- (A) Nybom
- (A) Nyborg
- (A) Oker-Blom
- (A) Olivecreutz
- (A) Ollongren
- (A) Palmén
- (F) Palmén
- (A) Palmfelt
- (A) af Petersen
- (A) Pinello
- (A) Pippingsköld
- (A) Pipping
- (A) Pistolekors
- (A) von Platen
- (A) Pomell
- (A) von Post
- (A) Procopé
- (A) Prytz
- (A) von Qvanten
- (F) Rask
- (F) Ramsay
- (A) Ramsay
- (A) von Rancken
- (A) von Rehausen
- (F) Rehbinder
- (A) Reiher
- (A) Rein
- (A) Rennerfelt
- (A) von Rettig
- (A) Reuterskjöld
- (A) Ridderborg
- (A) Ridderstad
- (A) Ridderstorm
- (A) Riddersvärd
- (A) Roediger
- (A) von Rohr
- (F) Rokassowskij
- (A) Roos af Hjelmsäter
- (A) Rosenbröijer
- (F) Rosenkampff
- (A) Rosenlew
- (A) Rotkirch
- (F) Rotkirch
- (A) Sackleen
- (F) Sackleen
- (G) Sanmark
- (A) Sass
- (A) von Schantz
- (A) Schatelowitz
- (A) Schauman
- (A) Schildt
- (A) von Schrowe
- (A) Schulman
- (F) af Schultén
- (A) af Schultén
- (A) Schützercrantz
- (A) von Schoultz
- (A) Segercrantz
- (A) Segerstråle
- (F) Silfverhjelm
- (A) Silfverswan
- (A) Snellman
- (A) Soisalon-Soininen
- (A) Spåre
- (F) Stackelberg
- (A) Standertskjöld
- (F) Standertskjöld
- (F) Standertskjöld-Nordenstam
- (A) Starck
- (A) af Stenhof
- (A) Steven
- (G) Stewen-Steinheil
- (A) von Sticht
- (A) Stierncreutz
- (F) Stjerncrantz
- (A) Stjernschantz
- (A) Stjernvall
- (A) Ståhlhane
- (A) Stålarm Tavast
- (A) Stålhammar
- (F) van Suchtelen
- (G) von Suchtelen
- (A) Svinhufvud af Qvalstad
- (A) Sölfverarm
- (A) Tandefelt
- (F) Tandefelt
- (A) Taube
- (A) Tawaststjerna
- (A) Tawast
- (A) Teetgren
- (A) af Tengström
- (A) von Tesche
- (A) Thesleff
- (A) von Thomsen
- (A) Tigerstedt
- (A) Toll
- (A) Toll
- (A) Torwigge
- (A) von Trapp
- (A) Tudeer
- (F) von Troil
- (A) von Törne
- (A) Törngren
- (A) Törnqvist
- (A) Uggla
- (A) af Ursin
- (F) Walleen
- (A) von Weissenberg
- (A) von Wendt
- (A) von Willebrand
- (F) von Willebrand
- (F) von Willebrand
- (F) von Willbrand
- (A) von Winther
- (A) von Wright
- (A) von Wulffert
- (A) Wadenstierna
- (A) Wahlberg
- (A) Wahren
- (A) Walleen
- (A) Wallensköld
- (A) Wallenstjerna
- (A) Wallenstråle
- (A) Wasastjerna
- (F) Wrede af Elimä
- (A) von Wright
- (A) von Wulffert
- (A) Wuorenheimo
- (A) Wärnhjelm
- (A) Yrjö-Koskinen
- (F) Yrjö-Koskinen
- (A) Zansen
- (G) Zakrewsky
- (A) Örnhjelm
- (A) Örn
