= Moland =

Moland may refer to:

== People ==
- Arnfinn Moland (born 1951), Norwegian historian
- Hans Petter Moland (born 1955), Norwegian film director
- John Moland (c. 1700–1760), American lawyer
- Liv Marit Moland (1948–2008), Norwegian trade unionist and politician
- Tjostolv Moland (1981–2013), Norwegian army officer and security contractor
- Torstein Moland (born 1945), Norwegian economist

== Places ==
- Moland Municipality, a former municipality in the old Aust-Agder county, Norway
- Moland, Telemark, a village in Fyresdal Municipality in Telemark county, Norway
- Moland Church (disambiguation), a list of churches with the name Moland
- Moland House, an old stone farmhouse in Bucks County, Pennsylvania, US
- Moland, Minnesota, an unincorporated community
- Moland Township, Clay County, Minnesota
- Móland, a small farm area in Akureyri, Iceland

== See also ==
- Austre Moland Municipality, a former municipality in the old Aust-Agder county, Norway
- Vestre Moland Municipality, a former municipality in the old Aust-Agder county, Norway
- Molander (disambiguation)
