= Bergenheim =

Bergenheim is a surname. Notable people with the name include:

- Edvard Bergenheim (1798–1884), Finnish Archbishop of Turku
- Richard Bergenheim (1948–2008), American editor of the Christian Science Monitor
- Robert C. Bergenheim (1924–2010), American journalist and editor
- Sean Bergenheim (born 1984), Finnish ice hockey winger
