= Wilhelm von Carpelan =

Wilhelm von Carpelan may refer to:

- Wilhelm Carpelan (1778-1829), Swedish government official for postal service
- Wilhelm Maximilian Carpelan (1787-1830), Finnish-Swedish military officer, draftsman, surveyor and cartographer

== See also ==
- Finnish transport vessel Wilhelm Carpelan Finnish transport vessel
