= Von Hauff =

von Hauff is a German noble family from Swabia, which belongs also to the Finnish nobility. The family is known since the mid-16th century. It was granted a Hessian baronial title 8 November 1853. The wholesale merchant, consul of Saxony in St Petersburg, baron Ludwig von Hauff, was naturalized as a nobleman 9 February 1859 and introduced into among barons in the Finnish House of Nobility 22 September of the same year under no. 42. No member of the family has resided in Finland.
