= Gunnar Nirstedt =

Swedish editor and publisher (born 1965)

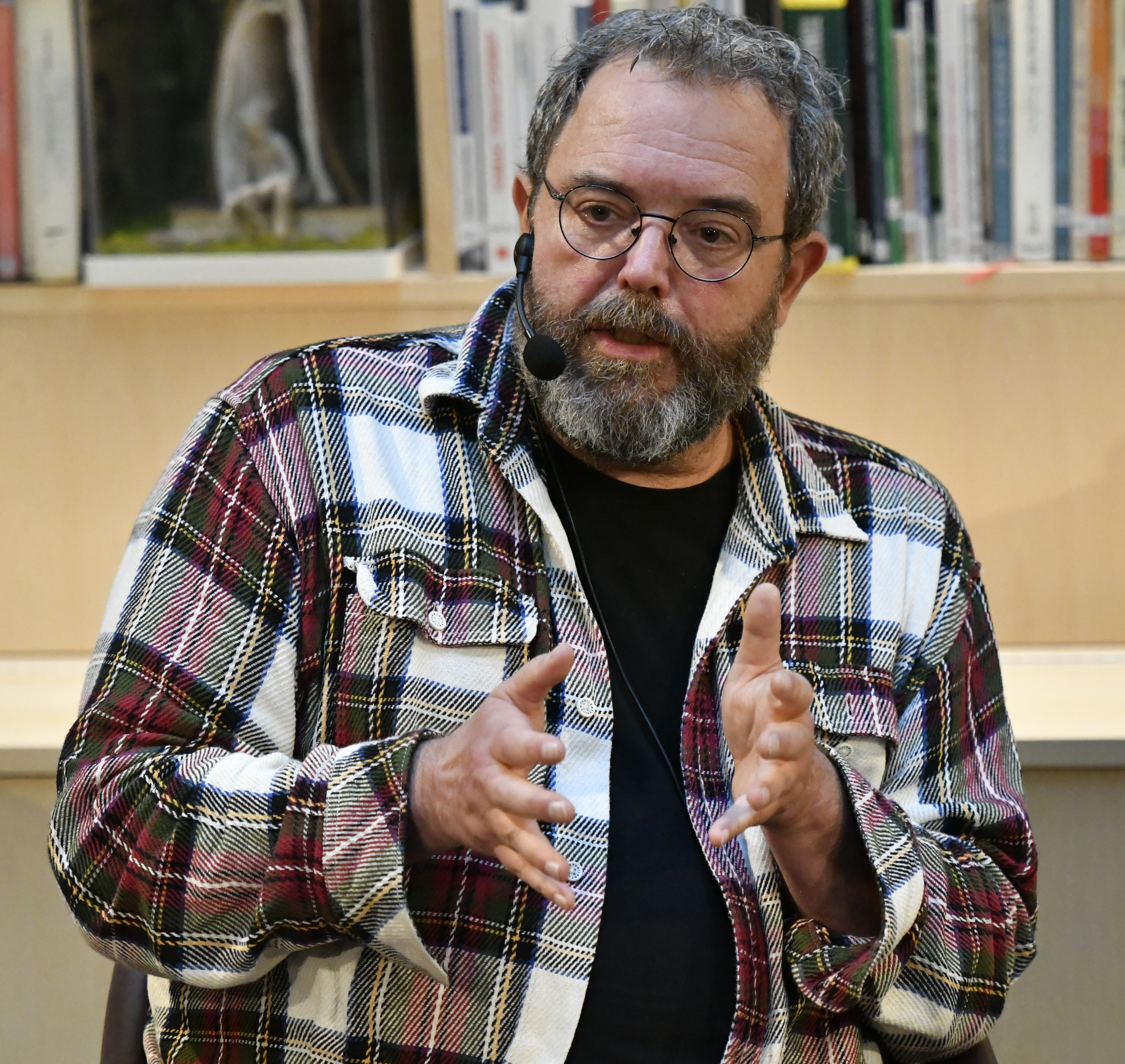
Gunnar Nirstedt, 2024.

Gunnar Nirstedt (born 1965) is a Swedish editor and publisher. After a string of jobs in the book business – doing freelance work for the publisher Gedins förlag, literature critic at Östgöta Correspondenten and working at Akademibokhandeln – he came to Albert Bonniers förlag in 1994. He left Bonniers in 2018, arguing that the publisher had abandoned quality literature to focus on more easily marketable books suitable for audiobook consumers. Together with the Modernista Publishing Group he started the publishing house Nirstedt/litteratur, with a focus on fiction and poetry.

He wrote the children's book Platon Persson och blomman i mörkret, published by Modernista in 2006, and has translated children's literature from English to Swedish.
