= House of Knights =

House of Knights can refer to the following historical Nordic noble estate's assemblies:

- Swedish House of Nobility
- Finnish House of Nobility
