= C. A. J. Gadolin =

Finnish writer

Carl Axel Johan Gadolin (14 November 1898 – 21 October 1972) was a Finnish doctor of philosophy and a writer in Swedish. He also used the pseudonyms Alexander Gaditz and Kristian Ulfsby.

Gadolin was born in Espoo to professor Alexander Gadolin and Signe Adéle von Alfthan. He graduated in 1916 with a master's degree in philosophy in 1920 and a licentiate and doctorate in 1937. He married Ingrid Mary Anita Stackelberg on 30 July 1924, with whom he had three children: Bo Wolter Alexander, Ingegerd Rubia Anitra, and Innet Iza Helena.

Gadolin was the secretary of the Turku Chamber of Commerce from 1924 to 1940, the director of the Turku Stock Exchange from 1924 to 1940, an associate professor at Åbo Akademi University from 1938 and the General Counsel of the Central Chamber of Commerce in 1940 and 1941. Gadolin was a member of the trade delegation in Germany and England in 1929, in Russia in 1934 and in Latvia in 1938. He was head of the German delegation to the Central Chamber of Commerce in 1940.

Gadolin wrote numerous antisemitic writings and denied the Holocaust in his writings.

== Works ==
- Strövtåg genom det nationella Tyskland hösten 1913 : från möjligheternas land; C. A. J. Gadolin and Eric v. Born. Söderströms, Helsinki 1913
- Politiska besök hos ryska monarkister; C. A. J. Gadolin and Eric v. Born. C. W. K. Gleerup, Lund 1922
- Omin siivin: omien päälentolinjojen merkitys: Ratkaisu riippuu kulkulaitosministeriöstä. Turku 1924 (special edition Uusi Aura)
- Rautatiehallitus ja yöjunayhteydet Turusta pohjoiseen: eräs epämiellyttävä sakkiveto tarkoituksella rikkoa yhtenäinen mielipide asiassa. Turku 1924 (special edition Uusi Aura)
- Synpunkter på vårt tariffproblem med särskild hänsyn till godstrafiken. Publications of the Turku Chamber of Commerce 16. Turku Chamber of Commerce, Turku 1924 (Finnish: Tavaratariffiemme uudistaminen. Turun kauppakamarin julkaisemia kirjasia no. 16. Turun kauppakamari, Turku 1924)
- Veronmaksajayhdistys Turkuun: Suomen veronmaksajayhdistyksen paikallisosasto. Suomen veronmaksajayhdistyksen paikallisosasto, Turku 1924
- Fraktutjämningen för vinterhamnarna: ett led i en målmedveten ekonomisk politik. Turku 1925
- Pakollinen tavaran alkuperämerkintä ja eri maiden suhtautuminen siihen. Helsinki 1931 (special edition Kauppalehti)
- En bilsommar i Ostalperna. Söderströms, Helsinki 1932
- Åbo handlande borgerskap: en historisk återblick med anledning av Handelsföreningens i Åbo sextioårsjubileum. Åbo 1934 (Finnish: Turun kauppaa harjoittava porvaristo: historiallinen katsaus Turun kauppayhdistyksen kuusikymmenvuotisjuhlan johdosta. Turku 1934)
- Sparande och depression. Ekonomiska samfundet, Helsinki 1935
- Produktionsomvägsbegreppet i kapitalanalysen: bidrag till diskussionen om den s.k. temporala kapitalteorien, doctoral thesis. Publications of the Ekonomiska samfundet i Finland 2. Schildts, Helsinki 1936
- Varsinais-Suomi matkailumaana: esitelmä Turun liikemiesyhdistyksessä 28. 10-36. Turku 1936
- Handelsförbindelserna mellan Åbo och England: Carl Axel Johan Gadolin föredrag vid Åbo handelskammares och Finsk-engelska handelsföreningens gemensamma möte den 5 november 1937. Turku 1937
- Nordiskt samgående: Part 1 includes articles by Herman Gummerus and Carl Axel Johan Gadolin. Nya Dagligt Allehandas författartävling 1. Wahlström & Widstrand, Stockholm 1937
- Finland av i går och i dag: en politisk-ekonomisk översikt. Kooperativa förbundets bokförlag, Stockholm 1938, 2nd revised edition 1940
- Rahanarvon muutokset Suomessa. Helsinki 1939 (special edition Kauppalehti no. 59, 11 March 1939)
- Die Volkswirtschaft Finnlands und ihre weltwirtschaftlichen Verflechtungen in der Nachkriegszeit. Kieler Vorträge 60. Gustav Fischer, Jena 1939
- Tyskland och vi. Nya Argus 1/1939
- Synpunkter på skadeersättningsproblemet. Författaren, Helsinki 1940 (Finnish: Näkökohtia vahingonkorvauskysymyksestä. Akateeminen kirjakauppa, Helsinki 1940)
- Ostkarelen - det finska gränslandet. Vår nya värld 11. Dagens böcker, Malmö 1941
- Moderna strömmingar inom ekonomisk teori. Helsinki 1942
- Nyordning i öster. Det nya Europa 1. Dagens böcker, Malmö 1942
- Der Norden, der Ostraum und das neue Europa. Carl Röhrig, Munich 1943
- Produktionspolitisk framtidsmusik. Författaren, Turku 1943
- Kapital och ränta. Penningvärdets förlag, Kalmar 1948
- Synpunkterna på räntabilitetsschemat och räntans konstnadsandel. Penningvärdets skriftserie 1. Penningvärdets förlag, Kalmar 1948
- Den gyllene synderskan: en roman från det joniska upprorets dagar. Akademiska bokhandeln, Helsinki 1950
- Das Flüchtlingsproblem in Finnland. Mitteilungen aus dem Institut für Raumforschung Bonn 15. Institut für Raumforschung, Bad Godesberg 1952
- The solution of the Karelian refugee problem in Finland; with a preface by G. H. L. Zeegers. Publications of the Research Group for European Migration Problems 5. Martinus Nijhoff, The Hague 1952
- Näkökohtia vakauttamisesta: erehdyksiä, jotka olisi korjattava ja joita ei pitäisi toistaa. Helsinki 1957
- Strövtåg kring Medelhavet; foto Harriet Percy. Saxon & Lindström, Stockholm 1967

As Alexander Gaditz:

- Samhället i krigets trollkrets. Carlos, Åbo - Fahlcrantz & Gumaelius, Stockholm 1946

As Kristian Ulfsby :

- Rosor vid vägen: åtta berättelser om kvinnor: en nordisk Casanova berättar. H. Åbergs bokförlag i distribution, Stockholm 1946
