= Gadolin =

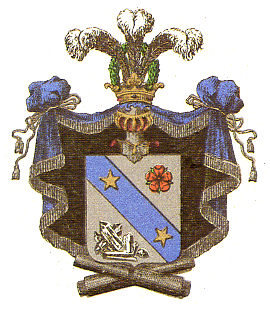

The Gadolin family is a Finnish noble family, whose members held significant positions in the history of Finland.

== Notable members ==
- Jakob Gadolin (1719-1802), Finnish Lutheran Bishop and Johan Gadolin's father
- Johan Gadolin (1760-1852), Finnish chemist
- Axel Gadolin (1828-1892), Finnish/Russian crystallographer and lieutenant general
- Alexander Gadolin (1868-1939), Finnish jurist

== See also ==
- 2638 Gadolin, asteroid
- Gadolinite, silicate mineral
- Gadolinium, chemical element
