= Gyldenstolpe =

- Swedish noble family
- Country: Sweden
- Origin: Ångermanland
- Founded: 1650s
- Titles: List: Baron Gyldenstolpe (1687); Count Gyldenstolpe (1690)

The Gyldenstolpe family is a Swedish noble family. The last male member of the family died in 1961 and the last female member in 2017.

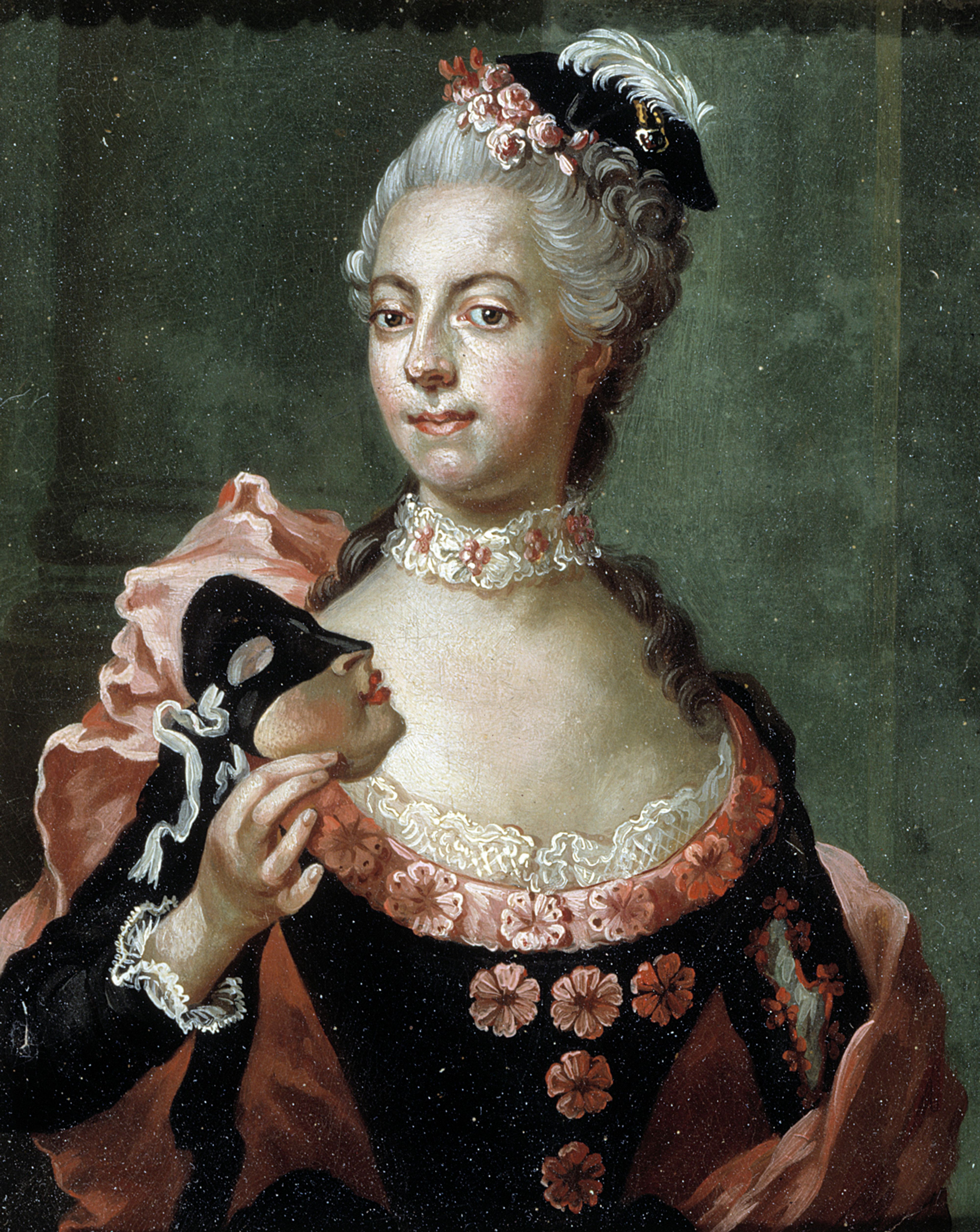
Countess Jacqueline Elisabet Gyldenstolpe

== List of people ==
- Charlotte Stierneld (née Gyldenstolpe, 1766-1825), Swedish courtier
- Nils Gyldenstolpe (disambiguation), several people

== See also ==
- Gyldenstolpe's worm skink
