= De la Motte =

French and Swedish noble families

de la Motte
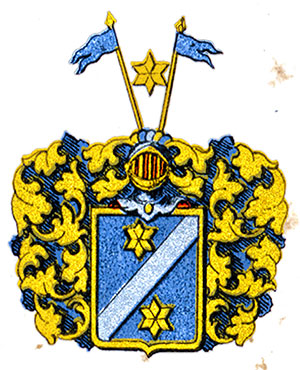
- Country: France, Sweden, Finland
- Origin: France
- Founded: Before 14th century (various branches)
- Founder: Multiple
- Titles: Baron, Viscount, Count, Marquis, Duke (varies by branch)
- Connected families: de la Mothe-Houdancourt, le Clerc de la Motte, de la Motte-Fouqué
- Website: Swedish House of Nobility

de la Motte refers to several noble families of French origin, some of which held high-ranking titles and offices in the French military, church, and royal court from the Middle Ages through the Ancien Régime. Several of these families are still extant and represented in the French Association d’entraide de la Noblesse Française (ANF). The name is also associated with a Swedish noble family descended from a French officer who settled in Finland in the early 17th century.

== de la Motte in France ==
Multiple noble families in France bore the name de la Motte, several with documented high aristocratic status (*noblesse ancienne*). They were especially prominent in Normandy, Brittany, Picardy, Île-de-France, and Nivernais, and were active from the 14th century onward in military, ecclesiastical, and court service. Families included the branches de la Mothe-Houdancourt, de la Motte-Guistel, de la Motte-Fouqué, and le Clerc de la Motte.

=== Military and noble officeholders ===
- Philippe de la Mothe-Houdancourt (1605–1657), Duke of Cardona, Marshal of France, Viceroy of Catalonia, and general in the Spanish campaigns.
- Charles de la Mothe-Houdancourt (1643–1728), Marquis, lieutenant general, governor, and Grandee of Spain, son of Philippe.
- Henri-Charles de la Motte, colonel of the Royal Corps of Artillery and Engineers (1755), knight of the Order of Saint Louis, lord of La Motte (branch: de la Motte-Guistel).
- Charles de la Motte-Guistel, knight, lord of Ville, Villers-la-Fosse, and Cuissy, aide-de-camp in the royal armies (1644), and cavalry captain (1652). Married Madeleine de Crécy; their son died in battle near Maastricht in 1673.
- Hector de la Motte, officer in the King’s household guard, titled *maréchal des logis général* for Île-de-France.
- Toussaint-Guillaume Picquet de la Motte (1720–1791), Count and admiral in the French Navy, highly distinguished during the reigns of Louis XV and Louis XVI.

=== Clergy and royal service ===
- Daniel de la Mothe, abbot, Bishop of Mende, royal preacher and adviser to Queen Henrietta Maria of France.
- Henri de la Mothe, Archbishop of Auch, Bishop of Rennes, court preacher to Queen Anne of Austria, and knight of the Order of the Holy Spirit.
- François-Auguste le Clerc de la Motte, captain and knight of the Order of Saint Louis, of the branch from Nivernais.

=== Early medieval mentions ===
Noblemen named de la Motte are documented as early as the 14th century:

- Thibaut de la Motte, knight listed in a 1383 muster in Orléans.
- Jean de la Motte, recorded in a 1421 muster for the Count of Aumale.
- Nicolas de la Motte, in military rolls from 1420.
- C. & T. de la Motte, noble defenders of Mont-Saint-Michel against English forces in 1423 during the Hundred Years’ War.

=== Other titled nobles ===
- Roger de la Motte, Viscount of Neufchâtel, mentioned in 15th-century legal records from the Échiquier de Normandie as *Seigneur de Sainte-Geneviève*.
- René de la Motte, Baron of Saint-Séverin and lord of la Motte-Fouqué, active in Normandy and Brittany.
- Claude de la Motte († 1595), courtier in service of Queen Catherine de' Medici, captain and governor of Monceaux Castle in Brie.

== de la Motte in Sweden and Finland ==
A separate family line of French origin was introduced into the Swedish nobility in 1642. The family descends from Samson de la Motte, a French officer who served Sweden during the siege of Wollmar Castle in 1601. In recognition of his service, he was granted the estate of Lahis in Sääksmäki Parish (in present-day Finland), and promoted to major general.

His son, Carl de la Motte, was naturalized as a Swedish nobleman and introduced at the House of Nobility (Sweden) under number 280. Most descendants resided in Finland and pursued military careers. When Finland was ceded to Russia in 1809, the family was matriculated into the House of Nobility (Finland) in 1818 under number 23. The Finnish line became extinct in the male line in 1886 and on the female line sometime after 1936.

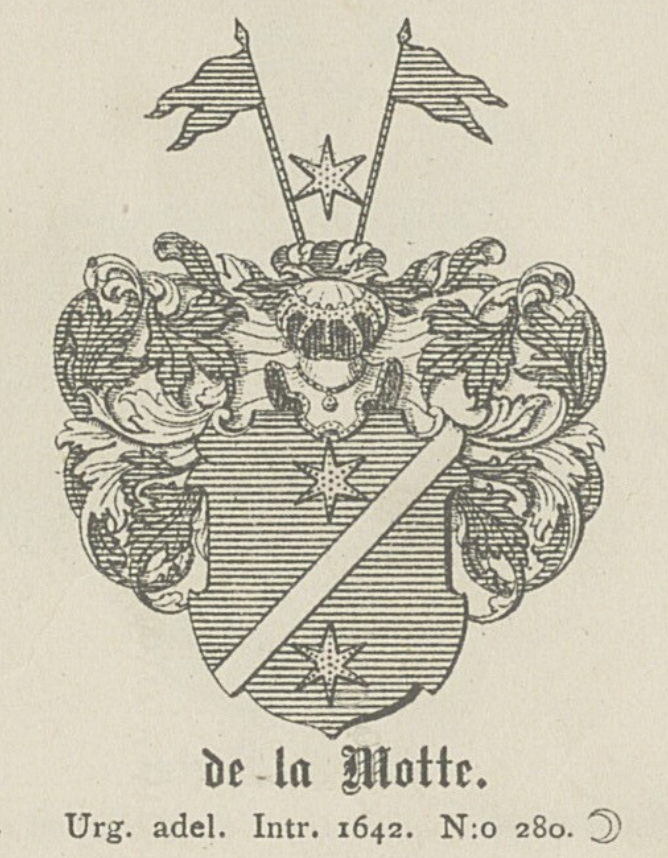
Coat of arms of the Swedish de la Motte family, from Klingspor's Sveriges ridderskaps och adels vapenbok (1890)

== Etymology ==
The name motte comes from Old French, meaning “mound” or “clod of earth,” and refers to motte-and-bailey castles—medieval fortifications built on artificial hills.

== See also ==
- French nobility
- Swedish nobility
- House of Nobility (Sweden)
- House of Nobility (Finland)
