= Hausswolff =

Hausswolff, von Hausswolff, Hausswolf, von Hausswolf, Hauswolff, von Hauswolff, Hauswolf, von Hauswolf, Haußwolff, von Haußwolff, Haußwolf, von Haußwolf, is a surname.

== Persons ==
People with this surname include:

- Anna von Hausswolff (born 1986, as Anna Michaela Ebba Electra von Hausswolff), Swedish musician, daughter of Carl Michael
- Annika von Hausswolff (born 1967), Swedish artist
- Bernhard Reinhold von Hauswolff (1700–1776), an 18th-century governor of Dalarna County, Sweden
- Carl Michael von Hausswolff (born 1956), Swedish musician and artist, father of Anna
- Leonard von Hauswolff (1746–1826), a 19th century Master of Ceremonies (Sweden)
- Maria von Hausswolff (born 1985), Swedish cinematographer, winner of multiple Bodil Award for Best Cinematographer
- Marietta von Hausswolff von Baumgarten, Swedish screenwriter, wife of Carl Michael, stepmother of Anna

== Fictional characters ==
- Chris von Hausswolf, a fictional character from the 2019 film Intrigo: Samaria

== Families ==
- von Hauswolff, a Finnish noble family
- von Hauswolff, a Swedish noble family
