= Thesleff =

Thesleff is a surname. Notable people with the surname include:

- Alexander Amatus Thesleff (1907–1983), Finnish diplomat and lawyer
- Ellen Thesleff (1869-1954), Finnish painter
- Irma Thesleff, Finnish biologist
- Jan Thesleff (born 1959), Swedish diplomat
- Rolf Thesleff (1878–1938), Finnish educator and diplomat
- Wilhelm Alexander Thesleff (1880-1941), Finnish general
