= Diet of Porvoo =

1809 legislative assembly which established the Grand Duchy of Finland

Coordinates: 60°24′N 25°40′E

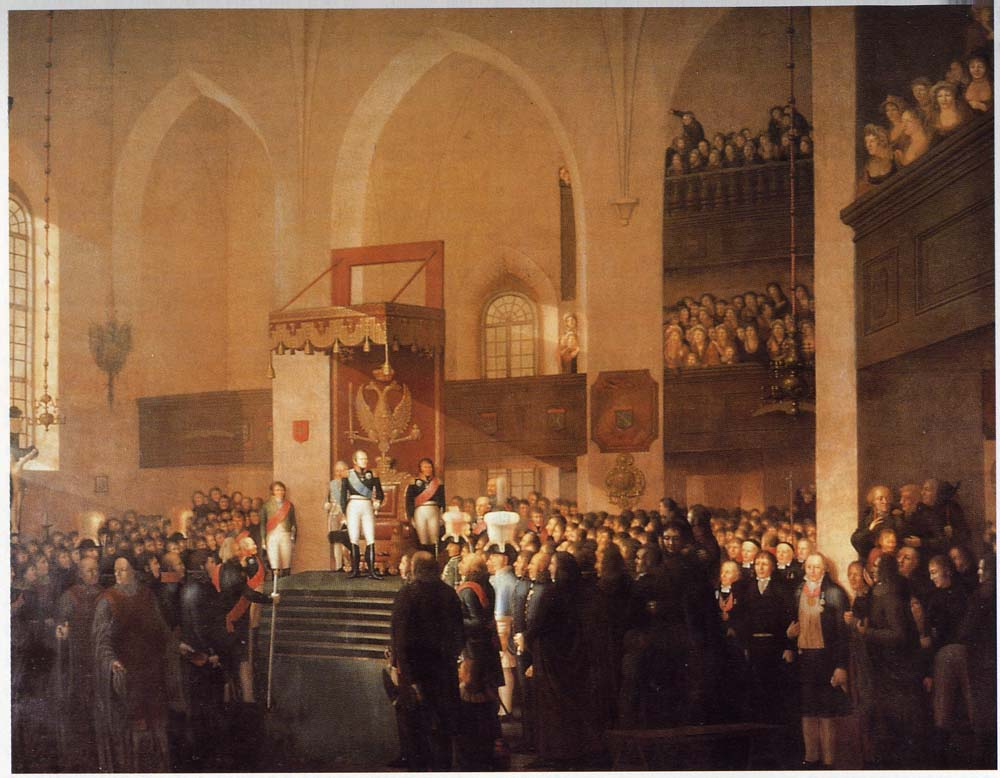
The Porvoo Diet is opened by Alexander I

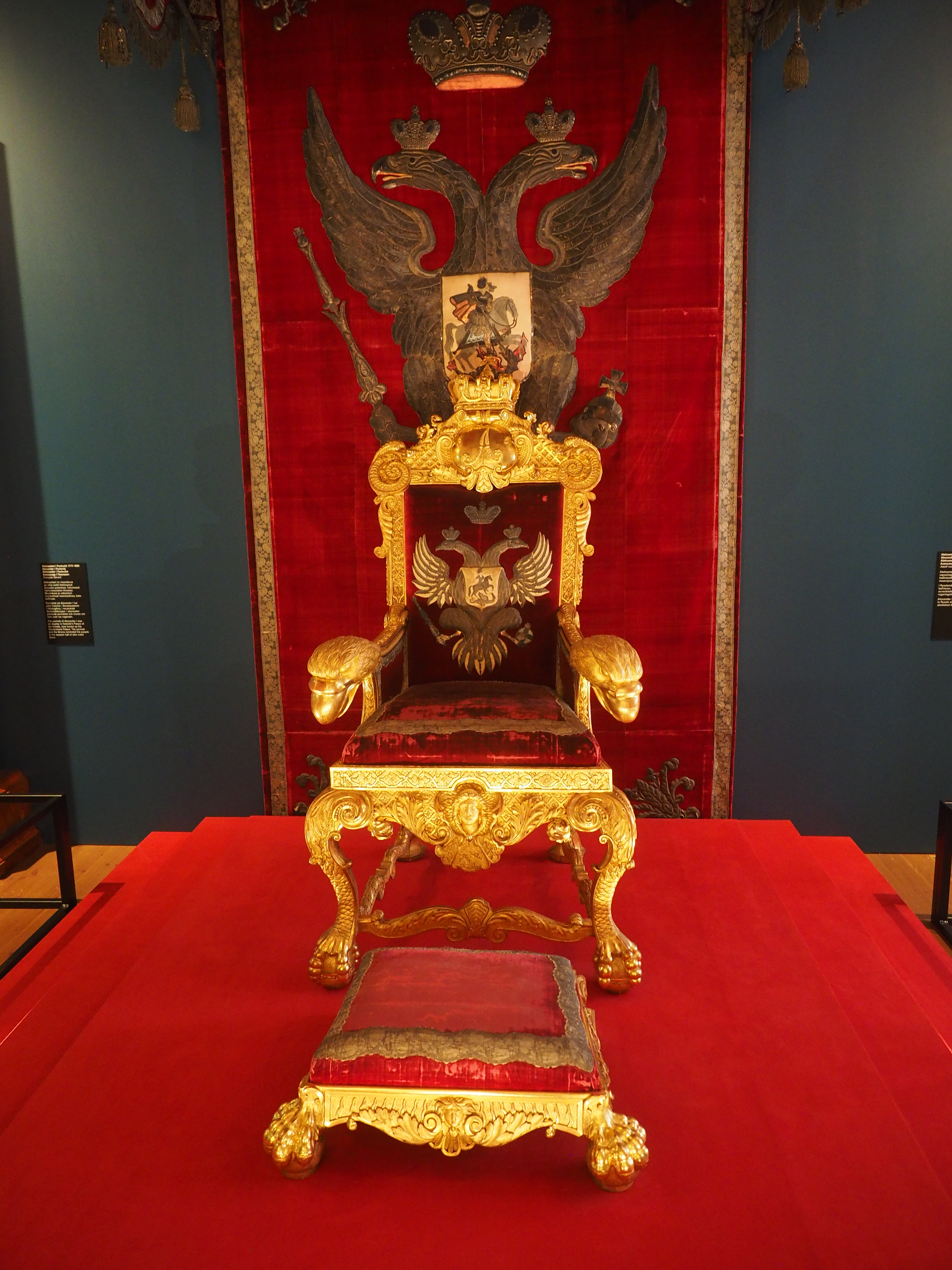
The throne that Alexander I sat on at the Diet of Porvoo is now on display at the National Museum of Finland.

The Diet of Porvoo (Finnish: Porvoon maapäivät, or unhistorically Porvoon valtiopäivät; (Note: The Finnish word for a Diet, valtiopäivät, was invented only in the mid-19th century and so calling the lantdag in Porvoo that name is unhistorical. The Swedish name for the Finnish Parliament was lantdag until 1919, when it was officially changed to riksdag. However, the Russian Emperor notably used the French word for Diet when he addressed the estates.) Swedish: Borgå lantdag; (Note: Older spelling landtdag.) Russian: Боргоский сейм), was the summoned legislative assembly to establish the Grand Duchy of Finland in 1809 and the heir of the powers of the Swedish Riksdag of the Estates. The session of the Diet lasted from March to July 1809.

During the Finnish War between Sweden and Russia, the four Estates of Russian-occupied Finland (nobility, clergy, burghers and peasants) were assembled in Porvoo (Borgå) by Tsar Alexander I, the new Grand Duke of Finland, between 25 March and 19 July 1809.

Finnish historians disagree on whether the Diet of Porvoo was the first meeting of The Estates in the history of Finland or a traditional lantdag where the eight easternmost regions of Sweden were transferred under the authority of the Emperor of Russia. According to the interpretation of the Finnish constitution born later in the 19th century, the state of Finland was born at the Diet of Porvoo. The historian Henrika Tandefelt claims that the Porvoo Diet could not have been a riksdag ("meeting of the state") as there was no state to speak of at the time.

== Preparation ==
The acting Governor-General of Finland Göran Magnus Sprengtporten made a plan for the government of Finland, which the Emperor confirmed on 1 December 1808. The delegation of the Estates in Finland had already sworn their loyalty to the Emperor in Saint Petersburg in the autumn. The delegation was told that the Emperor would be assembling a diet. Sprengtporten was given the task of preparing for the diet. The Estates received an invitation to attend the diet in Porvoo on 1 February 1809.

The decision to hold the diet in Porvoo was influenced by the still ongoing Finnish War and that the cities of Turku and Hämeenlinna were located too far away from the border to Russia. There had been a large fire in Helsinki in the previous year and there were no suitable premises for the diet in the city, neither were there any in Loviisa. So Porvoo was chosen as the location of the diet, which was opened at the Porvoo Cathedral. The main lecture hall of the Borgå Gymnasium acted as the main hall of the diet. The estate of the clergy also worked at the gymnasium. The estates of the nobility and the bourgeoisie were assembled at the Porvoo Town Hall and the estate of the peasants at the house of the lawspeaker Anders Fabian Orraeus.

== Events ==
The central event at Porvoo was the sovereign pledge and the oaths of the Estates in Porvoo Cathedral on 29 March. All of the Estates swore their oaths of allegiance, committing themselves to accepting the Emperor as Grand Duke of Finland as the true authority and to keep the constitution and the form of government unchanged. Alexander I subsequently promised to govern Finland in accordance with its laws and let the Finnish keep their religion and rights. This was thought to essentially mean that the emperor confirmed the Swedish Instrument of Government from 1772 as the constitution of Finland, although it was also interpreted to simply mean respecting other, "subordinate laws" - existing codes and other statutes.

The diet had required that it would be convened again after the Finnish War, which separated Finland from Sweden, had been concluded. On 17 September, the conflict was settled by the Treaty of Fredrikshamn, but it would take five decades for the Finnish Estates to be called again.

== Sovereign's pledge ==
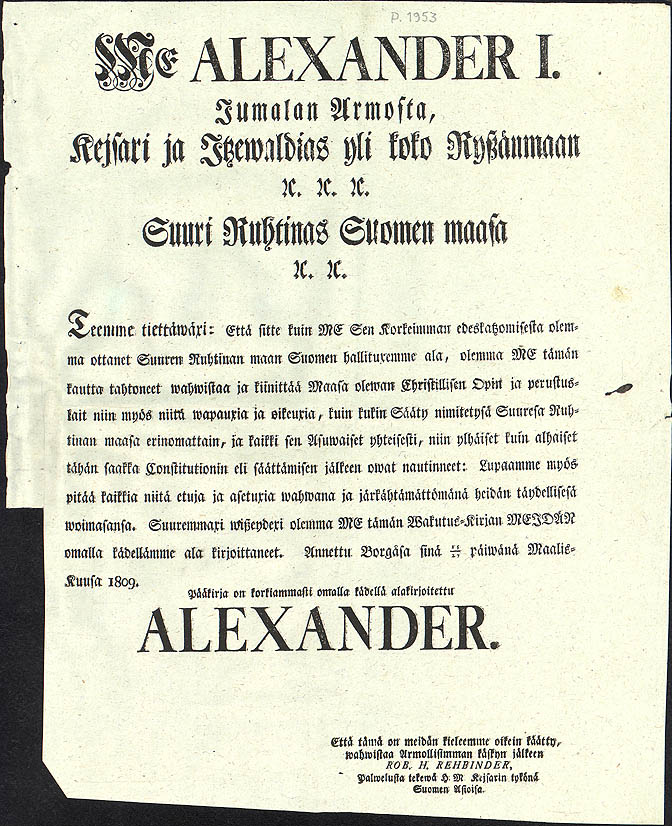
The sovereign's pledge, printed in Finnish

The Finnish translation of the sovereign's pledge given by Alexander I in old-style Finnish read as follows:

"Me Alexander I... Suuri Ruhtinas Suomen maasa... : Wakutus-Kirja... Annettu Borgåsa sinä 15/27 päiwänä Maaliskuusa 1809."

(ME ALEXANDER I., Jumalan Armosta, Kejsari ja Itsewaldias yli koko Ryssänmaan. Suuri Ruhtinas Suomen maasa Teemme tiettäwäxi: Että sitte kuin ME Sen Korkeimman edeskatsomisesta olemma ottanet Suuren Ruhtinan maan Suomen hallituxemme ala, olemma ME tämän kautta tahtoneet wahvistaa ja kiinittää Maasa olevan Christillisen Opin ja perustus- lait niin myös niitä wapauxia ja oikeuxia, kuin kukin Sääty nimitetysä Suuresa Ruh- tinan maasa erinomattain, ja kaikki sen Asuwaiset yhteisesti, niin ylhäiset kuin alhaiset tähän saakka Constitutionin eli säättämisen jälkeen owat nautinneet: Lupaamme myös pitää kaikkia niitä etuja ja asetuxia wahwana ja järkähtämättämänä heidän täydellisä woimasansa. Suuremmaxi wisseydexi olemma ME tämän Wakutus-Kirjan MEIDÄN omalla kädellämme ala kirjoittaneet. Annettu Borgåsa sinä 15/27* päiwänä Maalis- Kuusa 1809.

Pääkirja on korkiammasti omalla kädellä alakirjoitetu

ALEXANDER.)

English translation:

"We Alexander I... Grand Duke in Finland... Pledge... Given in Borgå on the 15th/27th day of March in 1809."

(WE ALEXANDER I, by the Grace of God, Emperor and Autocrat over the entire country of Russia, Grand Duke in Finland, do hereby make it known: That as WE by the providence of The Highest One have taken the Grand Duchy of Finland under our government, have WE hereby wanted to strengthen and fasten the Christian doctrine and constitutional laws in the country, as well as those liberties and rights as the each estate in the aforementioned Grand Duchy, and all its inhabitants in general, the nobles along with the commoners have thus far enjoyed under the Constitution: We also promise to upkeep all these privileges and statures in their full authority. For greater confirmation have WE signed this pledge by OUR own hand. Given at Borgå on the 15th/27th day of March in 1809.

The pledge has been signed by own hand

ALEXANDER.)

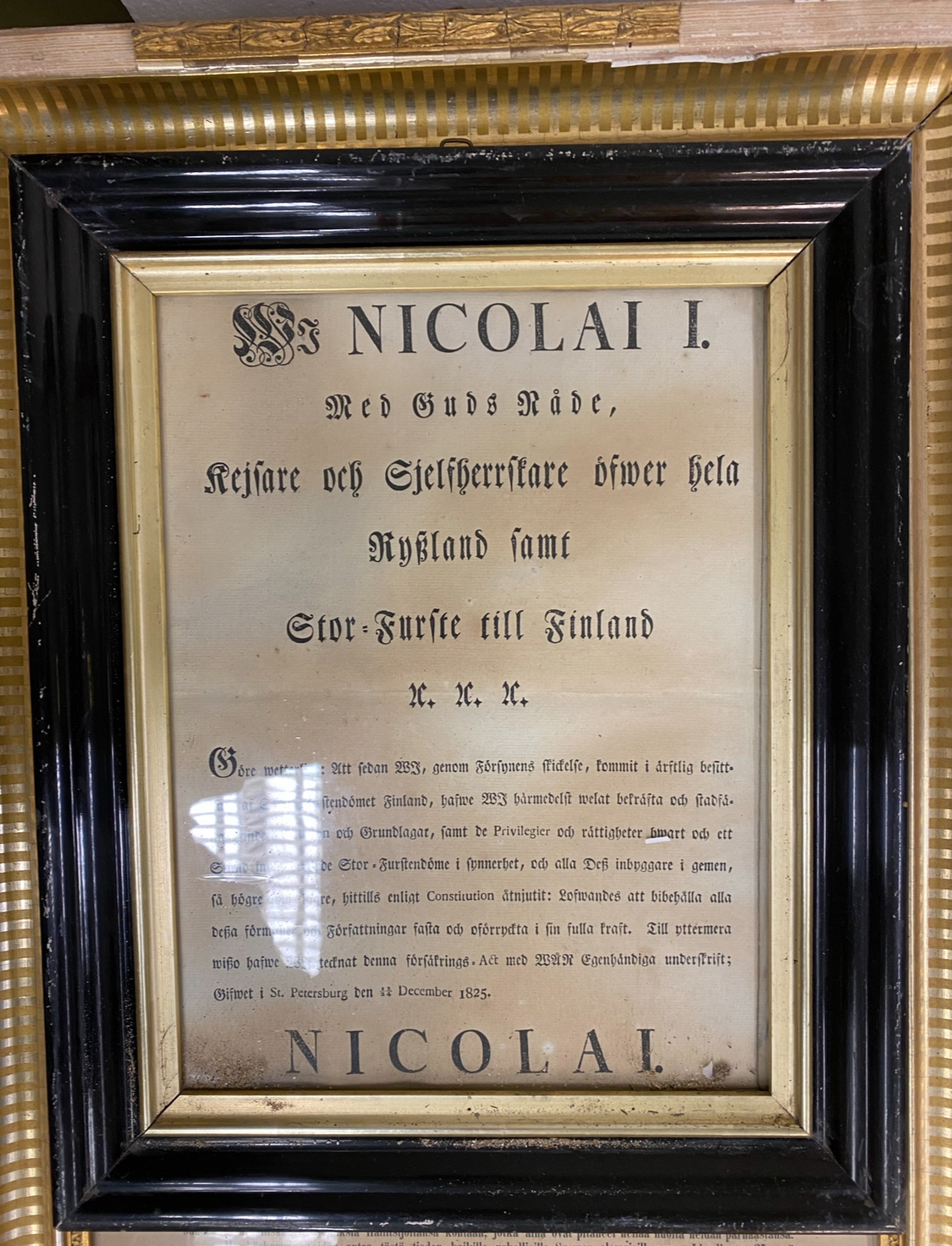
Nikolai I Sovereign's pledge

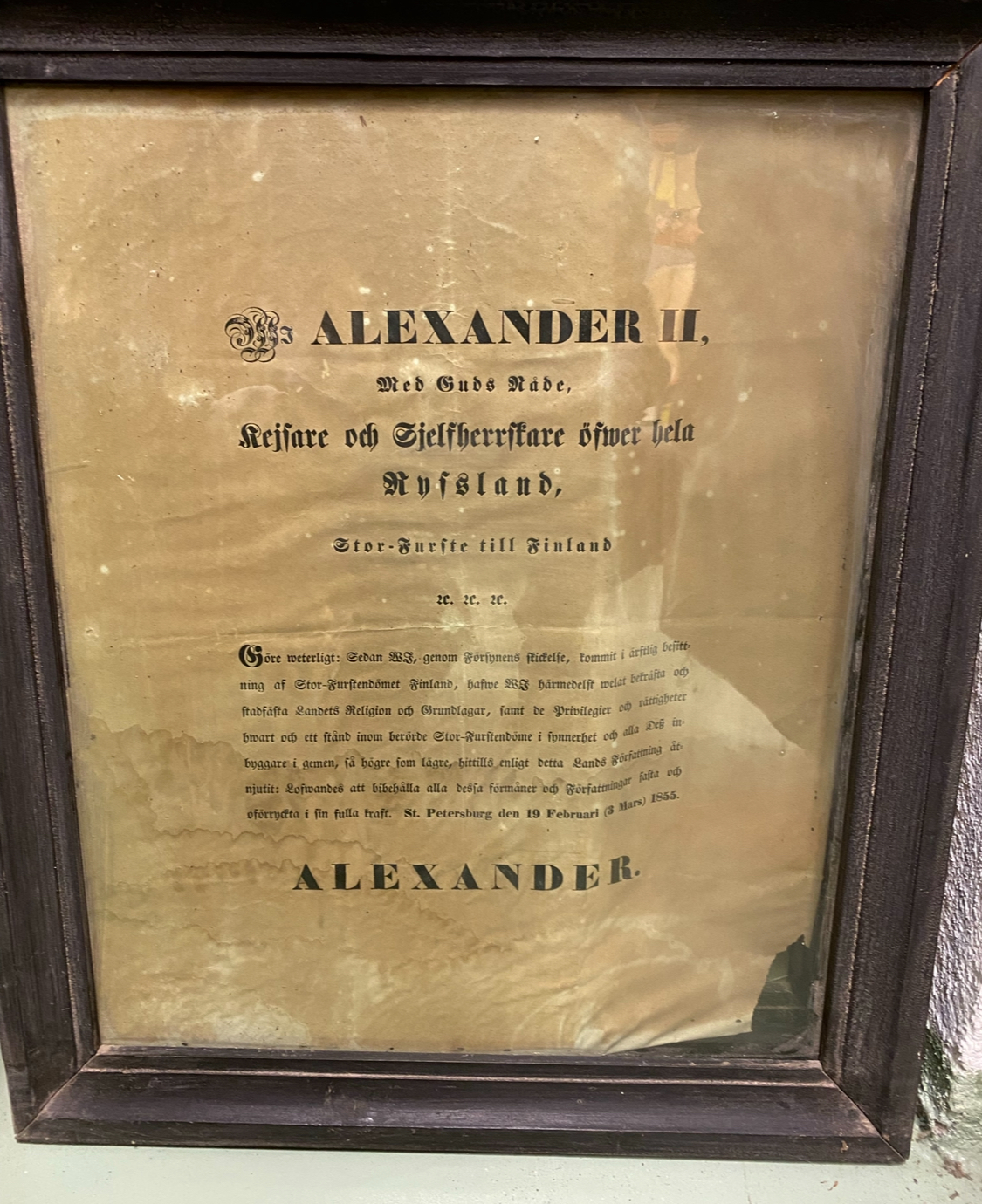
Alexander II Sovereign's pledge

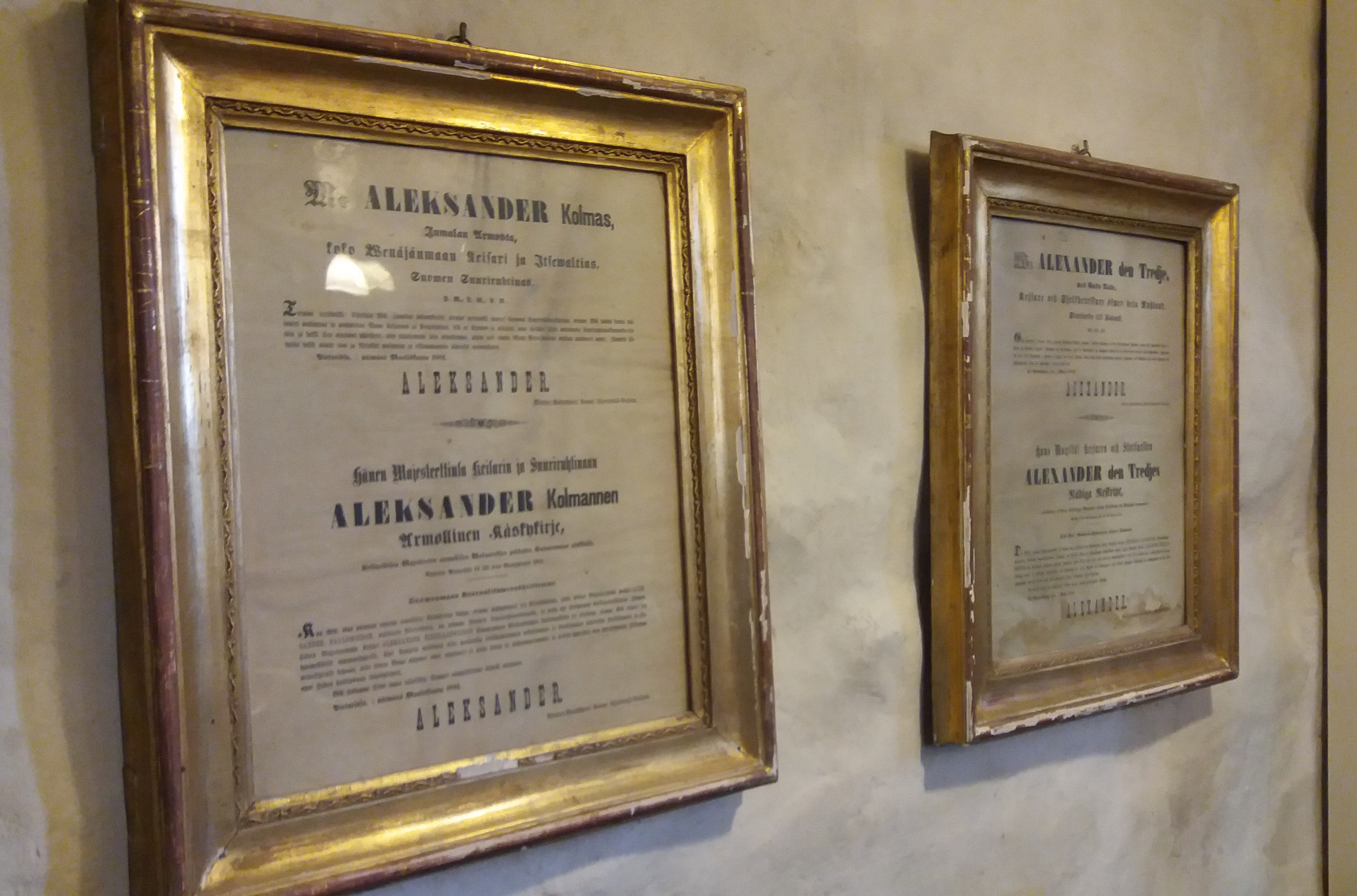
Alexander III Sovereign's pledge

== Participants ==
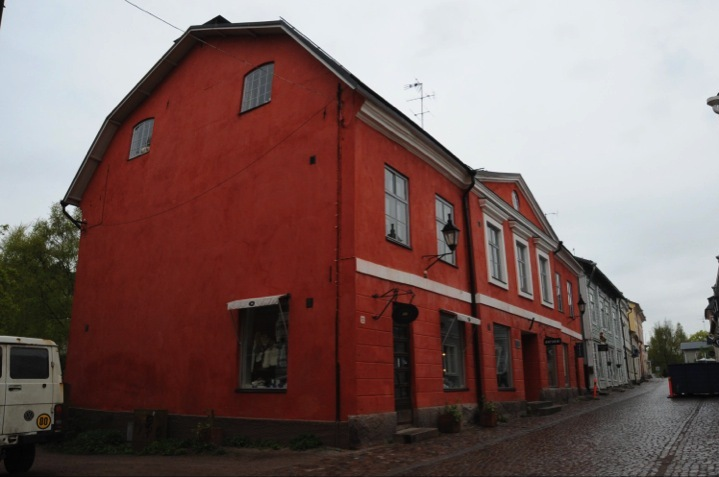
Porvoo Castle; Tsar Alexander I stayed here during the Porvoo Diet in 1809, which confirmed Finland's rights under Russian rule

The Diet of Porvoo had participants from different estates as follows:

- Nobility: 75 representatives, chairman lantmarskalk count Robert Wilhelm De Geer.
- Clergy: 8 representatives, chairman bishop of Turku Jakob Tengström
- Burghers: 20 representatives, chairman merchant Kristian Trapp, Turku
- Peasants: 31 representatives, chairman Pehr Klockars Nykarleby

Out of 205 noble families, 130 were not represented in the diet, and 60 of the representatives did not attend the opening ceremony. The burghers were represented mainly by merchants.

== Later interpretations ==
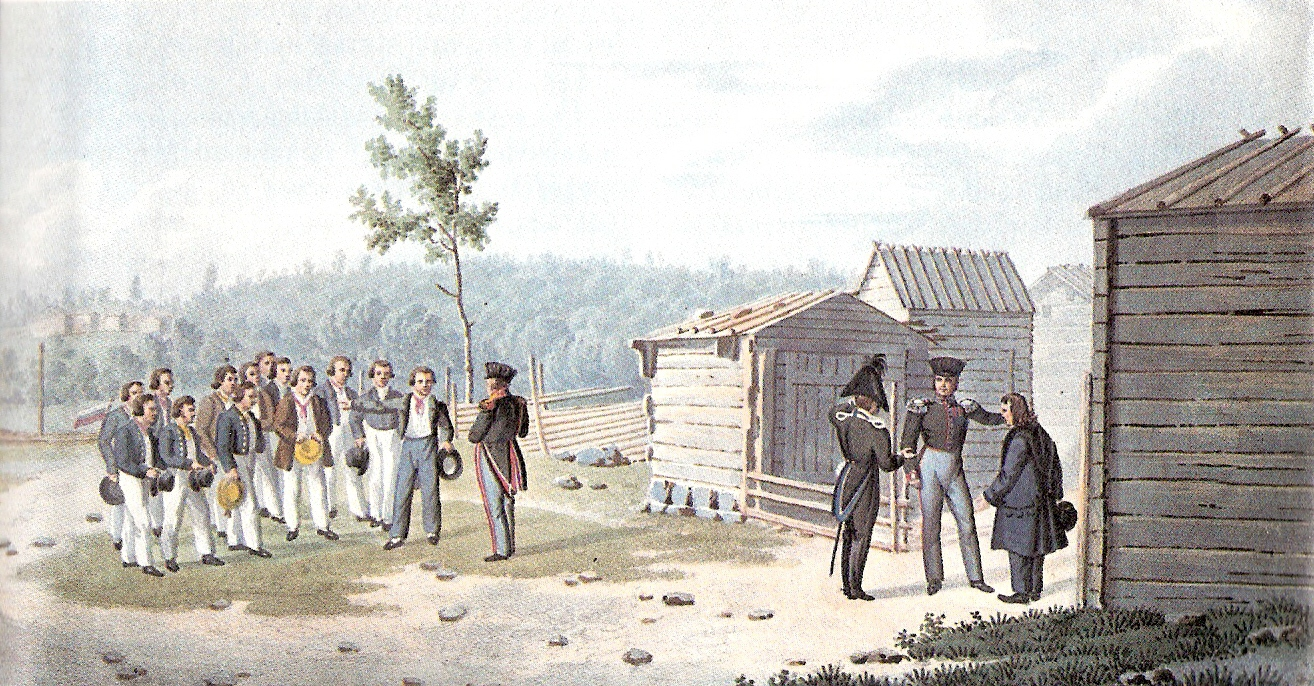
Czar Alexander I, grand duke of Finland visits Nissilä in northern Finland.

The Finns interpreted the Emperor's oath and the oath of loyalty of the Estates as a non-unilateral act that neither party, whether it be the people of Finland or the Emperor, could not unilaterally dissolve. The Russians also did not question the status of the state of Finland before the late 19th century. Their interpretation was that the Emperor could not have promised the Finns a position that would have contradicted his authority.

There has been a lot of controversy about why Finland was granted an autonomous position at the Diet of Porvoo. The reasons relating to foreign politics and national security were clearly present when the status of Finland changed. Finland had been conquered to make it into an outpost of Russia and a western protective zone for Saint Petersburg. With the autonomy, the Finns could be more easily made to favour their new ruler. The still underdeveloped Russian government also lacked the framework to which the corresponding elements in Finland could have been merged into.

During the rise of Finnish nationalism later in the 19th century, it was claimed that the Diet implied that a treaty between states had been signed at the Diet between Finland and Russia. According to Emeritus Professor Osmo Jussila of the Helsinki University, it is true that Alexander said that Finland had been raised to the status of a nation among nations, but the claim of a treaty between equals was simply a device invented for the political realities of the struggle for independence.

The meeting of the Estates in Porvoo in 1809 has been a point of question ever since the late 19th century in both politics and history. For example, according to Leo Mechelin, the connection between Finland and Russia was only a personal union between sovereign states, but many Finnish and especially Russian researchers have seen the special position of Finland as based on the Emperor's goodwill which meant he could also have dissolved it.

The Finnish term "valtiopäivät" ("state days") is also an established name for the event, but nowadays many historians speak of "maapäivät" ("land days"), which is a direct translation from the Swedish term "Borgå lantdag". There has also been a mention that the Swedish term "riksdag" could not have been used as there was no state to speak of.

== See also ==
- Diet of Finland
- Parliament of Finland
- Senate of Finland
- Governor-General of Finland
- Finnish nobility
- Finnish House of Knights and Nobility
- Kingdom of Finland (1742)
