= Carpelan =

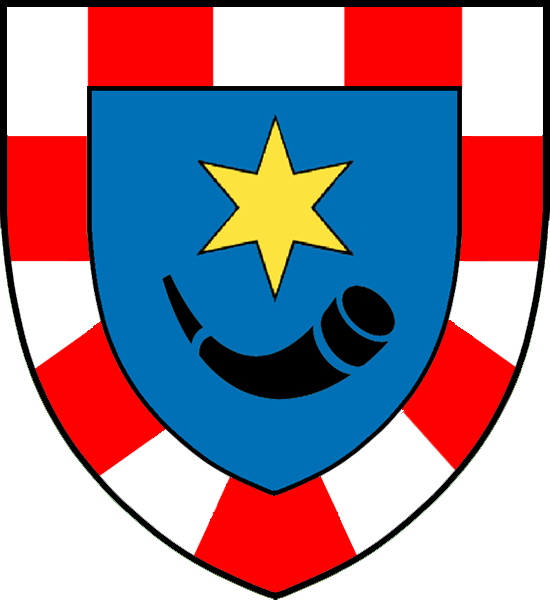
Coat of arms of Carpelan

The Carpelan family is a Finnish noble family from the Middle Ages. Members of the family were awarded with the title of Baron on 15 October 1771 by Adolf Frederick of Sweden.

== History ==
Squire Paval Karppalainen from Vehmaa, Varsinais-Suomi was ennobled in 1407 by king Eric XIII of Sweden. After the extinction of his male line, his granddaughter's son continued the family name and took up his mothers arms.

His descendants were registered under number 38 among the untitled nobility at the Swedish House of Nobility when it was established in 1625.

Vilhelm Karpelan, lieutenant general and commander of the Västerbotten Regiment, was created friherre Carpelan, together with his fraternal nephew Karl Ephraim Karpelan, lieutenant colonel, by king Adolf Frederick of Sweden on 15 October 1771. In 1776 the family was registered under number 281 among baronial class of the House.

When Finland had in 1809 become a Grand Duchy of the Russian Empire, those members of the Carpelan family who resided there and swore fealty to the Grand Duke, Emperor Alexander I, were confirmed in their noble privileges and titles as to the grand ducal estates of Finland. Accordingly, when the Finnish House of Nobility was established, the baronial family of Carpelan was registered there under number 19 among the baronial class (vapaaherrallinen suku numero 19, friherrliga ätten nummer 19).

== Famous members ==
- Bert Carpelan (1895–1981), Swedish Army officer
- Bo Carpelan (1926–2011), Finnish writer
- Wilhelm Carpelan (1778–1829), Swedish baron and official
- Wilhelm Maximilian Carpelan (1787–1830), Finnish-Swedish surveyor and cartographer

== See also ==
- The National Biography of Finland

== Sources ==
- T. Carpelan, Ättartavlor
- J. Ramsay, Frälsesläkter i Finland intill Stora ofreden
- E. Anthoni, Finlands medeltida frälse
