= Ekbom =

Ekbom is a Swedish surname. Notable people with the surname include:

- Karl-Axel Ekbom (1907–1977), Swedish neurologist
- Selim Ekbom (1807–1886), Finnish politician
- Viktor Ekbom (born 1989), Swedish ice hockey player
