= Nordenstam =

Nordenstam is a surname of Scandinavian origin.

Notable people with the name include:

- Bertil Nordenstam (born 1936), Swedish botanist
- Johan Mauritz Nordenstam (1802–1882), Finnish general and politician
- Sara Nordenstam (born 1983), Norwegian swimmer
- Stina Nordenstam (born 1969), Swedish singer-songwriter and producer
- Tore Nordenstam (born 1934), Swedish philosopher
