= Von Haartman =

Von Haartman is a Swedish-origin surname. Persons with the surname include:

- Carl "Goggi" von Haartman (1897–1980), Finnish film-maker
- Carl Daniel von Haartman (1792–1877), Finnish physician
- Lars Gabriel von Haartman (1789-1859), Finnish politician
- Karl Robert Eduard von Hartmann (1842–1906), German philosopher
- Lars von Haartman (1919–1998), Finnish ornithologist
