= Rolf Thesleff =

Finnish diplomat

Rolf Thesleff (28 May 1878 Kuopio – 16 August 1938 Copenhagen) was a Finnish PhD on Philosophy and diplomat.

Thesleff's parents were General Alexander August Thesleff and Emilia Mathilda Sanmark. He graduated from the Helsinki Finnish Normal Lyceum in 1897 and studied at the University of Helsinki completing Bachelor of Philosophy in 1902, M.Sc. (1904) and Licentiate and PhD in 1907.

Thesleff was a shareholder and owner of a loan agency in Helsinki from 1907 to 1912, as an extraordinary teacher of agrarian policy at the University of Helsinki from 1912 to 1919 and as rapporteur secretary of the Ministry of Transport and Communications in the Senate of Finland between 1918 and 1919.

He then moved to the Foreign Service and served as Envoy to Oslo in 1919-1925 and 1930–1933, in Rome from 1925 to 1930 and last in Copenhagen from 1934 to 1938.

Rolf Thesleff was married since 1903 with Master of Philosophy, author Greta von Frenckell.
