= Ollongren =

Ollongren is a surname. Notable people with the surname include:

- Alexander Ollongren (1928–2025), Dutch astronomer and computer scientist
- Kajsa Ollongren (born 1967), Dutch-Swedish politician, daughter of Alexander
