= Wilhelm Carpelan =

Swedish baron and official (1778–1829)

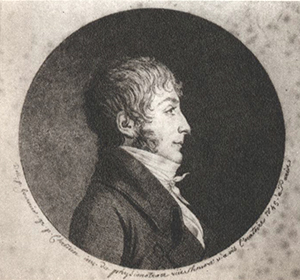
Wilhelm Carpelan; by G.-L. Chrétien (c.1810)

Baron Fredrik Wilhelm Carpelan (1778–1829), from the Carpelan family, was a Swedish baron and official. He was secretary of state for war from 1809 to 1810, and was crucial in the developing of Sweden's postal service.
