= Rödiger =

Rödiger is a German surname. Notable people with the surname include:

- Aleksandr Roediger (1854–1920) Russian Minister of War
- Alexander Rödiger (born 1985), German bobsledder
- Emil Rödiger (1801–1874), German orientalist
