= Tigerstedt =

Tigerstedt is a Swedish surname. Notable persons with that name include:

- Eric Tigerstedt (1887–1925), Finnish inventor
- Robert Tigerstedt (1853–1923), Finnish medical scientist
- E. N. Tigerstedt (1907–1979) Finnish-Swedish literary historian and Plato scholar
