= Östgöta Correspondenten =

Daily newspaper in Sweden

- Type: Daily newspaper
- Format: Tabloid
- Owner(s): Norrköpings Tidningar AB
- Founder(s): Henrik Bernhard Palmær
- Publisher: Correspondenten i Linköping AB
- Founded: 24 September 1838; 187 years ago
- Language: Swedish
- Headquarters: Linköping
- Circulation: 39,900 (2019)
- Website: Corren

Östgöta Correspondenten, commonly known as Corren, is a daily Swedish language newspaper in Linköping, Sweden.

== History and profile ==
Östgöta Correspondenten was first published in Linköping in 1838. The founder of the paper was Henrik Bernhard Palmær. Corren was controlled by the Ridderstad family for 168 years, but was sold to Norrköpings Tidningar AB in 2008 for SEK 700 million. The publisher of the paper is Correspondenten i Linköping AB.

The paper was published in broadsheet format until 1 February 2005 when it switched to tabloid format. The stated position of the editorial page is liberal.

== Circulation ==
In 1998 the circulation of Östgöta Correspondenten was 67,000 copies. The paper had a circulation of 67,200 copies in 2000 and 63,000 copies in 2003 and 62,000 copies in 2004. The circulation of the paper was 48,900 copies in 2012 and 39,900 copies in 2019.

== See also ==
- List of Swedish newspapers
