= Moland Church =

Moland Church may refer to:

- Moland Church (Fyresdal), a church in Fyresdal municipality in Telemark county, Norway
- Austre Moland Church, a church in Arendal municipality in Agder county, Norway
- Vestre Moland Church, a church in Lillesand municipality in Agder county, Norway
