= Robert C. Bergenheim =

American journalist and editor

- Born: January 19, 1924
- Died: June 5, 2010 (aged 86)
- Occupation: Journalist
- Relatives: Richard Bergenheim (son)

Robert Carlton Bergenheim (January 19, 1924 – June 5, 2010) was an American journalist and editor who founded the Boston Business Journal, which published its first issue on March 2, 1981. He also served as the publisher of the now defunct Boston Herald American during the 1970s. He was a Nieman Fellow.

Bergenheim was raised in Dorchester, Massachusetts. He enlisted in the United States Navy in 1944 during World War II, serving in the Pacific theater. He was selected for a fellowship from the Nieman Foundation for Journalism at Harvard University, where he graduated in 1954. Bergenheim began his career at The Christian Science Monitor.

Robert Bergenheim died at his home in Naples, Florida, of several health complications on June 5, 2010, at the age of 86. He was survived by his wife, the former Elizabeth McKee, whom he married in 1947; two daughters, Carol and Kristine; four sons, Robert, Roger, Ronald, and Michael; a granddaughter; and four grandsons. His fifth son, Richard, who died in 2008, was the editor in chief of The Christian Science Monitor from 2005 to 2008.
