= Finnish nobility =

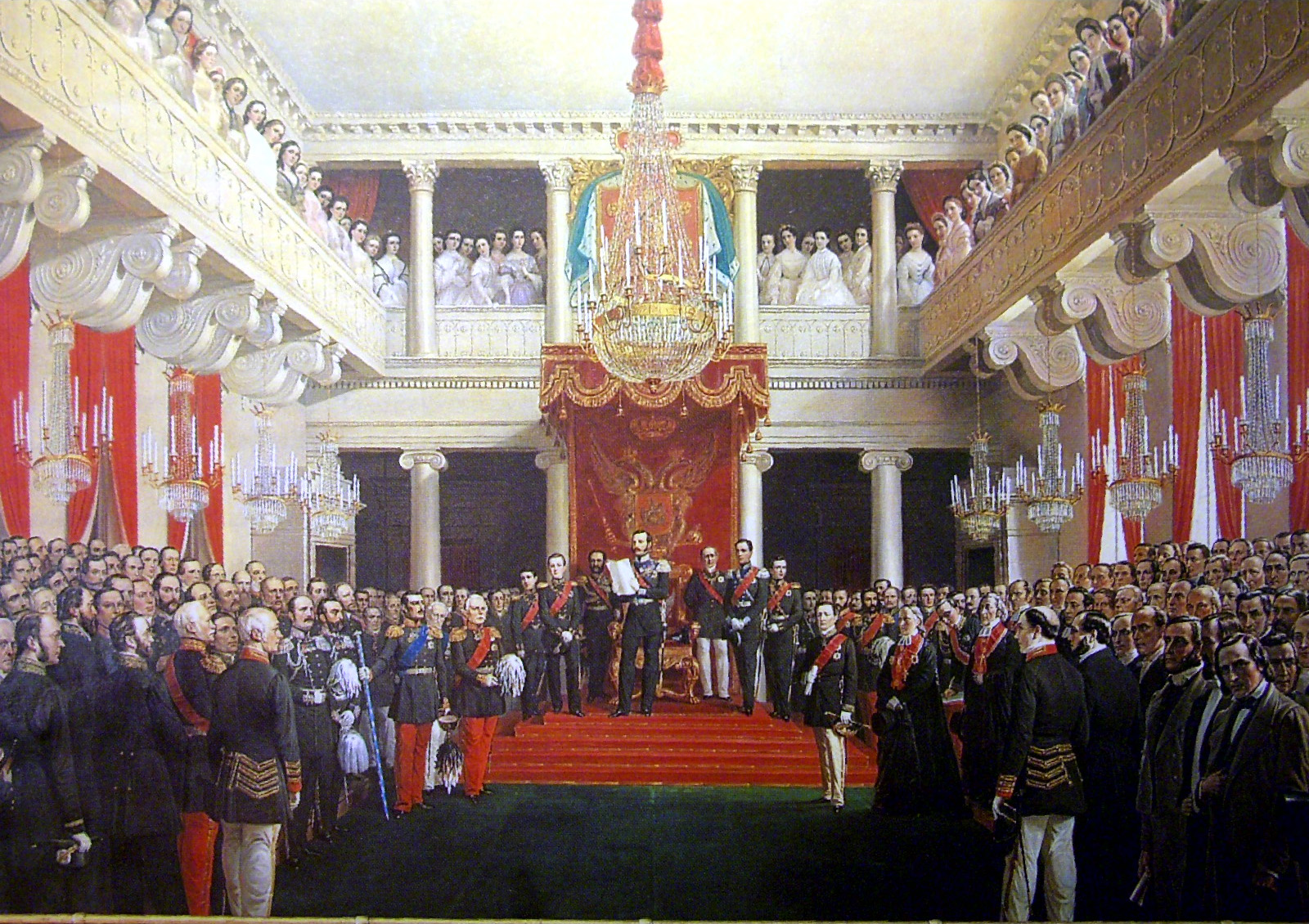
The Diet of Finland in 1863. Grand Duke of Finland, Emperor of Russia Alexander II opened the Diet in Helsinki.

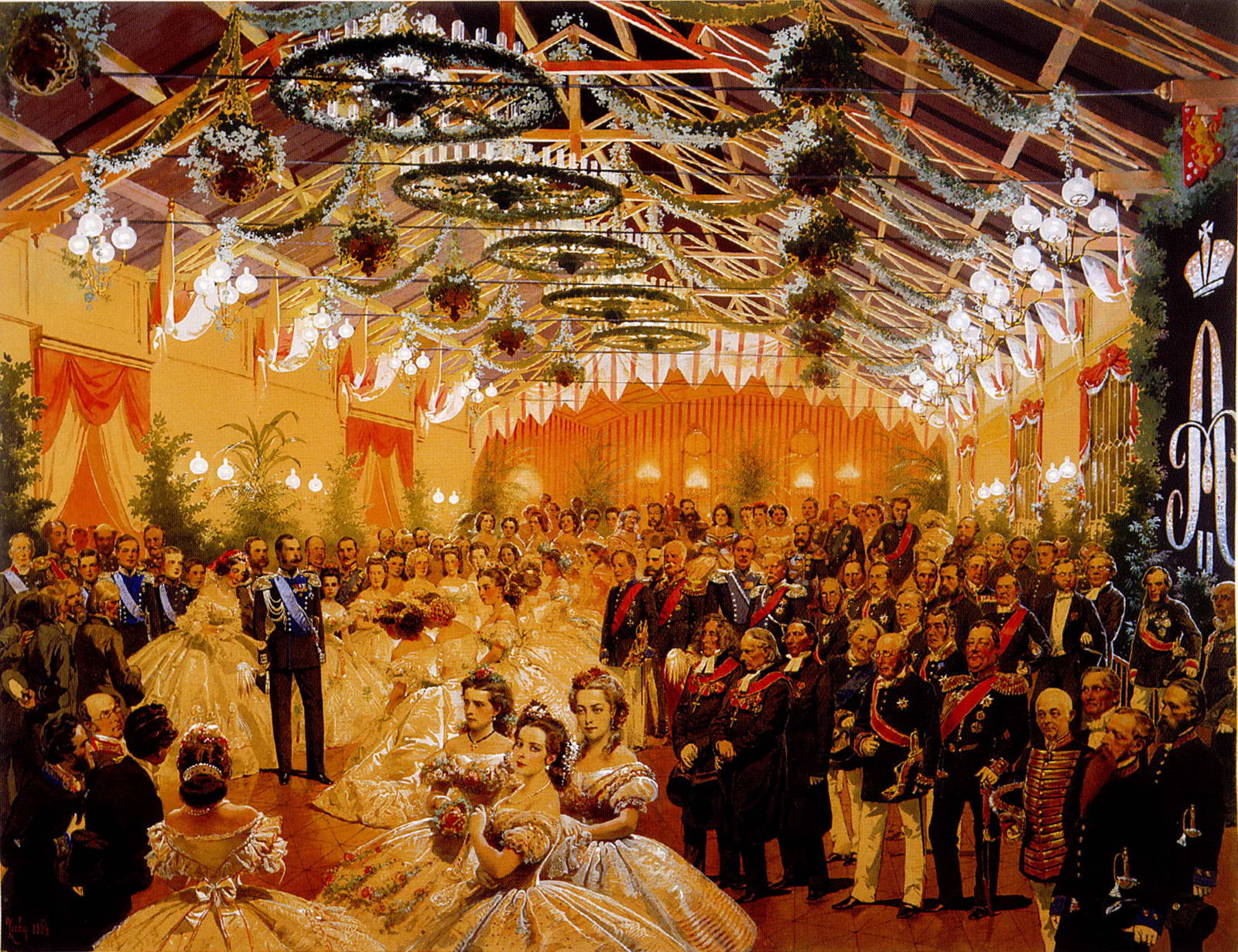
Grand Duchy of Finland arranged a Grand Ball in honour of the Grand Duke of Finland, Emperor of Russia Alexander II in Helsinki in 1863.

The Finnish nobility (Finnish: Aateli; Swedish: Adel) was historically a privileged class in Finland, deriving from its period as part of Sweden and the Russian Empire. Noble families and their descendants are still a part of Finnish republican society, but except for the titles themselves, no longer retain any specific or granted privileges. A majority of Finnish nobles have traditionally been Swedish-speakers using their titles mostly in Swedish. The Finnish nobility today has some 6,000 male and female members.

The Finnish nobility is organized into classes according to a scheme introduced in the Act on the Organisation of the House of Nobility (Fi. Ritarihuonejärjestys, Sw. Riddarhusordningen). The ranks (compare with royal and noble ranks) granted were (Swedish / Finnish):

- furste / ruhtinas (corresponding approximately to, in the German sense, a Sovereign Prince, like Albert II, Sovereign Prince of Monaco for instance)
- greve / kreivi (corresponding to Count)
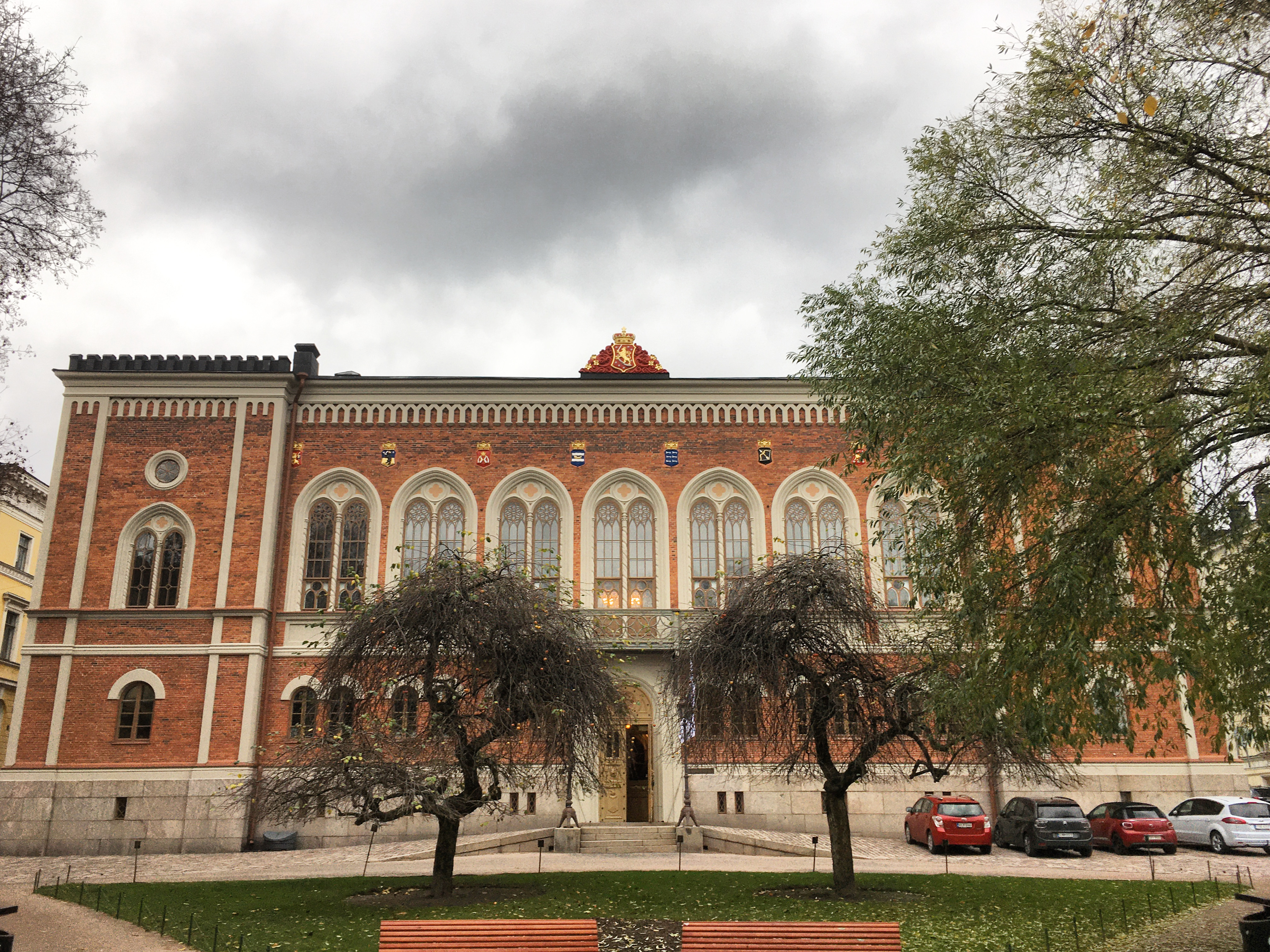
- The House of Nobility in Helsinki, Finland.
  friherre / vapaaherra (corresponding approximately to baron)
- riddare / ritari (translated as "knights", but actually equivalent to English baronets, since the rank is heritable) a higher class of untitled nobility, which was formed for descendants of members of the Royal Council of Sweden and in 1778 came to include the eldest families and the families of knight commanders of royal chivalric orders; this class encompassed 73 families in Finland. The class was merged with the untitled nobility in 1863.
- herr (svenneklassen) / herra (asemiesluokka), untitled nobility.

Under the above Act on the Organisation of the House of Nobility, the head of each family had a seat in the House. There also existed a proxy system according to which the head of the family could be represented by another male member of the same family or even by a male member of another family by proxy.

Finnish Dukes after the Middle Ages were always princes of the reigning family, and counted as such.

Following elevation into nobility by the monarch, the key concept was that of "introduction" to ones peers at the House of Nobility (Fi. Ritarihuone / Sw. Riddarhuset), which was a chamber in the Diet of Finland (1809–1906), the then Parliament, and in the Riksdag of the Estates of Sweden to which Finland belonged until 1809. The House of Nobility served as an official representation for the nobility regulated by the Finnish government, but regulation has decreased in step with the privileges. Virtually all noble families have been introduced (with the exception of some members of foreign nobility that, while having been naturalized to the royal court, have never been introduced; and some grantees of nobility who had no heirs and did not bother), and their members are listed in a calendar published regularly (usually every three years).

In Finland, the nobility was generally sparser in resources than, and not as powerful as, its brethren in Sweden.

== Medieval nobility ==
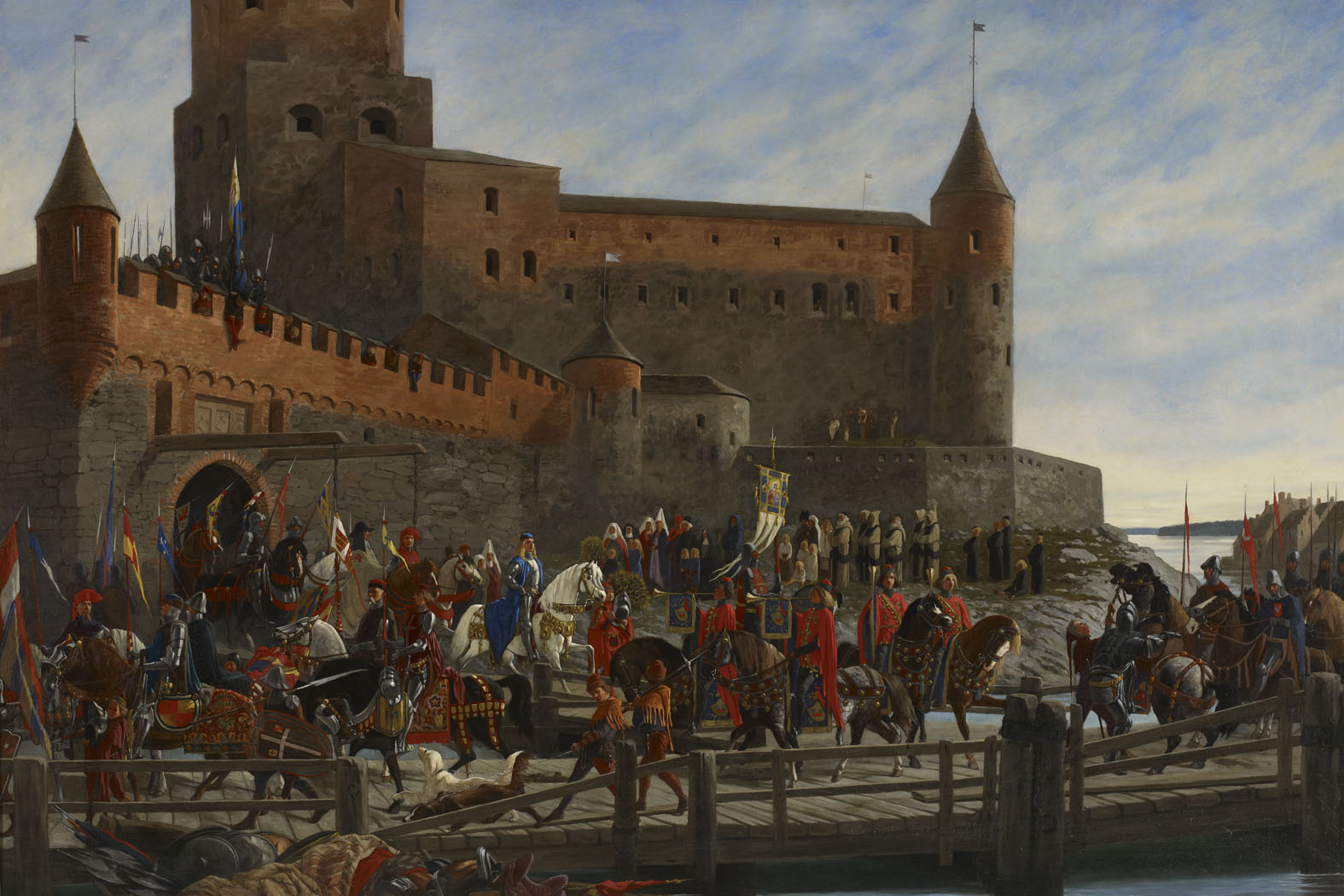
Karl Knutson Bonde leaving Vyborg Castle for the Royal Election in Stockholm, 1448. He was elected as the King of Sweden.

The formal nobility in Finland dates back to 1280 when it was agreed in the entire Swedish realm by the Decree of Alsnö that magnates who could afford to contribute to the cavalry with a heavily equipped horse-soldier were to be exempted from tax - at least from ordinary land taxes - as the clergy already had been. The archaic term for nobility, frälse, also includes the clergy when referring to their exemption from tax.

The background was that the outmoded system of a leiðangr fleet and a king on constant travels in the realm (between the estates of Uppsala öd) was in need of replacement. The crown's court and castles were now to be financed through taxes on land.

Quite soon, conditions were attached: land up to certain amount was tax-exempted in exchange for one soldier. Wealthier magnates took it upon themselves to maintain several soldiers, in order to have tax exemption for their other manors. The concept of the nature of land, if it was frälsejord, exempt from land taxes or not, evolved and was registered on tax rolls. From the 17th century onwards, non-nobles were not allowed to purchase noble land (but they might however inherit it).

Generally, the nobility grew from wealthier or more powerful members of the peasantry, those who were capable of assigning work or wealth to provide the requisite cavalrymen. In Finland, there never existed outright serfdom. Hence, nobility was basically a class of well-off citizens, not owners of other human beings. In the Middle Ages and much of the modern age, nobles and other wealthy men were landowners, as well as lords of villeins and servants. Members of the nobility utilized their economic power and sometimes also other powers to have smaller farmowners sell their lands to manor lords, so landowning centralized gradually more in the hands of the noble class.

Cavalry and battle exercises (often in forms of tournaments) became the lifestyle of the nobility, as it already was in feudal Western Europe. Usually, a lord was himself one of the soldiers, being the commander of his military retinue, a heavily equipped, constantly exercised mounted warrior, often with destrier, and pursuing the royal grant of knighthood which was a valued title and formed an upper level of the nobility (the uppermost was the circle of royal councillors). Some lesser noblemen remained squires, armigers for their whole lives. Sometimes a nobleman was himself the only soldier that his manor provided for the cavalry and possibly with less-than-adequate equipment. In some cases, some impoverished nobles provided a cavalryman together (it was actually unavoidable if a manor of lesser gentry was divided between several heirs, as the Swedish inheritance law provided, contrary to the primogeniture inheritances of French countries). It was also possible to have the obligation fulfilled by a paid employee - no particular condition required the lord himself to be a soldier (as evidenced by lord Bo Jonsson Grip, fiefholder of most of Finland, never becoming a soldier himself), it was just the evolving lifestyle of the noble class.

Soon it was also agreed that the king should govern the Swedish realm (to which Finland belonged) in cooperation with a Privy Council (or Royal Council) where the bishops and the most distinguished magnates (i.e. the noble most prominent economic contributors to the army) participated. When troublesome decisions were necessary all of the frälse was summoned to diets. Finland sometimes had its own assemblies for the nobility, provincial diet, convened by royal order.

The Finnish nobility had no hereditary fiefs except for a brief period in the early modern era. If they were appointed to a crown castle, their heirs couldn't claim their civil or military authority as inheritance. The lands of the magnates who were the medieval nobility were their own, allodial properties, and not "on lease" from a feudal king. If by their own means (including the suffering of the local peasantry) they built a castle, and financed troops, then the castle was theirs, but the troops, of course, were additionally expected to serve as a part of the realm's army.

For extended periods the medieval commanders of Viborg castle, on the border with republic of Novgorod, did in practice function as margraves, keeping all the crown's incomes from the fief to use for the defense of the realm's eastern border. However, it was not formally hereditary, though almost all appointees were from certain families, related to the Swedish earldom of Orkney. See Margraviate of Wiburg.

Sporadically, at the very uppermost level of feudal society, the position of Duke of Finland was created, three times for a brother of a king and once for a more distant relative, Bengt Algotsson, from a family of high nobility.

Frederick III, Holy Roman Emperor granted the archdeacons of Turku an HRE estate and status as ecclesiastical counts palatine (pfalzgrave) during the tenure of Magnus of Särkilax (later bishop Magnus III). This foreign honour was used also by his archdeaconal successors, at least catholic ones, but sometime in the next centuries it fell into disuse.

Despite the heavy German influence during the medieval age, the elaborate German system, with numerous specific - especially comital - titles such as Landgraf, Reichsgraf, Burggraf and Pfalzgraf, was never applied as such in Finnish fiefs and nobility.

Medieval Finnish frälse families included those of Särkilax, Tavast, Karp, Horn, Villnäs, Kurk of Laukko, Lepaa, Fincke, Dufva, Harviala, Sydänmaa, Karppalainen, Boije, Hästesko, Jägerhorn af Spurila, Pora (Spore), Gesterby and Sarvlax, as well as foreign-originated but establishedly Finlandic Danske, Fleming, Frille, Bidz and Diekn.

The previous basis of entrance to the frälse was mostly demolished by Gustav I of Sweden in 1536 when he, among his rearrangements of the military, made a new organization of the cavalry. Practically continuing the old system of a large farm (manor) maintaining a cavalryman, he created a new name for these, rusthåll, and greatly enlarged their number. A rusthåll, generally speaking a plain manor, was to support a horseman, his horse and equipment, in exchange for tax exemption. This no longer carried a noble status with it, and the cavalryman was not required to permanently be in the king's garrisons, but was summoned to service only for wartime, being allowed to remain in the farm in peacetime, off-duty (after a century, this became obsolete as Sweden was continuously at war somewhere, or maintained all-too-big an empire, wherefore off-duty for cavalrymen became an unknown concept). This organization did not change in essence when in 1682 Charles XI of Sweden introduced the new Swedish allotment system, where rusthålls continued as its cavalry element. (In the 1st century of rusthålls, the farm owner himself often served as a cavalry soldier, but later that role was often filled by a hired employee, who enjoyed a rider croft and pay from the farm. Thus, in later centuries, owners of rusthåll again became a sort of local higher class, though not endowed with formal nobility. In exceptional cases, one rusthåll could support as many as seven horsemen. The system of rusthålls continued until the 19th century in Finland.) People thus lost in 1536 the original entranceway to the frälse which continued to enjoy its privileges, continuing to provide cavalrymen on behalf of their allodial manors, and becoming a much more closed class.

== Swedish nobility in Finland (between 1561 and 1809) ==
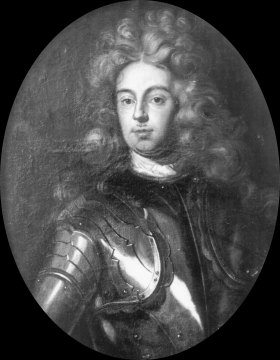
Baron Gabriel Kurck (1630-1712)

On one hand Finland, and on the other the Sweden proper, west of the Gulf of Bothnia, had approximately equal number of nobles. This was a medieval legacy and lasted the whole 16th century. According to research, the number of adult-aged male nobles, in average, was around 300–400 in Sweden proper and around 250–350 in Finland. (Actually, in the 1520s, their number was exceptionally low in Sweden proper, only 174, whereas the more usual size, 320, inhabited in Finland. This was in part a result of executions of the Stockholm bloodbath and other killings just around 1520.) However, their social level differed drastically.

A minority of all nobility belonged to an informal circle of high nobility, measured by wealth, High Councillorships held by the family, and impressive medieval ancestors. Lower nobility was a larger group, clearly lower in terms of wealth, position and respect from social, economic and political regard. Generally, their members made cavalry service on behalf of one farm, or just a few in maximum. There was only a fraction of tax-exempted noble land in Finland compared with its proportion in Sweden proper. The Swedish manors were much concentrated in hands of families of high nobility. In Finland, as the contrary case, the nobility was generally so-called soldier nobility, and the vast majority of Finnish noble families had only one or at most, a few of manors, and mostly were regarded as lower nobility.

However, the situation of the 16th century favored soldiers, because the kingdom was in almost constant external warfare and kings trusted their military officers much more than other nobles, also when building administrative machineries. Soldier nobility gained even some improvements to their position and wealth, whereas in general the noble class and its privileges were decreasing in importance during the harsh early Vasa kings. Soldier nobles from Finland benefited from this development.

Already in the late Middle Ages, some distinction had been occasionally made between on one hand tax exemption; and on the other hand a proper ennoblement. It was part of the custom that only kings were entitled to dub knights and ennoble, while in addition several other authorities, including at least important castellans of big castle fiefs, were able to grant tax exemption (sv: 'frälse', fi: 'rälssi') to landholdings and useful local gentrymen. Only the increasing precision (and greed for tax revenues) of the Vasa kings brought implications of these differences afront in 16th century and particularly then in 17th century when the House of Nobility had been established. While a number of not-ennobled families with 'rälssi' rights were ultimately allowed to enroll to the House, also a vast number of 'rälssi' families (which did not have a proper documentation of any grant of nobility left, and generally were of the poorer scale of the rälssi class) were not accepted. One of latter groups (which has gained wider awareness in historical research) was the Squires of Vehkalahti ('Vehkalahden knaapit').

At the time of Late Middle Ages, Latin was still the language of instruction from the secondary school upwards and in use among the educated class and priests. As Finland was part of Sweden for more than 600 years, Swedish was the language of the nobility, administration and education. Hence the two highest estates of the realm, i.e. nobles and priests, had Swedish as the language of the gentry. In the two minor estates, burghers and peasants, Swedish also held sway, but in a more varying degree depending on regional differences.

In the entire 16th century, only a moderate number of ennoblements actually took place. The size of the Finnish and the Swedish nobility did not increase by much. Nobility in general was yet formed of so-called old nobility.

Already Gustav I of Sweden appointed exceptionally many Finnish nobles as High Councillors of the Realm, partly because of trust and loyalty, partly because almost all adult male Swedish high nobles had been efficiently axed just a few of years earlier by Christian II and thus were not available for appointments.

At the coronation of King Eric XIV in 1561, some nobility became hereditary, when the hereditary higher titles of greve (Count) and friherre (Baron) were created (two of the grantees were ethnically Finnish: Lord Lars Ivarsson Fleming, 1st Baron of Sundholm (Fi. Arvasalo), and lord Klas Kristersson [Horn], 1st Baron of Åminne (Fi. Joensuu); and their designated baronial estates were in Finland). In Eric's reign, those titles were intended to be inherited in an English and French manner, eldest heir succeeding. (This is attested by several examples: Nils Sture, eldest son of Count of Vestervik and Stegeholm, was personally titled Baron of Hörningsholm during the lifetime of his father, and not a count himself. Also, king Eric made one younger son, Erik Gustavsson Stenbock, of a baron, Gustav Olavsson of barony Torpa, a baron also, in order to him have the title and status too - that grant was made in same occasion as father's elevation.) Eric's successor, King John III of Sweden, however changed the rules into more German and Polish model, allowing all male-line members of a comital or a baronial family to have the same title, although the senior member was the "Head of the House" and held the actual county or the baronial estate (John's alteration however caused another development: if the male-line family became extinct, the title extinguished too - in France and England model, heiresses were often entitled to succeed to family's baronies and counties in case of brothers dying out). John III also recognized all nobility as formally hereditary when he decreed that a noble not capable of maintaining a cavalryman lost neither the tax exemption of the nobility nor the rank (in 1536 John's father Gustav I had already introduced non-noble sources of cavalrymen, the so-called rusthåll organization). The Swedish House of Nobility was organized in 1626. For a list of Lord Marshals of the nobility (the chairmen of the House of Nobility), see fi:Maamarsalkka. Rigid, formal ranks were established, in place of a fluctuating network of relationships and a somewhat open entry. The requisite ground for introduction to the rolls of nobility was either birth into an "ancient" noble family, or ennoblement by the king. A great interest in genealogy ensued.

The feudal system of maintaining a cavalry soldier as the requisite of nobility vanished gradually at same time in the 16th century when nobility became an established and restricted class and officially hereditary, not allowing for example marriages with commoners without loss of nobility of children. Frälse grew gradually more restricted as a class, and also economically less feasible to be granted just for one cavalryman.

In the 16th century, Finland had a relatively high number of recognized noble families (derived often from the Middle Ages), whereas in Sweden proper, the proportionally much rarer nobility often was at the level of high nobility (which is measured by having members of the royal council as ancestors) as Fleming and Wadenstierna. Only a few Finnish families can be seen as recognized high nobles. This high number of lower nobility in Finland is explained to come from its military location, there having been a constant need of tapping the frälse system for troops and officers which led to a high number of ennoblements to Finland, whereas Sweden proper had lived more peacefully as to foreign wars and additionally had its nobility axed from time to time by civil war.

According to several precedents, medieval nobility was inheritable in female line in case of extinction of male line (and sometimes just because of inheritance of the manor with frälse status), shown for example by the accepted introductions (registrations) of later Stiernkors, Carpelan and Kurck female-line families to the rolls of nobility.

There was a special group of petty nobility, the so-called knapadel, derived from the last centuries of the Middle Ages, who generally were not able to produce a royal letter of ennoblement to support their status. Regarding certain districts where there existed a disproportionally high number of such families, their introduction to the House of Nobility was often denied. However, in most cases, such petty noble families were ultimately registered as nobles (the concept of "ancient nobility" was a loose one, in many cases demonstrated only by privileges enjoyed for a long time, for example in taxation or holding offices). Thus, quite many families confirmed in their nobility in the 17th century were presumably actually without any original royal ennoblement, but only became frälse by decisions of past royal bailiffs of castles and such.

Nobility's marriages became restricted: generally, only a noblewoman was eligible for valid marriage of a nobleman in order to transmit the noble status to children. Because before 17th-century mass ennoblements, the number of nobles was actually only in hundreds, daughters of lower nobility became more often brides for wealthy Swedish noble families and even for magnate families. This was one of reasons why many Swedish family of high nobility got also one or more Finnish foremothers (a phenomenon very rare in medieval centuries when already geography was a sort of obstacle). Finnish nobles very often moved to other parts of the realm, to have an office in military or in government.

Count Axel Oxenstierna, 1st Count of Södermöre, the Lord High Chancellor of Sweden, was the architect of the Instrument of Government of 1634, which laid the foundation of modern Sweden, and in extension that of Finland. It secured that all government appointments had to be filled by candidates from the nobility, a move which helped to mobilize support for, rather than opposition against, a centralized national government. This helped a lot of low-nobility Finns to a more or less lucrative career.

Due to the many wars, the crown needed a means to reward officers, and since cash was not plentiful, ennoblement and grants of land and other fiefs (rights to draw taxes) were used instead. During the 17th century, the number of noble families grew by a factor of five, an immense new influx being generated by royal ennoblements of hitherto commoners. (Most Swedish nobles derive their nobility no further than from ennoblements of the 17th century, usually military officers, or from 18th century ennoblements of usually civil servants.) In a few decades in midst of 17th century, the nobility's share of Swedish land rose from 16% to over 60%, which led to considerably lower tax incomes. The "reductions" of 1655 and 1680 however brought back most of that land to the crown.

Between 1561 and 1680, there thus existed tens of official baronies and counties, fiefs, in the area of Finland.

When a family was ennobled, it was usually given a name - just as lordships of England and other Western European countries. In 17th and 18th centuries, he name only rarely was the original family name of the ennobled, rather they chose fanciful new names. This was a period which produced a myriad of two-word Swedish-language finery names for nobility (very favored prefixes were Adler, "noble"; Ehren - "ära", "honor"; Silfver, "silver"; and Gyllen, "golden"). The regular difference with Britain was that it became the new surname of the whole house, and the old surname was dropped altogether. To understand ennoblements better, we may think a noble as, using a Finnish example, Johan Jacob Schaeffer, Lord Ehrensvärd when ennobled, but they did not continue to use the old, thus he was, starting from the ennoblement, "Lord Johan Jacob Ehrensvärd".

These centuries, particularly the centralization of government in the 17th century, saw a gradual mass exodus of Finnish nobility, almost all families of high nobility and a good portion of more capable others, from Finland to the capital of Sweden and manors therearound.

On the other hand, branches of other noble families (from all around the Swedish realm) settled in Finland, mostly due to an office gained by the newcomer nobleman. These were generally of poorer families or branches, because most noblemen pursued towards positions in Stockholm, and the most resourceful generally did not fail.

As a result, when Russia conquered Finland, no particularly powerful class of nobility still inhabited it. They were generally just modestly propertied (or sometimes outright impoverished) families with traditions for serving in the military and/or administration at regular levels, and to create careers starting from junior positions. This was enormously helpful for Emperors to create a functioning administrative machinery, and to have a loyal country. There simply were no powerful magnates to foment feudal rebellion, or to disrupt the building of a bureaucratic state by their important privileges.

== Nobility in Russian eras ==
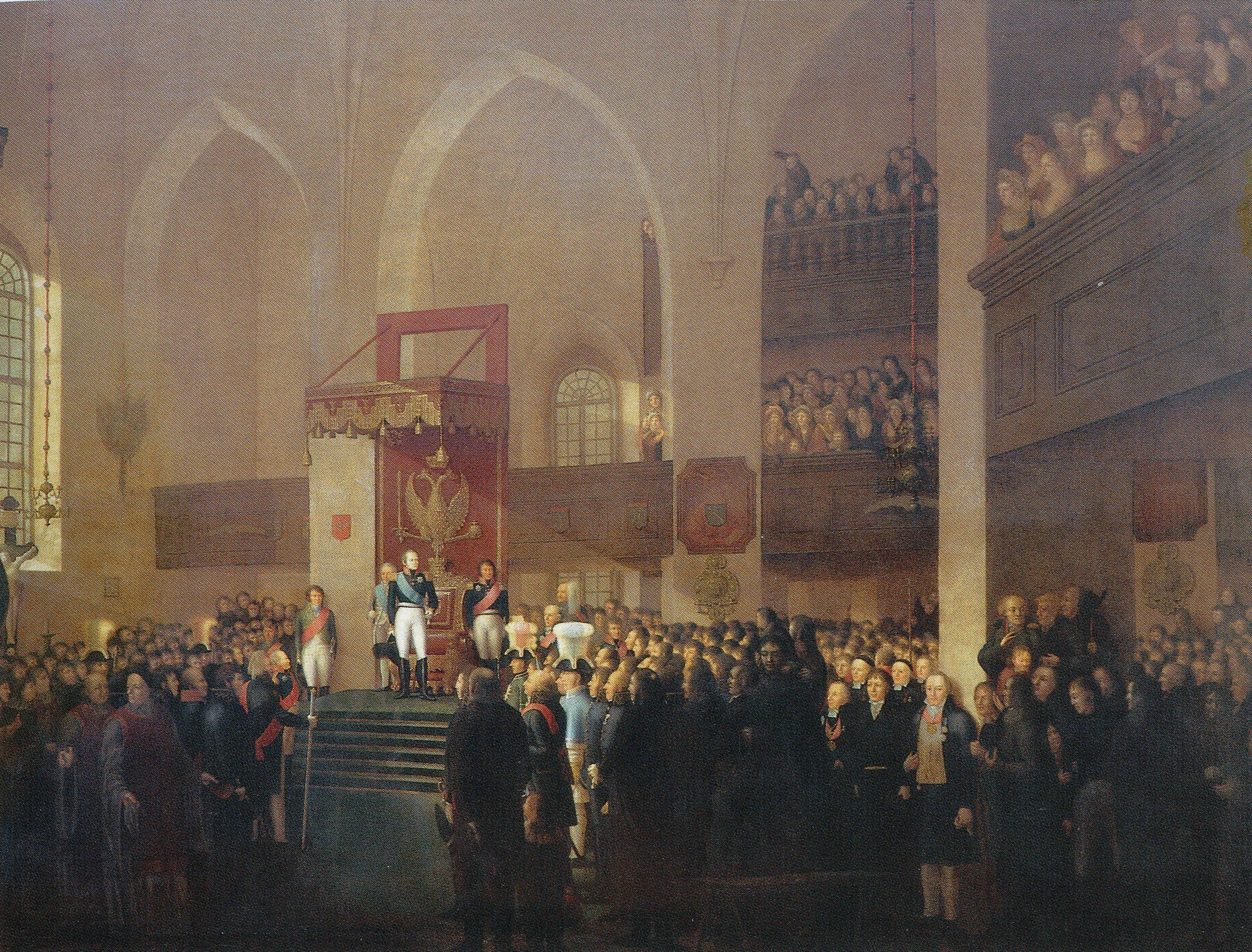
Finnish nobility at the Diet of Porvoo in 1809.

In 1721 the Russian empire had received eastern areas of County of Viborg and Nyslott and County of Kexholm by conquest. In 1744 these areas were consolidated with newly conquered part of County of Kymmenegård and Nyslott as Vyborg Governorate. This Old Finland had its main center in Vyborg and it was there that an institutionalized nobility system of Old Finland had its headquarters.

With the Peace Treaty of Fredrikshamn in autumn 1809, the Swedish king obliged to cede all of Finland to Russia and he freed Finnish nobles and people from their oaths of fealty. This opened the way to formal adoption of Finnish institutions, such as nobility, by the Russian emperor, as the new grand duke of Finland.

The entire country was the autonomous Grand Duchy of Finland under the Russian emperor between 1809 and 1917. The Vyborg house of nobility was amalgamated to the grand duchy's institution.

Finland established its own noble estate of the Finnish Diet, starting with the Diet in Porvoo 1809. The noble class was formally established as a House in 1818 and it raised a palace in 1862 to house its meetings, the Finnish House of Nobility. The inherited ranks continued in accordance with the Swedish model. The House of Nobility, the first estate, served as an official representation for the nobility, and as the highest one of the four estates of the diet. Heads of the noble houses were hereditary members of these assembly of nobles. But any nobleman fulfilling the representation criteria could represent his family if the head elected not to appear. Also a system of proxies existed, meaning that the head could empower any Finnish nobleman to represent the family. The proxies were in practice widely used.

The Emperors of Russia found Finnish nobility a nicely co-operative group of useful people in general, and entrusted much of the administration to locals. This was one of reasons why the autonomy of the country was so well established.

As early as the 18th century, during the Swedish rule, a class of mostly bureaucrats, outside of the division between the four estates, was generated.

Towards the late 19th century, restrictions over the "noble land" were lifted, as were marriage restrictions. Privileges were also decreased, or fell into disuse, or some of them became more or less meaningless. Along with other methods of taxation emerging, exemption from regular land tax became less significant. Capable and educated commoners were also recruited for careers as civil servants. The grand duchy never had a powerful nobility, nor was it able to fill all positions with noblemen.

A number of big landholdings were in the possession of certain noble families. Quite often, these were decreed as fideicommisses. Those nobles who possessed farmlands did not work in them, but usually maintained a manorial lifestyle: paid servants and farmhands, bigger or smaller, as well as villeins, crofters, rent farmers and tenants in lease, did the agricultural work, sometimes paying their rents by performing work, sometimes in products, and rarely in cash. Serfdom however never existed in Finland.

However, there were also impoverished noble families and poor members of the otherwise affluent nobility.

The main societal function of the nobility in those days was to provide military officers and civil servants for the grand ducal state. Competition for administrative, judicial and military positions ("offices") was the prevalent life of the Finnish nobility, and for the most part also their main source of income. New ennoblements were granted mostly on the basis of government career.

The families which have been introduced to the Finnish House of Nobility, the country's own estate of nobility, are listed on the House of Nobility website. Some families, representing Finnish officers ennobled for their military merits by the Grand Duchy of Finland, were not introduced, and are thus missing from that list.

== Privileges ==
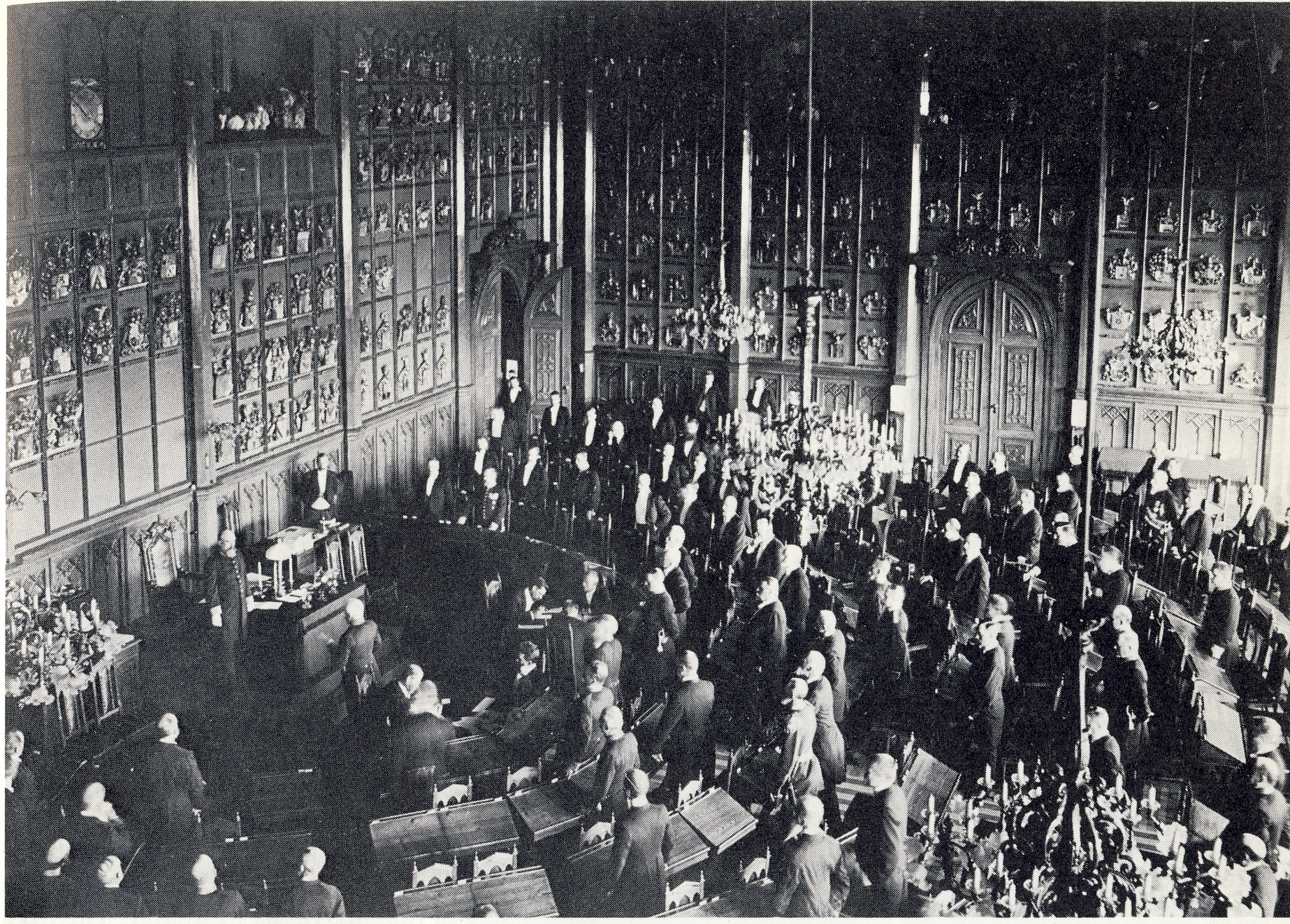
The last meeting of the Finnish noble estate in 1906 at the House of Nobility in Helsinki.

Up to the 19th century, there existed feudally-based privileges in landowning (farmland by its nature exempt from regular land taxation irrespective of who owned it), being connected to nobility-related lordships and to allodial land. Fiefs were common in late medieval and early modern eras.

The 1906 adoption of the unicameral legislature in the parliament removed the political status of the so-called First Estate of Finland, though noble ranks were possible to grant in Finland until 1917. The last untitled ennoblement was made in 1904, and the last baronial rank was given in 1912.

The noble estate was never abolished in Finland, and even the constitution of the republic (1919) decreed that remaining rights of the estate classes are existent, but its privileged position has been weakened step by step. The nobility's political privileges were practically abolished by the reformation of the Parliament in 1906. The last taxation privileges were abolished in 1920. Some minor privileges remained for longer.

It was, however, only in 1995 when the privileges – originating from 1723 – of all four estates were formally abolished in connection with a revision of the Finnish constitution. The privileges had, however, been long considered obsolete unenforceable legislation.

== Titles ==
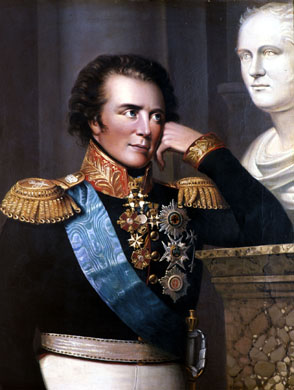
Count Gustaf Mauritz Armfelt.

The lowest, non-titled level of hereditary nobility was "adelsman" (i.e., "nobleman"). The untitled nobility was basically a rank without a fief. In practice, however, the majority of noble houses were fiefholders until the late 19th century.

Following the German example, all members of a noble family received equal noble status – not only the head of the house. If the family is of the rank of Prince, Count or Baron, all members receive that title as well. There are two families forming an exception to the aforesaid (Mannerheim, Aminoff) where all members are barons but only the head and his eldest son is a Count.

The female members of a noble family marrying within the estate bears the higher of titles which they were born to or married to, i.e. a baroness marrying a count becomes a countess, and a countess or baroness marrying an untitled nobleman remains countess or baroness.

In contrast to the United Kingdom and the Benelux countries, no hereditary titles or honours have been possible to grant since 1917. The last baron created was August Langhoff in 1912; he was Minister State Secretary of Finland.

Furste (Sw.) or Ruhtinas (Fi.) (crowned or sovereign prince) was granted in Finland by the Monarch of Finland to only one – Russian – prince family, that of prince Menschikoff (Alexander, Prince Menschikoff), a descendant of Alexander, Duke of Ingria on 1 July 1833. These Menschikoff thenceforward were premier "peers" of Finland.

Knighthood in knightly orders has generally not been counted as nobility in itself in the modern Finnish system. See also squire and esquire.

- Compare with Royal and noble ranks.

== Peerage and families ==
- Counties and baronies in Finland
- Duke of Finland
- Fief of Viborg
- List of Finnish noble families
- Finnish Royal Family

== Sources ==
- Pohjoinen suurvalta by Petri Karonen
- Finlands medeltida frälse och 1500-talsadel by Eric Anthoni 1970
- Finlands Riddarhus, by von Törne
- Aristokrat eller förädlad bonde? det svenska frälsets ekonomi, politik och sociala förbindelser under tiden 1523-1611 by Jan Samuelson 1993
- Vehkalahden knaapit by Eeva-Liisa Oksanen and Markku Oksanen, 2003.
- Sjöström (2011), "Medieval landed inheritances of the Junkar and Vilken lineages of Vehkalahti, Finland", Foundations: Journal of the Foundation for Medieval Genealogy, vol 3 issue 5 (2011 January), pp 425–461
- Sjöström (2011), "Y-DNA and medieval land inheritance of the Rolandh and Tepponen lineages of Vehkalahti, Finland", Foundations: Journal of the Foundation for Medieval Genealogy, vol 3 issue 6 (2011 July), pp 527–563
