= Hjärne =

Hjärne is a surname. Notable people with the surname include:

- Gustafva Sofia Hjärne (1780–1860), Finnish baroness and writer
- Harald Gabriel Hjärne (1848–1922), Swedish historian
- Urban Hjärne (1641–1724), Swedish scientist, physician and writer
