= Ridderstad =

Swedish family

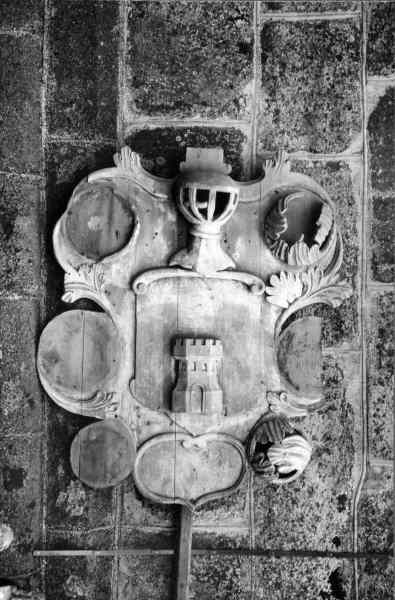
Coat of arms of the Ridderstad family

The Ridderstad family is a Swedish noble family originating in Estonia. The family seat was located at Riddersholm in Uppland, Sweden.

== Notable members ==
- Carl Fredrik Ridderstad, 1807–1886, Swedish liberal politician and newspaper man, in 1840 he became partner of Östgöta Correspondenten.
- Anton Ridderstad, 1848–1933, Swedish officer and historian, founded Captain Anton Ridderstads Foundation in 1932.
- Eskil Ridderstad, 1881–1962, Swedish newspaper man.
- Fred Ridderstad (born 1948), Swedish curler.
- Sture Ridderstad, 1911–1989, Swedish actor.
- Gunnar Ridderstad, born 1941, Swedish newspaper man.
