= Richard Bergenheim =

American magazine editor

Richard Bergenheim, CSB, (1948 – July 20, 2008) was the editor of The Christian Science Monitor and served The First Church of Christ, Scientist in numerous other capacities including on the church's Board of Directors and as President of The Mother Church.

== Biography ==
Bergenheim came from a publishing family. His father, Robert C. Bergenheim, founded the Boston Business Journal and was publisher of the Boston Herald American. His family were Christian Scientists, and his great-grandfather had attended the last class of Mary Baker Eddy, the founder of The First Church of Christ, Scientist, and his great-grandmother had worked for Eddy at her residence in Pleasant View.

Bergenheim graduated from Principia College in 1970, and received a Master’s degree from the Shakespeare Institute at the University of Birmingham in England. He then got a job teaching English at the Daycroft School, leaving after two years to become a Christian Science practitioner in 1974. In 1982, he became a Christian Science teacher. From 1988 to 1994, Bergenheim was a member of the Board of Directors of The Mother Church. He also served as Editor in Chief of the Christian Science Publishing Society for two years.

In May 2005, Bergenheim was named editor of The Christian Science Monitor. There was initially some skepticism as to the appointment because of his lack of journalism experience, but the skepticism was short lived according to the Monitor's David Cook, as it "gave way to affection and respect." Bergenheim was serving as editor during the kidnapping of correspondent Jill Carroll in Baghdad, Iraq by insurgents in January 2006. Bergenheim worked with FBI agents and other officials for Carroll's release. She was held for almost three months, and her Iraqi interpreter, Allan Enwiyah, was killed during her abduction. Carroll had been a freelancer at the time of her capture. Bergenheim immediately placed her on staff so she would be eligible for financial compensation for the kidnapping. When Carroll returned to the United States in April 2006, Bergenheim was one of the first to greet her with a hug at Logan Airport. Bergenheim was highly praised for his handling of the situation.

Also during Bergenheim tenure as editor of the Monitor, he championed the development of the paper's web presence and helped support the installation of new technology in the newsroom. June 2008, he left his position as Monitor editor to become President of The Mother Church. However, he died before the end of his term.

== Selected works ==
- Bergenheim, Richard C. (1 May 1996). "An Unambiguous Christianity". The Christian Science Journal. 114 (5): 5–8.
