= Törnqvist =

Törnqvist is a Swedish surname.

Notable people include:

- Egil Törnqvist
- Gusten Törnqvist, Swedish retired professional ice hockey goaltender
- Jane Törnqvist, Philippine-born Swedish former footballer
- Leo Törnqvist (1911–1983), Finnish statistician
- Nils Törnqvist
- Noel Törnqvist
- Rebecka Törnqvist, Swedish jazz and pop vocalist
- Torbjörn Törnqvist, Swedish billionaire
