= Orn (name) =

Orn and Örn is an Icelandic name.

It may refer to:

== People with the given name ==
- Örn Arnarson (born 1981), Icelandic swimmer
- Örn Árnason (born 1959), Icelandic actor, comedian and screenwriter
- Örn Clausen (1928–2008), Icelandic decathlete

== People with the surname ==
- Adam Örn Arnarson (born 1995), Icelandic football defender
- Ásgeir Örn Hallgrímsson (born 1984), Icelandic handball player
- Birgir Örn Birgisson (born 1969), Icelandic basketball player and coach
- Einar Örn Benediktsson (born 1962), Icelandic singer, trumpet player and politician
- Einar Örn Jónsson (born 1976), Icelandic handball player
- Eiríkur Örn Norðdahl (born 1978), Icelandic writer
- Gunnar Örn Jónsson (born 1985), Icelandic football player
- Gunnar Örn Tynes (born 1979), Icelandic musician
- Hilmar Örn Hilmarsson (born 1958), Icelandic musician and art director
- Hólmar Örn Eyjólfsson (born 1990), Icelandic football player
- Hólmar Örn Rúnarsson (born 1981), Icelandic football player
- Jón Örn Loðmfjörð (born 1983), Icelandic poet
- Kristján Örn Sigurðsson (born 1980), Icelandic football player
- Markús Örn Antonsson (born 1943), Mayor of Reykjavík
- Ólafur Örn Bjarnason (born 1975), Icelandic football player
- Óskar Örn Hauksson (born 1984), Icelandic football player
- Mikael Örn (born 1961), Swedish swimmer
- Rolf Örn (1893–1979), Swedish equestrian
- Stefan Örn (born 1975), Swedish music composer and guitarist
- Viðar Örn Kjartansson (born 1990), Icelandic football player
