= Selim Ekbom =

Finnish politician

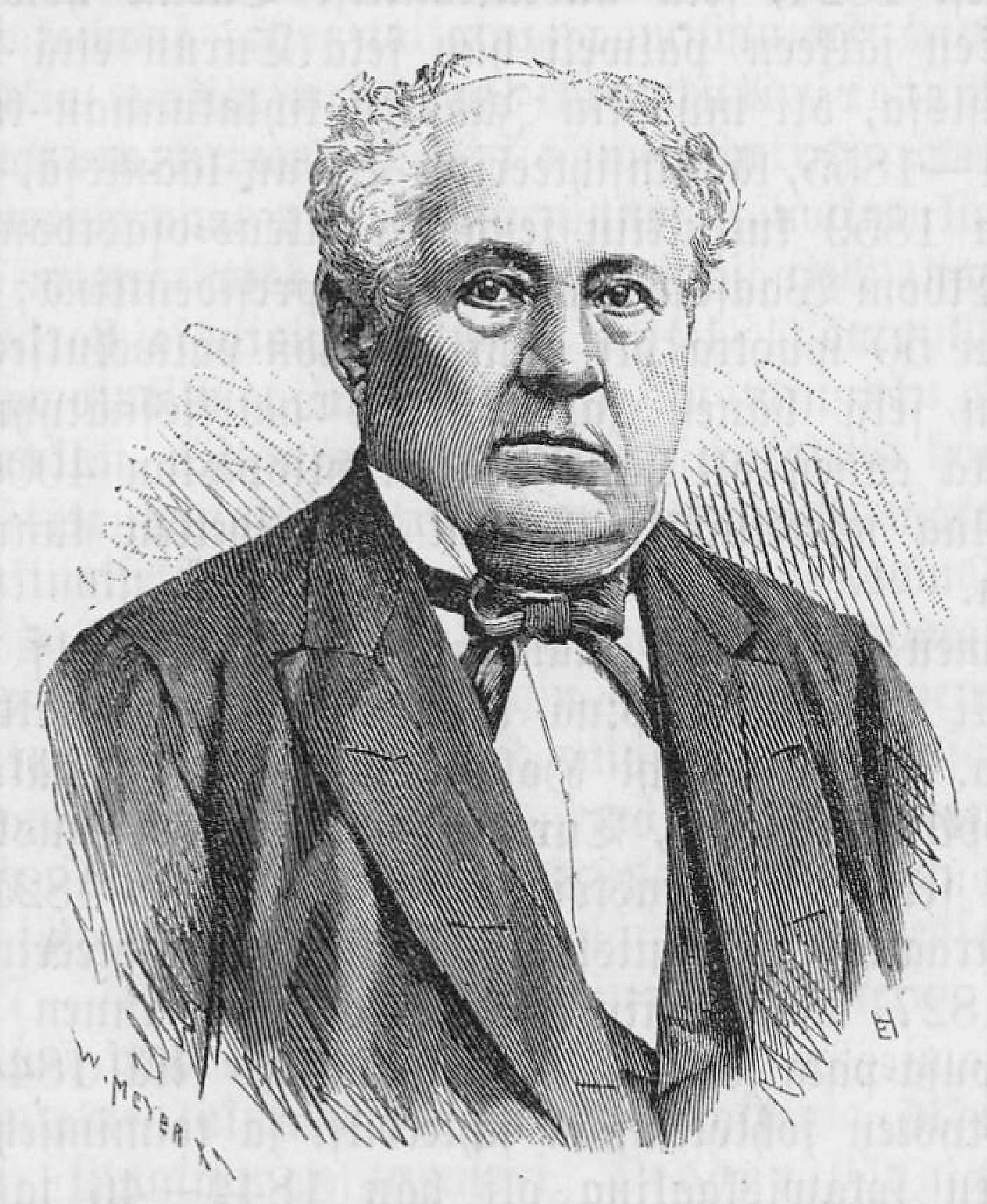

Selim Ekbom (9 April 1807 in Turku – 20 April 1886 in Vaasa) was a Finnish politician. He was a member of the Senate of Finland.
