= Nils Gyldenstolpe =

Nils Gyldenstolpe may refer to:

- Nils Gyldenstolpe (1642–1709), privy council president
- Nils Philip Gyldenstolpe (1734–1810), count
- Nils Carl Gustaf Fersen Gyldenstolpe (1886–1961), ornithologist
