= Molander =

Molander is a surname of Scandinavian origin. Notable people with the surname include:

- Greta Molander (1908–2002), Swedish/Norwegian rally driver and writer
- Gustaf Molander (1888–1973), Swedish actor and film director
- Harald Molander (1909–1994), Swedish film producer
- Helga Molander (1896–1986), German theatre and film actress
- Jan Molander (1920–2009), Swedish actor and film / TV director
- Karin Molander (1889–1978), Swedish stage and film actress
- Nils Molander (1889–1974), Swedish ice hockey player and Olympic competitor
- Olof Molander (1892–1966), Swedish theatre and film director
- Roger Molander (1940–2012), American government official and activist
- Scooter Molander (born 1966), American football player
- Lloyd Bryan Molander Adams (born 1961), American producer and director

== See also ==
- Der Fall Molander, a 1945 German dramatic film directed by Georg Wilhelm Pabst
