= Alexander Gadolin =

Finnish legal scholar and politician

Alexander Wilhelm Gadolin (8 July 1868 – 2 June 1939) was a Finnish legal scholar and politician. He was a member of the Diet of Finland in 1894 and from 1899 to 1906 and of the Parliament of Finland from 1913 to 1916, representing the Swedish People's Party of Finland (SFP). Alexander was born in Borgå landskommun (Porvoon maalaiskunta), Finland, and died on 2 June 1939 in Åbo (Turku), Finland.
