= House of Nobility (Finland) =

Finnish nobility, or the noble palace in Helsinki

Coordinates: 60°10′11″N 24°57′23″E

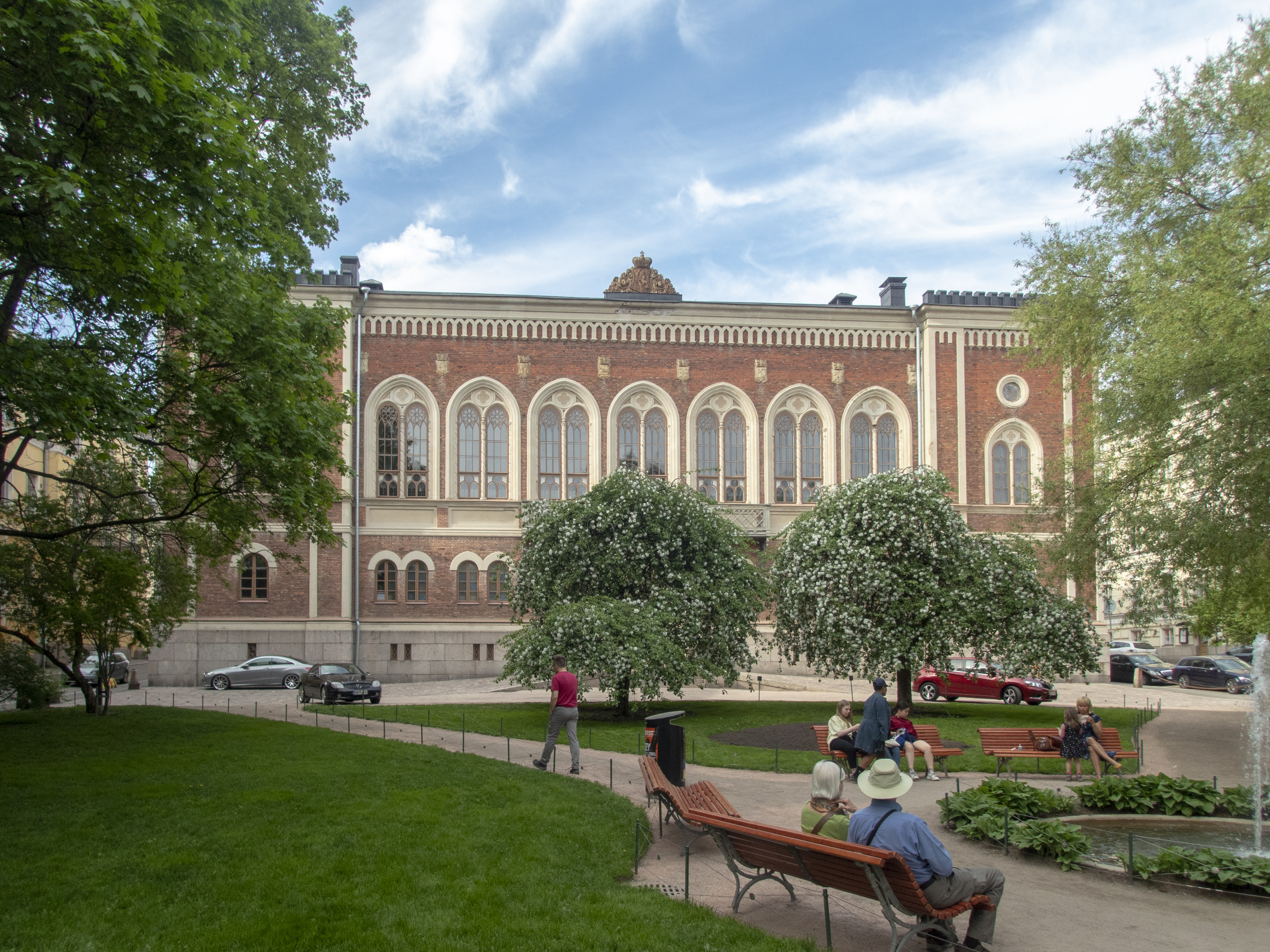
House of Nobility in Helsinki, Finland.

The House of Nobility either refers to the institution of the Finnish nobility or the palace of the noble estate in Helsinki, Finland. The Finnish nobility was from 1809 until 1906 the first of the four estates of the realm.

== The Estate ==
The estate of nobility existed fully starting from the 1809 Diet of Porvoo when the Grand Duchy of Finland was formally created. The Finnish nobility was formally organized in 1818.

Families of Finnish nobility were registered in the rolls of the Finnish House of Nobility, through a process called introduction to one's peers, after the imperial creation.

First introductions in 1818 were registrations of those noble families registered in the Swedish House of Nobility whose male members lived in Finland and had sworn fealty to the emperor.

During the Grand Duchy of Finland period, a number of de novo creations and naturalizations were made by the Russian emperors. The first estate of the four estates of the realm of Finland existed until 1906 when a single chamber parliament was introduced. Baron August Langhoff was the last to be ennobled, in 1912. Hence, Finnish nobility today is a closed society. Today the House of Nobility is a hereditary association of members of registered nobility.

The families introduced to the Finnish House of Nobility together with a brief description of the origins of the family and the coats of arms are listed on the House of Nobility website.

== The Ritarihuone / Riddarhuset building ==
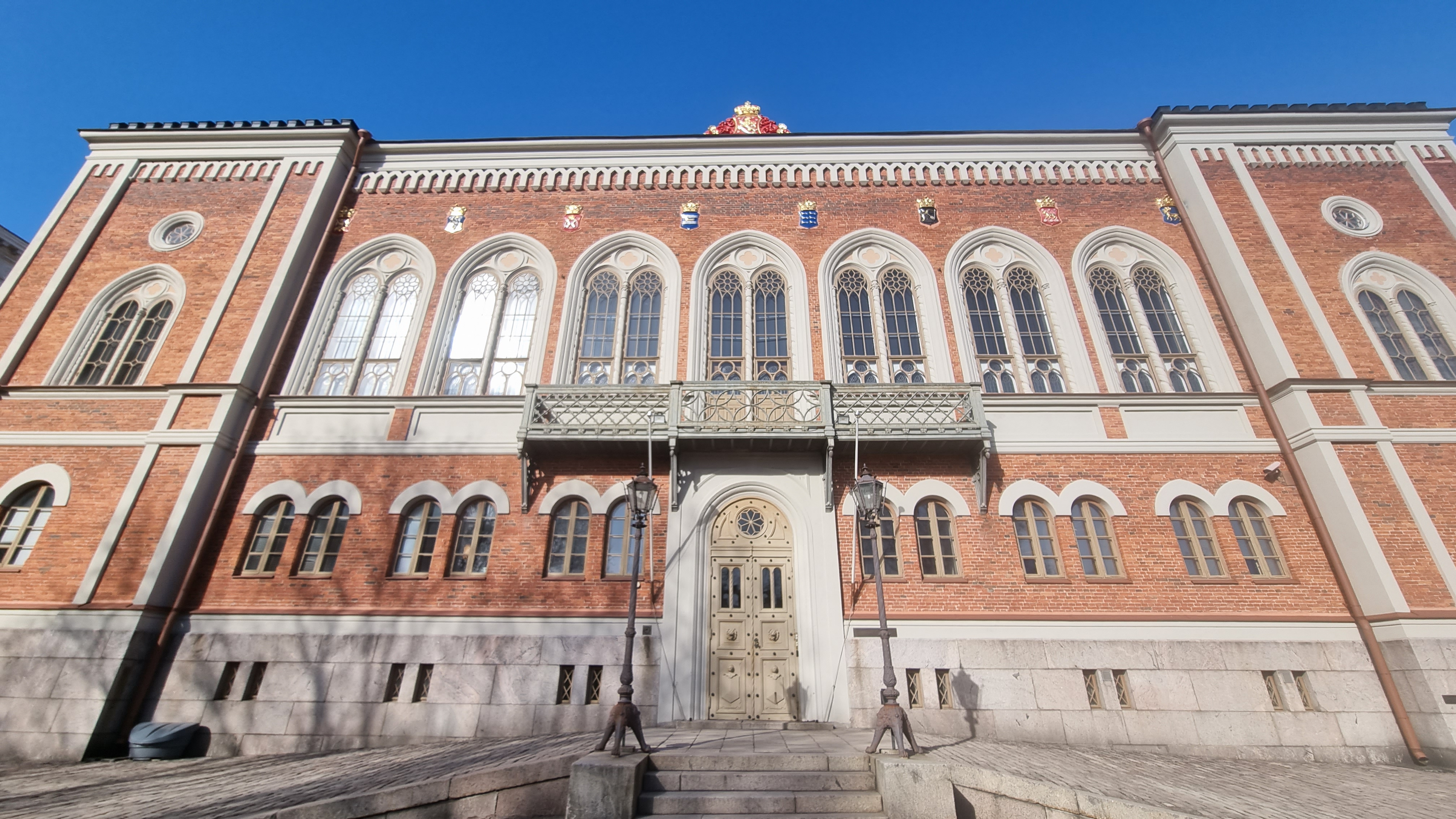
The Ritarihuone building.

The Finnish House of Nobility as corporation owns, since 1857, the assembly building completed in 1862.

The building, called Ritarihuone in Finnish and Riddarhuset in Swedish, (House of Knights) is of Neogothic style by G.T. Chiewitz. The building is located in Kruununhaka, downtown Helsinki. The block and its land is owned collectively by the Finnish nobility. There are the offices of the House, for example its General Secretary, the Chancellery, and the Genealogist as well as a library, archives and heraldic collections.

== Lord Marshals ==
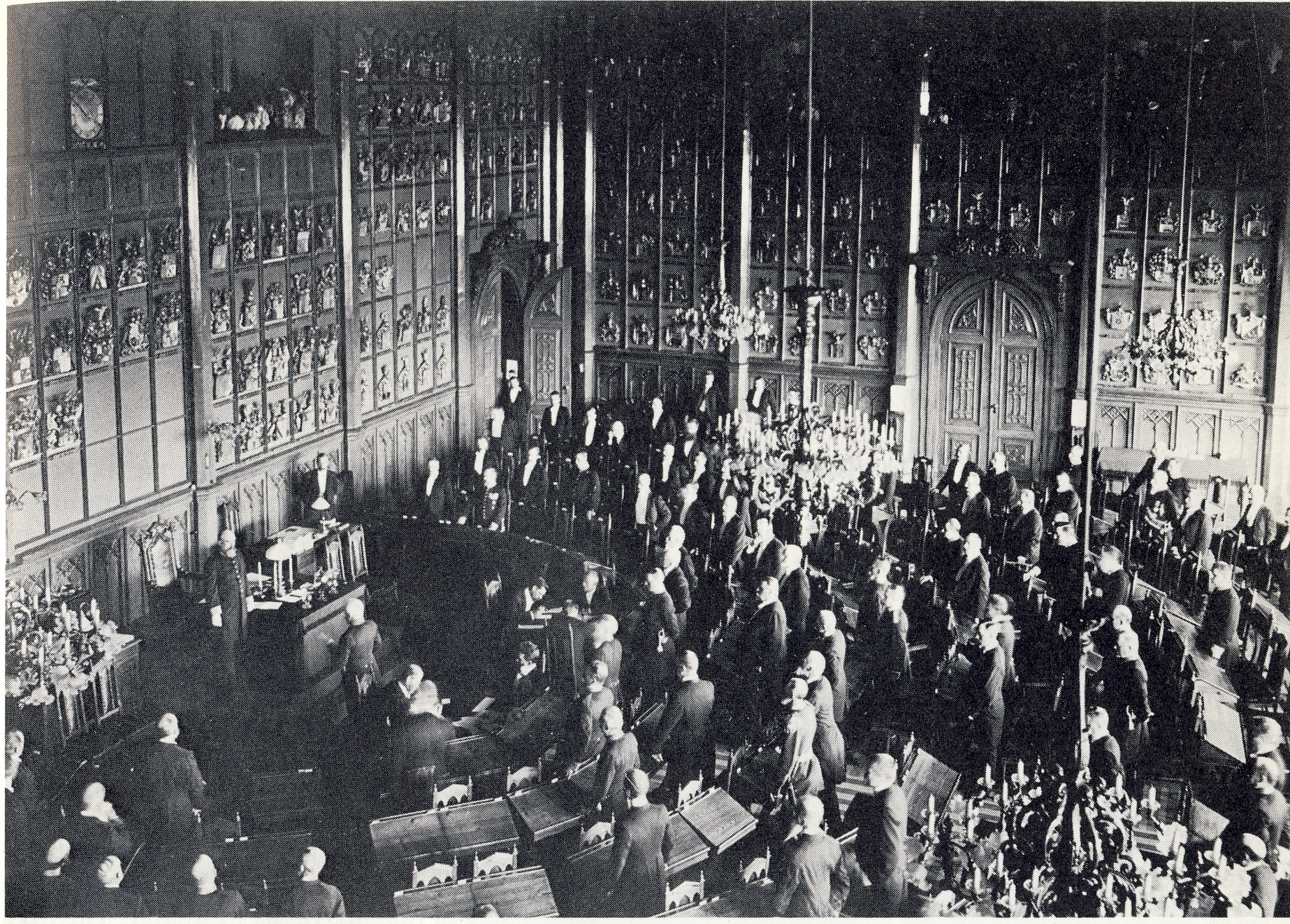
The last meeting of Finnish noble estate in Ritarihuone.

Traditionally, the Lord Marshal was the chairman of sessions of the noble class (House of Nobility) as well as the overall speaker of the Diet. The persons who held the office of Lord Marshal in various diet sessions, are listed below:

- 1809 count Robert Wilhelm De Geer
- 1863–1864 Lieutenant General Johan Mauritz Nordenstam
- 1867 Johan Mauritz Nordenstam
- 1872 Johan Mauritz Nordenstam
- 1877–1878 Johan von Born
- 1882 baron Samuel Verner von Troil
- 1885 baron Samuel Verner von Troil
- 1888 Gabriel von Haartman
- 1891 Gabriel von Haartman
- 1894 Lars von Hellens
- 1897 baron Samuel Verner von Troil
- 1899 (extraordinary diet) baron Samuel Verner von Troil
- 1900 Counselor of State professor Lorentz Lindelöf
- 1904–1905 Constantin Linder (1904), Ossian Wuorenheimo (1905)
- 1905–1906 (extraordinary diet) Viktor Magnus von Born

== See also ==
- List of Finnish noble families
