= Clas Frietzcky =

Swedish politician

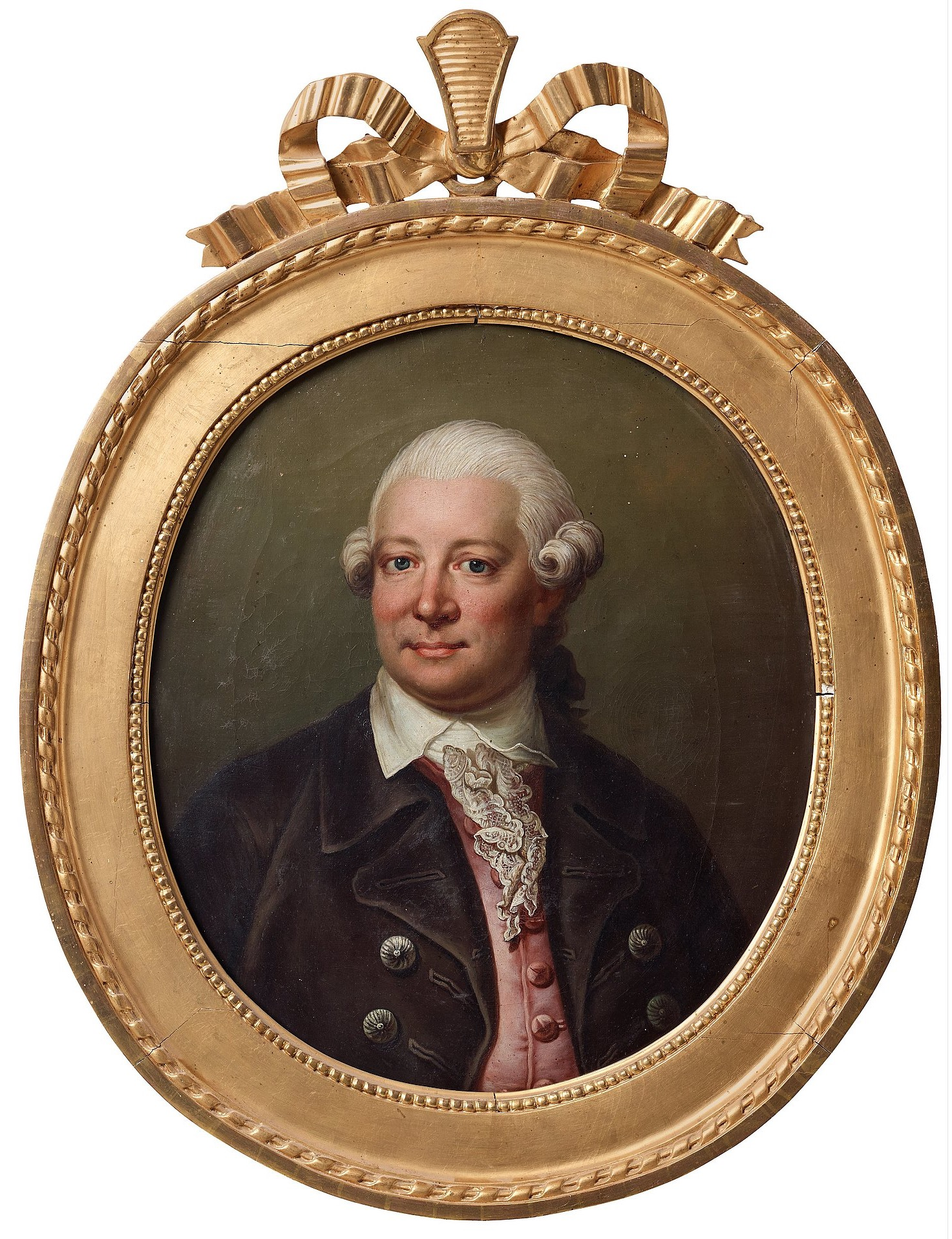
- Born: 25 January 1727; Bjurtjärn socken, Sweden (now Storfors Municipality, Sweden)
- Died: 9 October 1803 (aged 76); Säbylund Manor, Sweden
- Occupation: Politician

Claes de Frietzcky (25 January 1727 – 9 October 1803) was a Swedish politician.

== Life and work ==
Claes de Frietzcky was born at Alkvettern Ironworks, in Bjurtjärn, to the noble family de Frietzcky. He was the eight and youngest son of Johan de Frietzcky and Anna Elisabeth Linroth. In 1754 he became manager of the Storfors factory located outside Filipstad. He was a skilled business owner but left this profession to engage in politics. He became one of the leading people of the Caps party and during the transformations of the Swedish state in 1772, he joined the aristocratic opposition, which defended the rights of the Swedish Parliament towards the king. He became the main opponent to Gustav III in the issue of alcohol.
