= Carl August Adlersparre =

Swedish courtier, poet, and writer (1810–1862)

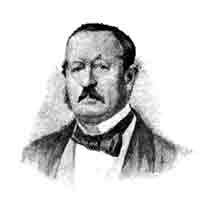
Carl August Adlersparre

Carl August Adlersparre (7 June 1810 – 5 May 1862) was a Swedish count (1835), chamberlain (1838), poet, novelist and historian from the Adlersparre family. He was known under his pen name Albano.

== Life ==
Carl August Adlersparre was born in Kristinehamn, Värmland; the oldest son of Georg Adlersparre (1760–1835) and Lovisa Magdalena Linroth (1784–1866). As a student he pursue the military career and in 1841 became lieutenant in the Värmland field Hunters Regiment, but took leave in 1845. In 1848 he married Charlotte Aurore Jeanette von Platen (1821–1853) who bore him a daughter, Louise Henrietta Adlersparre (1850–1875). He died in Stockholm, aged almost 52.

== Work ==
He wrote poem and novels in the romantic style but without deep motivation. For these efforts he was awarded five minor Swedish academic prices (1834–43). Here is a selection of his poems:

- (in Swedish) Ungdoms-dikter (Youth Poems), Förf., Stockholm, 1830
- (in Swedish) Hugo: en romantisk dikt (Hugo, a romantic poem), Carlstad, 1840
- (in Swedish) Smärre samlade dikter (Minor collected poems), Carlstad, 1841

In prose he wrote, among others:

- (in Swedish) Skizzer och reseminnen (Sketches and Travel Memories), 1844
- (in Swedish) Smärre skizzer (Minor Sketches) in 2 volumes, Albert Bonniers, Stockholm, 1849-50

He is mostly remembered for his historical biographies:

- (in Swedish) 1809 års revolution och dess män (The 1809 revolution and its men), 2 vol., Stockholm, 1849, Albert Bonniers Föorlag
- (in Swedish) 1809 Och 1810: Tidstaflor, 3 vol., Stockholm, 1850, Albert Bonniers Föorlag
- (in Swedish) Anteckningar om bortgångne samtida, 3 vol., Stockholm 1860–1862, Albert Bonniers

== See also ==
- Stockholms Figaro
