= Hans von Kantzow =

Former Swedish Engineer and CEO (1887–1979)

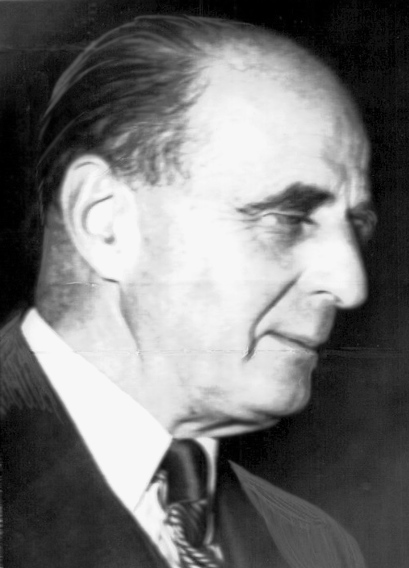
- Kantzow in 1951
- Born: 9 June 1887; Alkvettern Manor, Bjurtjärn socken, Sweden–Norway (now Storfors Municipality, Sweden)
- Died: 12 April 1979 (aged 91); Hallstahammar, Sweden
- Education: Royal Institute of Technology
- Occupation: Engineer
- Employer: AB Kanthal

Hans von Kantzow (9 June 1887 – 12 April 1979) was a metallurgical engineer and industrialist, managing director and CEO at Bultfabriks AB in Hallstahammar 1918–1957. Von Kantzow is known to have invented the steel alloy Kanthal. In 1931 AB Kanthal was founded for the exploitation of the invention.
