= Bjurtjärn socken =

Former socken in Värmland, Sweden

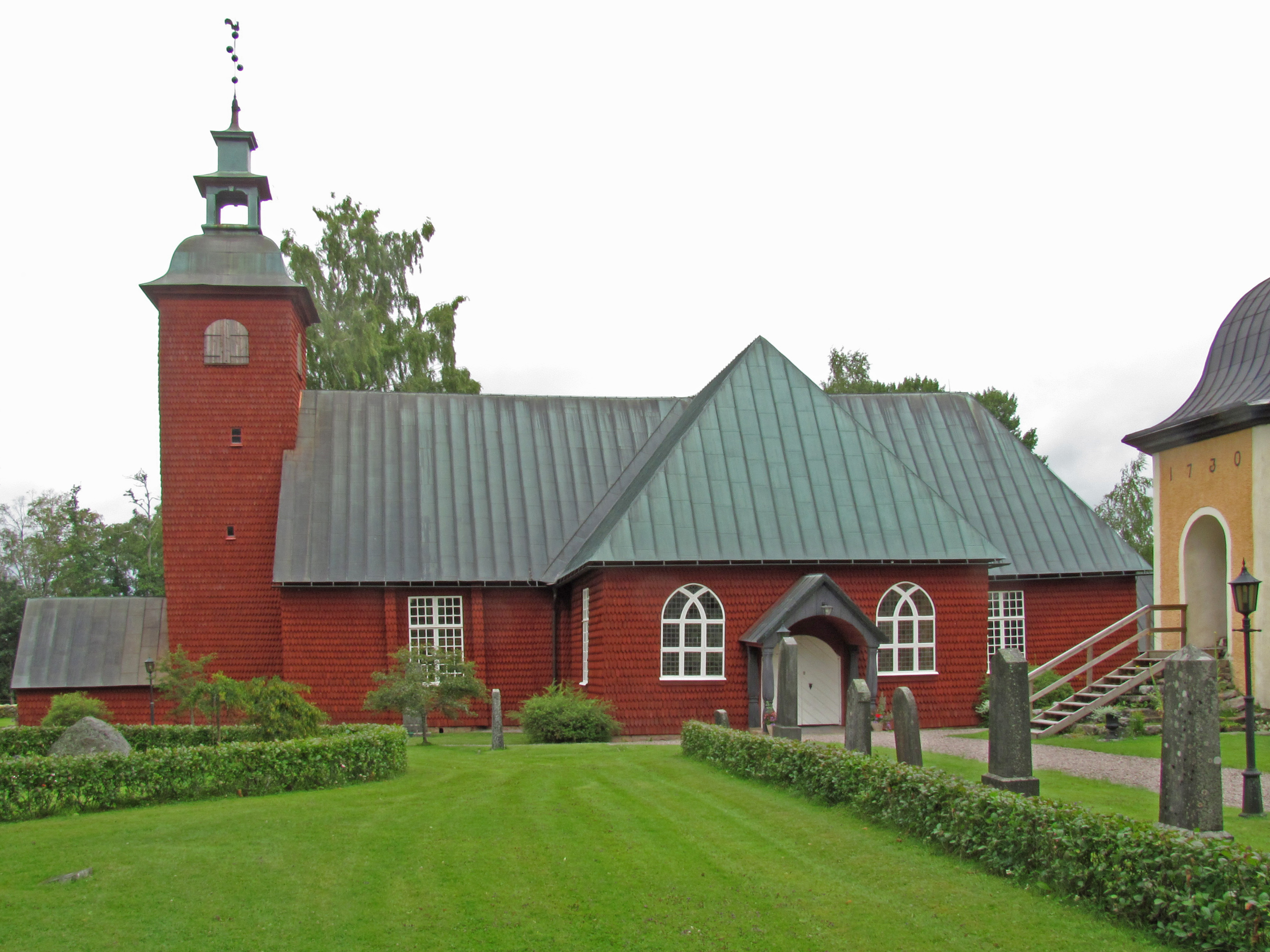
Bjurtjärn Church

Bjurtjärn socken is a former socken in Värmland, Sweden. It was established in 1630, when Karlskoga socken were split into two new entities.

Since 1974, it has been part of the Storfors Municipality.

Its largest settlement, Kyrksten, has a population of about 300.

== History ==
The Bjurtjärn Church was built in the 17th century. Various items that is kept at this site were donated by the influential Linroth family.

In 1854, more than 200 emigrants from Bjurtjärn settled in Pepin County, in the US state of Wisconsin.

== Archeology ==
The socken has various graves from the Iron Age.

== Notable people ==
- Clas Frietzcky, politician
- Hans von Kantzow, inventor and engineer

== Sites of interest in Bjurtjärn socken ==
- Alkvettern Manor

== See also ==
- Kerang
- Stockholm (town), Wisconsin
