= Georg Adlersparre =

Swedish army officer, politician, and writer (1760–1835)

Count Georg Adlersparre
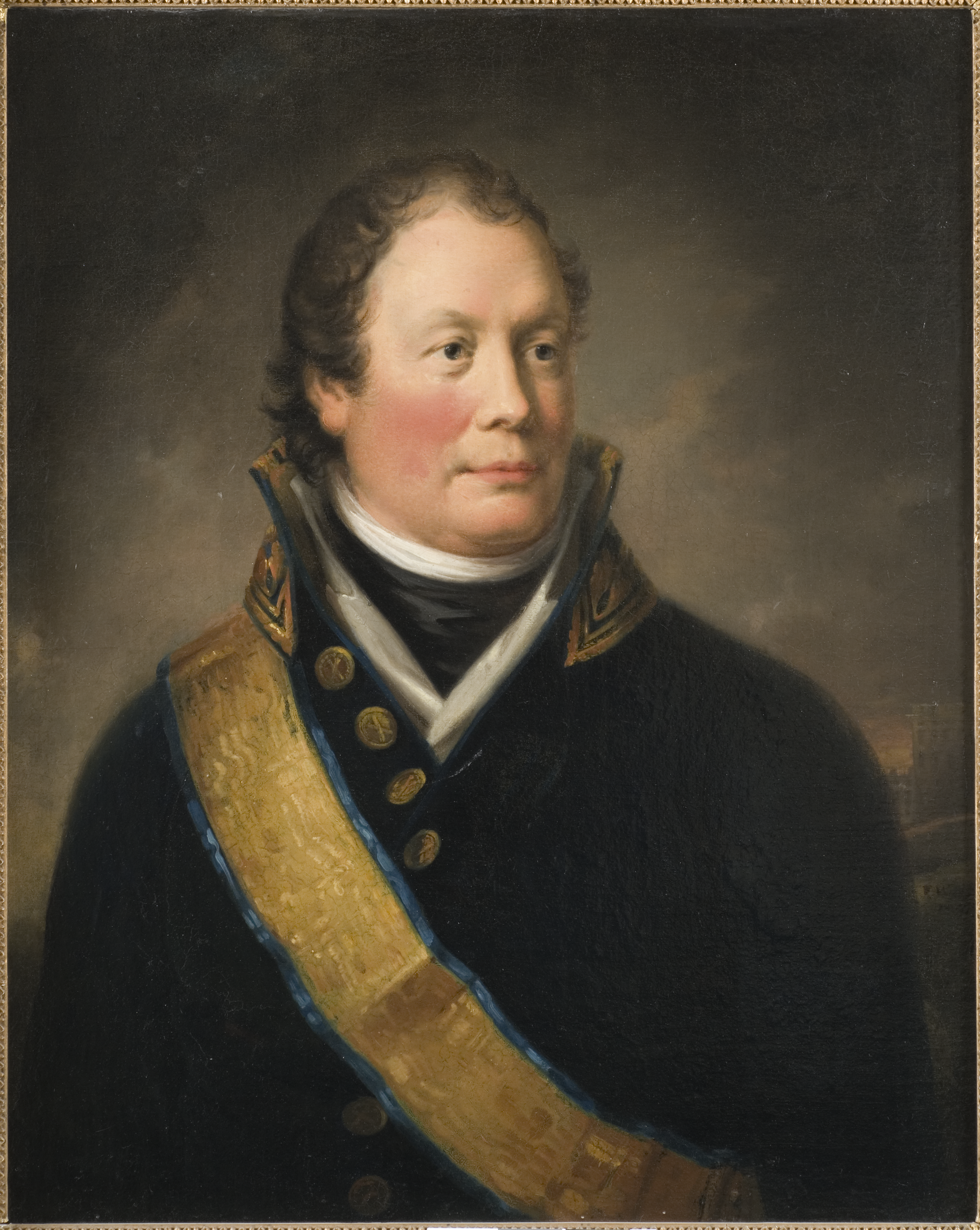
- Born: 28 March 1760; Hovermo (now part of Berg Municipality, Jämtland County)
- Died: 23 September 1835 (aged 75); Kristinehamn Municipality, Värmland
- Military career
- Allegiance: Sweden
- Rank: Major General
- Conflicts: Russo-Swedish War
- Other work: County governor of Skaraborg County, 1810–1824

Count Georg Adlersparre (28 March 1760 – 23 September 1835) was a Swedish army commander, politician and writer from the Adlersparre family. He was the leader of the Coup of 1809, leading to the deposition of King Gustav IV Adolf of Sweden. Adlersparre translated large parts of The Wealth of Nations into Swedish through his periodical Läsning i blandade ämnen.

== Biography ==
Adlersparre was born in Hovermo (now a part of Berg Municipality, Jämtland County). Having entered the army at the age of 15, he received from King Gustav III, in 1791, a secret commission to excite the Norwegians to rebellion. After the death of the king, he left the army and devoted himself to writing and politics. In 1797–1801, he published the periodical Läsning i blandade ämnen. The liberal spirit in which he conducted it brought upon him the suspicions of the government.

In 1802, he was elected a member of the Royal Swedish Academy of Sciences.

In 1808 he once again joined the military and received the command of a part of the so-called western army. Shortly thereafter he was promoted to therank of lieutenant-colonel.

He was the leader of a conspiracy of officers and noblemen, among them Carl Johan Adlercreutz, against Gustav IV Adolf and triggered the Coup of 1809 by marching with his army to Stockholm.

He was governor of Skaraborg County from 1810 until 1824 when he resigned.

After the coup he supported the new strong monarchy, notwithstanding the liberality of his sentiments. In 1831 he was involved in a controversy for publishing allegedly secret state documents and his private correspondence with various Swedish princes, actions for which he remained unrepentant. He spent the last 25 years of his life residing in Gustafsvik Manor in Kristinehamn Municipality, Värmland, where he died in 1835.

== Family ==
In 1809 he married Lovisa Magdalena Linroth (20 April 1784 – 8 November 1866 Kristinehamn Municipality, Värmland). They had four children:

- Carl August Adlersparre (1810–1862), distinguished himself as a poet and an historian.
- Lovisa Maria Adlersparre (1814–1837)
- Georg Axel Adlersparre (1816–1889)
- Rudolf Adlersparre (1819–1908)
