= Bjurtjärn Church =

Coordinates: 59.4444°N 14.3265°E

- Bjurtjärns kyrka
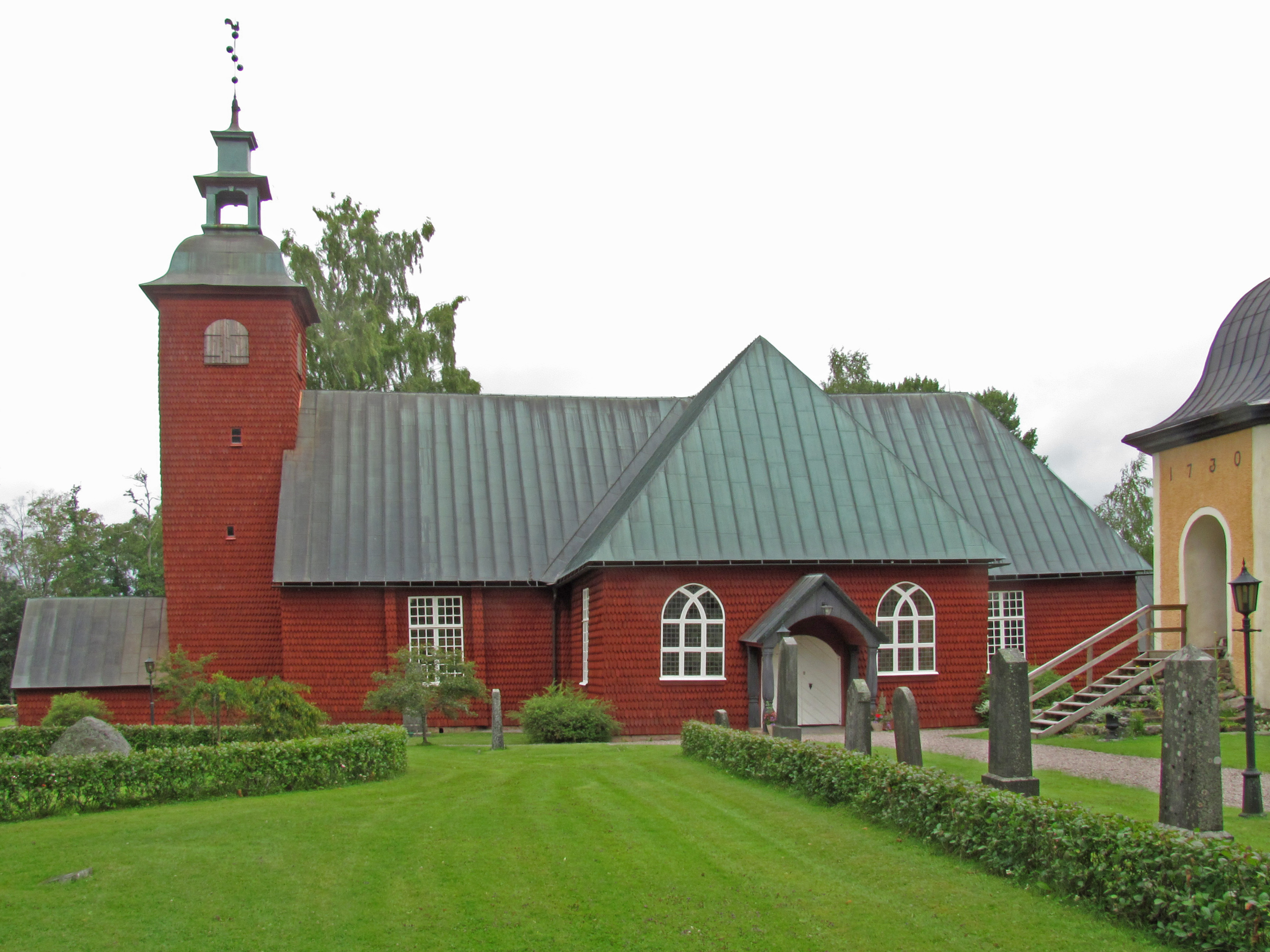
- The Bjurtjärn Church in 2011
- Bjurtjärn Church
- Location: Bjurtjärn socken, Storfors Municipality
- Country: Sweden
- Denomination: Church of Sweden

History
- Consecrated: c. 1650s

Administration
- Diocese: Diocese of Karlstad

The Bjurtjärn Church (Swedish: Bjurtjärns kyrka) is a church building in Bjurtjärn, Storfors Municipality, Sweden. Belonging to the Church of Sweden, the church was inaugurated in 1643. The church resembles the look of the Karlskoga Church, with its red-painted walls, and wooden paneling.

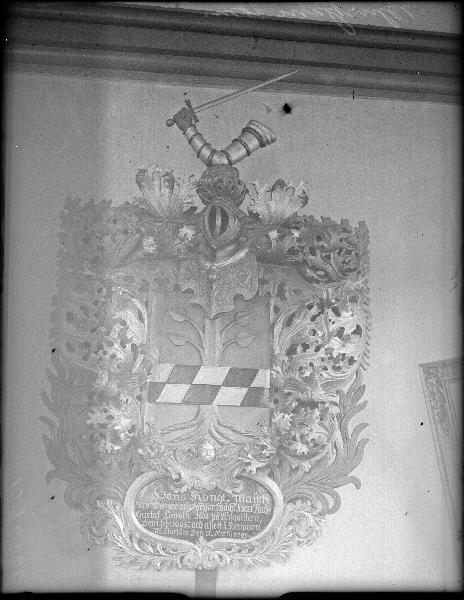
The Linroth family coat of arms at the Bjurtjärn Church.

The church building was expanded in 1671.

The Linroth family donated various items to the church, including an altarpiece.
