= Kyrksten =

- Urban settlement
- Location within Sweden
- Coordinates: 59°26′17″N 14°23′31″E
- Country: Sweden
- Province: Värmland
- County: Värmland County
- Municipality: Storfors Municipality

Area
  - Total: 0.30 km^{2} (0.12 sq mi)

Population (31 December 2010)
  - Total: 258
  - Density: 847/km^{2} (2,190/sq mi)
- Time zone: UTC+1 (CET)
  - Summer (DST): UTC+2 (CEST)

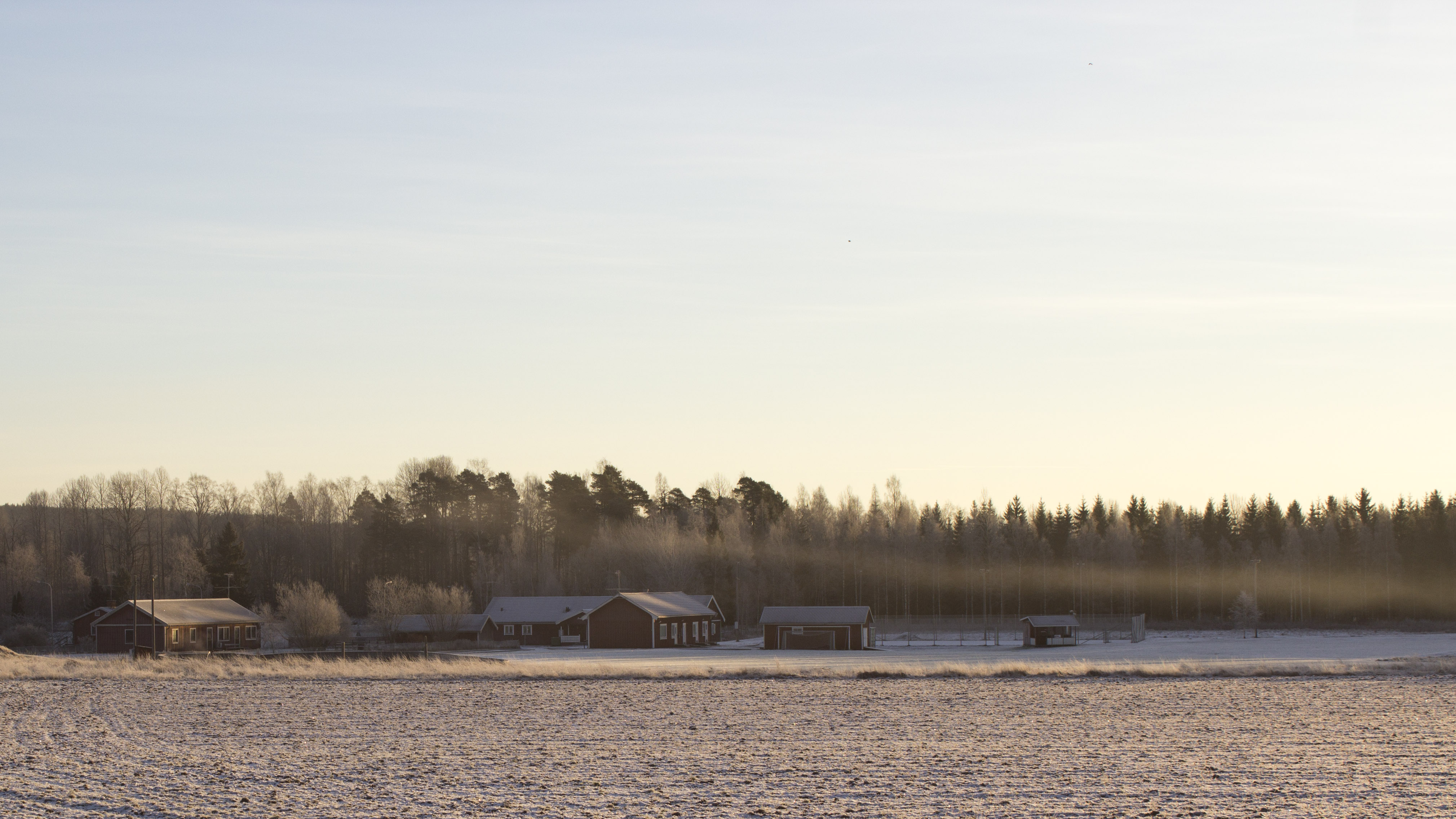

Kyrksten is a locality situated in Storfors Municipality, Värmland County, Sweden with 263 inhabitants in 2020. The settlement is located south of Alkvettern Manor, southeast of the municipal seat Storfors and 13 km (8 mi) northwest of Karlskoga.

Historical population
Year	Pop.	±%
1990	346	—
1995	325	−6.1%
2000	295	−9.2%
2005	280	−5.1%
2010	258	−7.9%
2015	237	−8.1%
2020	263	+11.0%
