= Wilhelmina Enbom =

Swedish operatic soprano (1804–1880)

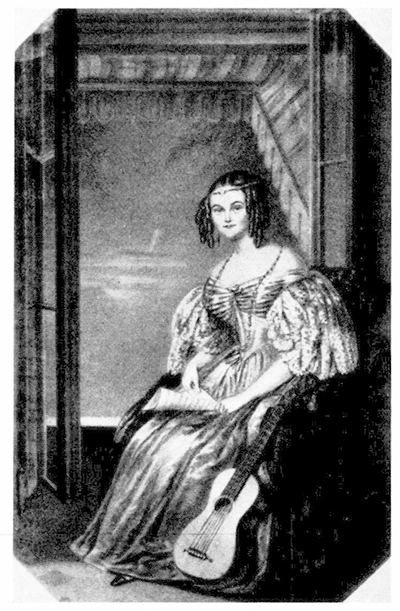
Wilhelmina Enbom by Maria Röhl, 1830s

Christina Wilhelmina Enbom (19 August 1804 – 14 February 1880) was a Swedish operatic soprano. She was active at the Royal Swedish Opera in Stockholm in 1819–26, in 1830–41 and 1850–57. She was one of the most notable opera singers in Sweden during the 1830s.

== Life ==
Christina Wilhelmina Enbom was born to Johan Enbohm and Christina Catharina Norrmann in Stockholm.

=== Operatic career ===
Enbom was enrolled as a student singer of the Royal Swedish Opera (RSO) in 1819. She became a member of the opera chorus there in 1821, made her formal debut in 1823 and progressed to a soloist in 1824. On 1 July 1826, she abruptly resigned to marry sea captain, writer, and impresario Anders Lindeberg, who was then an influential person in Swedish culture life. Her sudden early retirement was seen as surprising because of her successful debut.

In 1830, she divorced her husband, officially because of indifference but according to the registers because of adultery on her part, which was illustrated by the fact that her husband was granted custody of their children. After her divorce, she took the name and title of Mrs Enbom. On 1 October 1830, she was given a contract at the Royal Opera. During the 1830s, she was a popular singer at the Royal Opera with many assignments, and successful both as an alto and a soprano in roles such as the Queen of the Night in Wolfgang Amadeus Mozart's The Magic Flute, Donna Anna as well as Elvira in Don Juan by Mozart, and Almaviva in The Marriage of Figaro. Among her most noted parts where the alto Breeches role Malcolm in La Donna del Lago and the title role of Tancredi, both by Gioacchino Rossini and the later of which was staged at the Royal Opera specifically so that she could perform in it (1832).

Enbom was described as an artist capable of creating illusion by complying force in both voice and acting, but in lack of the training which could have developed what was a great natural ability:

"Her voice with its metallic sound was strong and with great range. It reached almost over tree octaves but was most beautiful as an alto. With her resources :she could have gone far with schooling. She was never given such a thing but she was given a number of main soprano- and alto parts during the 1830s".

Her lack of training often exposed her to criticism of being uneven in her performances.

After the breakthrough of Jenny Lind in 1838, the contrast between a trained and an untrained voice heavily damaged the career and position of Enbom at the Royal Opera. Additionally, she caused a couple of scandals because of her temperament. During a performance of Mozart's The Marriage of Figaro in the 1838–39 season, where she played Countess Almaviva opposite Henriette Widerberg as Susanna, Widerberg entered the stage too soon, which caused Enbom to lose the applause for her aria. Enraged, Enbom spoke her line harshly instead of friendly when she said: "Bring my chair!", upon which Widerberg answered: "Do it yourself, you -" after which their lines, as was reported, "was given a few extra words, which caused both merriness as well as annoyance". Her voice, damaged because it had not been managed properly, also deteriorated during these years of rivalry with Jenny Lind, in which she was supported by her former husband, described as her greatest admirer, but when she was discharged from the Royal Opera in 1841, Orvar Odd remarked that only her former husband still praised "the former Mrs Lindeberg's former voice." Orvar Odd in the publication "Grupper och personager" (1861) wrote of her:

"Mrs Enbom was with no doubt, and had with even lesser doubt been, a useful singer: she filled her part, whatever she :was given, but she did so with no particular grace, and she performed it less than she hammered through it. Her performance had always something of a drummer :about it and when she hammered her way through a scene, one was always somewhat worried that she would drop one of her drummer pins on the floor".

=== Later life ===
After having discontinued her operatic career, Enbom was active as an actress. In 1843–50, she was active at the Mindre teatern, which was at that time owned by her ex-husband, and in the theater company of Charlotta Djurström. In 1850–56, she was again active at the RSO, but only as a member of chorus. She lived under strained financial circumstances, being supported by her son and a small pension as well as an occasional theater performance to her benefit. She died in Stockholm.
