= Stockholm, Wisconsin =

- Village
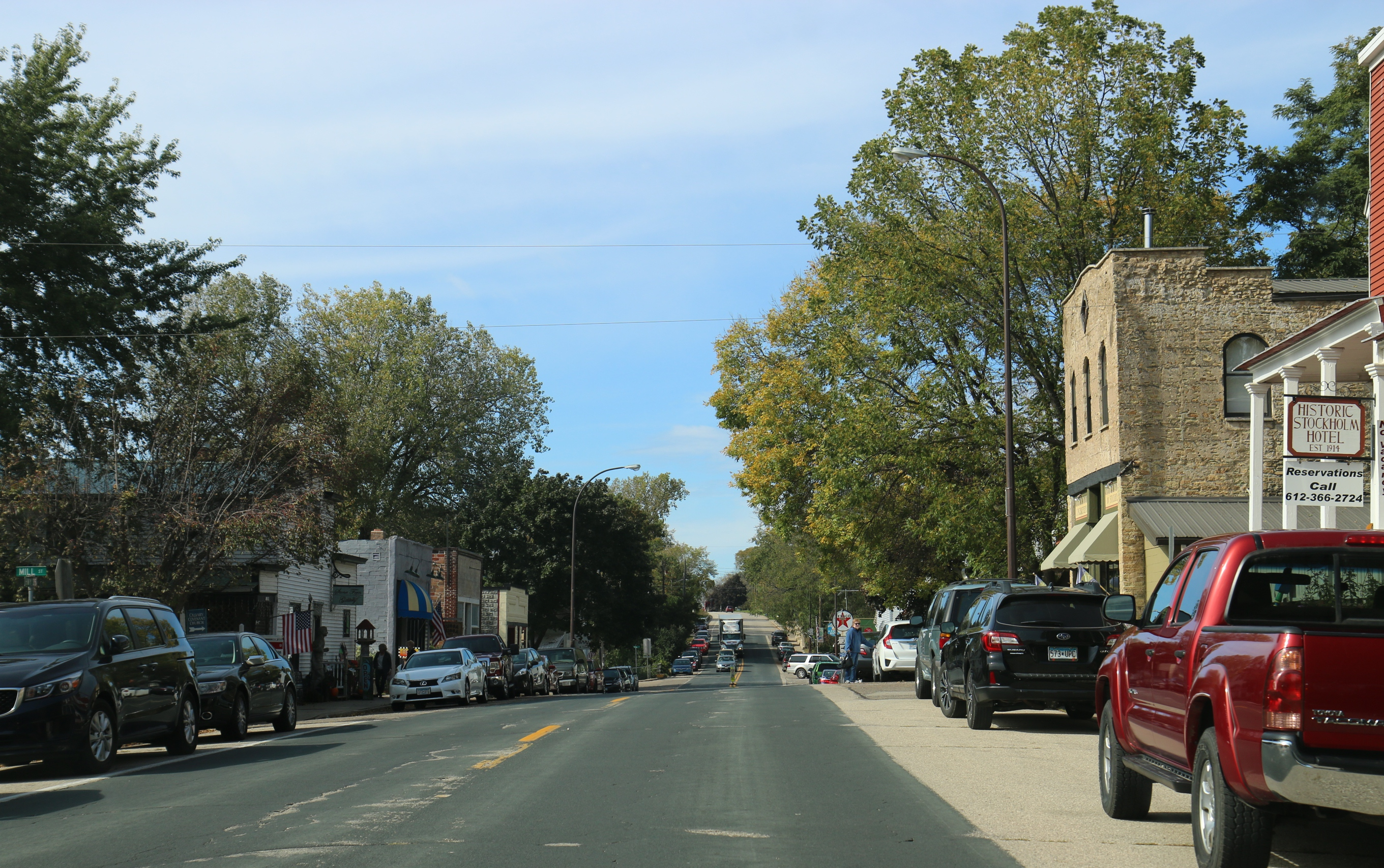
- Downtown Stockholm on WIS35

- Location of Stockholm in Pepin County, Wisconsin.
- Coordinates: 44°28′52″N 92°15′34″W
- Country: United States
- State: Wisconsin
- County: Pepin

Area
  - Total: 0.98 sq mi (2.54 km^{2})
  - Land: 0.94 sq mi (2.44 km^{2})
  - Water: 0.039 sq mi (0.10 km^{2})

Population (2020)
  - Total: 78
  - Density: 68.0/sq mi (26.26/km^{2})
- Time zone: UTC-6 (Central (CST))
  - Summer (DST): UTC-5 (CDT)
- Area codes: 715 & 534
- FIPS code: 55-77475
- Website: www.stockholmwisconsin.com

Stockholm is a village in Pepin County, Wisconsin, United States, founded in 1854 by immigrants from Karlskoga, Sweden, who named it after their country's capital. The population was 78 at the 2020 census. The village is located within the Town of Stockholm.

== Demographics ==
Historical population
Census	Pop.	Note	%±
1910	204		—
1920	207		1.5%
1930	205		−1.0%
1940	179		−12.7%
1950	124		−30.7%
1960	106		−14.5%
1970	99		−6.6%
1980	104		5.1%
1990	89		−14.4%
2000	97		9.0%
2010	66		−32.0%
2020	78		18.2%
U.S. Decennial Census

=== 2010 census ===
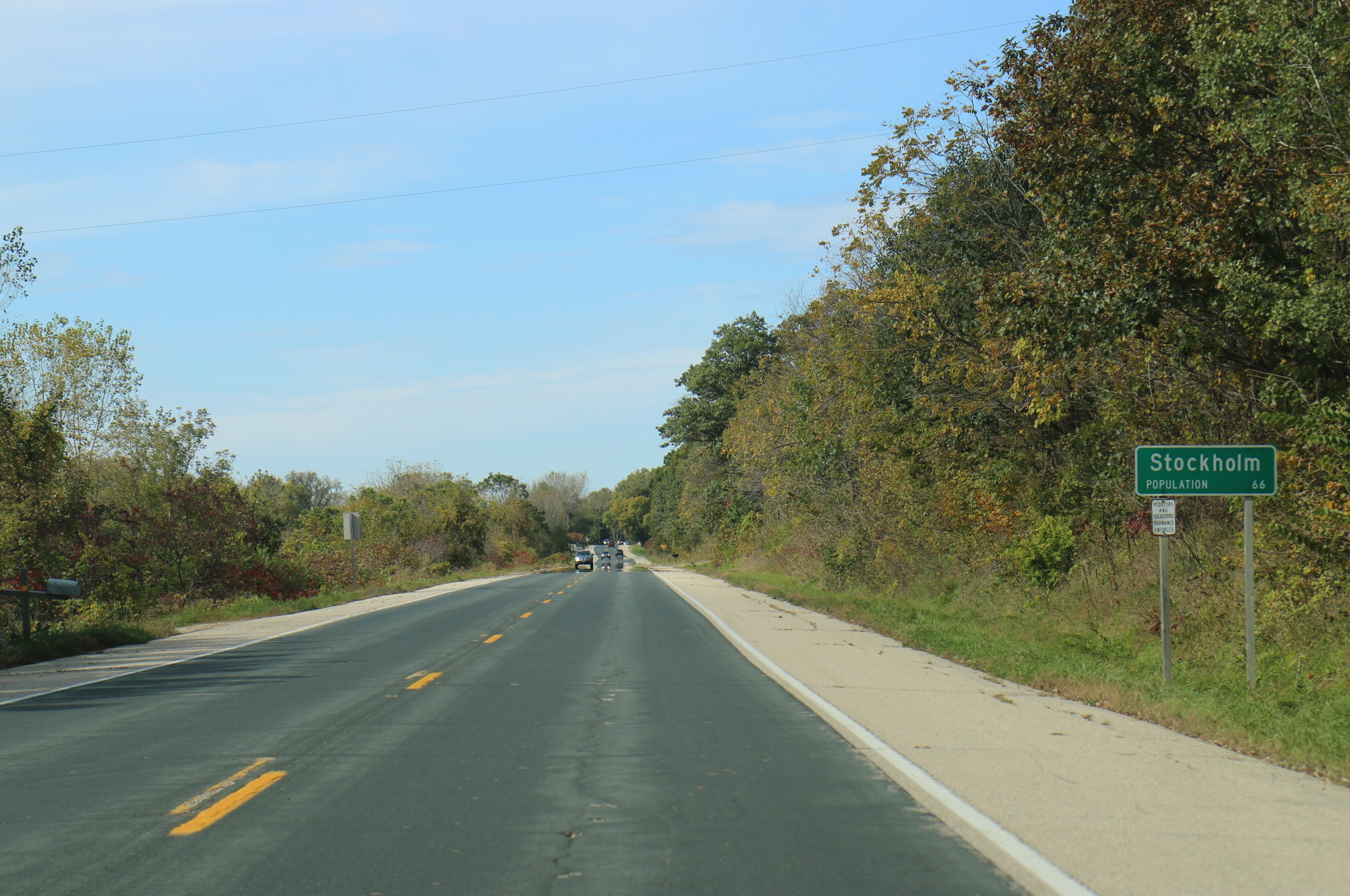
The sign for Stockholm on WIS35 in 2016

As of the census of 2010, there were 66 people, 36 households, and 21 families residing in the village. The population density was 73.3 inhabitants per square mile (28.3/km^{2}). There were 88 housing units at an average density of 97.8 per square mile (37.8/km^{2}). The racial makeup of the village was 100.0% White.

There were 36 households, of which 11.1% had children under the age of 18 living with them, 52.8% were married couples living together, 5.6% had a female householder with no husband present, and 41.7% were non-families. 38.9% of all households were made up of individuals, and 16.7% had someone living alone who was 65 years of age or older. The average household size was 1.83 and the average family size was 2.33.

The median age in the village was 59.3 years. 9.1% of residents were under the age of 18; 0% were between the ages of 18 and 24; 16.6% were from 25 to 44; 45.5% were from 45 to 64; and 28.8% were 65 years of age or older. The gender makeup of the village was 53.0% male and 47.0% female.

=== 2000 census ===
As of the census of 2000, there were 97 people, 48 households, and 30 families residing in the village. The population density was 104.0 inhabitants per square mile (40.2/km^{2}). There were 89 housing units at an average density of 95.4 per square mile (36.8/km^{2}). The racial makeup of the village was 100.00% white.

There were 48 households, out of which 16.7% had children under the age of 18 living with them, 56.3% were married couples living together, 4.2% had a female householder with no husband present, and 37.5% were non-families. 31.3% of all households were made up of individuals, and 6.3% had someone living alone who was 65 years of age or older. The average household size was 2.02 and the average family size was 2.53.

In the village, the population was spread out, with 15.5% under the age of 18, 6.2% from 18 to 24, 14.4% from 25 to 44, 42.3% from 45 to 64, and 21.6% who were 65 years of age or older. The median age was 52 years. For every 100 females, there were 120.5 males. For every 100 females age 18 and over, there were 121.6 males.

The median income for a household in the village was $41,250, and the median income for a family was $46,250. Males had a median income of $26,250 versus $26,667 for females. The per-capita income for the village was $55,006, and 8.6% of the population is below the poverty line.

== See also ==
- Stockholm, Sweden

== Bibliography ==
- Karlsson, Håkan (2014). Stockholm i Amerika (in Swedish).
