= Gustavsvik Manor =

Manor house in Kristinehamn, Sweden

Coordinates: 59.3451°N 14.0576°E

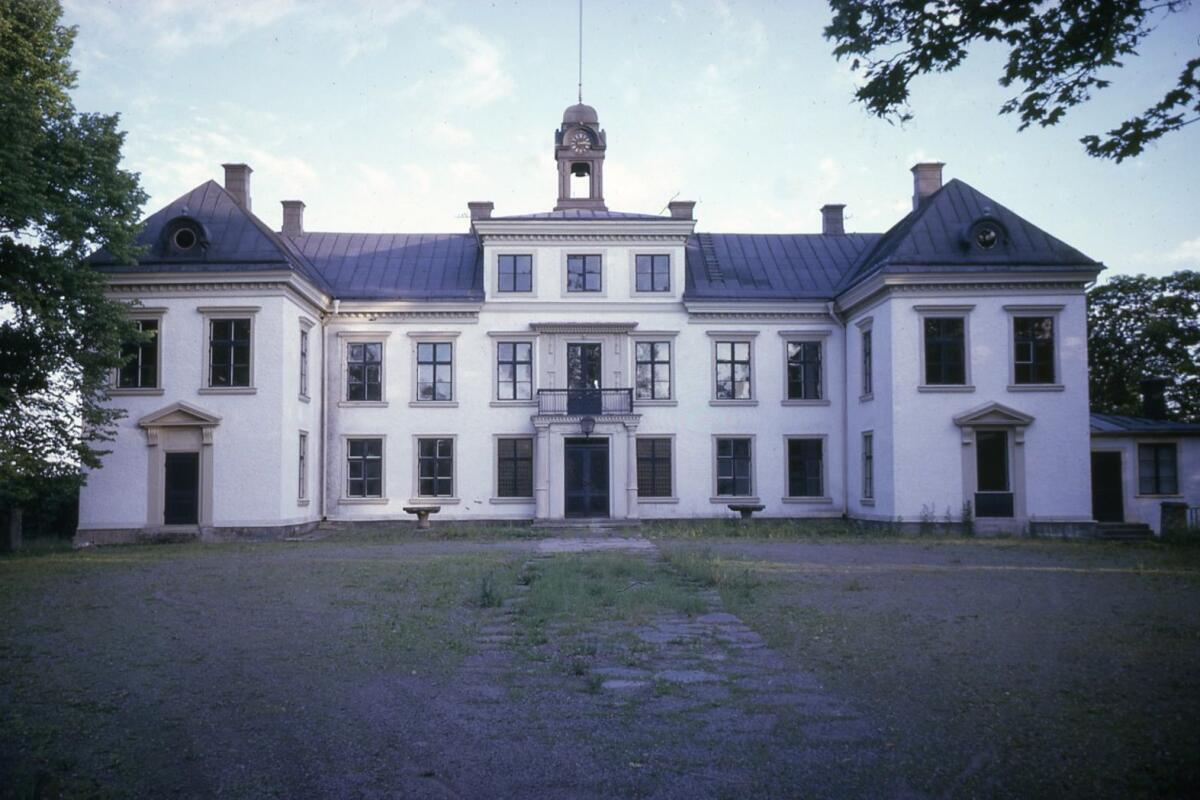
- Interactive map of the Gustavsvik Manor area

General information
- Type: Manor house
- Location: Kristinehamn, Sweden
- Demolished: 1967

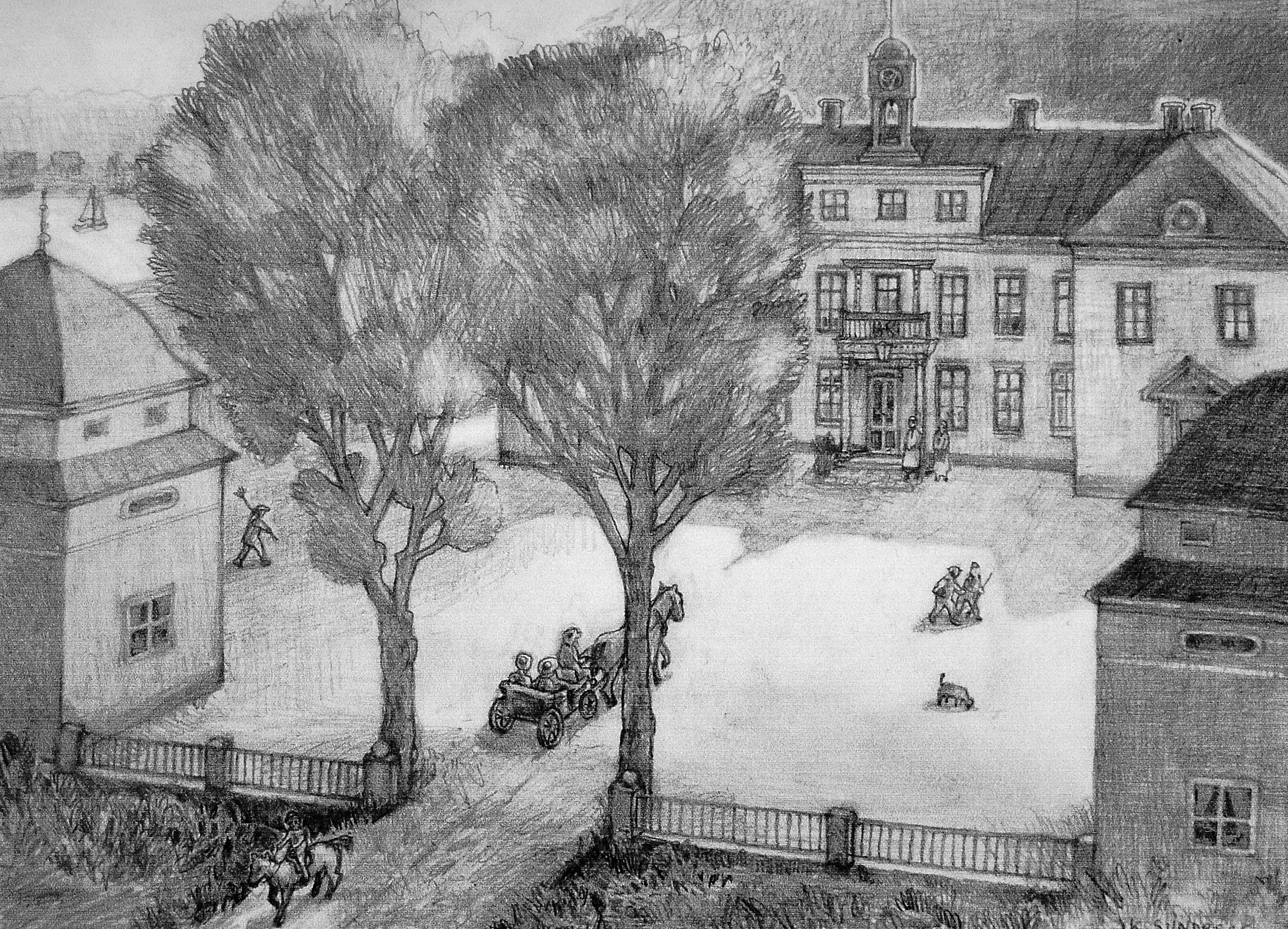
Sketch of Gustavsvik by Kjell Sundberg

Gustavsvik Manor (Swedish: Gustavsviks herrgård) was a manor house. The building was struck by a fire in 1967 and was never rebuilt.

The manor was located in Kristinehamn Municipality, Värmland County, Sweden.

Gustavsvik was located within a park-like garden, that is still preserved.

In 1736, Gustavsvik was acquired by the Linroth family.

== See also ==
- List of castles and palaces in Sweden
