= August Blanche =

Swedish journalist, novelist, and politician (1811–1868)

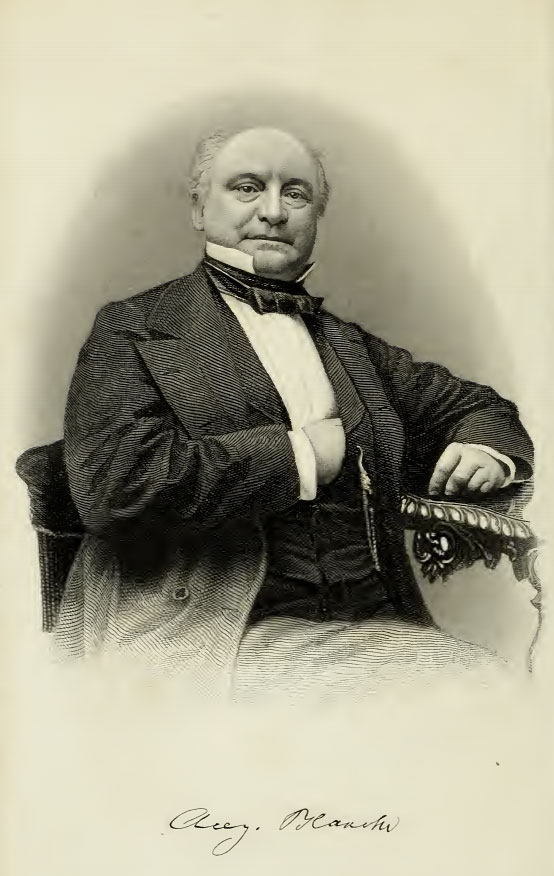
August Blanche (1811–1868).

August Blanche (17 September 1811 – 30 November 1868) was a Swedish journalist, novelist, and politician.

== Life ==
August Theodor Blanche was born in Stockholm, Sweden, the illegitimate child of a servant girl and a priest. His mother eventually married Johan Jacob Blanck, a blacksmith, and the boy took his stepfather's name. A brilliant student, in 1838 he obtained a law degree and for a time, worked as a civil servant until taking up journalism. In the early 1840s, he began writing plays for the theater as well as translating plays from foreign languages into Swedish. By the middle of the decade, he was writing novels and short stories of intrigue, all of which met with a great deal of success.

An activist, in 1859 Blanche was elected to the Riksdag of the Estates where he served until 1866. He died of a heart attack two years later, on 30 November 1868, on the way to participate in the unveiling of the statue of King Charles the XII, which he had lobbied for.

August Blanche is interred in the Norra begravningsplatsen in Stockholm.

== See also ==
Stockholms Figaro
