= Alkvettern Manor =

Coordinates: 59°18′35″N 14°35′11″E

- Alkvetterns herrgård
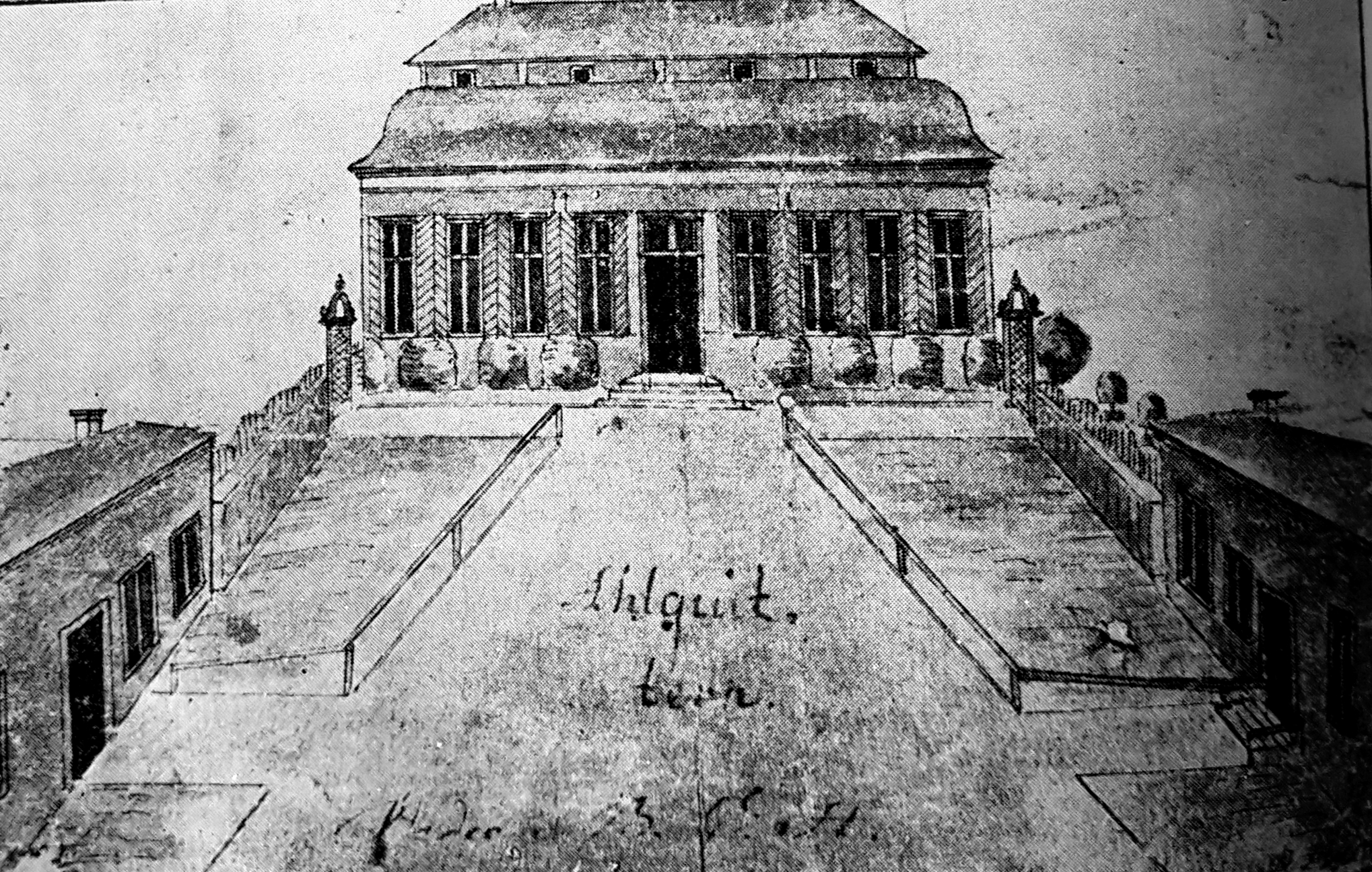
- Alkvettern Manor, in 1772, by Johan Gustaf Härstedt
- Interactive map of the Alkvettern Manor area

General information
- Type: Manor house
- Location: Storfors Municipality, Värmland County, Sweden

Website
- https://www.alkvetternsherrgard.se/

Alkvettern Manor (Swedish: Alkvetterns herrgård, Swedish pronunciation: [alkvɛʈɛɳ]) is a manor house at lake Alkvettern in Bjurtjärn, Storfors Municipality, Värmland County. It is located near Kyrksten, southeast of Storfors and 13 km (8 mi) northwest of Karlskoga. The manor has served as residence for members of several notable Swedish families, for instance the af Geijerstam, Mitander and Linroth families.

== History ==
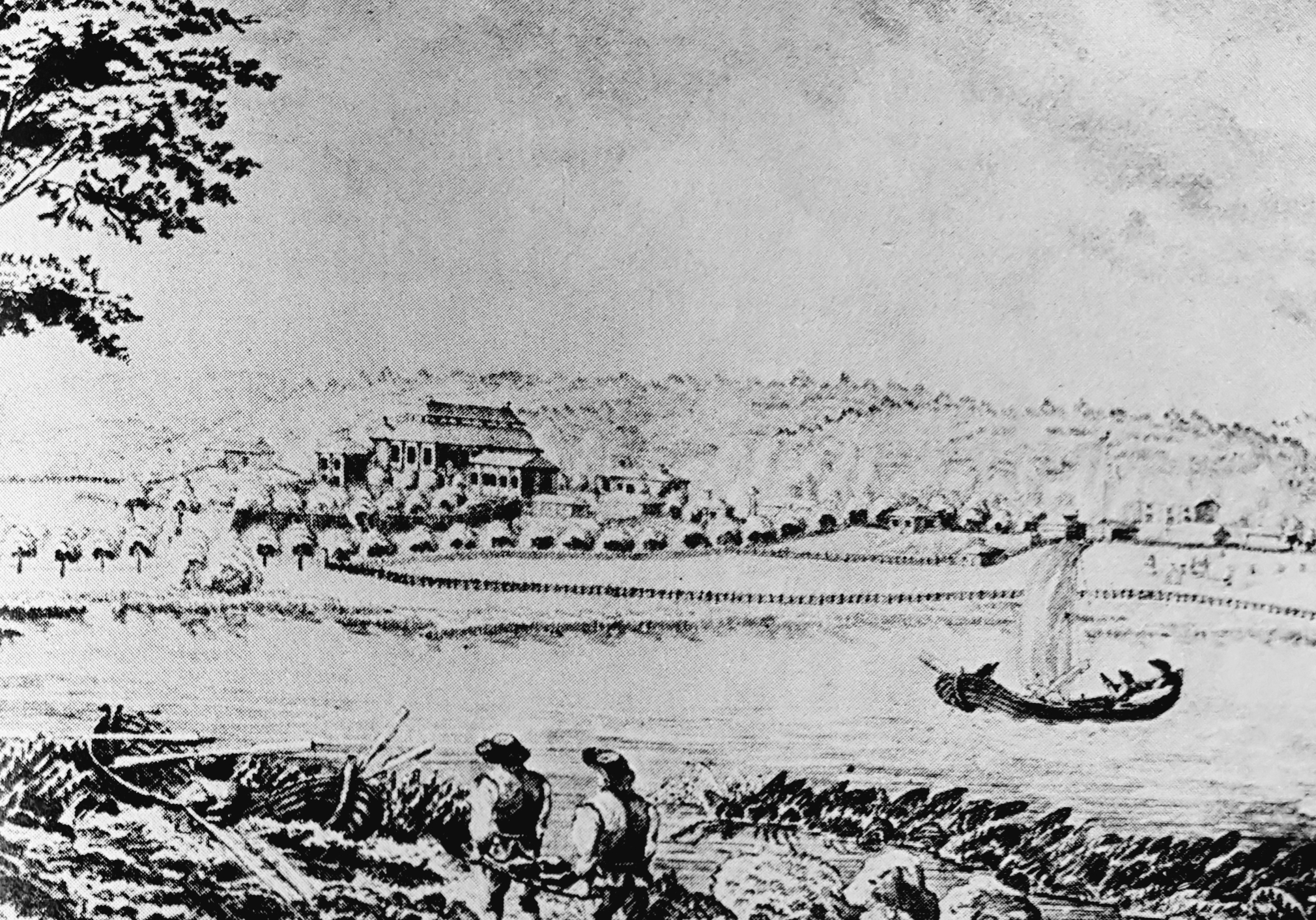
Alkvettern Manor and surroundings in a 1780s painting

The current-standing manor house was completed in the 17th century, and it traces its history to the 13th century.

The estate, acquired by Karin Nilsdotter Bielke at the end of the 16th century, was inherited by her daughter Brita Eriksdotter Gyllenstjärna in 1596.

The current-standing white-colored manor house was rebuilt at the beginning of the 19th century by Johan Henrik af Geijerstam.

The manor house is currently the only listed building in Storfors Municipality, and it is currently privately owned.
