= Stockholms Figaro =

Swedish illustrated fiction

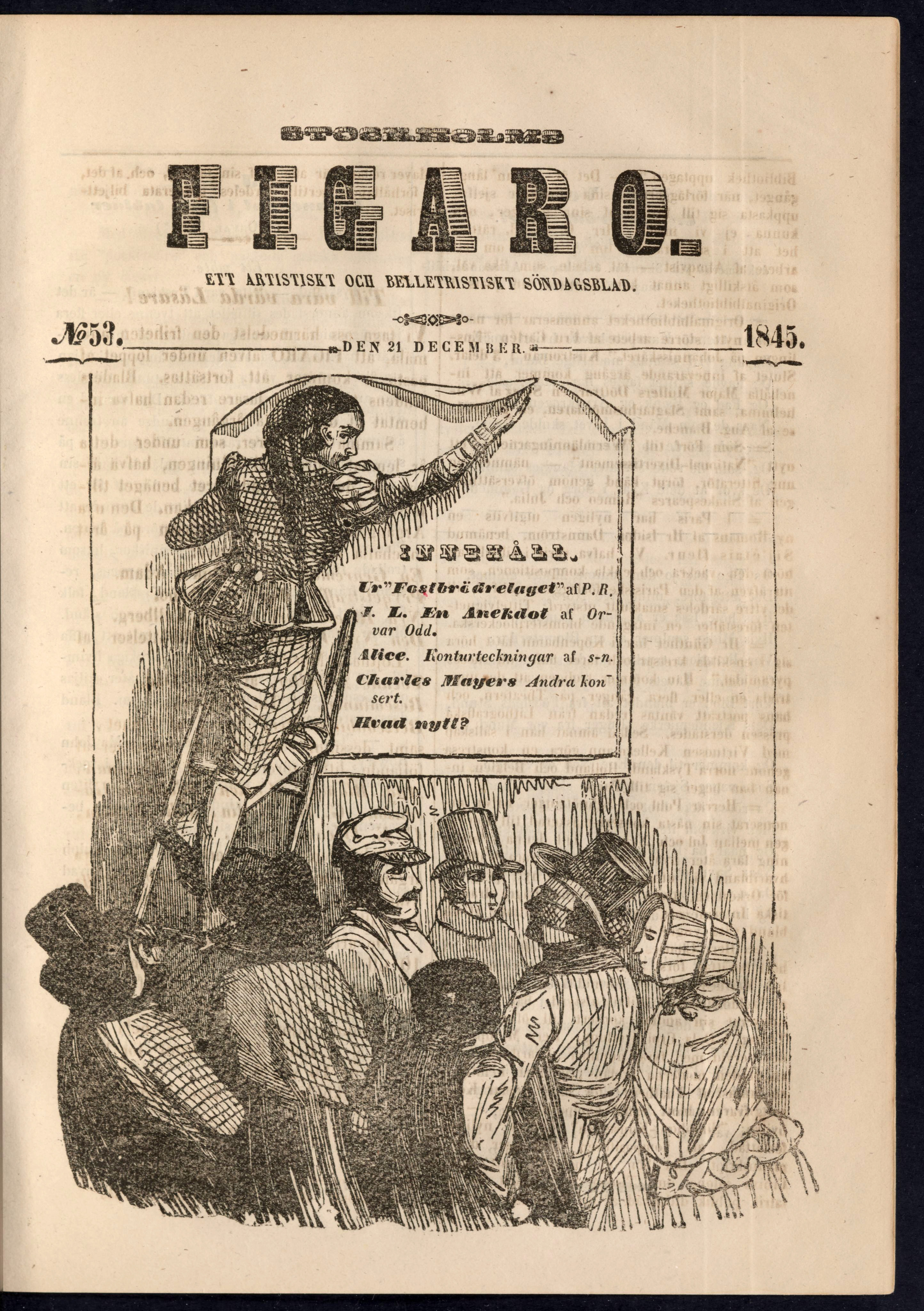
Stockholm Figaro no. 53, 1845

Stockholms Figaro was a Swedish illustrated fiction short lived weekly publication, published in Stockholm, Sweden, between December 1844 through the end of 1847. Albert Bonnier was the editor and publisher.

The content of Stockholms Figaro consisted mostly of poems, short stories, literary and art criticism. Each edition had about seven pages. Among the staff were Carl August Adlersparre (Albano), August Blanche, JG Carlén, M. Cramser (Caprice), JA Kiellman-Göransson (Nepomuk), GH Mellin, Johan Nybom, Oscar Patric Sturzen-Becker (Orvar Odd), V. Stålberg and Carl Anton Wetterbergh (Uncle Adam).

Author describes:

Albert's long-term plan was to attract the sharpest pens in the country through periodic publishing... he launched Stockholm's Figaro, a fiction writing illustrated weekly with Albert himself as editor.

== See also ==
Mathilda Ebeling
