= Mathilda Ebeling =

Swedish operatic soprano

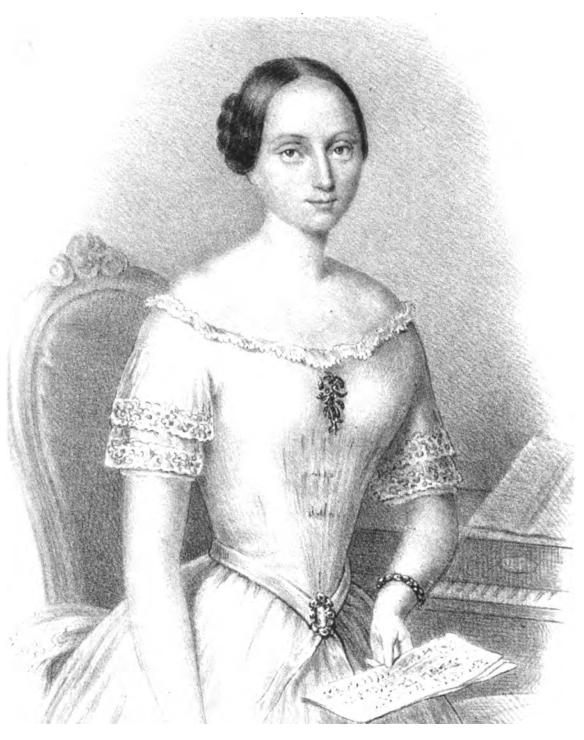
Mathilda Ebeling

Aurora Mathilda Ebeling (1826–1851) was a Swedish soprano opera singer. After first appearing as a concert pianist in 1842, she made her singing debut at Stockholm's Mindre Theatre in 1844. She performed at the Royal Swedish Opera from 1846 to 1848 before further study in Paris and an engagement with Berlin's Royal Opera in 1850.

== Biography ==
Born in Stockholm County on 11 October 1826, Mathilda Ebeling was the daughter of the flautist Johan Ludvig Ebeling and Aurora Olivia Björkman. She received piano lessons from Wilhelmina Josephson. At the age of 15, she gave her first major concert as a pianist in Stockholm's Stock Exchange Hall where she showed promise as one of the country's most notable performers. Nevertheless, following the encouragement of the composer Johan Magnus Rosén, she decided to take singing lessons which led to her début in the opera Farinelli at the Mindre Theatre in 1844.

In 1845, she was admitted to the Royal Opera as a student, making a highly successful début the following year in The Magic Flute. The opera proved so popular that it ran for over a hundred performances, playing to full houses ten times in succession. Writing in Stockholms Figaro a critic complimented her as a "bright star" who had "great promise with her full voice, a true sense of music and a propensity for deep perception". She went on to play the roles of Anna in Don Giovanni, Agathe in Der Freischütz, Adalgisa in Norma and the countess in The Marriage of Figaro. Her career in Sweden came to an abrupt end when she began suffering from a pulmonary ailment.

In 1848 Ebeling continued her studies in Paris under Manuel García. Thereafter she appeared in various locations in Germany, giving her last performance in Berlin, shortly before her death on 1 December 1851.
