= Stockholm (town), Wisconsin =

Stockholm, Wisconsin
- Town
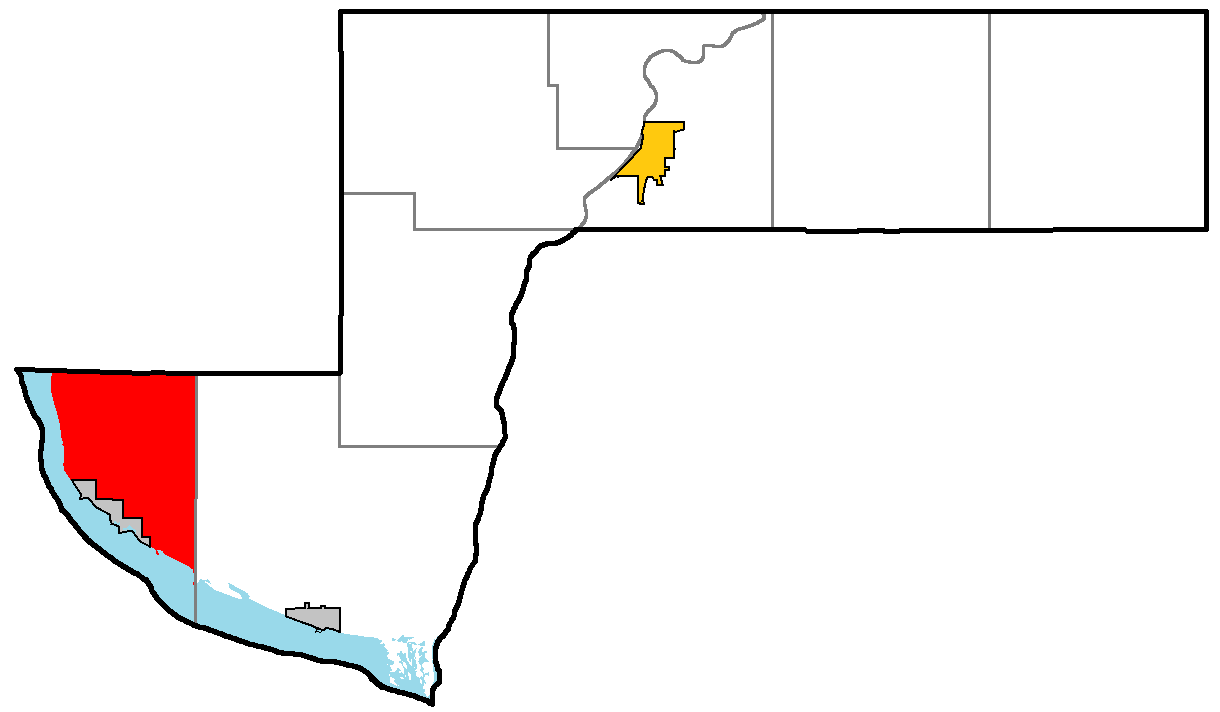
- Location of Stockholm, Pepin County

- Location of Pepin County, Wisconsin
- Coordinates: 44°30′18″N 92°15′24″W
- Country: United States
- State: Wisconsin
- County: Pepin

Area
  - Total: 21.7 sq mi (56.3 km^{2})
  - Land: 15.4 sq mi (39.8 km^{2})
  - Water: 6.4 sq mi (16.5 km^{2})
- Elevation: 1,152 ft (351 m)

Population (2020)
  - Total: 218
  - Density: 14.2/sq mi (5.48/km^{2})
- Time zone: UTC-6 (Central (CST))
  - Summer (DST): UTC-5 (CDT)
- Area codes: 715 & 534
- FIPS code: 55-77500
- GNIS feature ID: 1584229
- Website: https://townofstockholm.org/

Stockholm is a town in Pepin County, Wisconsin, United States. The population was 218 at the 2020 census. The Village of Stockholm is located within the town.

== History ==
In 1854, this site at the foot of the Mississippi bluffs was the destination of more than 200 emigrants from the impoverished Bjurtjärn socken, in Värmland, Sweden. The area was surveyed and a plat lay out for a community the Swedish immigrant settlers called Stockholm, the same name as the capital of Sweden. Early industries included fishing and clamming. Commercial fish provided thousands of barrels of Lake Pepin fish for the eastern markets. Clamming provided the raw material for button factories. Twenty years of harvesting diminished the supply, signaling the end of this business. The ice industry began as soon as the Burlington Railroad was completed through Stockholm. It was the only place on Lake Pepin where ice was shipped to the large cities.

== Geography ==
According to the United States Census Bureau, the town has a total area of 21.7 square miles (56.3 km^{2}), of which, 15.4 square miles (39.8 km^{2}) of it is land and 6.4 square miles (16.5 km^{2}) of it (29.35%) is water.

== Demographics ==
As of the census of 2000, there were 75 people, 35 households, and 24 families residing in the town. The population density was 4.9 people per square mile (1.9/km^{2}). There were 65 housing units at an average density of 4.2 per square mile (1.6/km^{2}). The racial makeup of the town was 100.00% White.

There were 35 households, out of which 25.7% had children under the age of 18 living with them, 62.9% were married couples living together, 2.9% had a female householder with no husband present, and 31.4% were non-families. 25.7% of all households were made up of individuals, and 14.3% had someone living alone who was 65 years of age or older. The average household size was 2.14 and the average family size was 2.54.

In the town, the population was spread out, with 17.3% under the age of 18, 2.7% from 18 to 24, 18.7% from 25 to 44, 38.7% from 45 to 64, and 22.7% who were 65 years of age or older. The median age was 52 years. For every 100 females, there were 87.5 males. For every 100 females age 18 and over, there were 93.8 males.

The median income for a household in the town was $32,250, and the median income for a family was $58,750. Males had a median income of $38,750 versus $19,375 for females. The per capita income for the town was $21,329. None of the population or the families were below the poverty line.
