= Storfors Church =

Coordinates: 59.5335°N 14.2809°E

- Storfors kyrka
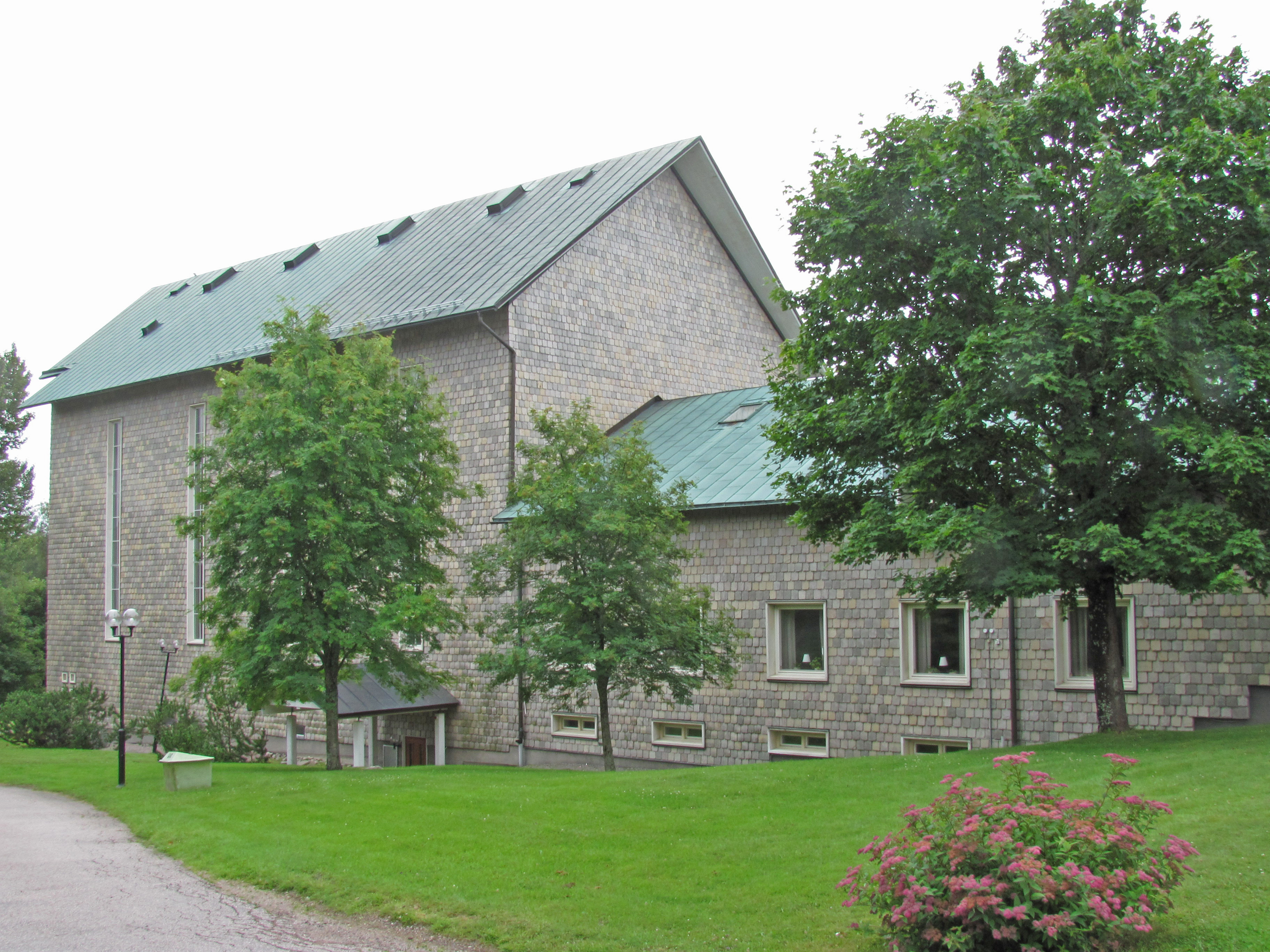
- Storfors Church in July 2011
- Storfors Church
- Location: Storfors
- Country: Sweden
- Denomination: Church of Sweden

History
- Consecrated: 10 May 1959

Architecture
- Architect: Tor Engloo

Administration
- Diocese: Karlstad
- Parish: Storfors

Storfors Church (Swedish: Storfors kyrka) is a church building in Storfors, which is located in the Diocese of Karlstad of the Church of Sweden. Storfors is situated between Kristinehamn and Filipstad. The church was built in 1959 from drawing plans by architect Tor Engloo. On 10 May 1959, the church was inaugurated by bishop Gert Borgenstierna.

The building has a concrete base and outer walls in glavashiffer. The roof is made of copper plates. The church room is orientated in an east-west direction, with the cross located to the east. The inner-walls are twelve meters high. A seven sided baptismal font of limestone from Gotland was made by the stone shopper R Eklund in Bisby, and was placed in the church in 1964. In the cross hangs an apostle crown designed by Knut Hallberg; the apostle crown is a light crown made of brass with twelve stearing lights. The pulpit is made of light wood.

== Gallery ==
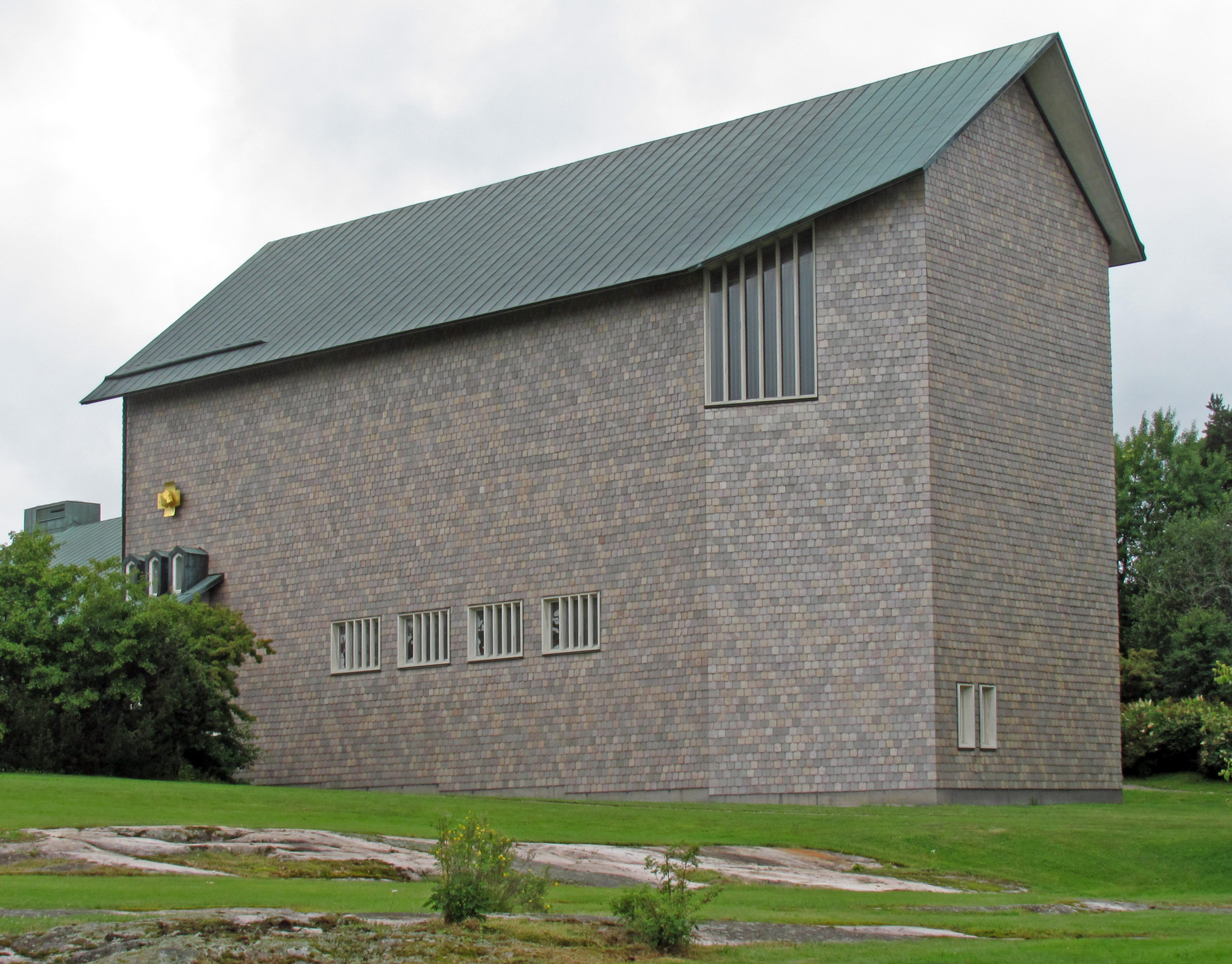

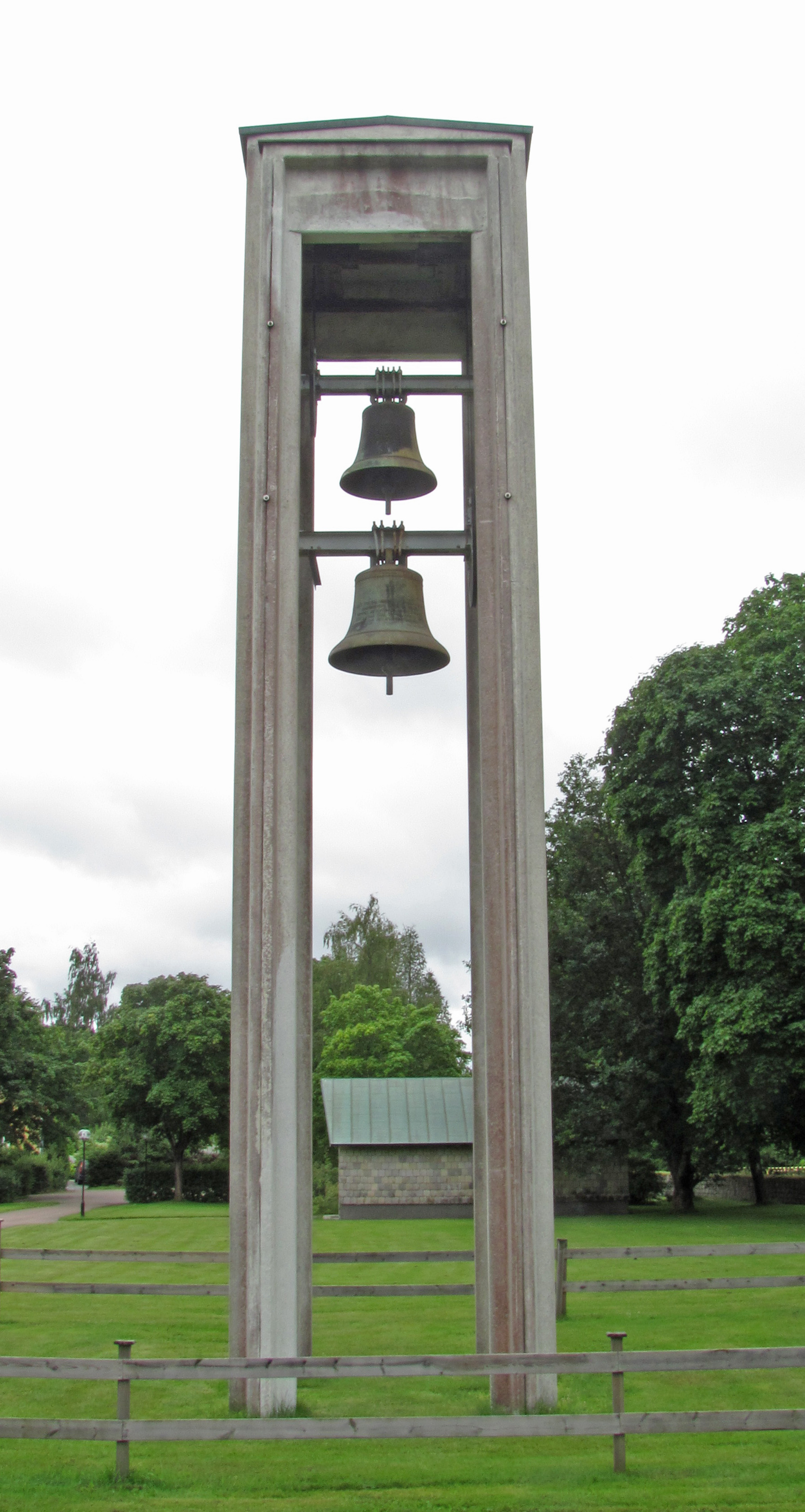

== Other websites ==
- Media related to Storfors kyrka at Wikimedia Commons
