= Geijer family =

Geijer
- Swedish family
- Country: Sweden
- Estate: Alkvettern Manor
- Cadet branches: af Geijerstam von Geijer

Geijer (Swedish: [ˈjɛ̌jɛr]) is a Swedish family. According to tradition, it immigrated from Austria in the early 17th century. The family includes the noble branches af Geijerstam and von Geijer. The af Geijerstam branch is descended from Emanuel af Geijerstam (1730–1788), who was ennobled in 1773 and introduced at the House of Nobility in the following year with the number 2010. The von Geijer branch is descended from lieutenant-colonel Carl Emanuel Geijer (1777–1865), who was ennobled in 1817 and introduced at the House of Nobility in 1818 with the number 2256.
