= Sofia Adlersparre =

Swedish artist (1808–1862)

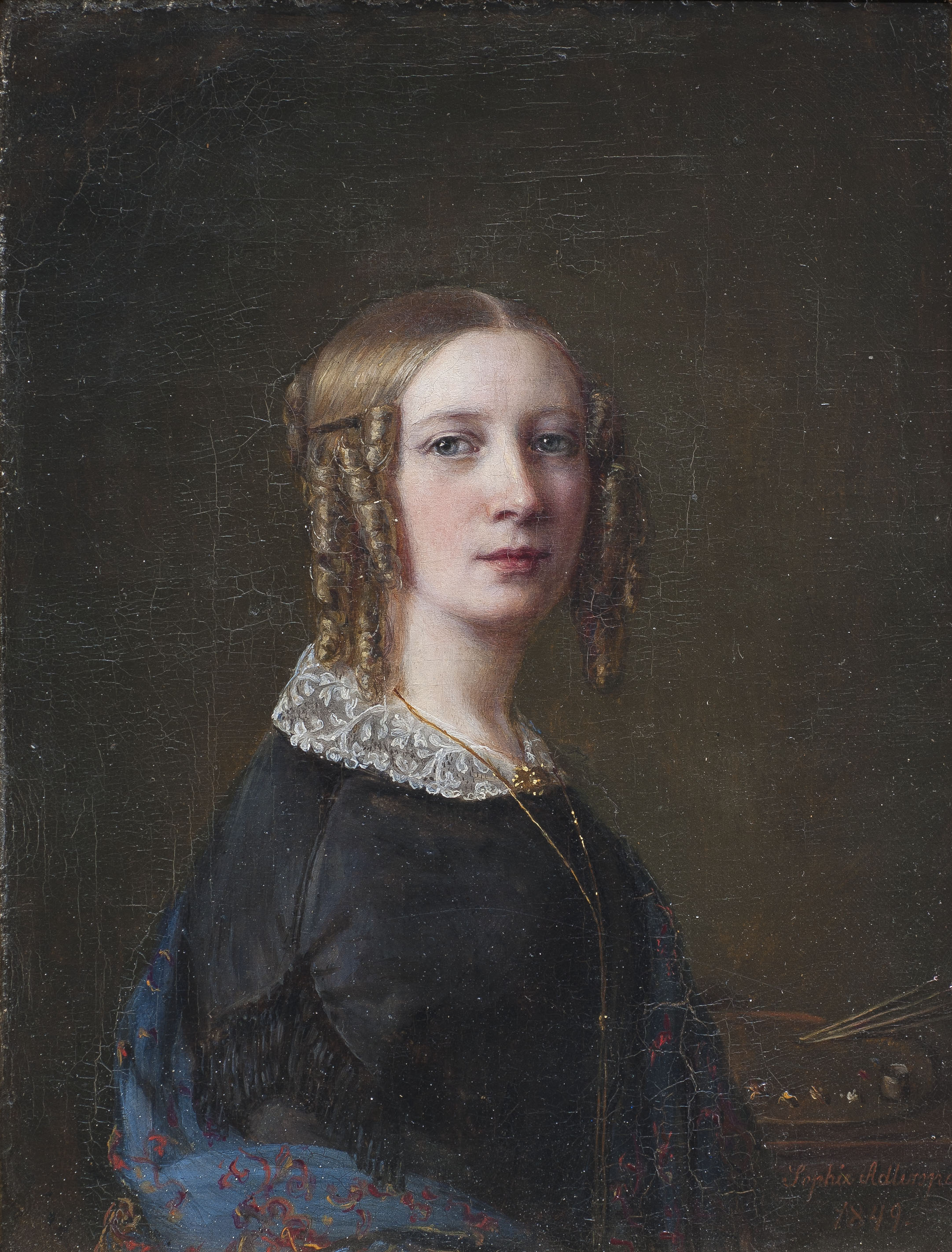
- Born: 6 March 1808
- Died: 23 March 1862 (aged 54)
- Known for: painting
- Movement: Romantic

Sofia Adolfina Adlersparre (6 March 1808 – 23 March 1862) was a Swedish painter from the Adlersparre family.

== Biography ==
She was born the daughter of a Lutheran nobleman, Axel Adlersparre, governor of Öland, and Carolina von Arbin, and displayed a talent for painting in childhood. When the artist C. F. Pedersen became shipwrecked near her home, she was taught by him, and when her family moved to Stockholm in 1830, she was educated by the artists Carl Gustaf Qvarnström (1810–1867), Johan Gustaf Sandberg and Olof Johan Södermark (1790–1848).

She debuted in 1836 when Crown Princess, Josephine of Leuchtenberg, the future Queen of Sweden, ordered a painting from her and introduced her to useful contacts.

Adlersparre made several trips to study art abroad, to Germany, Italy and France. In 1839–1840, she studied under Leon Coignet in Paris, where she met Carl Wahlbom and Per Wickenberg. When she returned to Sweden, she opened a drawing school, where Amalia Lindegren was among her pupils.

In 1845, the Queen financed her continued studies in Paris; in 1845–1846, she studied in Dresden, where she was inspired by J. C. Dahl and Caspar David Friedrich and copied older paintings, and in 1851–1855 she was given state support to study in Munich, Bologna, Florence and Rome. In Rome, she was a member of the Swedish artist colony and made contact with the German artist colony and the Nazarene movement under Friedrich Overbeck. She also converted to Catholicism and painted Pope Pius IX. Her paintings reflected the Romantic style of the era, though she was also much influenced by the Renaissance artist Raphael.

In 1855, Adlersparre made a visit to Sweden, where her works were exhibited in the Royal Palace.

In 1862, she returned permanently to Sweden and was granted a pension from the Litteratörernas och Artisternas pensionsförening. She died shortly after receiving the first payment. The same year, her brother's wife, the feminist Sophie Adlersparre, demanded that women should be able to study art at the Royal Swedish Academy of Arts on the same terms as men. This demand was met in 1864.

== Gallery ==
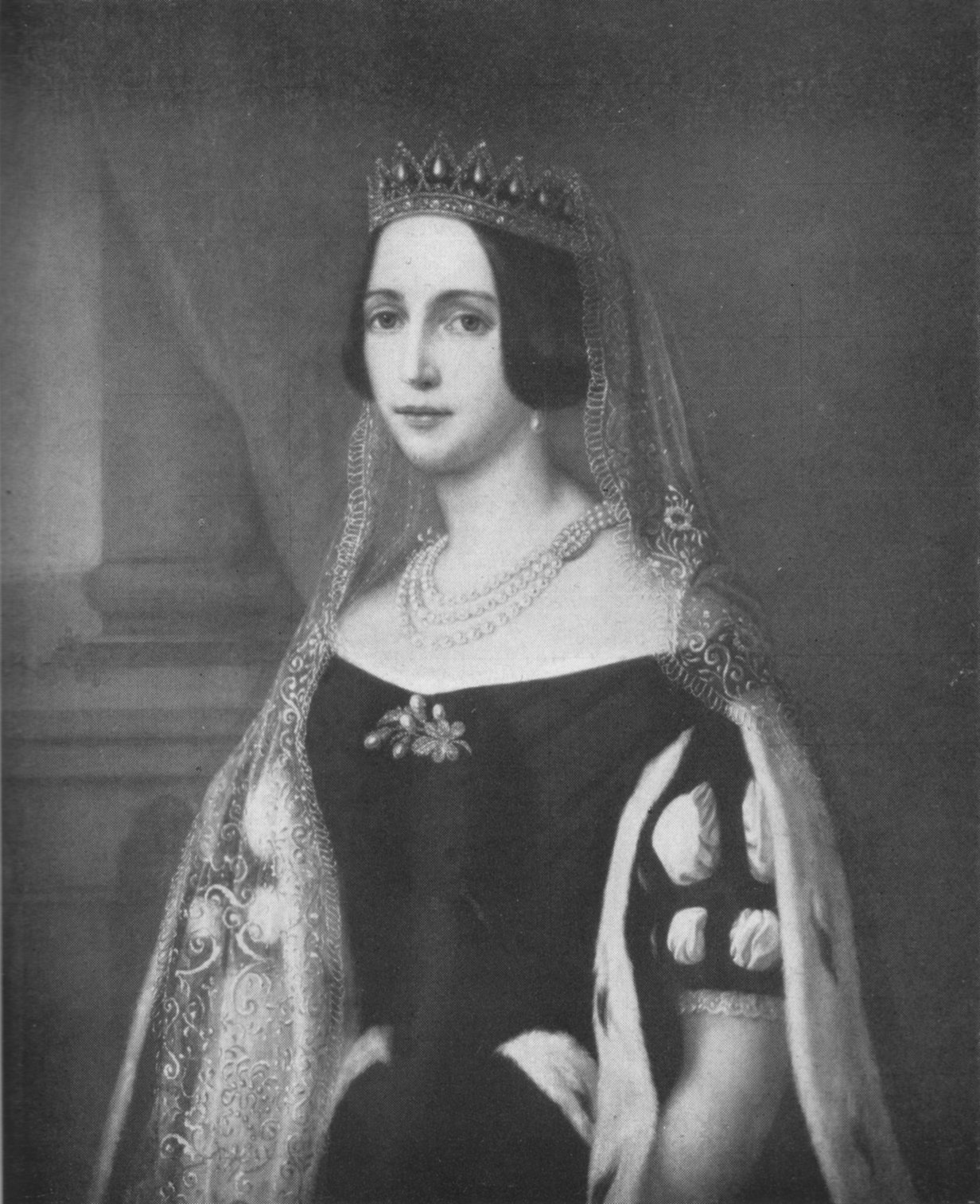
Queen Joséphine, by Sofia Adlersparre.

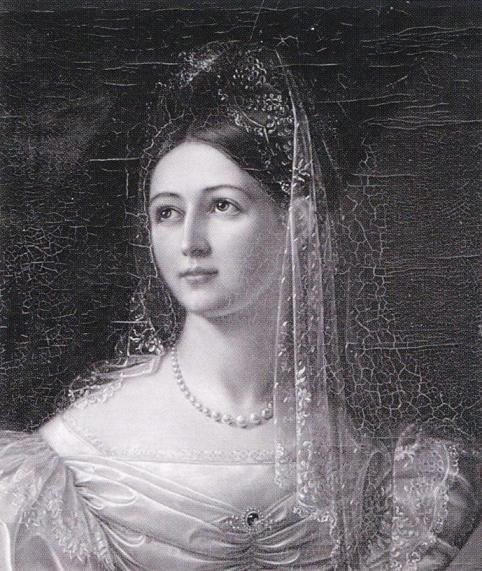
Mathilda Rotkirch (1813–1842) by Sofia Aldersparre

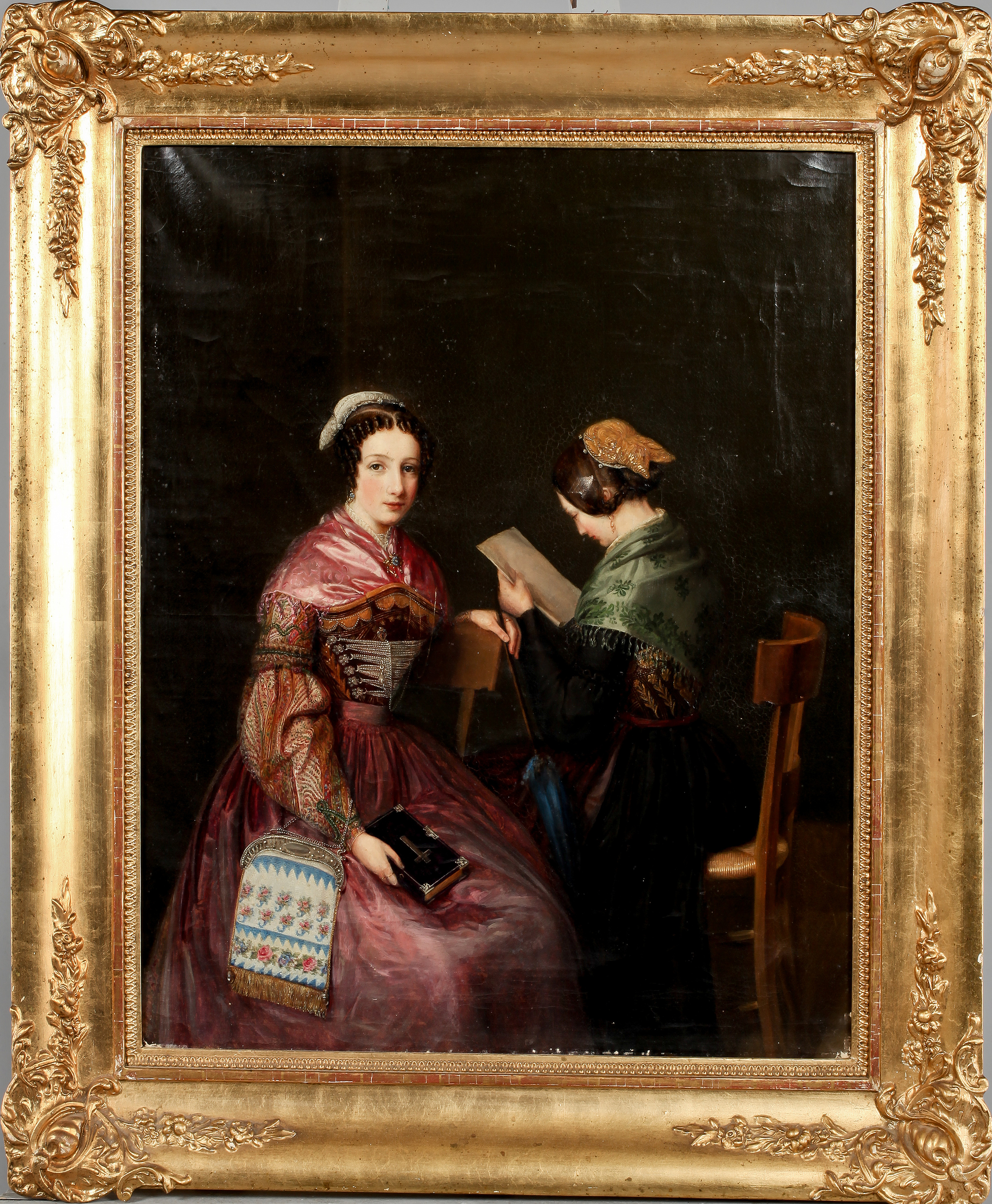
Double portrait

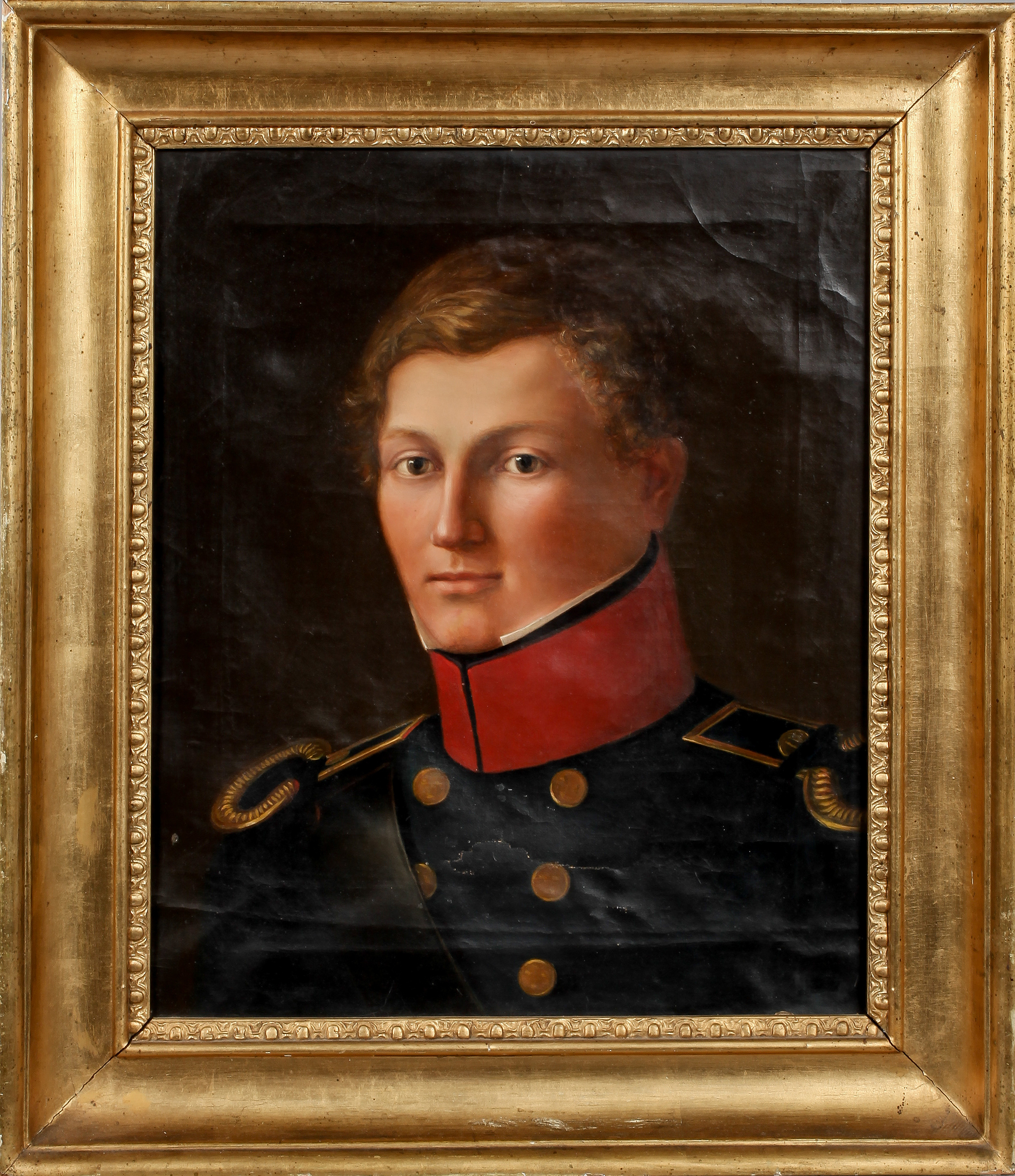
Portrait of a man

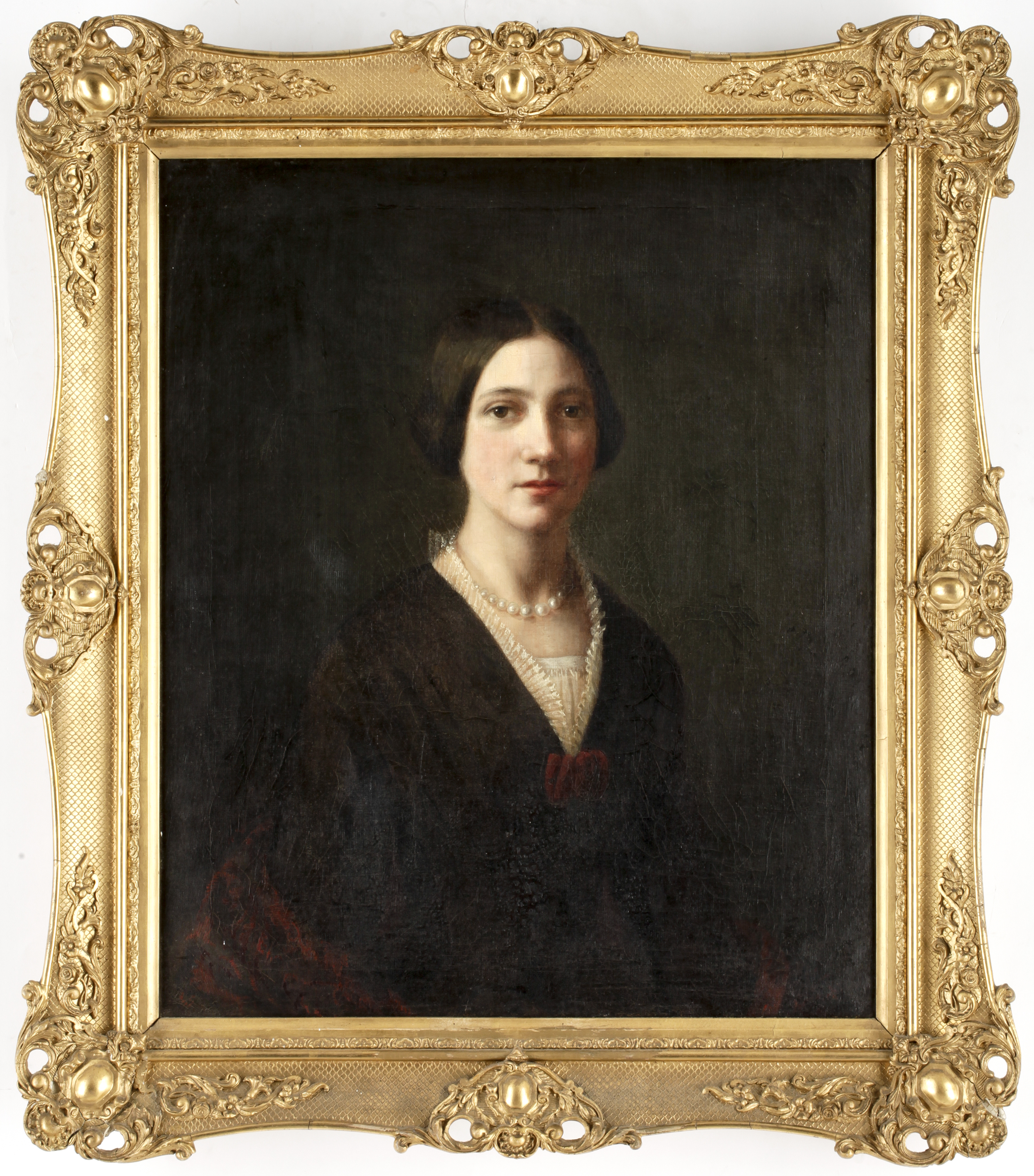
Portrait of a woman

== Sources ==
- Österberg, Carin et al., Svenska kvinnor: föregångare, nyskapare. Lund: Signum 1990. (ISBN 91-87896-03-6) (in Swedish)
- Stålberg, Wilhelmina & P. G. Berg. Anteckningar om svenska qvinnor 1864-1866 (in Swedish)
