= Oscar Patric Sturzen-Becker =

Swedish poet and writer (1811–1869)

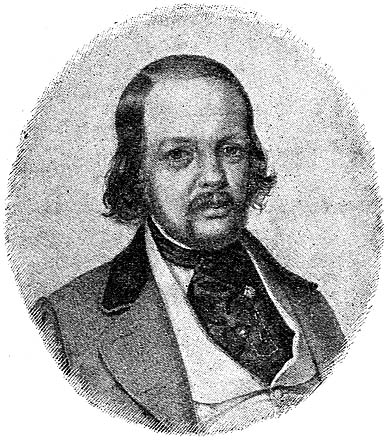
Oscar Patric Sturzen-Becker

Oscar Patric Sturzen-Becker (1811, Stockholm – 1869) was a Swedish poet, writer and journalist, who often wrote under the pseudonym Orvar Odd.

He wrote several volumes of poetry, and worked at different newspapers, most notable in the 1830s at the liberal Aftonbladet, and in the short lived 1940s weekly publication Stockholms Figaro.

The street Orvar Odds väg at Kungsholmen in Stockholm is named after him, and in Helsingborg there is a Sturzen-Beckers park.
