= Adlersparre family =

Adlersparre
- Swedish noble family
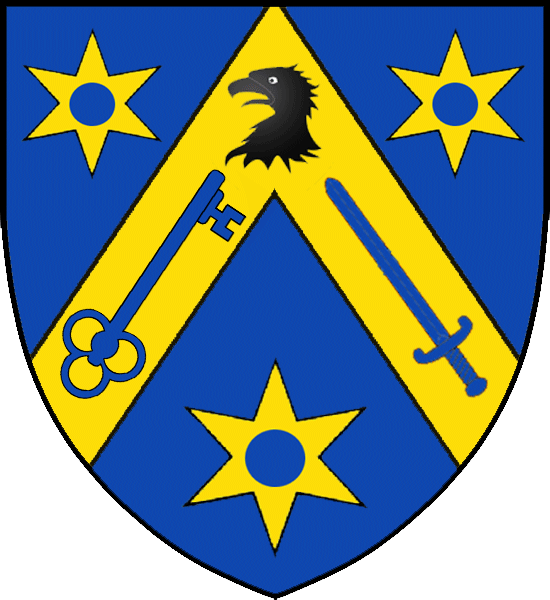
- Country: Sweden

Adlersparre is a Swedish noble family, which is descended from the mayor of Bogesund (which is now named Ulricehamn) Christopher Andersson, who was active during the earlier half of the 17th century.

His male-line great-grandson, the captain at Jämtland's regiment, and later lieutenant colonel Christopher Christophersson (1718–1799), was ennobled 1 December 1757 at Stockholm Palace by King Adolphus Frederick of Sweden with the name Adlersparre and was introduced at the Swedish house of nobility 29 April 1773 as noble family number 1988.

One of his sons, the cabinet minister and later one of the lords of the realm, the governor of Skaraborgs län and the major general Georg Adlersparre (1760–1835), was created a Swedish baron 29 June 1809 and thus founded the baronial family Adlersparre.

Other members of the family include the painter Sofia Adlersparre (1808–1862) and the feminist Sophie Adlersparre (1823–1895).
