= Linroth family =

Swedish noble family

Linroth
- Swedish noble family
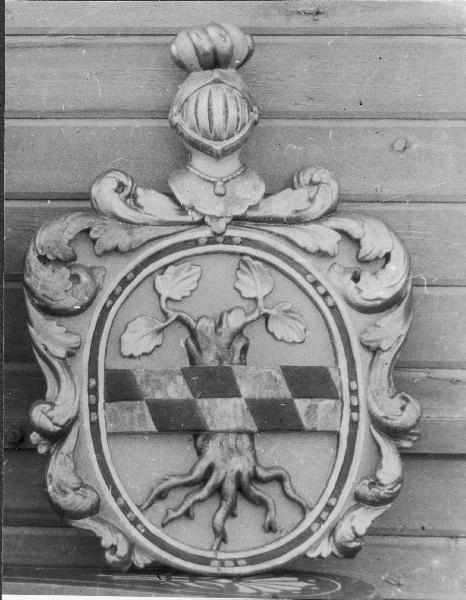
- Coat of arms
- Country: Sweden
- Founded: 1691
- Current head: None
- Estates: Alkvettern Manor; Gustavsvik Manor
- Dissolution: 2011

The Linroth family, also known as Linderoth family, was a Swedish noble family, that rose to prominence with Elias Linroth. The family was elevated to noble rank in the Kingdom of Sweden. Its grants of arms is preserved at the House of Nobility, following its dissolution.

== Overview ==
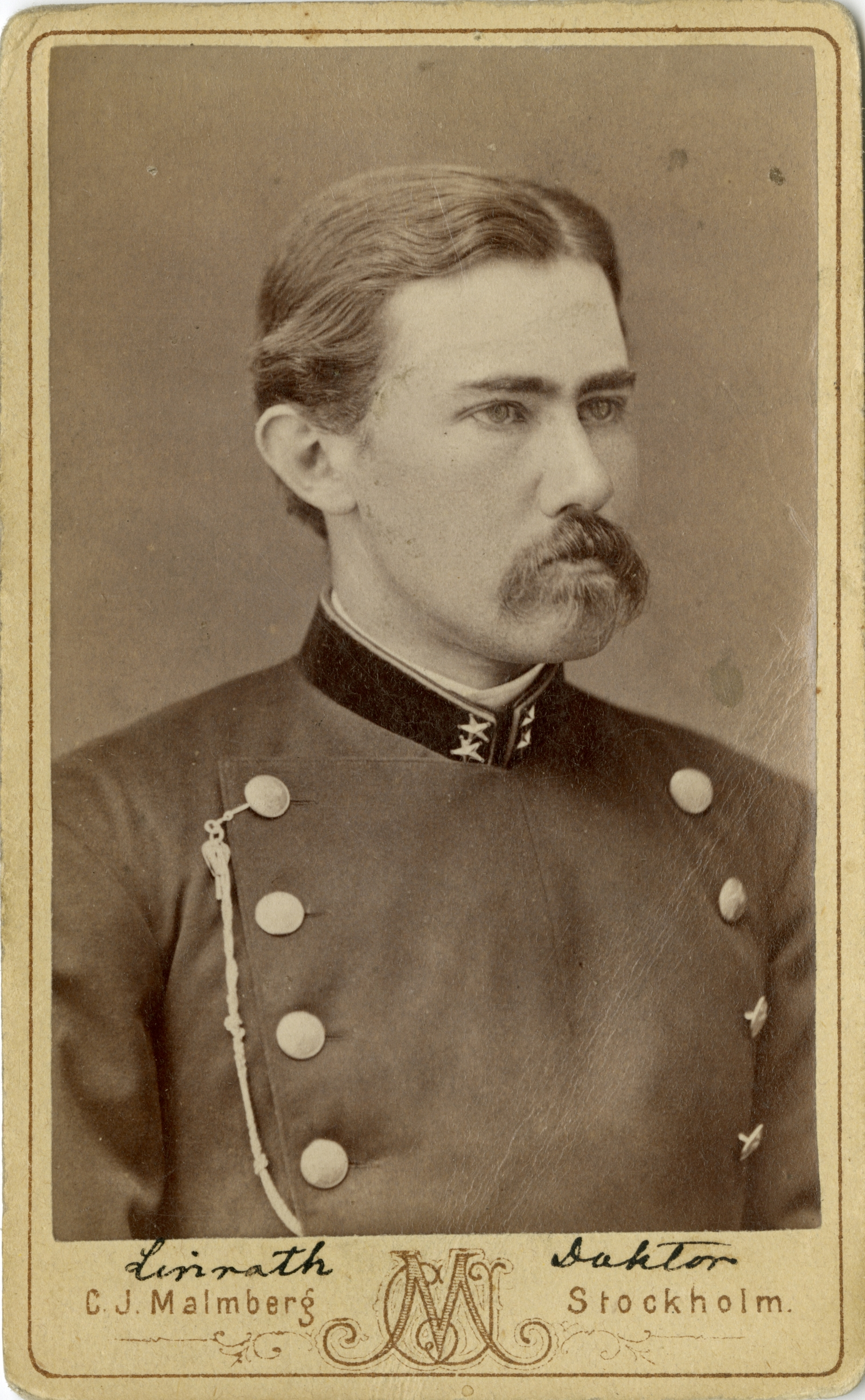
Klas Mauritz Linroth

The earliest known member of the Linroth family, Laurentius Theodori, served as a vicar. His son, ironmaster Elias, took the name Linroth. The Linroth family established itself as a family managing ironworks in the historical province of Värmland during the 17th and 18th centuries.

Elias Linrot acquired the Alkvettern and Lanfors Ironworks', and in 1691, his children were ennobled, following a request by the latter's sons.

Members of the Linroth family were in the 17th century living in Värmland, where they managed ironworks in Bjurtjärn and Lungsund sockens, in present-day Storfors Municipality. A Linroth-coat of arms is preserved at the Bjurtjärn Church, and the current municipal coat of arms of Storfors was influenced by its design. The family has also donated various items to the church, where the Linroth-burial vault was built in the 1730s.

== See also ==
- List of Swedish noble families
