= Storfors =

- Urban settlement
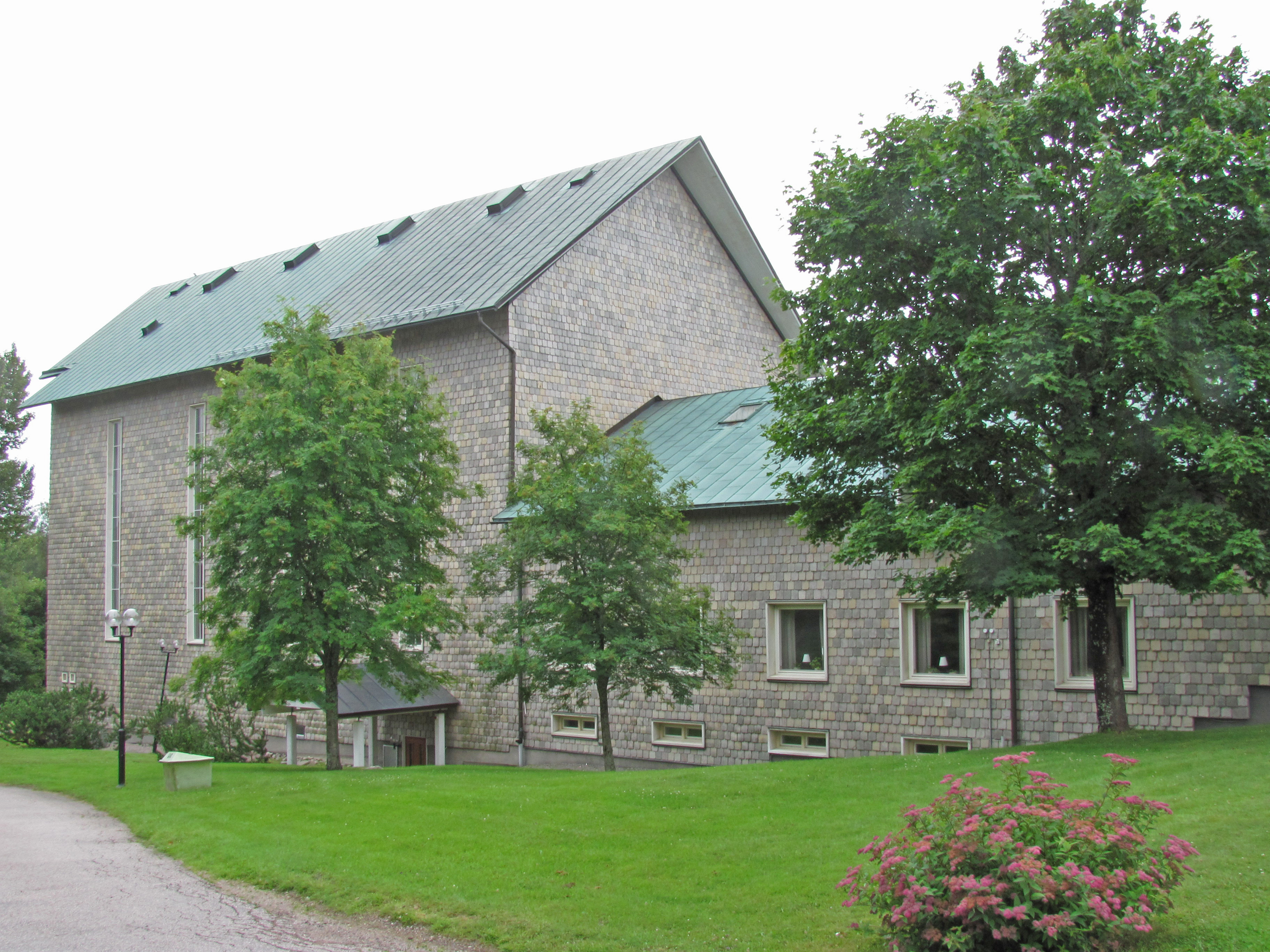
- Storfors Church

- Location within Sweden
- Coordinates: 59°32′N 14°16′E
- Country: Sweden
- Province: Värmland
- County: Värmland County
- Municipality: Storfors Municipality

Area
  - Total: 2.87 km^{2} (1.11 sq mi)

Population (31 December 2010)
  - Total: 2,337
  - Density: 815/km^{2} (2,110/sq mi)
- Time zone: UTC+1 (CET)
  - Summer (DST): UTC+2 (CEST)

Storfors is a locality and the seat of Storfors Municipality, Värmland County, Sweden with 2,337 inhabitants in 2010.

Storfors specialises in the manufacturing of heavy wall pipes in standard and special grades for large project business in the oil, gas and chemical industries. The mill at Storfors is equipped to manufacture pipe from plate up to 35 mm thick, in sizes from 139.7mm OD up to 1626 mm.

Storfors Municipality is also the home of the Lundsbergs boarding school.
