= Storfors Municipality =

Storfors Municipality Storfors kommun
- Municipality
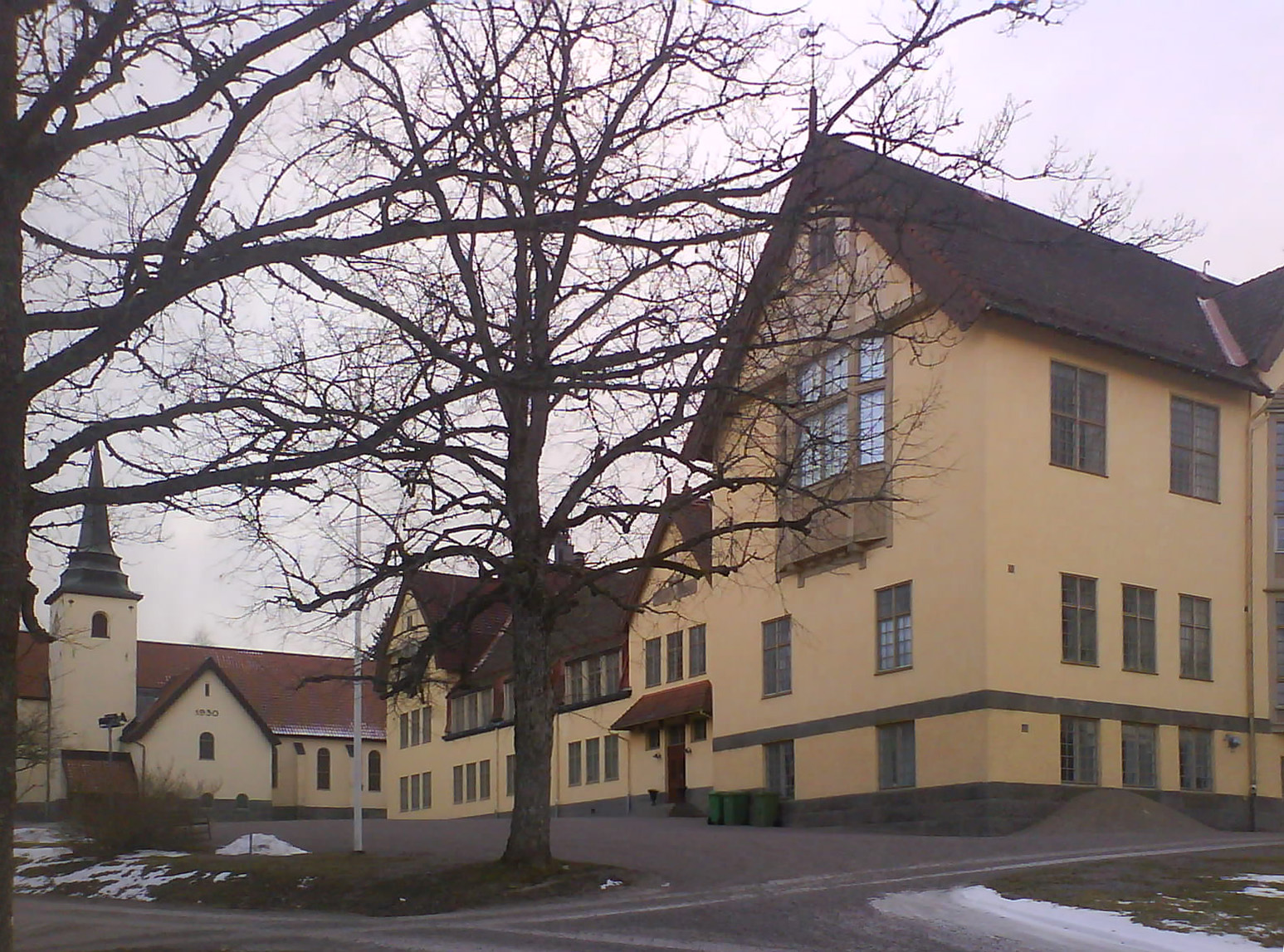
- Lundsberg

- Coat of arms

- Coordinates: 59°32′N 14°16′E
- Country: Sweden
- County: Värmland County
- Seat: Storfors

Area
  - Total: 472.71 km^{2} (182.51 sq mi)
  - Land: 391.47 km^{2} (151.15 sq mi)
  - Water: 81.24 km^{2} (31.37 sq mi)
- Area as of 1 January 2014.

Population (30 June 2025)
  - Total: 3,788
  - Density: 9.676/km^{2} (25.06/sq mi)
- Time zone: UTC+1 (CET)
  - Summer (DST): UTC+2 (CEST)
- ISO 3166 code: SE
- Province: Värmland
- Municipal code: 1760
- Website: www.storfors.se

Storfors Municipality (Swedish: Storfors kommun) is a municipality in Värmland County in west central Sweden. Its seat is located in the town of Storfors, which has approximately 2,500 inhabitants.

The first local government unit named Storfors was created in 1950 when a market town (köping) by that name was detached from Kroppa. (The rest of Kroppa is since 1971 in Filipstad Municipality.) In 1967 Ullvättern was amalgamated with Storfors, making up the present municipal territory.

Storfors is one of Sweden's least populated municipalities. The nearest city is Karlstad, approximately 50 kilometers to the west.

Several small lakes and streams offer fishing opportunities. The countryside is also suitable for other outdoor activities, including walking and hiking.

== Demographics ==
This is a demographic table based on Storfors Municipality's electoral districts in the 2022 Swedish general election sourced from SVT's election platform, in turn taken from SCB official statistics.

In total there were 3,940 inhabitants, with 3,092 Swedish citizens of voting age. 47.1% voted for the left coalition and 51.3% for the right coalition. Indicators are in percentage points except population totals and income.

Location	Residents	Citizen adults	Left vote	Right vote	Employed	Swedish parents	Foreign heritage	Income SEK	Degree
Location			%	%					
Bjurtjärn	1,192	978	40.5	57.7	83	89	11	26,328	27
Lungsund	626	520	41.6	56.0	83	89	11	25,459	24
Storfors C	2,122	1,594	53.6	45.3	71	73	27	21,501	19
Source: SVT

== See also ==
- Alkvettern Manor, 17th century
