= Krebs (surname) =

Krebs is a surname of Germanic origin of multiple origin associated with the literal meaning "crab" or "crayfish". Notable people with the surname include:

- Abbie E. Krebs-Wilkins (1842–1924), American businesswoman
- Albert Krebs (1899–1974), German Nazi Gauleiter in Hamburg in the time of the Third Reich
- Allen Krebs, Marxian economics professor who founded the Free University of New York (FUNY)
- Andreas Samuel Krebs (1766–1818), Danish-Norwegian army officer
- Angelika Krebs (born 1961), German philosopher
- Annabell Krebs Culverwell (1902–1998), AnnaBell took the name Columba when signing her paintings and writings
- Arthur Constantin Krebs (1850–1935), French officer and pioneer in automotive engineering
- Beatrice Krebs (1924–2011), American operatic mezzo-soprano, musical theatre actress, and voice teacher
- Bernt Krebs, German scientist
- Brian Krebs (born 1972), American computer security journalist
- Carl Immanuel Krebs (1889–1971), Danish doctor, humanitarianist and explorer, third child of Johanne Margrethe Busch
- Charles Joseph Krebs (born 1936), population ecologist
- Chris Krebs, American attorney and Director of the Cybersecurity and Infrastructure Security Agency
- Christopher B. Krebs, American classicist
- Clara Shafira Krebs (born 2002), Indonesian-German model, entrepreneur and beauty pageant titleholder crowned Miss Universe Indonesia 2024
- Diether Krebs (1947–2000), German actor
- Edward H. Krebs (born 1944), American politician from Pennsylvania
- Edwin G. Krebs (1918–2009), biochemist
- Elizabeth Krebs (1848–1931), American gardener, promoter of Halloween parades
- Emil Krebs (1867–1930), German polyglot and sinologist
- Eric Krebs (born 1944), American theater founder and producer
- Ernst Krebs (wrestler) (1914– unknown), Swiss wrestler
- Ernst T. Krebs (1912–1996), American chemist and promoter of purported alternative cures for cancer
- Ervin Krebs (1909–1972), Hungarian coxswain
- Florian Krebs (born 1988), German footballer
- Francis Krebs (born 1946), American Bishop of the Ecumenical Catholic Communion
- Friedrich Krebs (died 1493), German organ builder
- Friedrich Krebs (mayor), German politician from Frankfurt
- Gaëtan Krebs (born 1985), French football player
- Gene Krebs, American politician from Ohio
- Georg Ludwig Engelhard Krebs (1792–1844), German apothecary and natural history collector
- George Krebs (1872–1939), American football player and coach
- Germaine Émilie Krebs (1903–1993), fashion designer
- Hans Krebs (Wehrmacht general) (1898–1945), German general
- Hans Adolf Krebs (1900–1981), biochemist (Krebs cycle / citric acid cycle)
- Hans Krebs (SS general) (1888–1947), Moravian-born Nazi SS Brigadeführer executed for war crimes
- Helmut Krebs (1913–2007), German tenor
- Henriette Krebs (born 1985), German politician
- Henrik J. Krebs (1847–1929), Danish-born American industrialist
- Hermano Krebs, rehabilitation robotics specialist
- Jacob Krebs (1782–1847), American politician
- Jim Krebs (1935–1965), American basketball player
- Joe Krebs (1943–2021), American television news reporter
- Johann Baptist Krebs (1774–1851), German opera singer and director, vocal pedagogue, Freemason and esoteric writer
- Johann Jacob Friedrich Krebs (c.1749–1815), American fraktur artist
- Johann Ludwig Krebs (1713–1780), German composer, student of J.S. Bach
- Johann Tobias Krebs (1690–1762), composer, father of J. L.
- Johann Tobias Krebs (literary scholar) (1718–1782), scholar of classical and Hebrew literature
- Johanne Cathrine Krebs (1848–1924), Danish painter and women's rights activist
- John Hans Krebs (1926–2014), German-born California politician
- John Krebs, Baron Krebs (born 1945), scientist and Principal of Jesus College, Oxford
- John Krebs (racing driver) (1950–2023), American stock car racing driver
- John Michael Krebs (1804–1867), American Presbyterian clergyman
- Karin Krebs (née Burneleit, born 1943) East German middle-distance runner
- Mitch Krebs, American television anchor
- Martha Krebs, theoretical physicist
- Martin Krebs (born 1956), German prelate and diplomat
- Nathalie Krebs (1895–1978), Danish potter
- Nicholas of Cusa, birth name Nicholas Krebs (1401–1464), cardinal, philosopher, jurist, mathematician and astronomer
- Nina Krebs Ovesen (born 1996), Danish racing cyclist
- Otto Krebs (1873–1941), German industrialist and art collector
- Paul Joseph Krebs (1912–1996), American politician
- Paula Krebs, American business executive
- Pete Krebs, American musician, Hazel
- Peyton Krebs (born 2001), Canadian ice hockey player
- Pierre Krebs, German founder of Thule-Seminar, an extreme-right nationalist organization
- Poul Krebs (born 1956), Danish singer, songwriter and musician
- Rahel Krebs, aka Jaël Malli (born 1979), Swiss singer, Lunik
- Richard Krebs (1906–1996), German athlete
- Ricardo Krebs Wilckens (1918–2011), German Chilean historian
- Richard Julius Hermann Krebs, known as Jan Valtin, spy
- Rick Krebs (born 1949), role-playing game and simulation game designer
- Robert Krebs, railroad company president
- Rockne Krebs (1938–2011), American artist and sculptor
- Shantel Krebs (born 1973), American businesswoman and politician from South Dakota
- Sharon Krebs (1937–2008), political activist and member of the Weather Underground
- Stanley LeFevre Krebs (1864–1935), American psychologist and salesmanship lecturer
- Susan W. Krebs (born 1959), American politician from Maryland
- Thomas L. Krebs, American securities and finance attorney
- Torsten Krebs (born 1973), German sport shooter
- Valdis Krebs, American-Latvian researcher and consultant in the field of social and organizational network analysis
- Werner G. Krebs, American data scientist

== Fictional people ==
- Karl Krebs, character in Robert Harris' alternate history Fatherland
- Maynard G. Krebs, television sitcom character (The Many Loves of Dobie Gillis)
- Main character of Ernest Hemingway's story "Soldier's Home"
- Krauser Krebs in Back at the Barnyard

== See also ==
- Kreps
