= Krebs =

Krebs is the German and Danish word for "crab" and "cancer" (in German, both the zodiac sign and the disease; in Danish the latter is "kræft"). It may refer to:

== Places ==
- Krebs Formation, a geologic formation in Missouri
- Krebs Group, a geologic group in Oklahoma, preserving fossils dating back to the Carboniferous period
- Krebs, Oklahoma, a city in Pittsburg County, Oklahoma, nicknamed "Little Italy"
- Krebs-see, a lake in Kreis Herzogtum Lauenburg, Schleswig-Holstein, Germany
- Mount Krebs, a 1,630 metres rock peak, in the ridge of Lillie Range, near the foothills of the Prince Olav Mountains, Antarctica
- Krebs Ridge, on the east coast of Palmer Land, Antarctica

== Organizations ==
- Krebs Commercial Car Company, a motor company and military trucks manufacturer, active from 1917 to 1939 in Clyde, Ohio
- Germaine Emilie Krebs (or Grès), French haute couture fashion house
- Krebs Pigments and Chemical Company, a manufacturer of lithopone and titanium dioxide founded in 1902 by Henrik J. Krebs
- Krebs School, a private school located in Stockholmsgade in Copenhagen, Denmark

== Other uses ==
- Krebs (surname)
- Krebs's fat mouse (Steatomys krebsii), a species of rodent in the family Nesomyidae
- Krebs cycle, a biochemical system important for the metabolism of sugars and fats
- Krebs–Henseleit solution, developed by Hans Krebs and Kurt Henseleit
- Krebs, was an armed German trawler that was sunk in 1941 in Operation Claymore
- Sir Hans Krebs Lecture and Medal, annually award by the Federation of European Biochemical Societies (FEBS)

== See also ==
- Krab (disambiguation)
- Crab (disambiguation)
- Krebs House (disambiguation)

Related surnames

- Kreps (disambiguation)
