= Hans Krebs =

Hans Krebs is the name of:

- Hans Krebs (SS general) (1888–1947), German-Czech politician and Nazi Party Gauleiter
- Hans Krebs (Wehrmacht general) (1898–1945), last German Army chief of staff during World War II
- Hans Krebs (biochemist) (1900–1981), German-born British physician and biochemist

== See also ==
- John Hans Krebs (1926–2014), German-born American legislator and politician
- Krebs (surname)
