= The Institute for Music Aesthetics =

- Type: Public
- Established: 1967
- Head: Andreas Dorschel
- Total staff: ca. 8
- Location: Graz, Styria, Austria
- Website: musikaesthetik.kug.ac.at//

The Institute for Music Aesthetics, founded in 1967 as the "Institute for Valuation Research", is an institution of the University of Music and Performing Arts Graz. As the only institute of its kind in the German-speaking area, it is specifically dedicated to the philosophical exploration of musical phenomena.

== Concept ==
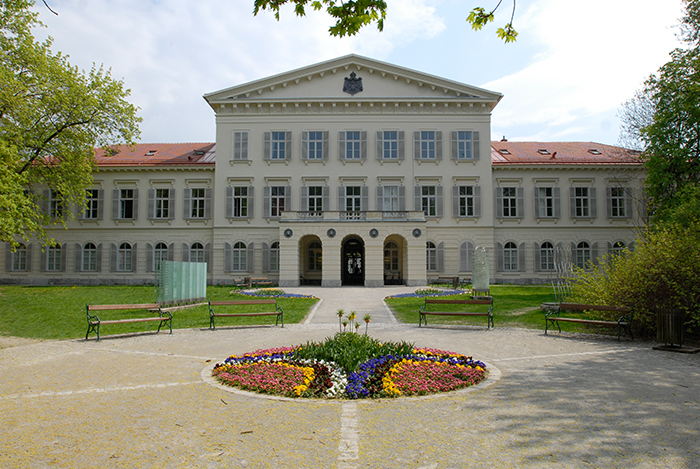
The Palais Meran, seat of the Institute for Music Aesthetics

The institute promotes and conducts research and teaching in the field of music aesthetics. The field of music aesthetics concentrates on fundamental premises that underlie musical theory, practice, and the perception of music—for instance, form, structure, content, time, expression, understanding, or interpretation. Music aesthetics is conceived of as a philosophical endeavour that is both historically situated and relevant to present contexts. Typically, music aesthetics proceeds in an interdisciplinary manner, making the conceptual richness of the philosophical tradition interact with empirical approaches to music.

== History ==
=== Kaufmann Era ===
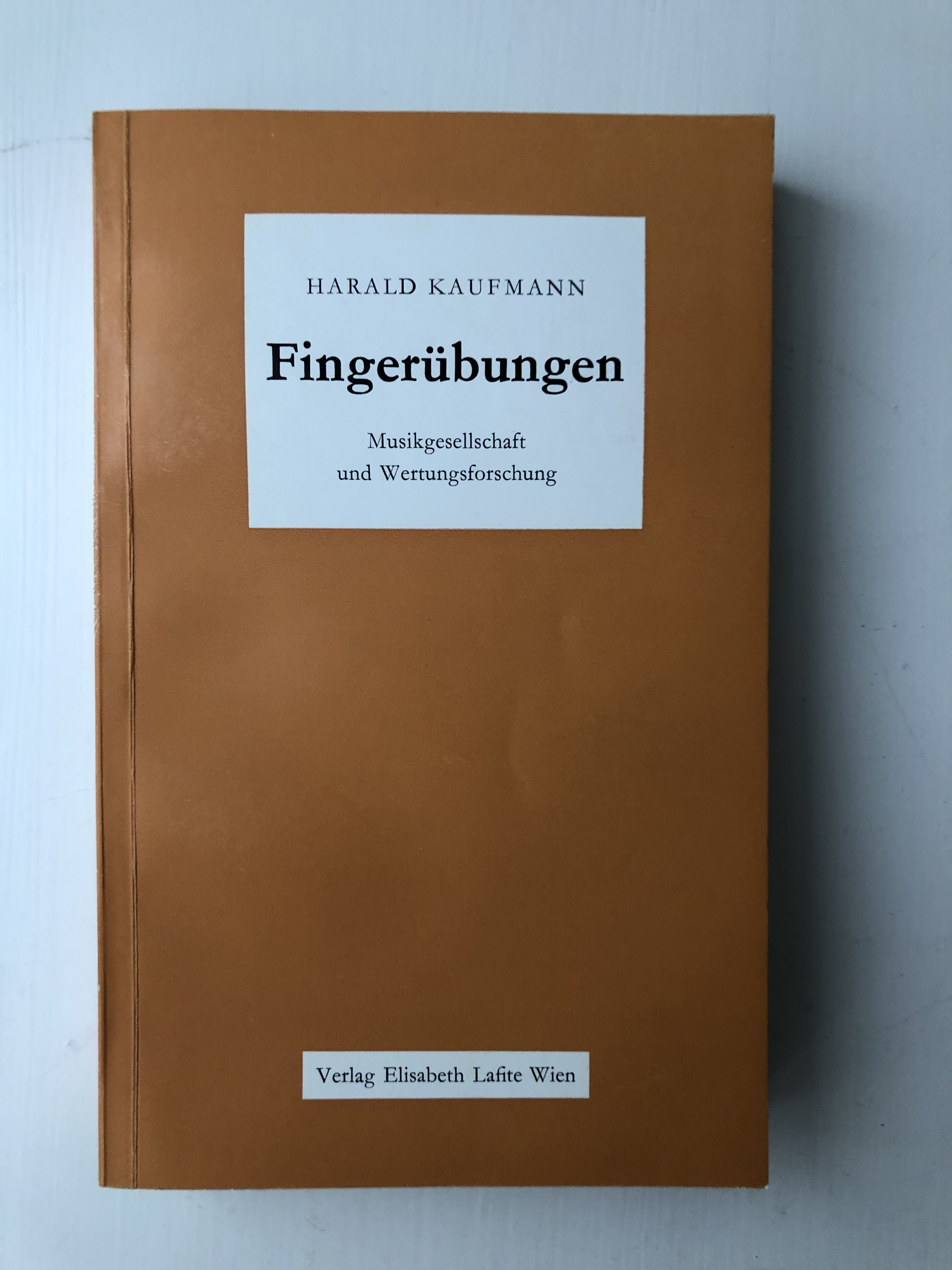
Harald Kaufmann, Fingerübungen (1970)

The Institute for Music Aesthetics was founded on September 29, 1967, as the "Institute for Valuation Research" at the then Academy for Music and Performing Arts in Graz. Initially, it was planned as an "Institute for Cultural Journalism". The academy appointed Harald Kaufmann, who had conceived the institute in 1966, as its first head.

At the symposium in the founding year of 1967 Theodor W. Adorno (who held Kaufmann in high regard) gave a keynote address. Kaufmann programmatically outlined a concept for the new research facility in two of his publications (Spurlinien. Analytische Aufsätze über Sprache und Musik and Fingerübungen. 'Musikgesellschaft und Wertungsforschung) and exemplarily applied its principles in case studies.

The Saarbrücken musicologist Werner Braun characterized Kaufmann's program as follows: "Modern 'valuation research' is about illuminating as many hidden premises as possible for the 'anticipatory' aesthetic judgement. Harald Kaufmann, the head of the Graz institute set up for this purpose, wants to use tests to expose the chains of association and relations, and thus track down the 'group norms'".

From December 16 to 19, 1969, György Ligeti taught a course 'about avant-garde Composition Techniques and the Identification of Criteria' at the institute.

On June 1, 1970, Kaufmann was diagnosed with septic pleuropneumonia. On June 29, 1970, he was appointed full university professor by resolution of the Federal President of the Republic of Austria, Franz Jonas. Kaufmann died on July 9, 1970, at the age of 42 in Graz.

=== Kolleritsch Era ===
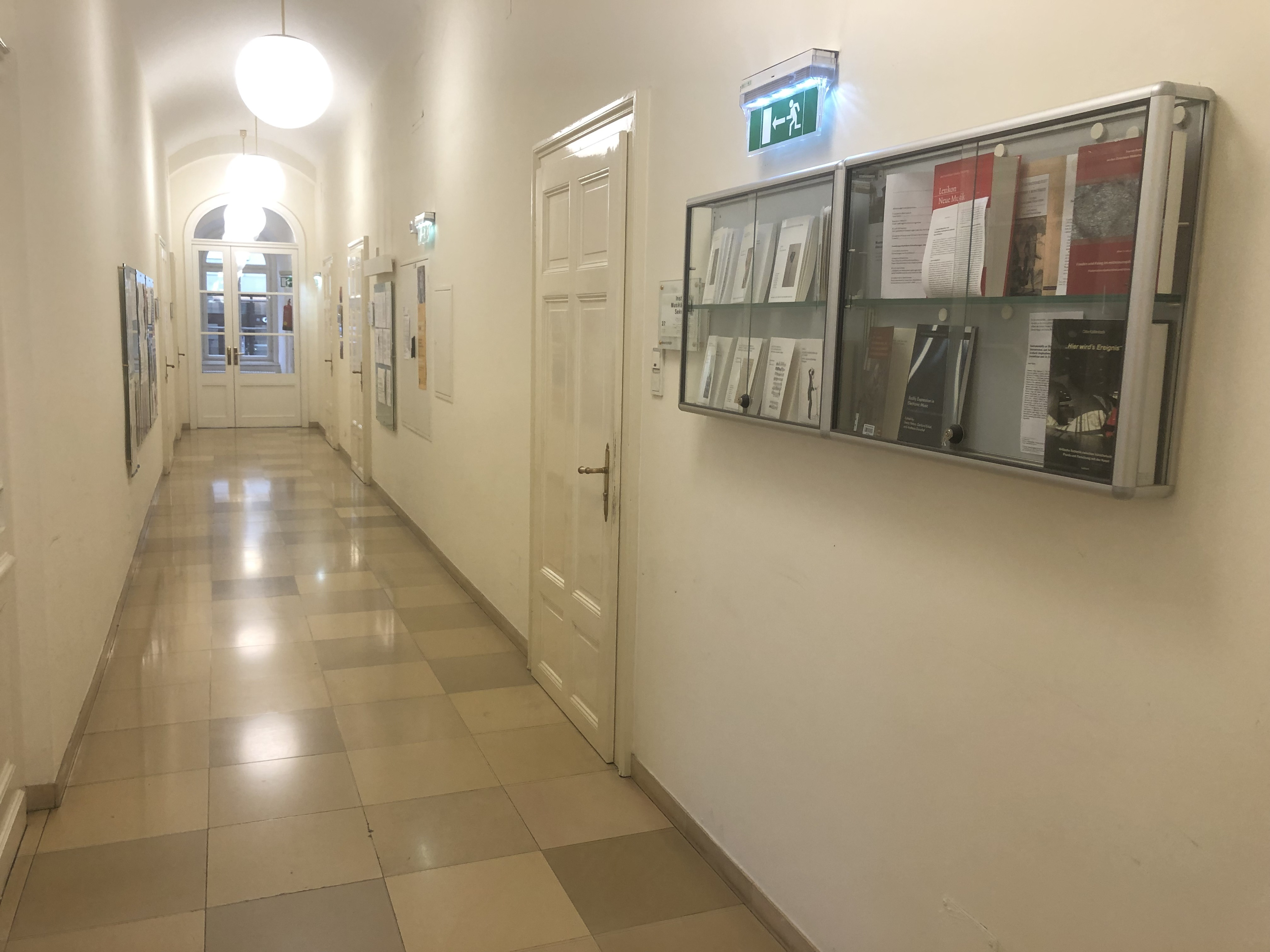
South wing of Palais Meran, Graz

After Kaufmann's sudden death in 1970, Otto Kolleritsch (1934 – 2023) took over the directorate of the institute in the same year and held that position until his retirement in 2002. In the Kolleritsch era, the institute was moved from Palais Saurau to the south wing of Palais Meran.

During this period, the opportunity arose to link the symposia to the "Steirischer Herbst" (international festival of contemporary art in Graz). This required a thematic coordination with the avant-garde festival's "Musikprotokoll" concert series (founded by Peter Vujica and Emil Breisach).

In terms of the institute’s line of inquiry, Kolleritsch shifted its focus towards the history of reception. During the 1990s, he linked this approach with discussions of modernism and postmodernism, booming at the time in cultural studies.

Kolleritsch excluded the methods of empirical social research favoured by Kaufmann and limited the procedures of the institute's work to those cultivated by the humanities and cultural studies. Value analysis was replaced by (partly rather intuitive) valuation.

As Harald Kaufmannʼs ideas were pushed into the background, Erika Kaufmann, his widow and heiress, transferred his estate from Graz to the archive of the Academy of Arts Berlin. A Festschrift to honour Kolleritsch's work was published in tribute to his 60th birthday. According to the theologian and musician Johann Trummer (1940 – 2019), Kolleritsch’s achievements culminate in an "unsurpassable life’s work".

=== Dorschel Era ===
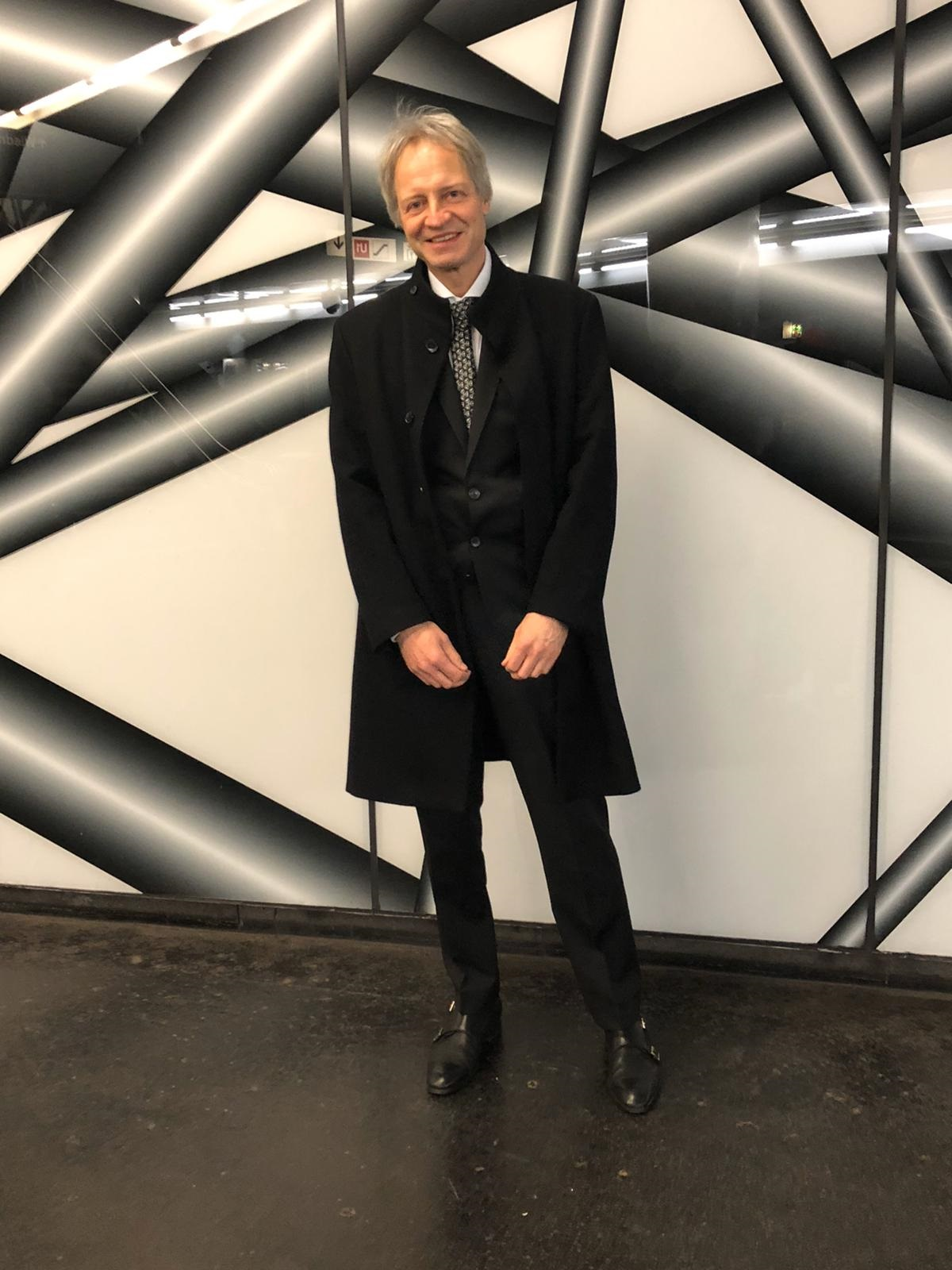
Andreas Dorschel, Vienna 2019

In autumn 2001, the institute's professorship was advertised internationally for the first time.

From 2002 on, Andreas Dorschel, who was appointed professor, (together with Federico Celestini) has given the institute a more philosophical orientation. Since the term "valuation research" had not been accepted as the name of a research discipline in four decades, Dorschel decided to rename the institution "Institute for Music Aesthetics" (since 2007). Nevertheless, Harald Kaufmann's legacy regained relevance at the institute. At the same time, the institute has opened up its research projects to the international discussion, particularly in the Anglo-Saxon world. In May 2019, the Institute for Music Aesthetics, together with the Institute for Ethnomusicology at the University of Music and Performing Arts Graz, organized an international symposium on the (ethnographically) comparative aesthetics of music.

A European group of experts stated in 2018 that the Institute for Music Aesthetics had developed into an "internationally unique flagship institution" in its field during the 2010s. In addition to scientific research, which forms the basis of the institute's work, journalistic aspects have been incorporated in the form of reviews and essays for non-academic journals such as Lettre International.

== Research Projects ==
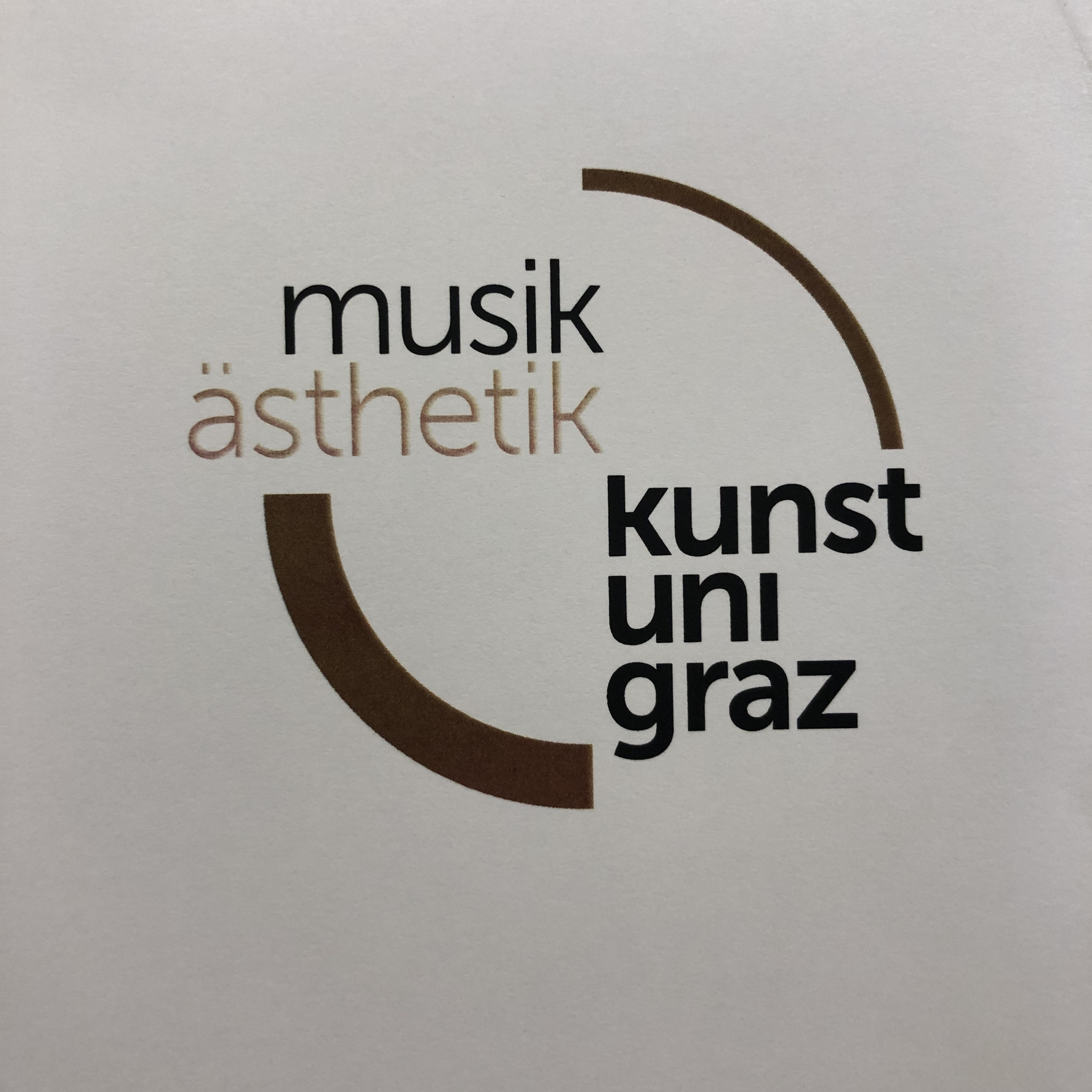
Institute logo (2017)

The Institute for Music Aesthetics hosted (or hosts) the following research projects funded by the Austrian Science Fund:

- P 25061-G15 What and How Does Music Express? Integrating Music Philosophy and Musical Analysis. FWF project to research the idea of musical expression and its analysis. Duration: 2013–2019 (Andreas Dorschel/Deniz Peters)
- AR 188 Emotional Improvisation. FWF/PEEK-Project on the question of how harmonious interaction ("togetherness") unfolds in improvisations. Duration: 2014–2019 (Deniz Peters)
- AR 259-G21 TransCoding: From ‚Highbrow Art‘ to Participatory Culture. FWF/PEEK-Project on the possibilities of expanding participation in contemporary music with artistic claims through social media. Duration: 2015–2018 (Barbara Lüneburg/Kai Ginkel)
- M 2072-G26 Music as Life-Affirmation. FWF project to research the role of music in the philosophy of life in its historical context and in its possible current significance. Duration: 2016–2018 (Manos Perrakis/Andreas Dorschel)
- P 34449-G The Epistemic Power of Music. FWF project on the question how knowledge enters music and how it emerges from it. Duration: 2021– (Andreas Dorschel/Férdia Stone-Davis)

== Studien zur Wertungsforschung [Studies on Valuation Research] ==
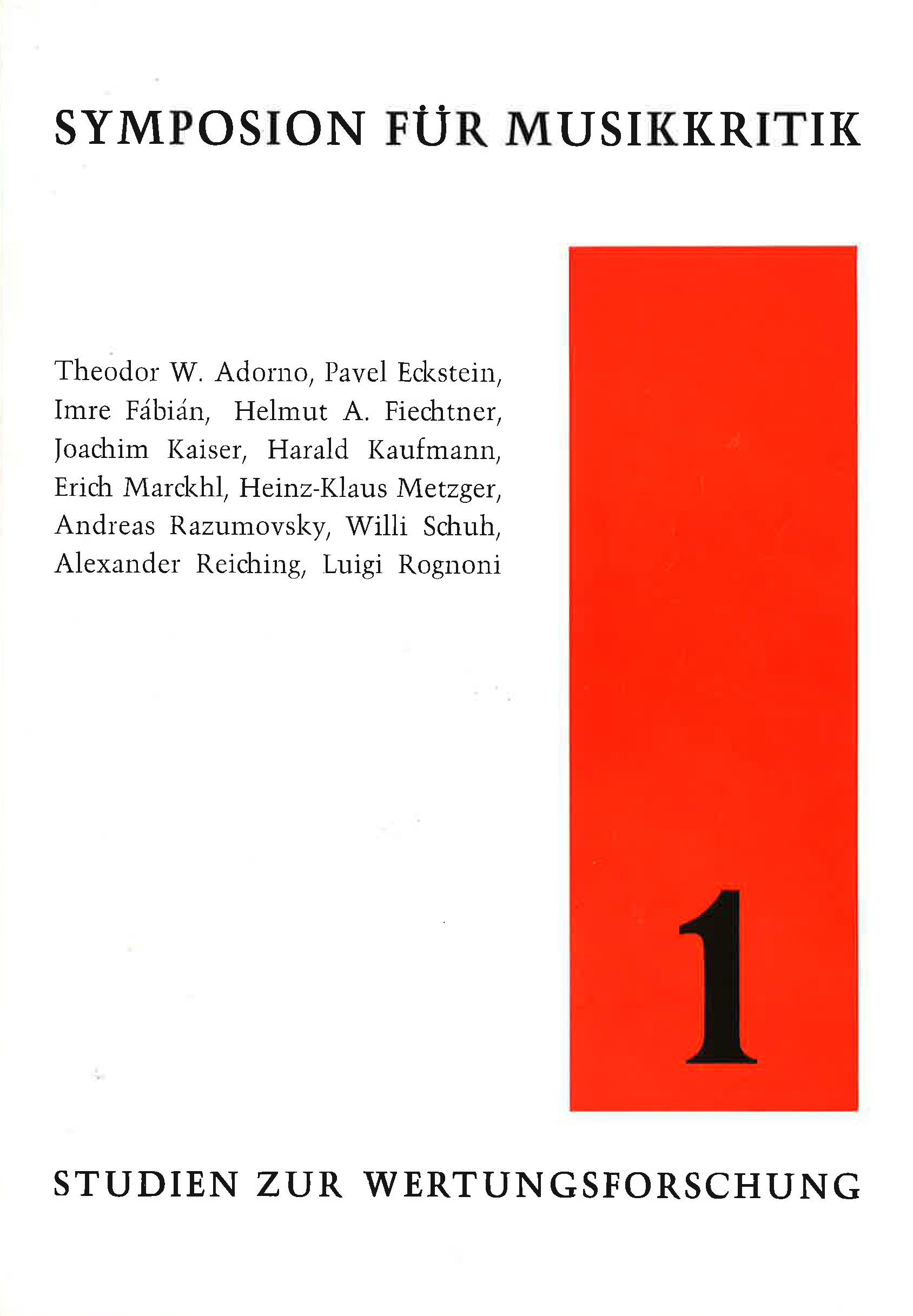
Studien zur Wertungsforschung Volume 1, 1968

The studies on valuation research, founded by Harald Kaufmann in 1968, is the most long-standing book series specifically dedicated to music aesthetics in the German-speaking world. It is published by Universal Edition (Vienna/London/New York, NY), Austria's only international music publisher.

== Bibliography (alphabetically) ==
- Andreas Dorschel: Arbeit am Kanon. Ästhetische Studien zur Musik von Haydn bis Webern. Universal Edition, Vienna – London – New York, NY 2010 (Studien zur Wertungsforschung 51) (together with Federico Celestini)
- Andreas Dorschel: Vollkommenes hält sich fern. Ästhetische Näherungen. Universal Edition, Vienna – London – New York, NY 2012 (Studien zur Wertungsforschung 53) (together with Philip Alperson)
- Harald Kaufmann: Spurlinien. Analytische Aufsätze über Sprache und Musik. Lafite, Vienna 1969
- Harald Kaufmann: Fingerübungen. Musikgesellschaft und Wertungsforschung. Lafite, Vienna 1970
- Otto Kolleritsch: Hier wird’s Ereignis. Kritische Ästhetik zwischen künstlerischer Praxis und Forschung mit der Kunst. Leykam, Graz 2014.
