= Modern Language Association =

US professional association for language and literature scholars

- Modern Language Association of America
- Abbreviation: MLA
- Formation: 1883; 143 years ago
- Founder: Aaron Marshall Elliott
- Type: Learned society
- Headquarters: New York City, U.S.
- Fields: Language; literature
- President: Tina Lu
- Executive director: Paula M. Krebs
- Website: mla.org

The Modern Language Association of America, often referred to as the Modern Language Association (MLA), is widely considered the principal professional association in the United States for scholars of language and literature. The MLA aims to "strengthen the study and teaching of language and literature". The organization includes over 20,000 members in 100 countries, primarily academic scholars, professors, and graduate students who study or teach language and literature, including English, other modern languages, and comparative literature. Although founded in the United States, with offices in New York City, the MLA's membership, concerns, reputation, and influence are international in scope.

== History ==
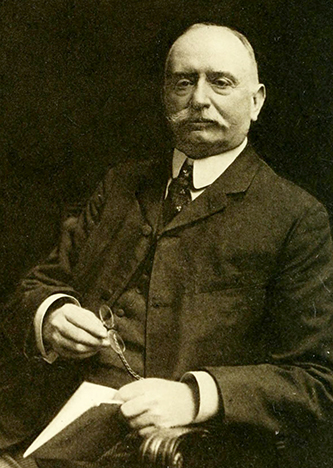
Aaron Marshall Elliott has been credited with founding the Modern Language Association.

The MLA was founded in 1883, as a discussion and advocacy group for the study of literature and modern languages (that is, all but classical languages, such as ancient Latin and Greek). According to its profile featured by the American Council of Learned Societies (ACLS), "The Modern Language Association is formed for educational, scientific, literary, and social objects and purposes, and more specifically for the promotion of the academic and scientific study of English, German, French, Spanish, Italian, and other so-called modern languages and literatures."

== Officers and governance ==
The officers of the MLA are elected by its members. Currently, the president is Tina Lu until 2026, at which point another election will be held.

The MLA is governed by an Executive Council, elected periodically by its members, according to the MLA Constitution. The Executive Director is Paula Krebs.

== Activities ==
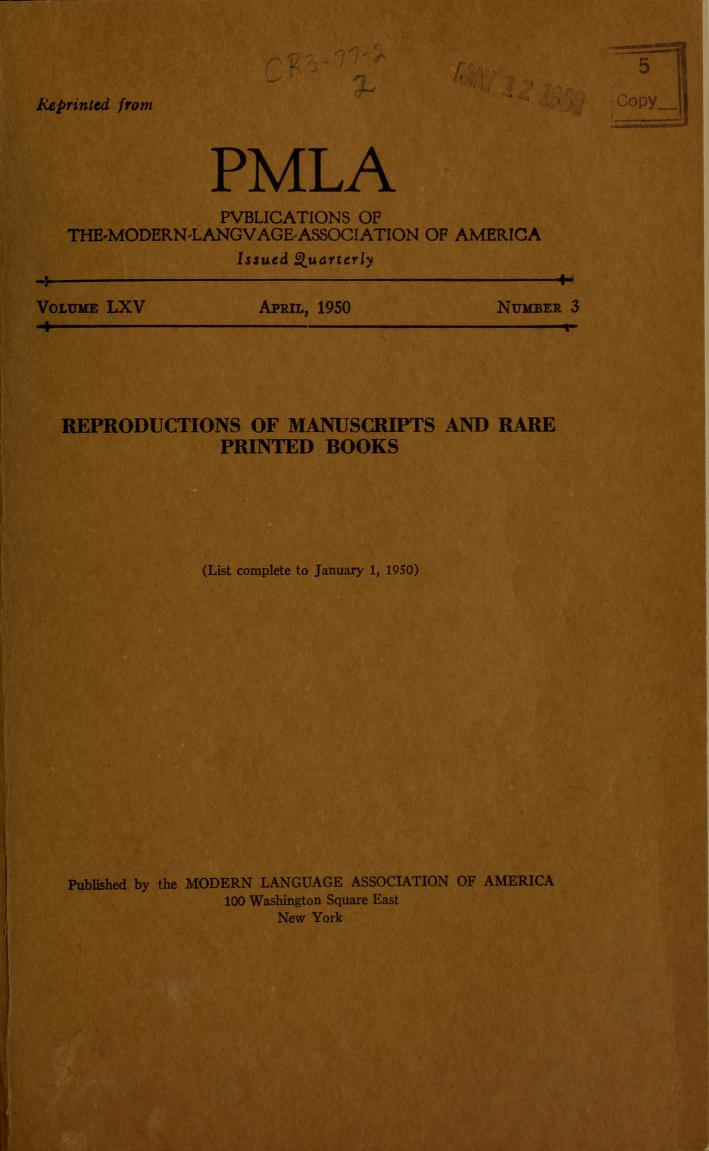
Cover of Publications of the Modern Language Association of America issue from 1950

The MLA publishes several academic journals, including Publications of the Modern Language Association of America, one of the most prestigious journals in literary studies, and Profession, which is now published online on MLA Commons and discusses professional issues faced by teachers of language and literature. The association also publishes the MLA Handbook, a guide that is geared toward high school and undergraduate students and has sold more than 6,500,000 copies. The MLA produces the online database, MLA International Bibliography, the standard bibliography in language and literature.

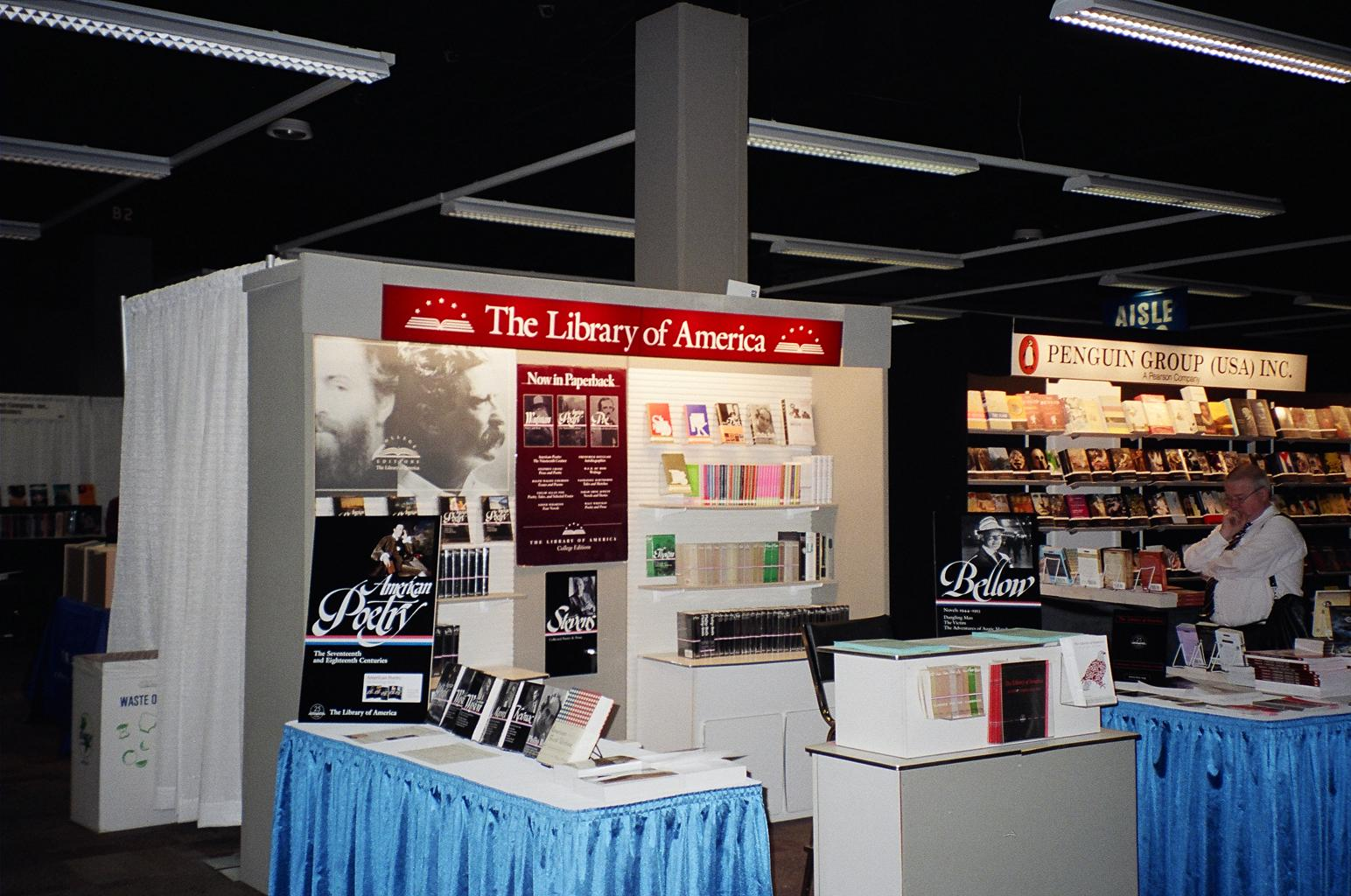
Exhibit hall booths at MLA 2007 convention in Chicago

Since 1884 the MLA has held a national, four-day convention. For many years it was held the last week in December. Beginning in 2011, the convention dates moved to the first Thursday following 2 January. Approximately eight to twelve thousand members attend, depending on the location, which alternates among major cities in various regions of the United States. The MLA Annual Convention is the largest and most important of the year for scholars of languages and literature. Language departments of many universities and colleges interview candidates for teaching positions at the convention, although hiring occurs all year long. The organization's Job Information List (JIL) is available online.

In addition to its job-placement activities, the convention features about 800 sessions, including presentations of papers and panel discussions on diverse topics (special sessions, forums, poetry readings, film presentations, interdisciplinary studies involving art and music, governance meetings) and social events hosted by English and language departments and allied or affiliated organizations. There are also extensive book exhibits in one of the main hotel or convention center exhibition areas.

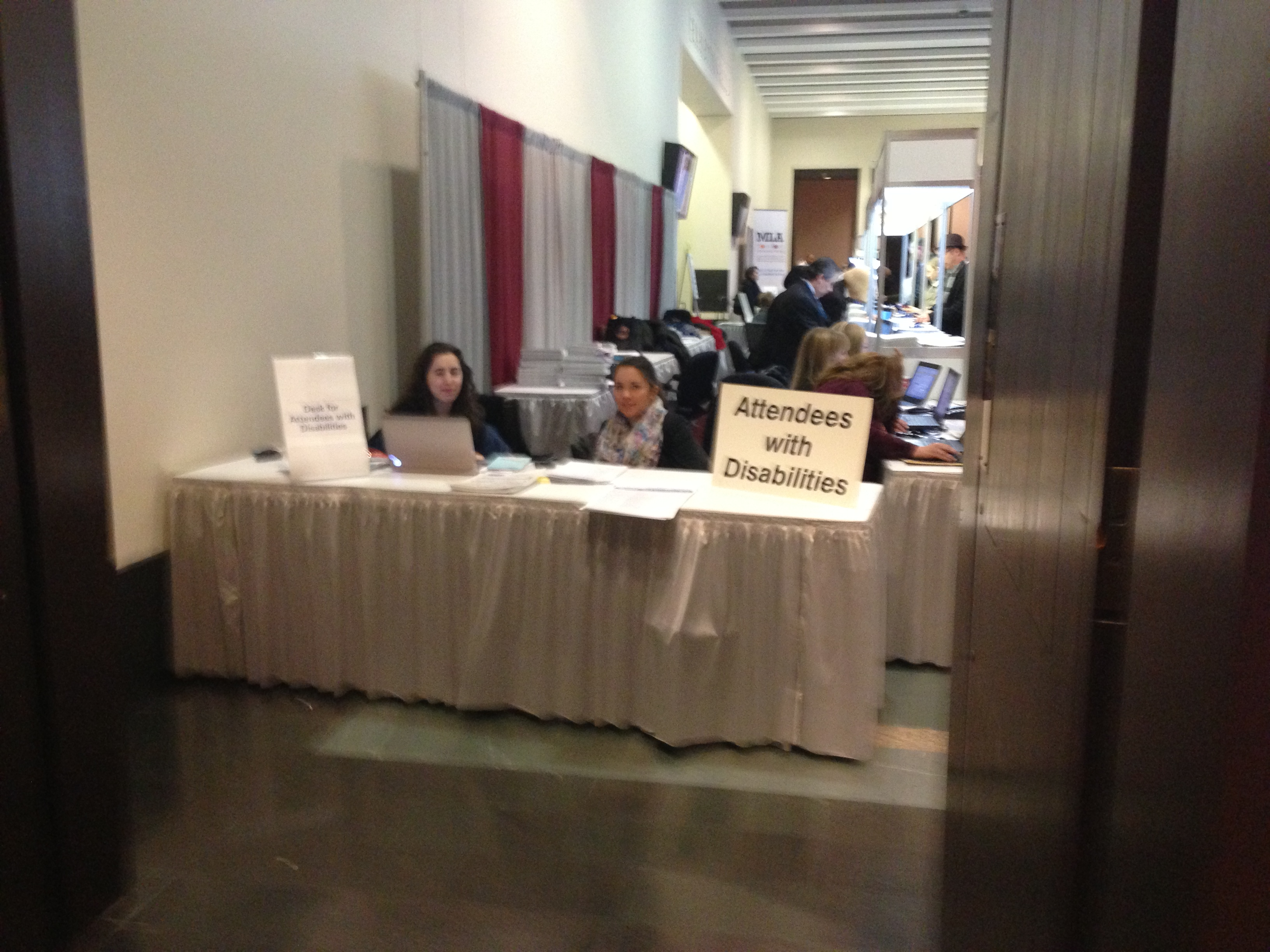
Table for attendees with disabilities, at MLA 2013 in Boston

In November 2016, the association launched Humanities Commons, an open-access, crossdisciplinary hub for anyone interested in humanities research and scholarship. Other not-for-profit organizations involved in this project include College Art Association; Association for Jewish Studies; and the Association for Slavic, East European, and Eurasian Studies.

The MLA's Web site features the MLA Language Map, which presents overviews and detailed data from the United States 2000 Census about the locations and numbers of speakers of thirty languages and seven groups of less commonly spoken languages in the United States and Canada.

The association has highlighted issues such as race, gender and class in its professional deliberations. In The New Criterion, a classicist and politically conservative magazine, Roger Kimball and Hilton Kramer argued that this was part of a "rampant politicization of literary study that the MLA has aggressively supported" in American colleges and universities, including elevating popular culture to a position of parity with great works of literature as subjects for classroom study, and other "radical" postures.

=== Resolutions ===
In June 2014, the Modern Language Association (MLA) announced that a resolution critical of Israel's restrictions on academic travel had failed to gain approval. Although the measure was debated at the association's annual convention, an overwhelming majority of members declined to participate in the subsequent vote, preventing the resolution from advancing.

During the convention, several controversial remarks were made in support of the resolution, including assertions that "this resolution rightly targets only Israel given the humongous influence that Jewish scholars have in the decision‑making process of academia in general," allegations that a pro‑Israel cabal was funding opposition, and one individual's description of opponents as "Zionist attack dogs."

Concerns about such rhetoric were raised by members of the association. Professor Martin Shichtman, director of Jewish Studies at Eastern Michigan University and an organizer of MLA Members for Scholars' Rights, described the comments as "atypical among hundreds" but nonetheless alarming. Professor Cary Nelson, a member of the MLA for nearly five decades, similarly observed that "many of us felt that there was a real antisemitic flavor about the comments." Nelson recalled that "people complained that 'outsiders' damaged the debate, asking where the money came from, accusing it of being part of the Jewish lobby with foreign money poured into the opposition." He described the comments as "disturbing,".

The World Jewish Congress also condemned the resolution, describing it as "one-sided" and "biased". WJC‑US chairman Rabbi Joel H. Meyers argued that the measure held Israel to a "double standard" and ignored its security concerns, while WJC president Ronald S. Lauder accused supporters of the bill of "Orwellian anti-Semitism and moral bankruptcy".

On January 7, 2017, the MLA rejected a proposed boycott of Israeli academic institutions in a 113–79 vote during its annual meeting in Philadelphia. Activists within the association had since 2014 advocated for such a measure, arguing that Israel's policies constituted human rights violations and should be subject to a boycott similar to that imposed on apartheid South Africa. The proposal drew on the Boycott, Divestment and Sanctions (BDS) movement, which calls for comprehensive boycotts of Israel.

The resolution was introduced in December 2016 by members identifying as MLA Members for Justice in Palestine. The call to boycott received support from scholars such as Judith Butler and novelist Viet Thanh Nguyen, but also opposition from scholars such as Cary Nelson and historian Kenneth Waltzer as well as a group calling itself MLA Members for Scholars Rights. Israeli academics also expressed divergent views: a group of scholars sent videotaped messages stating Israeli universities are multicultural and calling the BDS campaign one of harassment and slander, while others endorsed the boycott, contending that opposition efforts diverted attention from conditions faced by Palestinians.

On May 11, 2018, Judith Butler authored and assembled a group of faculty in writing a letter to New York University following the sexual harassment suit filed by a former NYU graduate student against his advisor Avital Ronell. Despite the signatories having acknowledged not having had access to the confidential findings of the investigation that followed the Title IX complaint against Ronell, they nonetheless accused the complainant of waging a "malicious campaign" against Ronell. The signatories also wrote that the presumed "malicious intention has animated and sustained this legal nightmare" for a highly regarded scholar. "If she were to be terminated or relieved of her duties, the injustice would be widely recognized and opposed." Butler invoked their title as President Elect of the Modern Language Association. Butler received wide condemnation and calls to resign her position as MLA president. The MLA Executive Council released a statement regarding then letter, saying "The letter, written without authorization from the Executive Council, runs counter to aspects of the MLA's Statement of Professional Ethics." Ronell was found guilty of sexual harassment and suspended for a year.

The Louis D. Brandeis Center for Human Rights Under Law warned that adoption of the resolution could prompt legal action, arguing in a letter addressed to the association's President Kwame Anthony Appiah and Executive Director Rosemary G. Feal, the center claimed that the resolution was ultra vires. That is, that it would take the association in a direction that went beyond its original mission. Supporters of the boycott argued that it was not ultra vires because the Association had in the past been engaged in human rights issues.

At the 2025 annual meeting in New Orleans, the MLA executive council blocked a member vote on a resolution endorsing BDS and acknowledging Palestinian genocide accusation and referenced an allegation of scholasticide, prompting protest and campaign for members to lapse membership in the organization. The executive council released a statement in advance stating that while they are "appalled by the continued attack on Gaza," a BDS resolution would present "legal and fiduciary" challenges.

== Regional associations ==
There are several regional associations that are independent of the primary MLA, and which host smaller conventions at other times of the year:

- Midwest Modern Language Association
- Northeast Modern Language Association
- Pacific Ancient and Modern Language Association
- Rocky Mountain Modern Language Association
- South Atlantic Modern Language Association
- South Central Modern Language Association

== Affiliated and allied societies ==
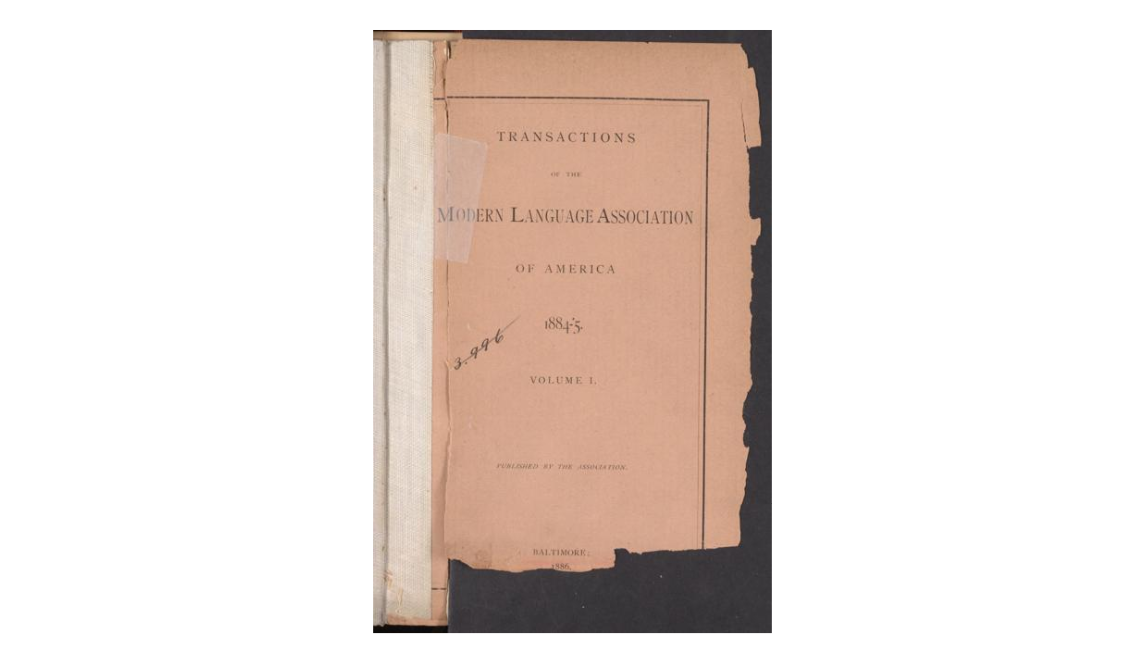
Cover of Transactions and Proceedings of the Modern Language Association of America 1884–5

- Association of Departments of English
- Association of Departments of Foreign Languages
- Society for Medieval Feminist Scholarship
- The International Federation for Modern Languages and Literatures (FILLM)

== See also ==
- List of most commonly learned foreign languages in the United States
- MLA Handbook
- MLA Style Manual
- Style guide
