= Zeno (periodical) =

- Discipline: Philosophy; Literature
- Language: German
- Edited by: Gerd Brudermüller; Jakob Ossner; Michael Rumpf; Joachim Vahland

Publication details
- History: 1980–present
- Publisher: Universitätsverlag Rhein-Ruhr (UVRR) (Germany)
- Frequency: annual

Standard abbreviations
- ISO 4: Zeno

Indexing
- ISSN: 1436-1922

Links
- Journal homepage

Zeno is the single German-language periodical devoted specifically to work at the intersection of philosophy and literature, featuring essays, reviews, stories and poems. Since 1980, it has been published annually by Rhine-Ruhr University Press (Universitätsverlag Rhein-Ruhr | UVRR).

== Name ==
The periodical's name refers to the ancient philosophers Zeno of Elea (c. 490 – 430 BCE), the presocratic, and Zeno of Kition (c. 333/332 – 262/261 BCE), the Stoic.

== Editors ==
Zeno is edited by Gerd Brudermüller, Jakob Ossner, Michael Rumpf und Joachim Vahland. Until his death in 2011, Wolfgang Marx, professor of philosophy at the University of Bonn, served as co-editor.

== Topic foci ==
Recent issues of Zeno were devoted to the following topics:

- 2017 | no. 37: Tolerance
- 2016 | no. 36: Conflicts
- 2015 | no. 35: Identity II
- 2014 | no. 34: More or Less
- 2013 | no. 33: Identity I
- 2012 | no. 32: Equality
- 2011 | no. 31: Values
- 2010 | no. 30: Individuals

== Authors ==
Among authors who have published in Zeno are Andreas Dorschel, Wilhelm Genazino, Panagiotis Kondylis, Helmut Krausser, Brigitte Kronauer, Günter Kunert, Reiner Kunze and Gabriele Wohmann. The periodical has also re-published texts by, i.a., Henri-Frédéric Amiel, Gustav Theodor Fechner, Walter Savage Landor, Paul Léautaud, Antonio Machado, Heinrich Rickert, Marcel Schwob, Walter Serner and Georg Simmel.
