= Martha Krebs =

Theoretical physicist

- Born: Atlantic City, New Jersey
- Education: Catholic University of America
- Occupation: Physicist
- Spouse: Philip E Coyle III
- Children: 4

Martha Krebs is a theoretical physicist who directed the Office of Science for the United States Department of Energy from 1993 to 2000. She later went on to be the founding director for the University of California, Los Angeles's California NanoSystems Institute.

== Early life and education ==
Martha Krebs was born in Atlantic City, New Jersey. Krebs graduated summa cum laude at the Catholic University of America in 1966 with a bachelor's degree in physics. In 1975 she completed her PhD in theoretical physics, specializing in statistical mechanics at the same university.

Krebs is part of the American Physical Society, the American Association for the Advancement of Science, and the Association for Women in Science. She is also a member of Phi Beta Kappa Society.

== Career ==
Krebs served as a member on the House Committee on Science, from 1977 through 1983. She started as a professional staff member before later becoming the subcommittee staff director. She left the committee in 1983 to become an associate director of Planning and Development for the United States Department of Energy at the Lawrence Berkeley National Laboratory. While working at the lab Krebs's role was to plan research, oversee science education and handle outreach.

Krebs switched jobs in 1993, and worked for seven years in the United States Department of Energy and the Office of Science. She was the assistant secretary and the director of the Office of Science at the Department of Energy, and was responsible for managing the $3.1 billion budget. One of her major accomplishments while working for the department was to oversee the completion of the main injector for the particle accelerator at Fermilab.

Krebs stepped down in 2000 to work on research and development management, planning and budgeting for the Institute for Defence Studies and Analyses. In 2001 she became the founding director for California NanoSystems Institute at University of California, Los Angeles. From 2005 to 2009 Krebs was the deputy director for research and development at the California Energy Commission. In 2013 she was appointed senior scientist at Penn State College of Engineering and director of the energy efficient buildings hub at the Philadelphia Naval Shipyard.

== See also ==
- Women in physics
- Women in government
