= Paula Krebs =

Paula Krebs is the Executive Director of the Modern Language Association of America (MLA), the largest organization of scholars of languages and literature in the United States. She was previously a professor of English at Wheaton College. From 2012 to 2017, she served as the dean of the College of Humanities and Social Sciences at Bridgewater State University.

Krebs received her bachelor's of arts degree in English and Women's Studies from La Salle University in 1980. She received her Ph.D. in English from Indiana University in 1992.

Before arriving at Bridgewater State, Krebs was a special assistant to the president at Wheaton College; an American Council on Education Fellow in the president’s office of the University of Massachusetts; and a professor and department chair at Wheaton. She has also been a regular contributor to higher education publications, and she writes a column for the Chronicle of Higher Education’s blog Vitae.
