= Johann Tobias Krebs (literary scholar) =

German literary scholar

Johann Tobias Krebs (16 December 1718, Buttstädt – 6 April 1782, Grimma) was a German scholar of classical literature and Hebrew literature. He wrote Decreta Romanorum pro Judaeis facta e Iosepho collecta et commentario historico-grammatico-critico illustrata, based on Josephus. He was also an editor of Hesiod (1746).

He was rector of Grimma. He was a pupil of Johann August Ernesti.
