= Valdis Krebs =

Valdis Krebs is an American-Latvian researcher, author, and consultant in the field of social and organizational network analysis. He is the founder and chief scientist of OrgNet, LLC, and the creator of InFlow software, which in 2008 Wired Magazine called one of the most advanced tools for analyzing and visualizing networks. Military.com's DefenseTech blog has called him a leading authority in the field.

== Work highlights ==
After the September 11 attacks, Krebs used public information and newspaper clippings to produce a partial map of the organization behind the attacks. The resulting paper, Uncloaking Terrorist Networks, has been called a classic, and "likely the most cited public analysis of the 9/11 network." After publishing it, he was "invited to Washington to brief intelligence contractors."

Since 2004 Krebs has periodically published infographics showing the political polarization of American book-buying patterns. He has claimed that the web leads people to narrower, more extreme viewpoints (similar to the "bubble effect"), and suggests cultivating diversity in social networks, a process he calls "network weaving".

Krebs has used social network maps to provide evidence of corruption, help a non-profit group prosecute a slumlord conspiracy, and visualize the "ecosystem" of fraud in the Bernie Madoff Ponzi scheme scandal. He has also consulted for corporate clients including IBM and Google.
