= Elizabeth Krebs =

American originator of the Halloween parade

- Born: November 14, 1848; Bern, Switzerland
- Died: August 19, 1931 (aged 82); Hiawatha, Kansas

Elizabeth Oehler Krebs (November 14, 1848 – August 19, 1931) was an American woman credited with organizing the first Halloween party, shifting the American holiday from one full of children's' mischief to one with costumes and parades.

Krebs was born Elizabeth Oehler in Bern, Switzerland. Her family moved to the United States in 1855. She was orphaned as a teenager. In 1870 she married John Krebs and they had four children. Krebs lived in Hiawatha, Kansas where she was an avid award-winning gardener and established the Hiawatha Garden Club. She was an elected officer of her local Knights and Ladies of Honor chapter.

Krebs worked with the local Civic Improvement Club to hold an event for the local children. Called "a special entertainment for the young people to take place of the usual rough pranks and disturbances of injury to property." There was a costume parade with a marching band and a free dance. This event, called the Halloween Frolic, is thought to be the oldest Halloween parade in the United States. Contemporary reports claimed that 1200 people attended the event.

In 1964 on the 50th anniversary of the Halloween Frolic a plaque honoring Krebs was installed by local civic organizations on the Brown County Courthouse near the square where she used to garden. The Comedy Central show Drunk History featured Krebs in their July 24, 2018 episode with Allison Tolman playing the part of Krebs. Krebs died on August 19, 1931. She is buried in Mount Hope Cemetery in Hiawatha, Kansas.
