= Kreps =

Kreps is a surname. Notable people with the surname include:

- David M. Kreps (born 1950), game theorist and economist and professor
- Dean Kreps (born 1961), American football coach and former player
- Gary Kreps, communication scholar
- Juanita M. Kreps (1921–2010), U.S. Secretary of Commerce
- Kamil Kreps (born 1984), Czech professional ice hockey player

== See also ==
- Krebs
