= Stanley LeFevre Krebs =

American psychologist and salesmanship lecturer (1864-1935)

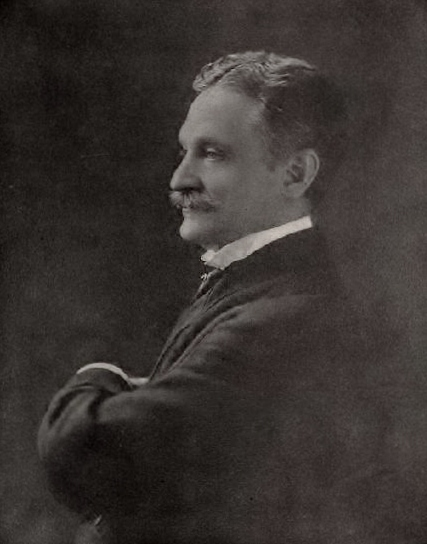
- Born: January 14, 1864; Emmitsburg, Maryland, U.S.
- Died: September 26, 1935 (aged 71); New York City, U.S.
- Occupations: Psychologist, lecturer
- Spouse(s): Anna Frantz Krebs (1867–1954); Marjorie Main (m. 1921)
- Children: 2, including Annabell Krebs Culverwell

Stanley LeFevre Krebs (January 14, 1864 – September 26, 1935) was an American psychologist and salesmanship lecturer.

== Biography ==
In 1889, he received a Doctor of Psychology degree from the Chicago School of Psychology. Krebs was a one time president of the American University of Trade and Applied Commerce of Philadelphia and a pastor in the Reformed Church.

He married the actress Marjorie Main on November 2, 1921. He was the president of the American Institute of Mercantile Art, Philadelphia, where he worked as a salesmanship lecturer.

Throughout his career, he exposed a number of fraudulent mediums. He employed a secret mirror and caught the medium Henry Slade swapping slates and hiding them in the back of his chair. Krebs exposed the Bangs Sisters by using a secret mirror under the table, which caught them tampering with a sealed envelope. During the séance, the sisters would open the envelope and write in it a reply which they would pretend a spirit had written.

He also wrote the book Trick Methods of Eusapia Paladino (1910), which documented the tricks of the medium Eusapia Palladino.

He died from cancer on September 27, 1935, in New York City.

== Publications ==
- The Law of Suggestion (Chicago: Science Press, 1906) reprinted as The Fundamental Principles of Hypnosis (1957)
- A Description of Some Trick Methods Used By Miss Bangs of Chicago (Journal of the Society for Psychical Research, 1901)
- The Frauds of Spiritualism (Suggestion Publishing Company, 1901)
- Trick-Methods of Eusapia Palladino: Major and Minor (Journal of the Society for Psychical Research, 1910)
- Trick Methods of Eusapia Paladino (Philadelphia, 1910)
