= Federico Celestini =

Italian musicologist

Federico Celestini (born 5 December 1964) is an Italian musicologist. Since 2011 he has been professor of musicology at the University of Innsbruck, Austria.

== Life ==
Federico Celestini was born in Rome. He studied violin at the Musikhochschule Giulio Briccialdi in Terni, Italy, and musicology, aesthetics and literature at the Sapienza University of Rome. He received his doctorate in 1998 and the Habilitation in 2004, both in Musicology, at the University of Graz. At the same time, he worked as a member of the Special Research Project "Modern - Vienna and Central Europe around 1900" in the Musicology department at the university until 2005. From 2008 to 2011, Celestini was a lecturer at the Institute of Music Aesthetics at the University of Music and Performing Arts, Graz. Celestini has taught and conducted research as a professor at the Institute of Musicology at the University of Innsbruck since October 2011.

From 2010 to 2012, Celestini ran the project "Scelsi and Austria," with the support of the Austrian Science Fund. Since 2011 he has been editor of the journal Acta Musicologica. He has had fellowships and visiting professorships at the University of Oxford (British Academy, 2002), Riemenschneider Bach Institute (2004), at the Free University of Berlin (Alexander von Humboldt Foundation, 2005-2007), and at the University of Chicago (Mellon Foundation, 2010).

His areas of interest include music of the 18th-21st centuries, approaches to music from cultural studies, music aesthetics, and medieval polyphony.

== Books ==
- "Nietzsches Musikphilosophie. Zur Performativität des Denkens." Wilhelm Fink Verlag, Paderborn 2016, ISBN 3770560574
- Die Unordnung der Dinge. Das musikalisch Groteske in der Wiener Moderne (1885–1914). Stuttgart: Steiner, 2006 (Archiv für Musikwissenschaft 56), ISBN 3-515-08712-5.
- Die frühen Klaviersonaten von Joseph Haydn. Tutzing: Schneider, 2004 (Studien zur Musikwissenschaft 52), ISBN 3-7952-1168-9.
- (with Andreas Dorschel) Arbeit am Kanon. Ästhetische Studien zur Musik von Haydn bis Webern. Vienna, London, and New York: Universal Edition, 2010 (Studien zur Wertungsforschung 51), ISBN 978-3-7024-6967-2.
- (edited with Helga Mitterbauer), Ver-rückte Kulturen. Zur Dynamik kultureller Transfers. Tübingen: Stauffenburg, 2003; second corrected ed. 2011, ISBN 978-3-86057-050-0.
- (edited with Moritz Csáky and Ulrich Tragatschnig), Barock – Ein Ort des Gedächtnisses. Cologne, Weimar and Vienna: Böhlau, 2007, ISBN 978-3-205-77468-6.
- (edited with Gregor Kokorz and Julian Johnson), Musik in der Moderne/Music and Modernism. Cologne, Weimar and Vienna: Böhlau, 2011 (Wiener Veröffentlichungen zur Musikgeschichte, 9), ISBN 3-205-77438-8.
- (edited with Gregor Kokorz), Rudolf Flotzinger: Das sogenannte Organum. Graz: Adeva, 2011, ISBN 978-3-201-01921-7.
