= Columba Krebs =

American painter

- Born: Annabell Krebs; June 13, 1902; Greensburg, Pennsylvania
- Died: April 9, 1998 (aged 95)
- Other names: Anna Belle Culverwell; Anna Belle Columba Krebs
- Education: Hood College, New York School of Fine and Applied Arts
- Spouse: Frank J. Culverwell
- Children: 2
- Parents: Stanley LeFevre Krebs (father); Anna Frantz Krebs (mother)

Annabell Krebs Culverwell (June 13, 1902 – April 9, 1998) was an American painter and author. She took the name Columba Krebs when signing her paintings and writings.

== Biography ==
Annabell Krebs was born on June 13, 1902 in Greensburg, Pennsylvania. Her parents were Anna Frantz (1867–1930) and Stanley LeFevre Krebs (1864–1935). Her father was a one time president of the American University of Trade and Applied Commerce of Philadelphia and a pastor in the Reformed Church. He wrote the book Trick Methods of Eusapia Paladino (1910), exposing the tricks of the medium Eusapia Palladino. His second marriage was to Marjorie Main of Ma and Pa Kettle fame. When about 11 years old, Annabell Krebs lived In Europe for three years. It is claimed that, at age fifteen, she had her first psychic experience; a vision, while living in Wayne, Pennsylvania. After her marriage in 1921, to Frank J. Culverwell, she lived for a time in Singapore, where she began the study of Theosophy, and then in Calcutta and Darjeeling, India. She lived for a time near Joshua Tree National Monument in California. During this time she met and worked with several of America's first UFO contactees. Her work was symbolic in nature. Her occult leanings were often evident in her paintings, for instance depicting the Spirit of St. Louis being guided over the Atlantic by a divine torch, or depictions of psychic phenomenon.

Krebs maintained an address in East Orange, New Jersey, studied at Hood College (1918-1919) and the New York School of Fine and Applied Arts (1920-1921). She exhibited at the Hall of Art in New York in 1932 and 1933; Salons of Art in 1934: Strauss Galleries in New York in 1950. She also exhibited in Bloomfield and Newark, New Jersey. She produced mural panels for Textile H.S., known today as Bayard Rustin Educational Complex, New York. She was a member of the St. Petersburg Arts Club and Newark Arts Club. She held positions as President of Skuddabud Creations from 1936 to 1940 which published a Christian Socialist science fiction book for kids by the same name. She owned Heated Doll Company from 1941 through 1945, and was the owner of Symbolant Company. She later established herself in Prescott, Arizona.

Some of her first drawings were of a political nature to support the Christian Socialist movement in New York City, as was her publication, "The Adventures of Skuddabud" and a cartoon strip by the same name in comic magazines in Brazil and Mexico.

She took the name Columba Krebs when signing her paintings and writings, probably related to the constellation Columba, which is the focal point of several Egyptian pyramids.

She gave presentations on “The Mysteries of Man and the Universe” illustrated with color slides, and "The Mysteries of Human Nature," stressing' phenomena such as mental telepathy and kindred experiences. Krebs even dressed in Oriental costume, to give an illustrated lecture on “Symbolic Art of Life's Marvels.”

She settled in Willow Springs, Missouri. She had two children, James Fleetwood and Frances Belle, with her husband Frank J. Culverwell. She was a member of the Rosicrucian Fellowship, and affiliated with the Faithists.

== Writings ==
Columba Krebs wrote an afterword to the 1970 book The People of the Planet Clarion and worked closely with UFO contactee claimant and author Truman Bethurum with all three of his later books—she noted that Bethurum seemed obsessed by the voluptuous alien Captain Aura Rhanes, and had hired a secretary whom (according to Bethurum) very closely resembled the humanoid Captain Rhanes, leading to Bethurum's wife divorcing him.

Krebs wrote and self-published The Moon is Inhabited in 1961, produced in mimeographed form on a tan paper. The publication had light blue covers with Illustrations of two people on a planet with some form of habitation in what appears to be a crater. There are several types of “flying saucers” and rocket ships in the air. The back cover has a drawing with palm trees and a tube type edifice with a glass dome and a king sitting on a throne inside. Some type of ray has melted a portion of the dome and is either sending down or beaming up humans and animals. There are also illustrations inside the front and back cover. The profits from the sale of this publication were to go to the Cosmic Arts Shrine. The Shrine was built in a pyramid shape with esoteric symbols. She wrote Visiting Spacemen? the same year.
