= Hermano Igo Krebs =

Hermano Igo Krebs is a Brazilian adjunct professor at the University of Maryland School of Medicine and a Fellow of the Institute of Electrical and Electronics Engineers (IEEE).

== Education ==
Krebs obtained his B.Sc. from University of São Paulo in 1980. Seven years later, he got his M.Sc. from the same alma mater and then traveled to Japan to attend its Yokohama National University for two years. He got his Ph.D. from the Massachusetts Institute of Technology in 1997 where he also served as a principal research scientist and lecturer before joining University of Maryland School of Medicine as an adjunct professor.
