= Merkur (magazine) =

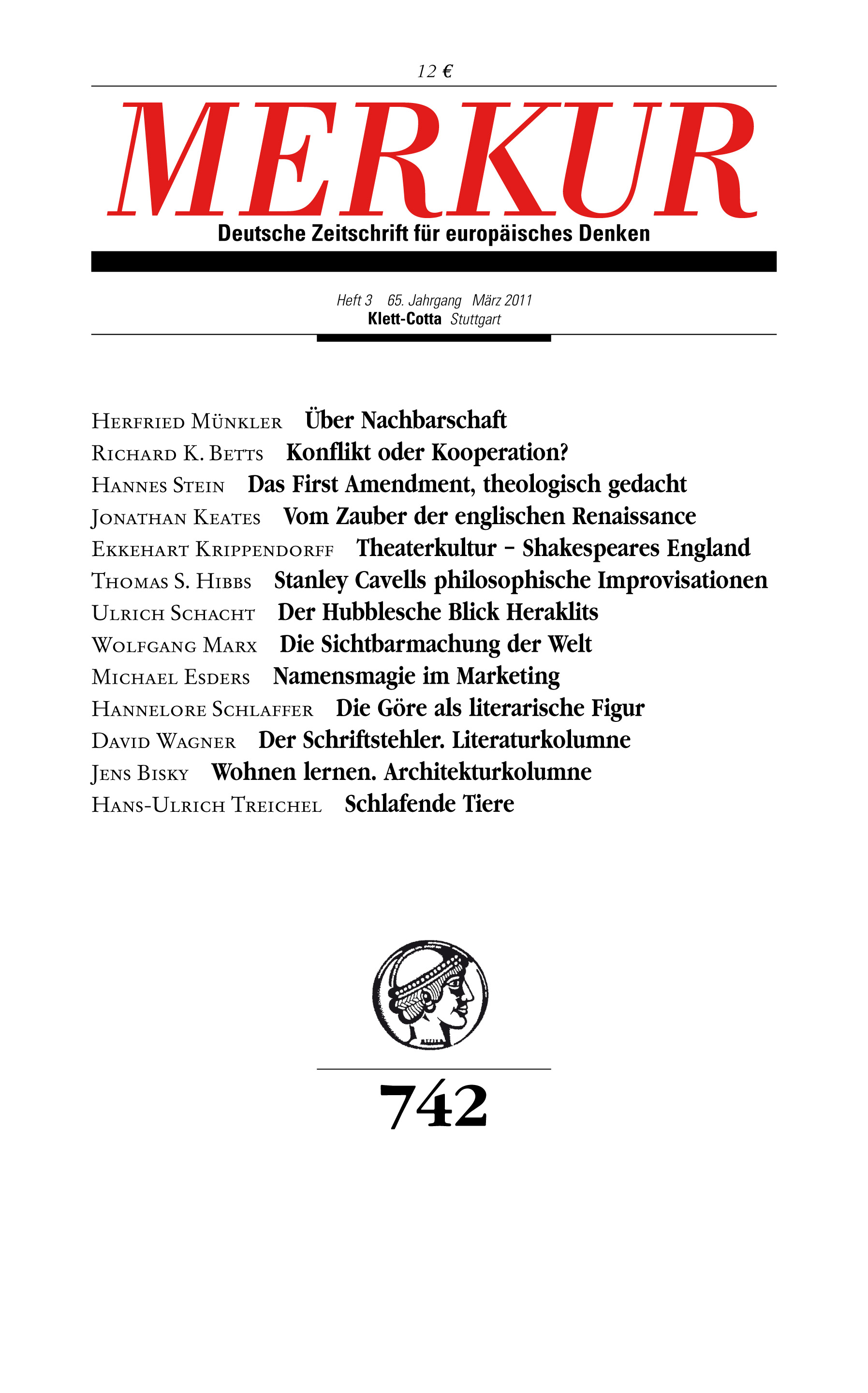
- Frequency: Monthly
- Circulation: 4,800
- Publisher: Klett Cotta
- Founded: 1947; 79 years ago
- Country: Germany
- Based in: Stuttgart
- Language: German
- Website: www.merkur-zeitschrift.de
- ISSN: 0026-0096

Merkur, subtitled Deutsche Zeitschrift für europäisches Denken, is Germany's leading intellectual review, published monthly in Stuttgart by Klett Cotta.

== History and profile ==
Merkur was established in 1947. The magazine was formerly headquartered in Munich.

In the course of its history, many influential scholars and public intellectuals have written for Merkur. Among them were philosophers such as Hannah Arendt, Theodor W. Adorno, Ernst Bloch, Martin Heidegger, Hans-Georg Gadamer, Jürgen Habermas, Axel Honneth, and Carl Schmitt or sociologists such as Arnold Gehlen, Niklas Luhmann, Hans Joas, and Dirk Baecker, but also writers such as Ingeborg Bachmann, Ilse Aichinger, Alfred Andersch, Hans Magnus Enzensberger, and Kathrin Röggla. Merkur has been able to gather voices from both the left and the right, which is unusual in the divisive German intellectual landscape.

Merkur sold approximately 4,800 copies in July 2011. In January 2016, the 800th issue was published.

== See also ==
- List of magazines in Germany
