= Krebs House =

Krebs House may refer to:

- De La Pointe-Krebs House, Pascagoula, Mississippi, also known as Old Spanish Fort, a Mississippi Landmark
- Knights of Columbus Hall (Pascagoula, Mississippi), also known as Krebs House, a Mississippi Landmark
- Agnes V. Krebs House, Pascagoula, Mississippi, NRHP-listed in Jackson County, Mississippi
- James Krebs House, Pascagoula, Mississippi, NRHP-listed in Jackson County, Mississippi
