= Angelika Krebs =

German philosopher (born 1961)

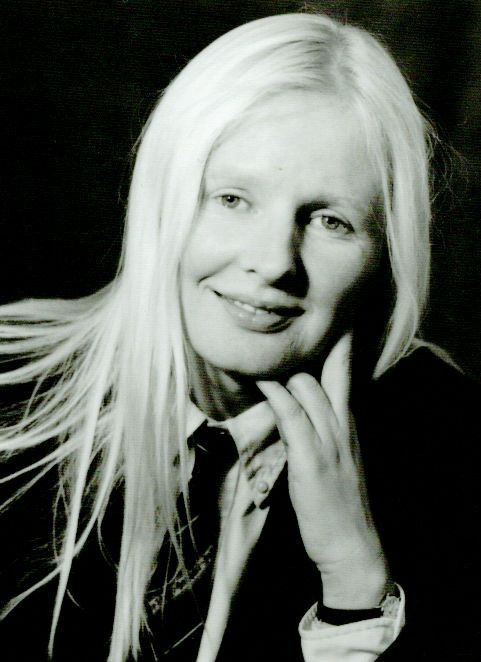
Angelika Krebs

Angelika Krebs (born August 12, 1961, in Mannheim) is a German philosopher.

== Education and career ==
Angelika Krebs studied philosophy, German literature and musicology in Freiburg, Oxford, Konstanz and Berkeley. She did her PhD with Friedrich Kambartel, Bernard Williams and Jürgen Habermas in Frankfurt in 1993. Her dissertation thesis on environmental ethics won the Wolfgang Stegmüller award of the German Society for Analytical Philosophy. From 1993 to 2001 she was an assistant professor in Frankfurt, writing her habilitation thesis on work, justice and love. In 2001, she was appointed to the chair for practical philosophy at the University of Basel. She was Rockefeller visiting fellow at the Center for Human Values in Princeton and Rachel Carson fellow at LMU in Munich. She served as a member of the advisory board of both the German and the Swiss Society for Philosophy. Since 2013 she has been a fellow of the European Academy of Sciences and Arts. In 2013 she co-founded the European Society for the Philosophical Study of Emotions together with Aaron Ben-Ze'ev (Haifa) and Anthony Hatzimoysis (Athens).

== Work ==
Her main research areas are environmental ethics, political philosophy, theories of emotion and aesthetics. In environmental ethics, she argues for the intrinsic value of beautiful nature and of nature as "Heimat" [home]. In political philosophy, she propagates a humanistic alternative to standard egalitarian approaches to justice and shows why family work should be fully recognized as economic work. In emotion theory she develops a dialogical model of romantic love following Martin Buber and Max Scheler. In 2017 she edited together with Aaron Ben-Ze'ev from the University of Haifa a four-volume collection on the philosophy of the emotions. Her most recent work is in aesthetics and explores why the beauty of landscape matters.

== Selected bibliography ==
- (Ed.) Naturethik. Frankfurt: Suhrkamp 1997
- Ethics of Nature. A Map. With a Preface by Bernard Williams. Berlin: de Gruyter 1999
- (Ed.) Gleichheit oder Gerechtigkeit. Frankfurt: Suhrkamp 2000
- Arbeit und Liebe. Frankfurt: Suhrkamp 2002
- Zwischen Ich und Du. Frankfurt: Suhrkamp 2015
- (Ed.) Philosophy of Emotion (together with A. Ben-Ze’ev). Four Volumes: The Nature of Emotions, II. Emotions and the Good Life, III. Morality, Aesthetics, and the Emotions, IV. Specific Emotions. London: Routledge 2017
- (Ed.) The Meaning of Moods (together with A. Ben-Ze’ev). Guest-publication of an issue of the journal Philosophia. Berlin: Springer 2017
- Das Weltbild der Igel. Naturethik einmal anders (together with Stephanie Schuster, Alexander Fischer und Jan Müller). Basel: Schwabe, 2021.
