= Elias Carl Strokirk =

Swedish ironmaster (1814–1887)

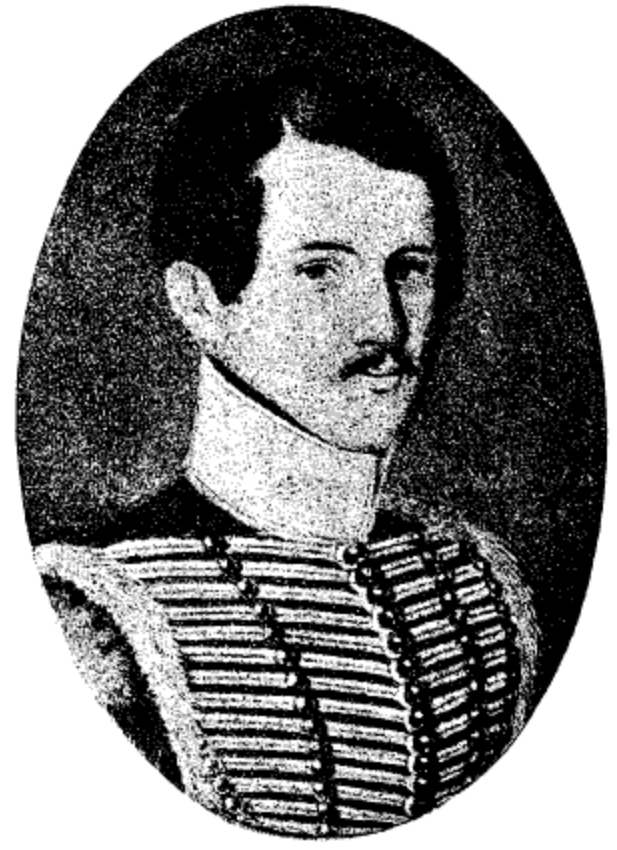
- Elias Carl Strokirk
- Born: Elias Carl Strokirk; 15 September 1814; Ölsboda (present-day Degerfors Municipality), Sweden
- Died: 13 June 1887 (aged 72); Degernäs Manor, Sweden–Norway
- Occupation: Ironmaster
- Spouse: Ulrica Hammarhjelm (m. 1844)
- Children: 13
- Father: Jeppe Strokirk
- Relatives: Strokirk family

Elias Carl Strokirk (15 September 1814 – 13 June 1887) was a Swedish ironmaster and cavalry master.

== Life and work ==
Elias Carl Strokirk was born on September 15, 1814, at Ölsboda, and member of the Strokirk family. His parents were Jeppe and Hedvig Magdalena Strokirk (née Broms).

In 1841, Strokirk acquired the Ölsboda Works and the Öfre Degernäs Works. In addition, Strokrik served as director of Christinehamns Enskilda Bank. Strokirk was appointed knight of the Order of the Sword.

In 1844, Elias Carl Strokirk married Ulrika Charlotta Emerentia Hammarhjelm.
