= Camitz family =

Swedish family

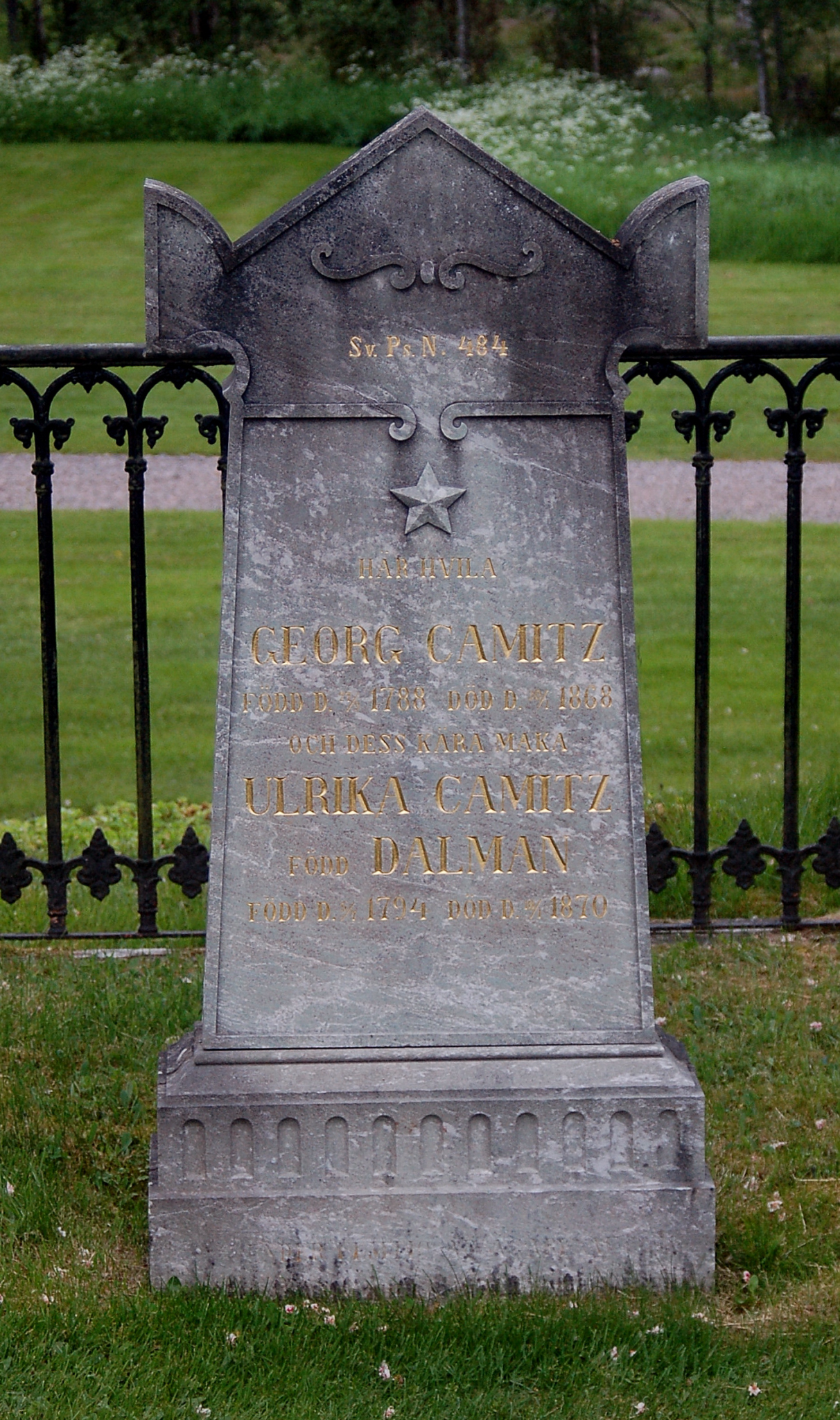
Gravestone of 2 members of the family

The Camitz family is a Swedish family, founded as an Austrian Silesian noble family, important to the industrial history of the broader Karlskoga–Degerfors-area. Where they managed ironworks.

== History ==
A member of the Camitz family, ironmaster Georg Camitz, established the Degerfors Works in the 17th century, and managed both the Bofors and the Björkborn Works. In addition, he served as the mayor of Kristinehamn. Other members include Johan Camitz the Younger, who in the 18th century served as the first ironmaster to the Degernäs Works.

Connected families include the Strokirk family whose members married into the Camitz family. They operated the works for 200 years, establishing themselves as an industrial dynasty that held great significance in the history of Degerfors.

== See also ==
- Johan Camitz
- Ulf Camitz
