= Kloka Anna =

Swedish cunning woman and medium

- Born: Anna Johansdotter; 15 July 1797; Sweden
- Died: 1860 (aged 62–63); Sweden
- Other names: Anna Jonsdotter
- Occupations: Cunning woman, folk healer, medium
- Known for: Folk medicine, spiritual practices, Swedish folklore

Anna Johansdotter or Anna Jonsdotter (15 July 1797 – 1860), was a Swedish cunning woman and medium. She has been the subject of much legends and myths. She is known and referred to by her nickname Kloka Anna ("Wise Anna").

== Biography ==
Anna was born in a poor family in Liatorp in Småland. She worked as a farmhand until 1822, when she started to support herself as a cunning woman. She lived in Göteryd in 1822-184s and after that in Pjätteryd, where she became famous. According to legend, she acquired her wisdom after having eaten some Vaccinium vitis-idaea which had been touched by a white snake, who had passed her path one day in the woods when she was a child.

Anna was considered to be a clairvoyant and to have the ability to heal the sick, and she received clients nationwide who consulted her in both these capacities. Anna adjusted her fee according to what the clients could afford to pay, which meant that she occasionally gave free help. She is described as a stout matron with dark piercing eyes and a dark forceful voice, and she was also known for her many black cats. In her capacity as a natural healer, she used herbal medicine: her daughter Kristina participated as her assistant in this field.

As a Clairvoyant, she was often consulted for her ability to localise stolen property. She had a good reputation for succeeding with her tasks and was popular.

Anna was reputed to be a white witch who could master sorcery, and she was known to threaten men, who had impregnated women and then abandoned them with sorcery unless they took responsibility. In 1847, Anna was convicted to fines or seven days for superstition after having taught the maid Johanna Jonsdotter to put a spell on her fiancé Johannes Jonsson. As was often the case in court cases against cunning folk, the conviction worked as advertise and gave her more assignments.

Anna had eleven children in her first marriage and one in her second, of which two survived to adulthood. She had her godson Karl Hart as well as her maid Ingrid Johansson, called Lill-ingerten, to succeed her.

The myths surrounding Kloka Anna is kept at Folklivsarkivet.

== See also ==
- Karin Olofsdotter
- Anna Johansdotter Norbäck
