= Strokirk family =

Swedish noble family

Strokirk Strokirch, von Strokirch, Strokerken
- Swedish and Baltic noble family
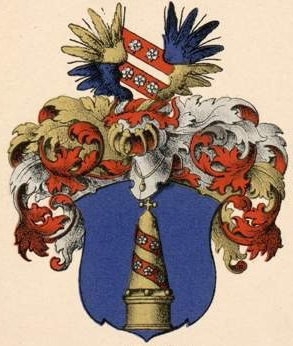
- Country: Sweden
- Founded: 1684; 1686; 1691
- Estates: Aumeisteri Manor; Degernäs Manor; Ölsboda Manor

The Strokirk family, also known as von Strokirch, is a Baltic German and Swedish noble family of German origin. Different branches of the family were elevated to noble rank in the Kingdom of Sweden and Livonian Knighthood.

== Overview ==
In 1620, Evert Strokirch moved from Lübeck in Germany to Filipstad, Sweden. The family acquired both manors and estates in Sweden and Livonia (present-day Latvia and Estonia).

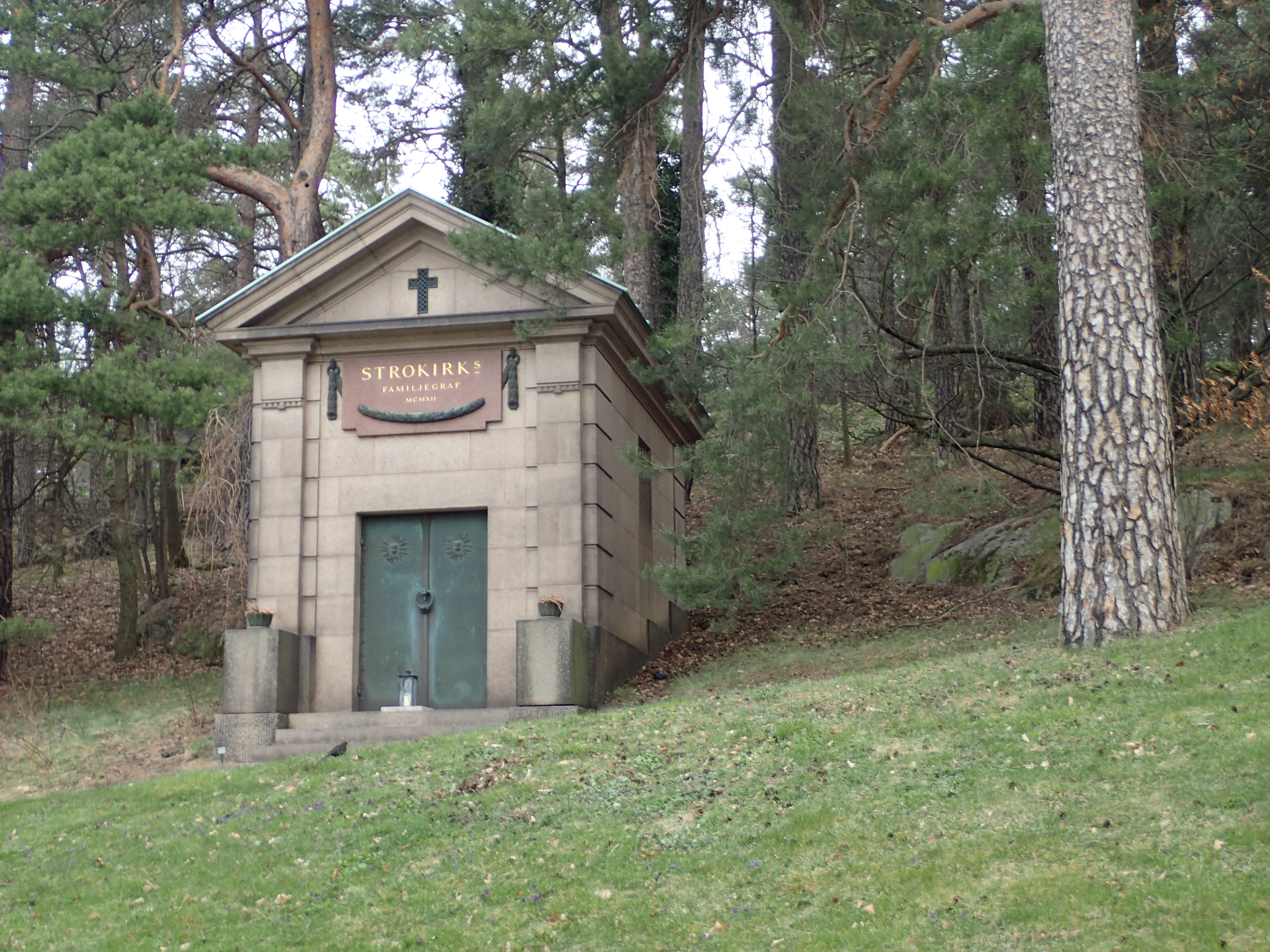
The Strokirk family burial vault at Norra begravningsplatsen

Members of the Strokirk family were in the 18th century living in the broader Karlskoga–Degerfors-area, where they managed ironworks, in the present-day corresponding municipalities of Degerfors and Karlskoga. Including the properties of the Lidetorp and Ölsboda Works.

== Notable members ==
- Einar von Strokirch
- Elias Strokirk
- Elias Carl Strokirk
- Jeppe Strokirk

== See also ==
- List of Swedish noble families
