= Passion Play of Stora Bjurum =

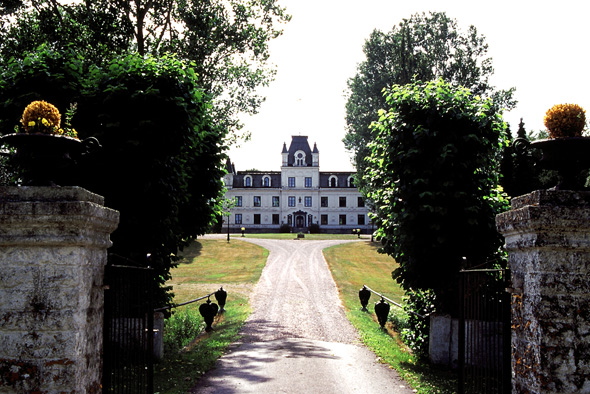
Stora Bjurum

The Passionsspelen på Stora Bjurum (the Passion Play at Stora Bjurum) was performed in Sweden in 1738–1741, when the manor Bjurum in Västergötland became the center of a religious dissident sect. The dissident group was given the support of the owner of the manor, Countess Eva Margareta Stenbock. The movement excluded itself from the church and practised a form of socialism. In 1738, the sect was subjected to an investigation on behalf of the church, and the name of the incident refers to a passion play in which a female preacher, Dordi Olofsdotter, undertook the role of Christ. The movement was suppressed after Stenbock subjected to reuniting with the church in 1741.

== Movement ==
The origin of the incident at Stora Bjurum was a movement founded in Vänersborg by a priest by the name of Lenberg some years before. The movement disliked the church and focused on a personal, internal religious service and interpretation of the Bible. This teleology reached the parish of Bjurum with two female preachers from Främmestad: Kerstin Andersdotter and Dordi Olofsdotter. Stora Bjurum was at the time owned by Major Count Erik Fredrik Stenbock (1686–1739), though the actual manager of the estate was his spouse, Eva Margareta Clerck (d. 1743). Clerck became a follower of the movement, and gave its congregation refuge at the estate, which made Stora Bjurum the center of the cult. Among the members of the movement who came to Bjurum because of this were the dissident priests Nils Nabbelius and Sven Hulthén, the last of whom also opened a school there. Clerck also encouraged the population in the surrounding countryside to join the movement with all sorts of privileges.

== Investigation ==
These activities were in fact illegal according to the then-existing law, the Conventicle Act, which banned private sermons. On 28 February 1738, Stora Bjurum was investigated by the authorities and a delegation from the consistory led by the vicar Sven Holmvall, who filed a report to the authorities.

According to the report, the members of the congregation lived in Stora Bjurum manor house. Many of them were reportedly sick and bedridden upon his arrival, but while he was there, the sick were miraculously cured by the dissident vicar Nabbelius. Some of the sick reacted with convulsions, religious ecstasy and condemnations of the clergy. It was pointed out that siblings of the opposite gender shared beds, and implied that the members of the congratulation participated in extramarital sex. Some of the members had vandalized the local church in Mårby, and one of them, Alita Sundberg, a female relative and lady's companion of the countess, had performed a sexual act by the church altar. Holmvall also witnessed a Passion Play, where a woman, the female preacher Dordi Olofsdotter, acted in the part of Jesus Christ.

== The plays' end ==
By the report, Stora Bjurum was classified as a place of dissident activity against the church. Countess Stenbock, Eva Margareta Clerck, was scandalized and banned from church. Upon the death of her spouse in 1739, she had him buried in Skara cathedral outside of the ceremonies of the church. The authorities finally acted, however. The leading members of the movement, among them the preachers Andersdotter and Olofsdotter, and the dissident priest Nabbelius, were exiled from the parish – Nabbelius evidently married Andersdotter. By Christmas 1740, most of the members had returned to the church: on 22 September, Eva Margareta Clerck herself also declared before the authorities that she herself was reunited with the church. In reality, however, she had been converted to the Moravian Church by one of its main missionaries in Sweden, Elias Östergren. She benefited the Moravian movement in Sweden until her death, and is regarded as one of three most notable converts who contributed to the rapid spread of the Moravian Church in Sweden in the mid 18th-century.

== See also ==
- Karin Olofsdotter
- Gråkoltarna
