= Grey Robes =

Swedish radical pietist sect

Gråkoltarna (approximately "Greyfrocks", "The Grey Shirts" or "Grey Robes") was a religious mystic-apocalyptic sect within Radical Pietism, active in Stockholm in Sweden in the 1730s.

== Origin ==
The sect was formed in the residence of Anna Maria van den Aveelen in Södermalm in Stockholm. She was the widow of the artist Johannes van den Aveelen from the Netherlands. She gathered women to meetings of prayer and Bible studies. The Bible meetings became popular, and attracted more and more people, among them the radical pietist Sven Rosén, who turned the Bible study group into a sect.

The congregation of the Gråkoltarna consisted of both sexes; however, females had a dominating and leading place. Among the members were members of the noble families Grundelstierna and von Strokirch, as well as the Bryntzenius family and female domestics and wives of soldiers.

== Ideology ==
Gråkoltarna believed in the interpretations of dreams and visions, and their message was that the apocalypse was approaching. Because of this, it was essential to prepare oneself for eternity and make amends for one's sins. The members therefore renounced their possessions and practiced a policy of collective ownership of property. They also renounced work, and everything which could distract them from a spiritual life and what they felt that they had been ordered to do by divinity. Many also chose to live in celibacy. They regarded luxury consumption and wealth, growing in Stockholm because of the flourishing merchant business in Sweden during the Age of Liberty, as sinful.

The sect also attracted positive attention and followers outside of Stockholm.

== Activity ==
The sect started to attract attention from the Stockholm authorities in 1731. Many members by that time started to practice charitable work among the poor as a way of their spiritual life. As they had renounced all worldly possessions, they also adopted the most simple dress possible, and were therefore referred to as Gråkoltarna, 'the Grey Shirts'. Many of them had adopted this dress after having sold their old clothes and handing out the money among the poor.

== Persecution ==
The sect violated the law of the Conventicle Act, which banned all religious gatherings outside of the state church in order to protect the power of the church. In July 1731, the sect was reported to the authorities by the vicar of the Maria congregation in Stockholm. At the following arrest, nine women and a man by the name Lexelius were arrested: the rest had fled to avoid arrest.

Anna Maria van den Aveelen denied having participated in a sect and claimed that the gatherings had been common prayer gatherings by the people and guests of her household, and was left with a fine and lectures on how to avoid breaking the laws of the church, as were Lexelius and his wife.

The leading members of the cult were however imprisoned. Among them were Anna Gustafsdotter, Maria Eriksdotter and Elisabet Forsman, who were all placed in Långholmens spinnhus, Stockholm. Anna Gustafsdotter stated that she would never worship the clergy nor submit to anyone except God. They were all imprisoned and sentenced to receive religious instruction. Swedish historian Bengt Sundkler described them as "an apocalyptic-kiliastic pietist movement, the so-called Gråkoltarna [Greyfrocks] in Stockholm of the 1730s" who were "impoverished, destitute Swedes appearing in penitential grey coats".

In prison, the women refused to work, attend religious services, convert back to the church or eat. They caused great concern with their statement that God had not given them permission to work. They were imprisoned in cells deprived of light and heating. One of the "Sisters", Klara Tomasdotter, died during their captivity. Maria Eriksdotter was released in 1736, after having become pregnant with a member of the sect and allowed to marry him, and Forsman returned to her own spouse after this. In 1738, Anna Gustafsdotter, a leading member of the sect, became the last to submit to the church, and was thereby freed.

== See also ==
- Karin Olofsdotter
- Passionsspelen på Stora Bjurum
