= Norbäck =

Norbäck is a Swedish surname. Notable people with the surname include:

- Anna Johansdotter Norbäck (1804–1879), Swedish religious leader
- Jan Norbäck (born 1956), Swedish tennis player
