= Svartå =

- Urban settlement
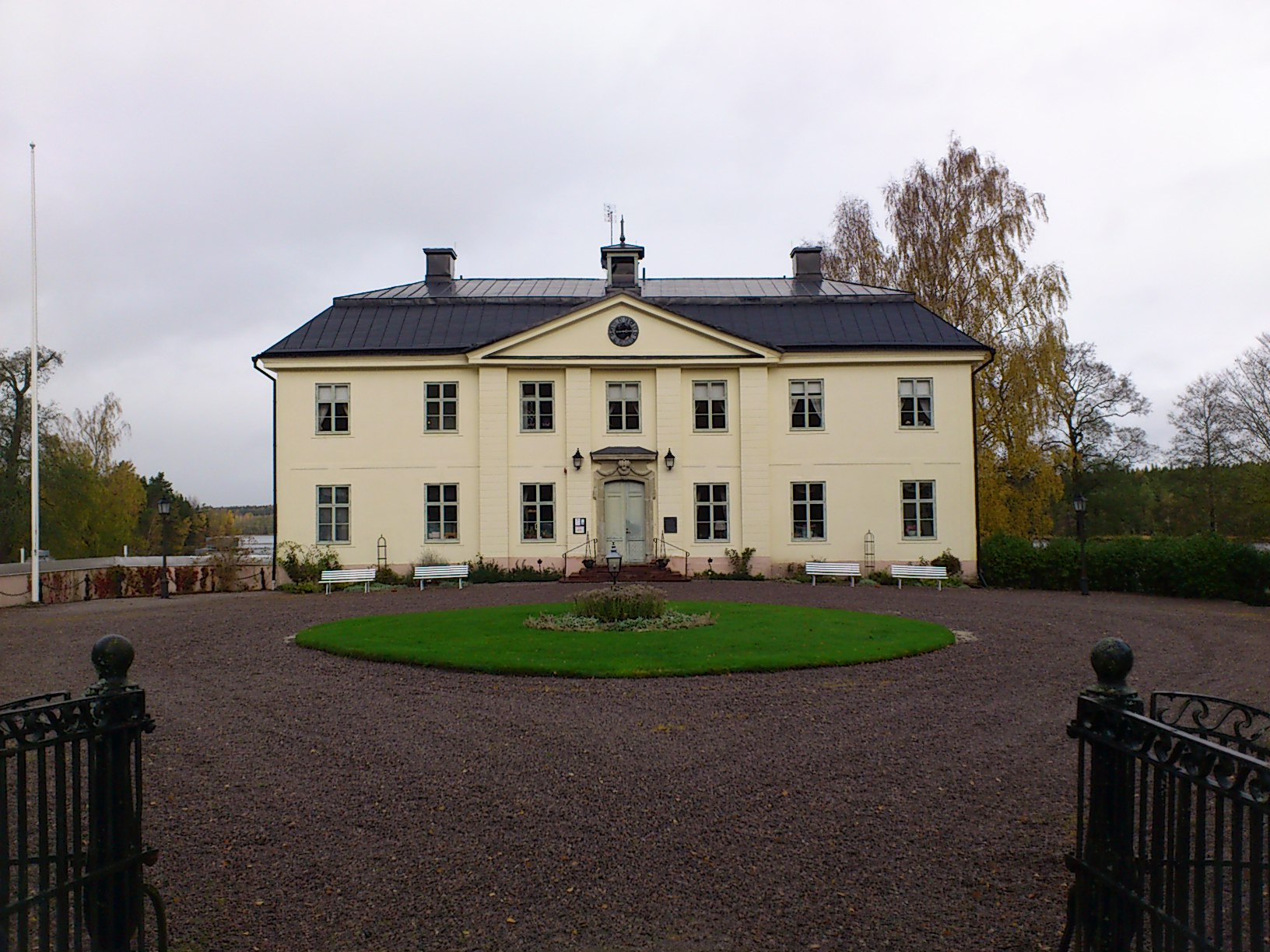
- Svartå Manor

- Location within Örebro Location within Sweden
- Coordinates: 59°07′30″N 14°31′00″E
- Country: Sweden
- Province: Närke
- County: Örebro County
- Municipality: Degerfors Municipality

Area
  - Total: 1.10 km^{2} (0.42 sq mi)

Population (31 December 2010)
  - Total: 495
  - Density: 451/km^{2} (1,170/sq mi)
- Time zone: UTC+1 (CET)
  - Summer (DST): UTC+2 (CEST)

Svartå is a locality situated in Degerfors Municipality, Örebro County, Sweden with 495 inhabitants in 2010.
