= Hallaryd =

Locality in Älmhult Municipality, Sweden

Coordinates: 56.4850°N 13.8850°E

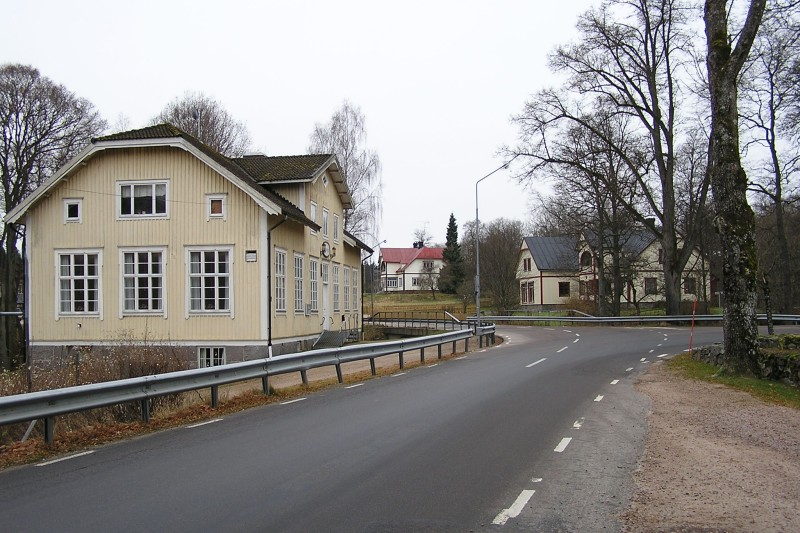
Hallaryd2007

Hallaryd is a locality situated in Älmhult Municipality, Kronoberg County, Sweden.
