= Svartå Manor =

Coordinates: 59°06′45″N 14°32′37″E

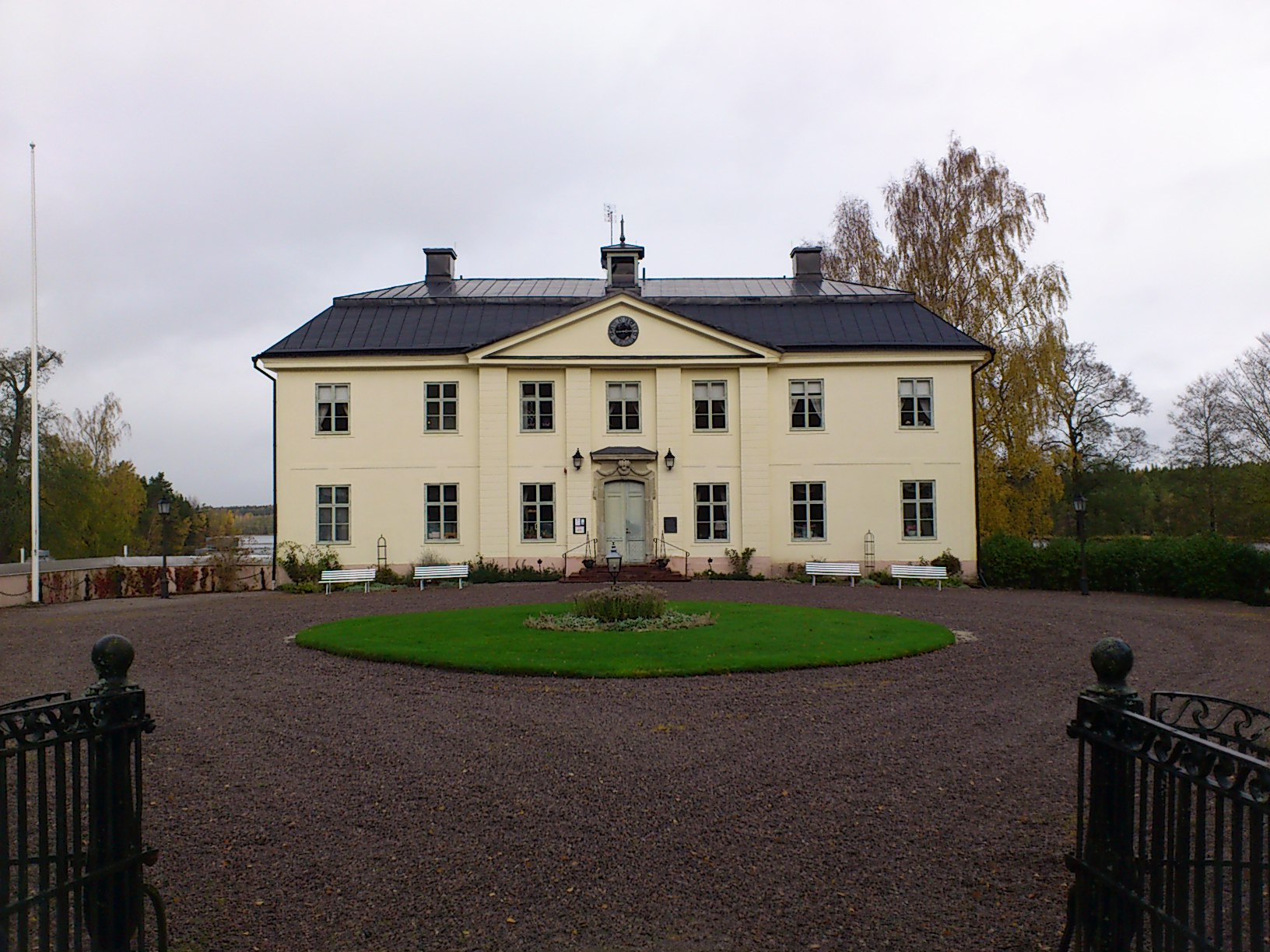
- Svartå Manor in 2011

General information
- Type: Manor house
- Location: Svartå, Sweden

Website
- Link

Svartå Manor (Swedish: Svartå herrgård) is a manor house located at the southernmost tip of lake Lill-Björken in Degerfors Municipality, Örebro County. The current standing manor was built in 1782, during the Gustavian era, and consists of three buildings and a manor park.

The manor was built during the residency of Carl Falker, hofmarschall to the Swedish Royal Court.

The manor is noted for its neoclassical architecture, including decorative stucco ceilings and original tiled stoves preserved from the late 18th century. The surrounding park was designed in the English landscape style, featuring winding paths, an ornamental pond, and an oak-lined avenue leading up to the main building.

The estate has historically been associated with ironworks in the surrounding region, and several of the outbuildings once served as housing for blacksmiths and other workers. In the latter part of the 20th century the manor was occasionally used for cultural events such as author readings, chamber music concerts, and seasonal markets.

In 2021, the manor house was acquired by two Swedish writers, Christina and Thomas Erikson.

== See also ==
- List of castles and palaces in Sweden
  - Degernäs Manor
  - Ölsboda Manor
