= Thomas Erikson =

Swedish author (born 1965)

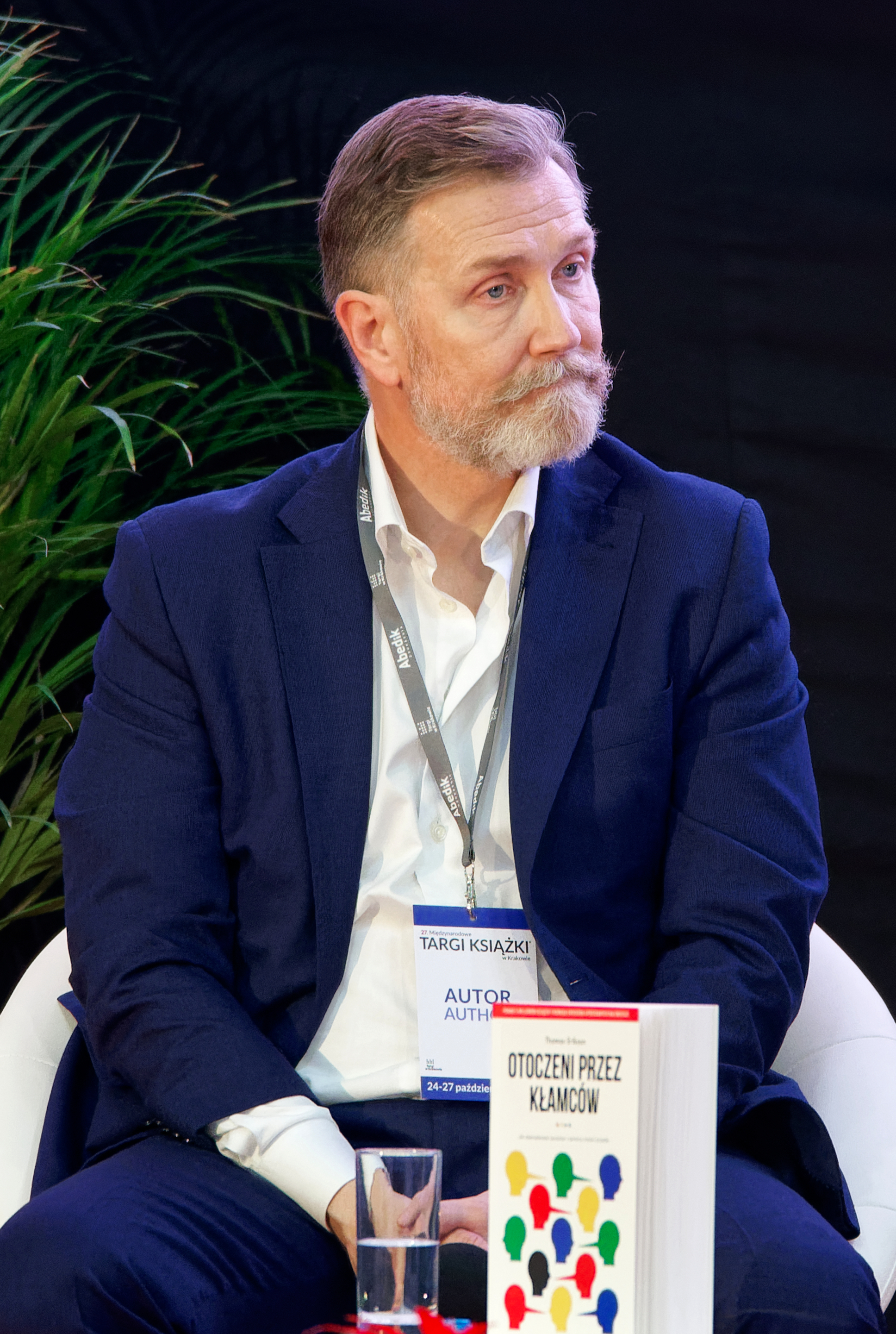
- Erikson at the International Book Fair in Kraków 2024
- Born: Thomas Lennart Joakim Erikson; 19 September 1965 (age 60); Örnsköldsvik, Sweden
- Occupation: Writer
- Spouse: Christina Erikson
- Children: 2
- Writing career
- Genres: Self help; popular psychology
- Website: surroundedbyidiots.com

Thomas Lennart Joakim Erikson (born 19 September 1965) is a Swedish author. He is known for his self-help book series Surrounded By, more specifically his book, Surrounded by Idiots, in which he categorizes the personalities of people in colors based on the pseudoscientific DISC assessment.

== Early life ==
Thomas Lennart Joakim Erikson was born on 19 September 1965 in Örnsköldsvik, Västernorrland County, Sweden.

== Surrounded By Book Series ==
Erikson used the DISC assessment to write his Surrounded By book series. This series includes books such as Surrounded by Idiots (2014), Surrounded by Bad Bosses and Lazy Employees (2021), and Surrounded by Liars (2024).

As of 2019, Surrounded by Idiots has sold 1.5 million copies worldwide, with roughly 750,000 of those sales coming from Sweden alone.

Title	Year	Notes & Ref.
Surrounded by Idiots	2014	Uses the DISC method to categorize personality traits
Surrounded by Psychopaths	2020	Focuses on manipulation tactics & detecting social predators
Surrounded by Bad Bosses and Lazy Employees	2021	DISC based advice focusing on workplace leadership
Surrounded by Setbacks	2021	Focuses on overcoming personal adversity
Surrounded by Narcissists	2022	Has themes of emotion manipulation
Surrounded by Energy Vampires	2023	The title refers people who emotionally drained others
Surrounded by Liars	2024	Has been compared to "astrology for professionals"

=== Reception and criticism ===
The book, Surrounded by Idiots, has become a global bestseller, being translated into over 40 languages. It has been praised for its accessibility and broad appeal, though there has also been criticism from skeptical organizations due to Erikson's use of the unscientific DISC assessment. In 2018, the Swedish organization, Vetenskap och Folkbildning – the Swedish Skeptics Association (Vof), named Erikson "Fraudster of the Year" after basing his book, Surrounded by Idiots, on the DISC assessment which was characterized as pseudoscientific. In 2024, it was also reiterated that he lacks background and formal education in behavior studies.

== Other writings ==
Erikson's debut work was the 2011 crime fiction novel, Bländverk. He also co-authored the Rita Benson book series with his wife, Christina Erikson. The series's first book, Av jord är du kommen, was published in 2015, and its second novel, Dödgrävarens dotter, was published in 2017.

== Personal life ==
Erikson is married to novelist Christina Erikson, with whom he has two children. In 2021, he and his wife purchased Svartå Manor.
