= Jeppe Strokirk =

Swedish ironmaster (1789–1856)

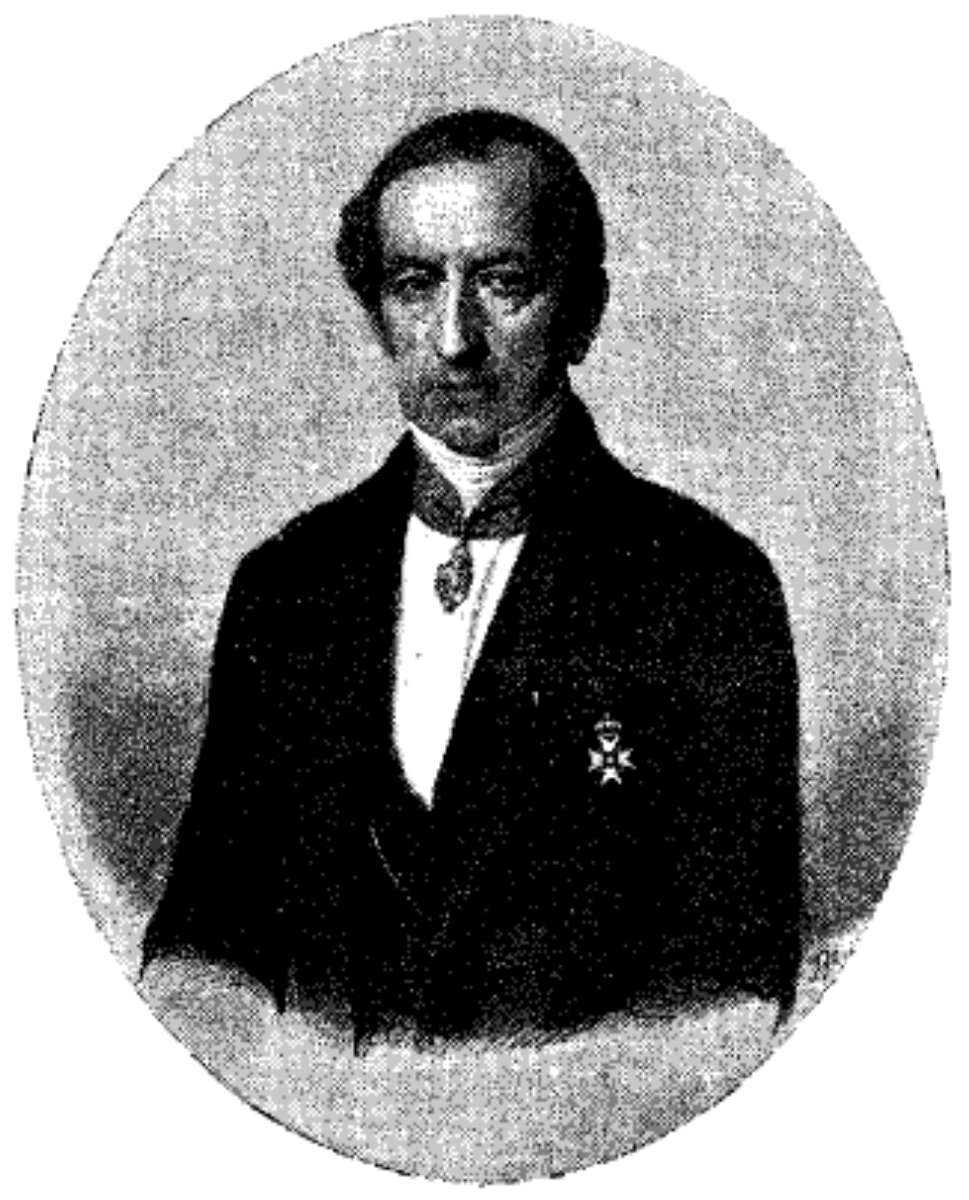
- Jeppe Strokirk
- Born: Jeppe Strokirk; 16 June 1789; Ölsboda (present-day Degerfors Municipality), Sweden
- Died: 16 February 1856 (aged 66); Ölsboda Manor, Sweden–Norway
- Occupation: Ironmaster
- Spouse: Hedvig Magdalena Broms (m. 1812)
- Children: 8, including Elias
- Father: Elias Strokirk

Jeppe Strokirk (16 June 1789 – 16 February 1856) was a Swedish ironmaster.

== Life and work ==
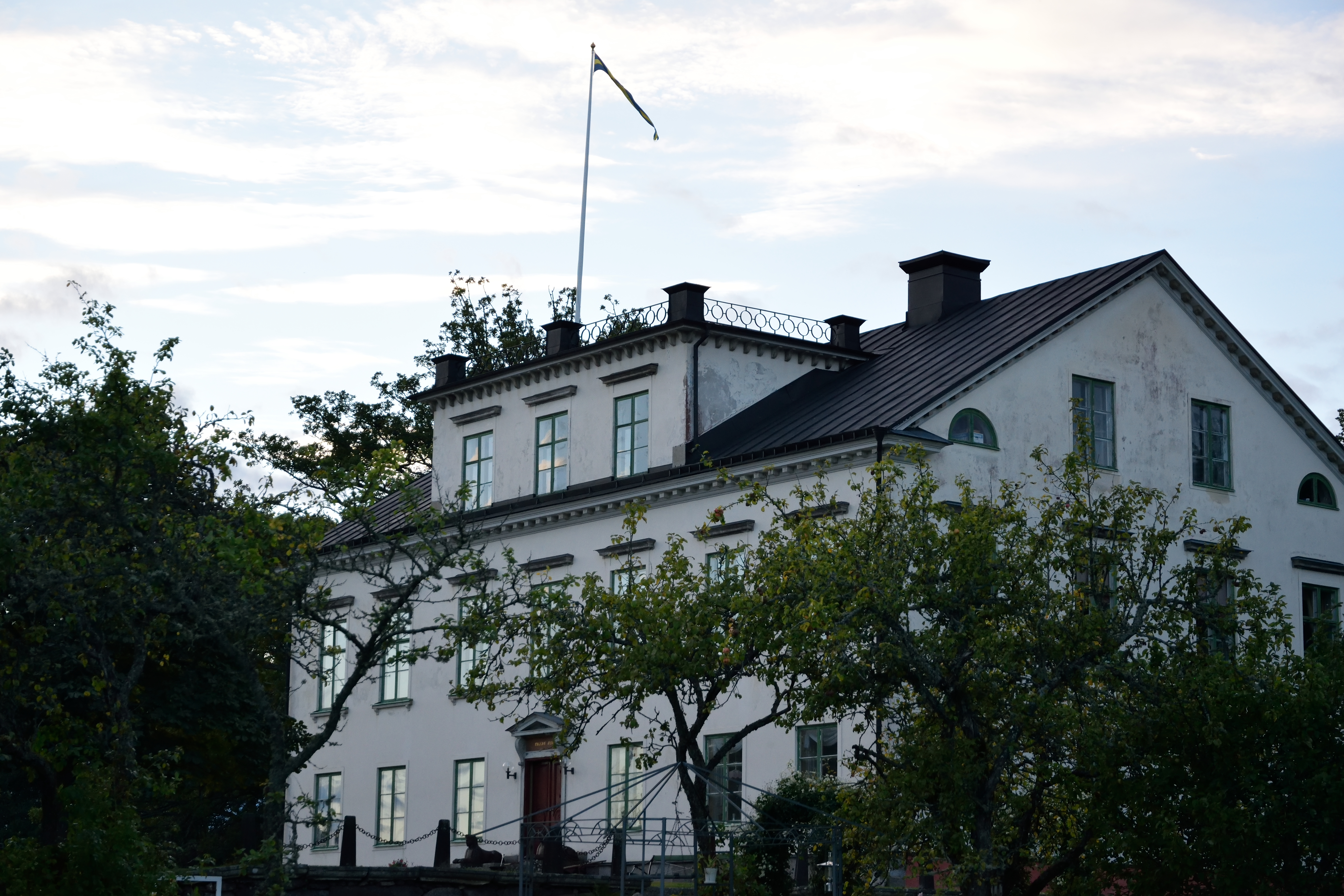
Ölsboda Manor

Jeppe Strokirk was born in Ölsboda on June 16, 1789. His parents were Elias and Anna Christina Strokirk (née Camitz).

Strokirk inherited the Ölsboda Works. In 1828, he erected the Ölsboda Manor, currently the only listed building in Degerfors Municipality.

In 1812, Elias Strokirk married Hedvig Magdalena Broms.
