= Ölsboda Manor =

Listed historical structure in Ölsboda, Sweden

Coordinates: 59°10′51″N 14°28′32″E

- Ölsboda herrgård
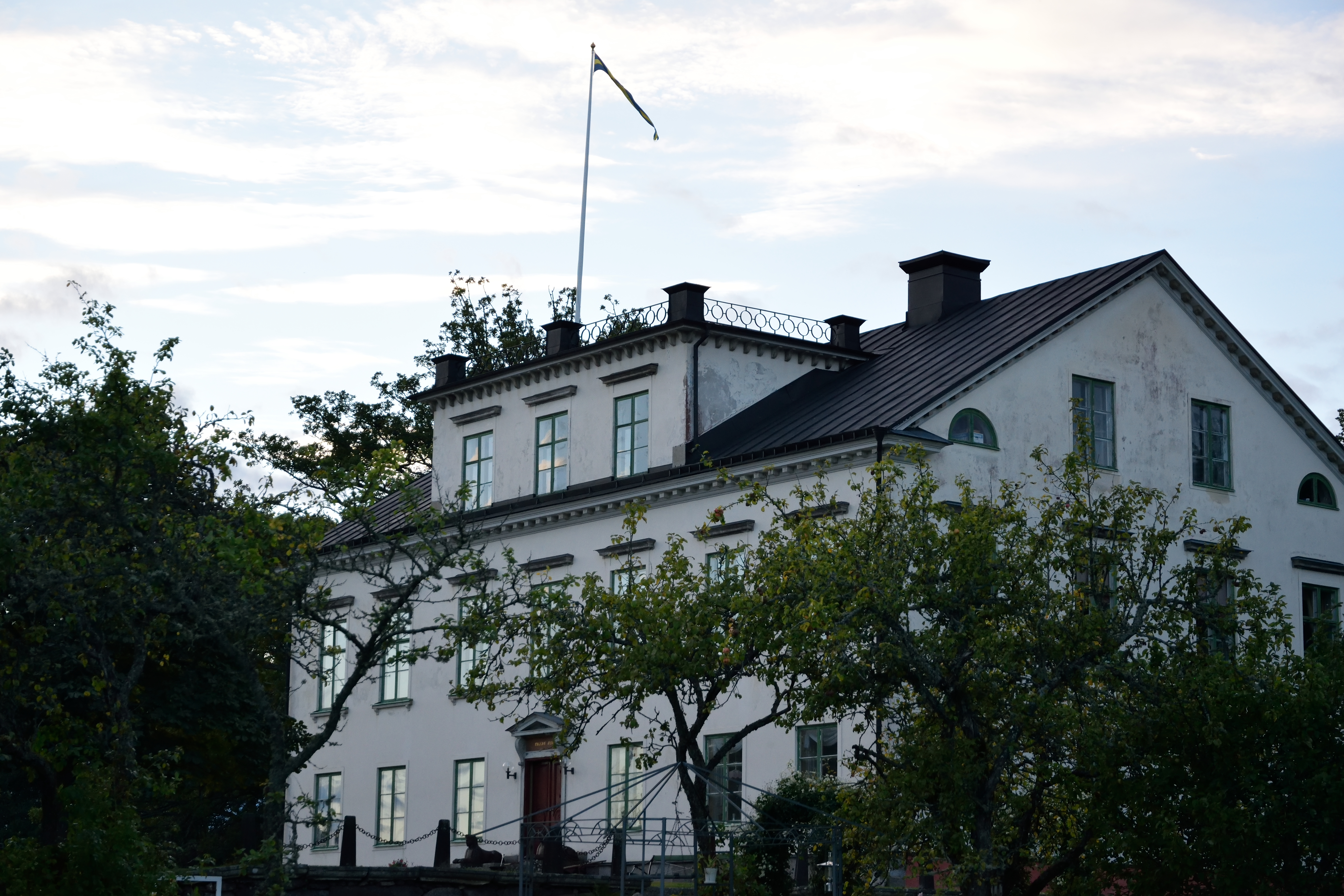
- Interactive map of the Ölsboda Manor area

General information
- Location: Ölsboda, Degerfors Municipality, Sweden
- Completed: 1828

Design and construction
- Architect: Fredrik Blom
- Designations

Listed Building
- Designated: 2002
- Reference no.: 21400000698062

Ölsboda Manor (Swedish: Ölsboda herrgård, Swedish pronunciation: [ˈø̂lsˌbuːda ˈhɛ̌rːɡoːɖ]) is a manor house and former noble residence located south of Ölsboda, Örebro County, Sweden. It is the only listed building in Degerfors Municipality.

Ölsboda Manor is near Lake Ölen, southeast of Degerfors. It is bounded notionally by Kilsbergen to the east.

== History ==
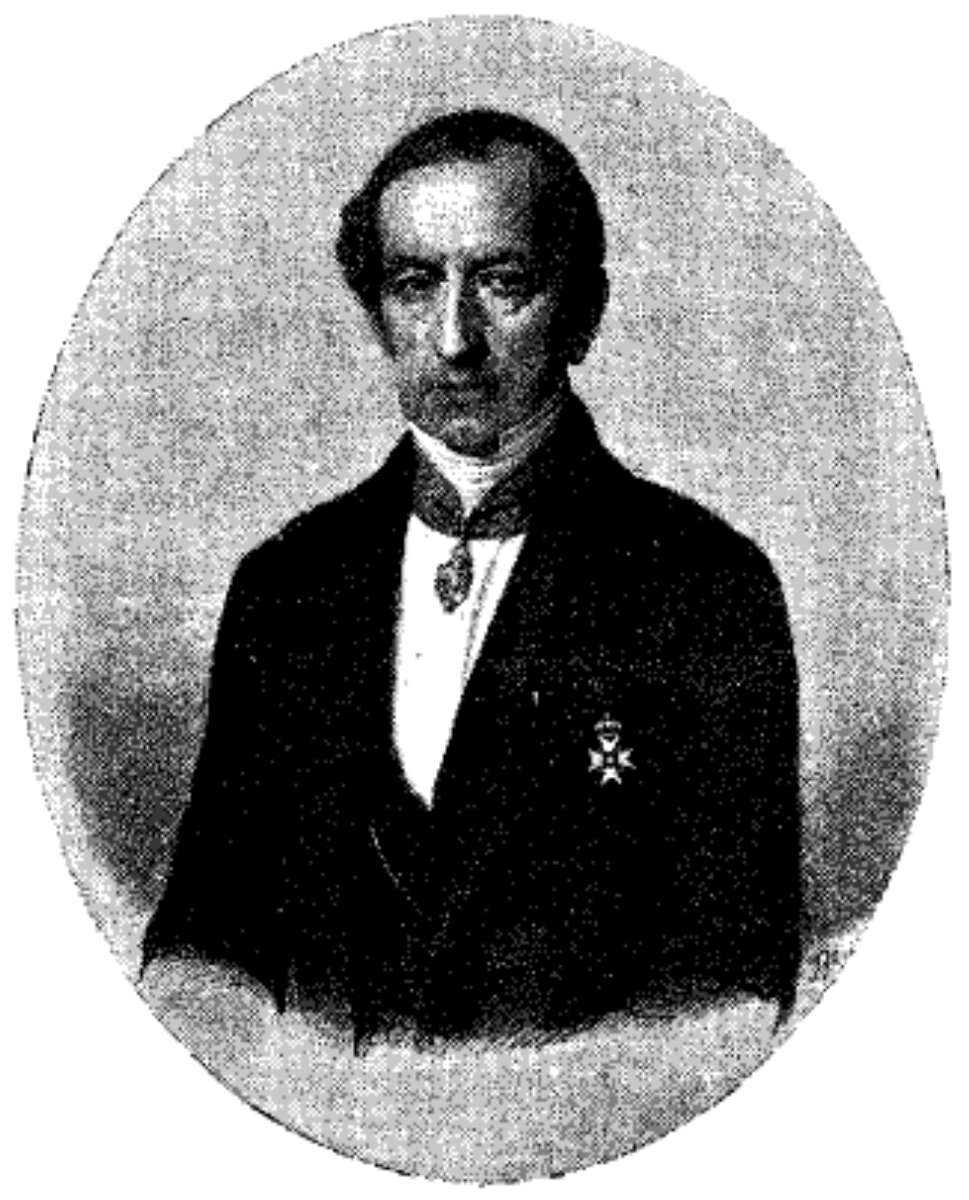
Jeppe Strokirk

Ölsboda Manor was built in the late 1820s by Jeppe Strokirk and architect Fredrik Blom. The manor house's vestibule was inspired by the Rosendal Palace, and the manor house was completed in 1828.

In the 1660s, an ironwork was established on the Lake Ölen by mayor Anders Sten.

In 1772, the properties surrounding what is today Ölsboda Manor was bought by Elias Strokirk. He had a manor house built at this location. The house panelling was painted red. It was not until the 1820s, that construction broke ground for the current manor house.

According to some, the quay at Lake Ölen, close to Ölsboda Manor, was built by Russian prisoners of war.

Jeppe Strokirk inherited the property in 1811 and had a new building built.

In the 1820s, construction broke ground for Ölsboda Manor and the building was completed in 1828.

In 1936, Ölsboda Manor was acquired by a descendant of Jeppe Strokirk, Countess Ebba Hamilton (née Mörner).

Ölsboda Manor is private property as of today, nor is it open to the public.

== See also ==
- List of castles and palaces in Sweden
  - Degernäs Manor
  - Svartå Manor

== Bibliography ==
- Carlsson, Gunilla. (2001) Tre herrgårdar - en jämförelse mellan Svartå, Ölsboda och Krontorp, Visnum.
