= Sven Rosén =

Sven Rosén may refer to:

- Sven Rosén (gymnast) (1887–1963), Swedish gymnast
- Sven Rosén (Pietist) (1708–1750), Radical-Pietistic writer and leader
- Sven Rosén (footballer), Swedish former footballer
