= Surrounded by Idiots =

2012 self-help book by Thomas Erikson

- Author: Thomas Erikson
- Language: Swedish, English
- Genre: Psychology, Self-help
- Publication date: November 10, 2020
- ISBN: 9781785042188

Surrounded by Idiots (Swedish: Omgiven av idioter) is a 2014 self-help book by Swedish author Thomas Erikson. It became an international bestseller, being translated into 55 languages and selling 1.5 million copies worldwide.

The book categorizes people into four personality types using the DISC assessment and is meant to help readers understand and adapt to different behavioral styles in personal and professional interactions.

== Synopsis ==
Surrounded by Idiots explores human behavior through a framework of four personality types, each represented by a color: Red, Yellow, Green, and Blue. These categories claim to help readers understand themselves and others, providing insights into communication styles and interpersonal dynamics. Erikson illustrates how recognizing these types can enhance relationships, both personally and professionally.

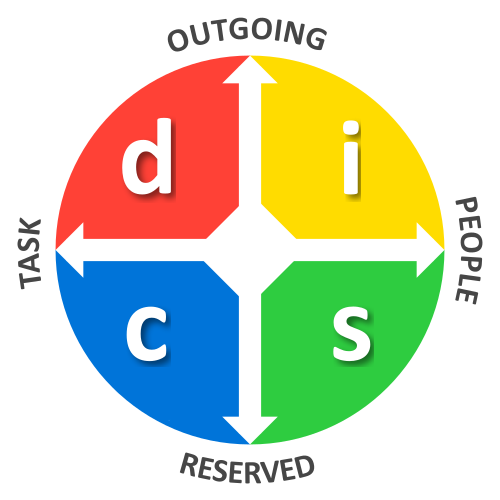
A chart representing the DISC Assessment

The Red personality embodies dominance and assertiveness. Reds are natural leaders who crave control and make quick decisions. While they can be inspiring and decisive, they often come off as aggressive or confrontational to other personality types. Understanding the Red type is crucial for managing conflict and fostering a collaborative environment.

Yellows are the life of the party, characterized by their enthusiasm and sociability. They are creative and energetic, often inspiring others with their charisma. However, their scattered focus can frustrate individuals who prefer structure. By appreciating Yellows for their creativity and positivity, others can better engage and collaborate with them.

Greens represent calmness and reliability, excelling in teamwork. They value loyalty and harmony and often act as peacemakers. However, their aversion to conflict can lead to indecisiveness and difficulty in asserting themselves. Recognizing the strengths and weaknesses of Greens can help others support them in contributing more effectively to group dynamics.

Finally, the Blue personality type is analytical and detail-oriented. Blues seek accuracy and tend to be methodical in their approach, which can be beneficial in problem-solving situations. However, their critical nature may come off as overly judgmental to others. Understanding the Blue type allows for better communication and reduces friction in collaborative efforts.

The book attempts to show the importance of effective communication and empathy. Erikson emphasizes that understanding why people behave the way they do is key to navigating interpersonal dynamics successfully. By learning to identify and adapt to the different personality types, readers can foster stronger, more harmonious relationships in both their personal and professional lives.

== Reception ==
While Surrounded by Idiots was generally well-received by readers, many critics, psychologists, and psychotherapists have labeled the book as nonsense due to the pseudoscientific nature of the DISC assessment, which the book is based on. Critics of the book include Mattias Lundberg, associate professor in psychology at Umeå University. In 2018, the book's author, Thomas Erikson, was awarded the title "Fraudster of the Year" by the Swedish organization Föreningen Vetenskap och Folkbildning. In late 2026, the podcast If Books Could Kill published an episode further criticizing the claims made in Surrounded By Idiots.
