= Elisabet Wittfooth =

Finnish merchant and shipowner

- Born: Elisabet Tottie; 1716; Stockholm
- Died: 1791 (aged 74–75); Turku
- Occupation(s): Merchant and Shipowner
- Years active: 1758-1791
- Spouse(s): Gustaf Adolf Wittfooth (1737-1758, his death)
- Children: 3
- Parents: Thomas Tottie (father); Christina Schönman (mother)

Elisabet Wittfooth née Tottie (1716, Stockholm - 1791, Åbo (Finnish: Turku)) was a Finnish merchant and shipowner.

== Personal life ==
Elisabet Wittfooth was the daughter of tobacco factory owner Thomas Tottie (d. 1724) and Christina Schönman in Stockholm. She moved to Åbo in Finland after her marriage in 1737 to the Finnish merchant shipowner Gustaf Adolf Wittfooth (d. 1758). The couple had three sons, Arvid, Adam and Thomas.

== Career ==
She managed the Wittfooth Trading Company, which was that time was one of the biggest in Finland, from the death of her husband in 1758 until her own death. She managed import and export and owned seven ships and two factories, a sugar factory and a tobacco factory, which she founded in 1763. It was the second tobacco factory in Åbo, and the first to be successful.

From 1758 to 1777 she managed the city hall restaurant of Åbo, the Stadskällaren, (for the last seven years in partnership with Anna Elisabeth Baer): she stopped managing it in 1777, but owned the privilege until 1787. The Stadskällaren was very successful, being the centre of the students and soldiers of Åbo. She worked with the merchant Carl Ekenbom, whom she credited in her will for always "assisting" her, and whom she named guardian of her middle son Adam.

During the Theatre War in 1790, the war lugger Tumlaren was gifted to the royal fleet of King Gustav III of Sweden by a group of female merchants (referred to as 'Merchant Widows') of the city of Åbo, including Anna Elisabeth Baer and Elisabeth Wittfooth.

== Other sources ==
- http://www.blf.fi/artikel.php?id=375
- Biografiskt lexikon för Finland 1. Svenska tiden (2008).
- Vainio-Korhonen, Kirsi: Wittfooth, Elisabet. Kansallisbiografia-verkkojulkaisu. Studia Biographica 4. Helsinki: Suomalaisen Kirjallisuuden Seura, 1997- (viitattu 24.5.2018) URN:NBN:fi-fe20051410 ISSN 1799-4349 (Verkkojulkaisu)
