= Eneryda =

- Location within Kronoberg Location within Sweden
- Coordinates: 56°42′N 14°20′E
- Country: Sweden
- Province: Småland
- County: Kronoberg County
- Municipality: Älmhult Municipality

Area
  - Total: 0.73 km^{2} (0.28 sq mi)

Population (31 December 2010)
  - Total: 338
  - Density: 466/km^{2} (1,210/sq mi)
- Time zone: UTC+1 (CET)
  - Summer (DST): UTC+2 (CEST)

Eneryda is a locality situated in Älmhult Municipality, Kronoberg County, Sweden with 338 inhabitants in 2010.
