= Anna Elisabeth Baer =

18th-century Finnish merchant

- Born: Anna Elisabeth Carlbohm; 1722
- Died: 1799 (aged 76–77)
- Spouse: Anders Baer (1743–1770, his death)
- Children: 13
- Parents: Kristoffer Carlbohm (father); Anna Warg (mother)

Anna Elisabeth Baer née Carlbohm (1722–1799) was a Finnish merchant and shipowner. She was one of the richest merchants in the latter half of the 18th century in Turku, Finland.

== Life ==
Anna Elisabeth Baer was the daughter of the rich merchant and city councillor Kristoffer Carlbohm and Anna Warg of Gamla Karleby.

In 1743, she married the wealthy merchant Anders Baer (1712–1770) of Turku, who was also an elected representative to the Swedish parliament. The couple had thirteen children, seven of whom became adults.

=== Business career ===
She took over the family business (as well as her husband's guild membership) after his death in 1770, and managed it for nearly thirty years after his death. She sent several petitions relating to business to the Swedish Collegium of Commerce. She was a shipowner, owned a merchant company and several properties outside of Turku, as well as parts of a brick factory, a saw mill and a tobacco factory. From 1770 until 1777, she managed the Turku city hall restaurant in companionship with Elisabeth Wittfooth.

After the death of her spouse, she was sued by the tobacco trader Emanuel Tillman for the debt of her late husband, for the unpaid tobacco leaves he had ordered for a tobacco factory in Turku in which he owned an interest. Baer refused to pay the entire amount but claimed that the other part owners of the factory should pay part of the debt. This was contested by the biggest part owner, Jost Joachim Pipping, who demanded to see the Baer account books to verify the purchase had been exclusively that of Anders Baer. The legal dispute lasted for three years, until 1774, when the court decided that all part owners should pay a share of the debt.

During the Theatre War in 1790, the war lugger Tumlaren was gifted to the royal fleet of king Gustav III of Sweden by a group of female merchants (referred to as 'Merchant Widows') of the city of Turku, among them being Anna Elisabeth Baer and Elisabeth Wittfooth.

Anna Elisabeth Baer died a very rich woman in 1799, and left her possessions to her three surviving children.

=== 1771 election ===
Anna Elisabeth Baer wanted to vote in the Riksdag elections in Turku in 1771, and sent a letter to the governor regarding the matter. The petition was sent together with those of the book binder Hedvig Söderman and the tanner Hedvig Ottiliana Richter, both widows who had inherited their businesses from their late husbands, and who all petitioned to vote on the grounds that they were tax paying guild members.

The petition to vote was sent because the election of the burgher city representatives to the Riksdag had already been held, without her having been called to participate in it, despite having the legal right to do so. In the election, Jost Joachim Pipping was elected representative to the Riksdag by the Turku burghers. Pipping was a business rival of Baer, with whom she was involved in a court dispute at the time. The burgher election of Turku was contested by both the Craftsmen's Guild as well as by Baer.

In her protest, she demanded the right to exercise her vote and made the case that because she paid taxes as a burgher, she should have the right to elect her burgher representative, and that if her right to vote was not respected, she feared that her other rights as a businessperson were in danger of eventually being contested in the same way. In her protest, she wrote to the Governor:

"I make these demands for no other reasons or designs than to defend my rights and privileges, without which my Profession and Business Trade could be limited and mistreated, a concern to which I trust upon the consideration of Your Grace."

In Sweden (with Finland) at the time, there was in fact conditional women's suffrage, and women who were tax paying guild members did have the legal right to vote, a fact that Baer may have been aware of. In Sweden, women did vote in the 1771 election if they were taxpaying guild members of legal majority, which Baer herself became when she was widowed: and Finland was at that time a part of Sweden, thus this conditional women's suffrage should have applied in Finland as well. However, this right was contested in Finland, where it was not considered proper for women to appear in the town halls to discuss political issues.

The answer to the petition of 1771 was a refusal from the governor, after having consulted the burgher elders of the city of Turku, regarding their view on the matter. The burgher elders stated that Baer, Söderman and Richter had merely inherited their businesses (and burgher rights) from their late husbands: they had not sworn the burgher oath personally, were thus not 'full members' of the guilds, and thereby they did not have the right to vote, despite being guild members. In his answer to Baer's petition to vote, the governor stated that she had no reason to fear that her business rights should be threatened in any way, but:

"… Mrs Baer wishes to vote for the representatives of the Parliament: this curious matter seemed too ridiculous for the City Elders to answer further. For that reason, and because it seemed likely that Mrs Baer had been seduced to this step, so unexpected for the strength of her intellect and unflattering for her sex, we will give no further reply to her petition in this matter."

The conditional women's suffrage in Sweden (with Finland) was in any case abolished the following year, when the revolution of 1772 abolished the Age of Liberty in favour of absolute monarchy. Nevertheless, the Turku burgher election of 1771 was deemed to be incorrect and a re-election was held, during which Pipping lost his place.
