= Christina Erikson =

Swedish criminal fiction writer

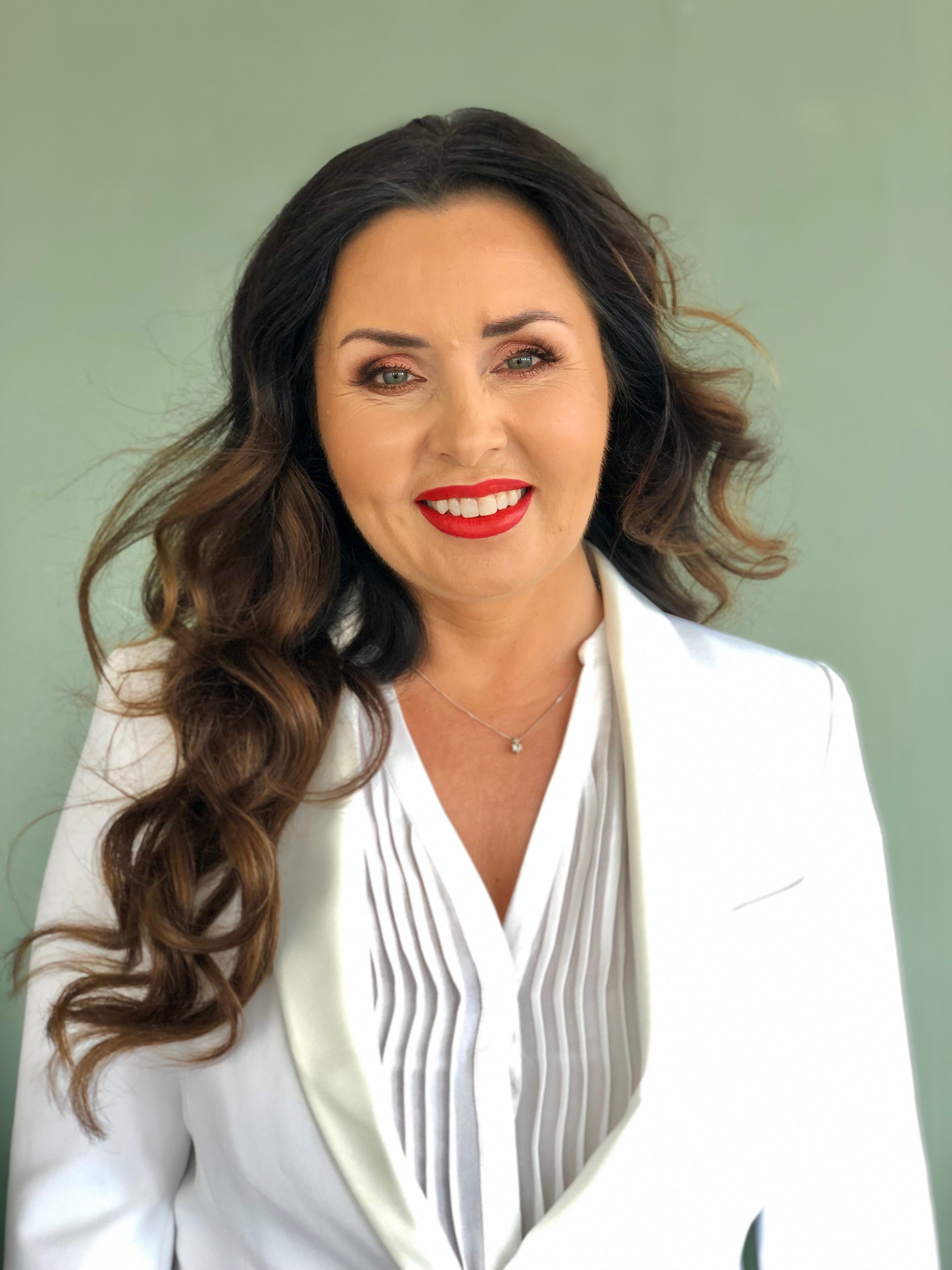
- Christina Erikson, 2019
- Born: February 22, 1973 (age 53); Högsby, Sweden
- Occupation: Novelist
- Writing career
- Language: Swedish
- Genre: Crime

Christina Erikson (née Johansson; born 22 February 1973) is a Swedish crime writer. She is also an operating room nurse and she has a degree in media and communication science.

== Early life ==
Erikson was born on 22 February 1973 in Högsby.

== Career ==
Erikson released her debut novel in 2014 with Morsarvet, and the year after she released the book En god gärning. In 2015, she released the book Av jord är du kommen a book about the fictional character Rita Benson, and in 2017 a second book about Benson was released named Dödgrävarens dotter. In July 2017, Christina Erikson signed a two-year book deal with Bonniers and the first book Din Vän Forsete was released in September 2018.

In 2023, Erikson ventured onto a new genre and began to write romance with her debut title Om du var min.

== Personal life ==
In 2021, Erikson and her husband, fellow writer Thomas Erikson, purchased Svartå Manor. They have two children.

== Bibliography ==
- 2014 – Morsarvet, Hoi Publishers
- 2015 – En god gärning, Litet Publishers
- 2015 – Av jord är du kommen (along with Thomas Erikson), Hoi Publishers
- 2017 – Dödgrävarens dotter (along with Thomas Erikson), HarperCollins Nordic
- 2018 – Din vän Forsete, Albert Bonniers Förlag
- 2019 – Ensamvarg Albert Bonniers Förlag
- 2020 – Den trettonde lärjungen Albert Bonniers Förlag
- 2021 – Debutanten Albert Bonniers Förlag
- 2022 – I skuggan av dig Albert Bonniers Förlag
- 2023 – Jag, Forsete Albert Bonniers Förlag
- 2023 – Om du var min Bookmark Förlag
