= John Geier =

American psychologist

Dr. John George Geier Jr (Flint, Michigan; January 24, 1934 – September 26, 2009) was an American psychologist who worked extensively on the pseudoscientific DISC assessment system which claimed to improve work/life performance.

Dr. Geier had a 40-year career in the assessment process and was known as a pioneer and founder of personnel selection, training and research, and a leader of human assessment. During his career, he developed numerous assessment tools, including the DiSC Personal Profile System, and the Personality Factor Profile, used for more than 50 million people around the world and translated to more than 30 different languages.

== Family background and early years ==
John G. Geier was born to John George Geier, (1900–1967) and Irene E. Bock (1911–1978). John’s father was of Volga-German extraction, and Irene was the daughter of Jewish immigrants from the Austro-Hungarian Empire.

John was a bright student who worked his way through college by assisting his father on painting jobs.

== Education and career ==
John G. Geier graduated from Northwestern College with a major in speech (psychology minor). He excelled in speech and debate and served as senior class vice president. He chose Joshua 1:8 as his verse for the '58 yearbook: "Do not let this Book of the Law depart from your mouth; meditate on it day and night so that you may be careful to do everything written in it. Then you will be prosperous and successful."

He earned a master in speech communication (educational psychology & statistics minor) and a Ph.D. in communication theory (organizational behavior/public administration minor) at the University of Minnesota. While attending the university, he worked at Northwestern College as an instructor, then as assistant to the president and director of public relations.

Dr. Geier's career included co-founder of the health ecology divisions, director of behavioral sciences and management education, and dean of the summer school at the University of Minnesota, dean of the extended university, University of Arizona, adjunct professor at the University of Michigan Graduate School of Business where he taught the internationally renowned Manager of Managers seminar, and work as a researcher, author and consultant.

His honors included Outstanding Teacher of the Year (health sciences), University of Minnesota Distinguished Service Award, Citicorp Executive Development Center; and Special Appreciation Award, National Telemarketing Association. He conducted research for the U.S. Health Commission, University of Minnesota Medical School, Oldsmobile and IBM Corp.

Dr Geier's professional and community participation included founder/president of Outreach Home for the Mentally Retarded (now the Portland Residence), designer and instructor for sensitivity training courses for Minneapolis and Saint Paul police departments, and lead instructor for the Allie Q. Brown Afro-American Special School.
