= Diö =

- Location within Kronoberg Location within Sweden
- Coordinates: 56°38′N 14°13′E
- Country: Sweden
- Province: Småland
- County: Kronoberg County
- Municipality: Älmhult Municipality

Area
  - Total: 1.57 km^{2} (0.61 sq mi)

Population (31 December 2010)
  - Total: 899
  - Density: 572/km^{2} (1,480/sq mi)
- Time zone: UTC+1 (CET)
  - Summer (DST): UTC+2 (CEST)

Diö (Swedish: [ˈdîːœ]) is a locality situated in Älmhult Municipality, Kronoberg County, Sweden with 899 inhabitants in 2010.

Diö is situated 10 km north of the town Älmhult.

Diö's most important employer is the wheelchair manufacturer Rea Stolen Invacare. The area is also home to the Gemla Möbel AB furniture factory.

Diö Hockey, playing in the Swedish third division, is the village's most famous sports team.
