= Hanna Lindmark =

Swedish businesswoman (1860–1941)

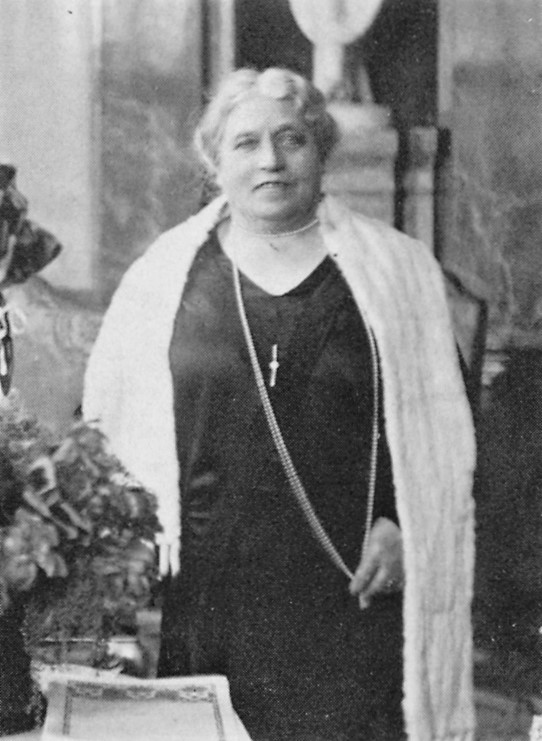
- Born: Sara Johanna Nilsdotter; 24 November 1860; Arnäs, Ångermanland, Sweden
- Died: 15 November 1941 (aged 80); Stockholm, Sweden
- Occupations: Entrepreneur, founder of Margaretaskolorna
- Spouse: Axel Lindmark (m. 1904; died 1935)

Hanna Lindmark (24 November 1860 – 15 November 1941) was a Swedish entrepreneur, educator, and founder of home economics schools called Margaretaskolan. Created to provide girls with an education in preparing quality, home-cooked meals as well as in nutrition, hygiene, and Christianity, her schools became a chain of restaurants, shops, and banquet halls. For her efforts as a teacher, she was awarded the Illis quorum by the King of Sweden in 1927.

== Biography ==
Born in Arnäs, Ångermanland, Sweden, Lindmark grew up in difficult circumstances. Her mother, Cajsa Brita Persdotter, died in childbirth in 1869, the same year that Sweden was struck by crop failure and famine during the Swedish famine of 1867–1869. The family became so poor that at the age of nine, she was sold at a child auction to a person in her home parish of Arnäs who took her in for the lowest price. Until she turned 15, she was auctioned off annually to various foster parents. Her father Nils Olofsson, a local pauper, was married three times and had 22 children, ten of whom survived.

Lindmark decided early on to work her way out of poverty. An important inspiration was Anna Johansdotter Norbäck, known as Mother Anna. Norbäck was the founder of the Annanite church in Arnäs and her free congregation often visited Lindmark. This laid the foundation for Lindmark's strong faith in God and her dream of becoming a missionary. In one home she learned to read and write, and as a maidservant in the foster homes she was also allowed to cook and quickly became very appreciated. Eventually, she was employed as a cook by wealthy farmers, priests and merchants and as a housekeeper for the photographer Adele Kindlund in Östersund, Sweden. She arrived there at the age of 36 and also found Kindlund a role model. Lindmark realized that a woman could control her own life and was inspired to take up a profession. In 1898, she used her savings to attend a course at Elsa Borg's Bible Women's Home in Vita Bergen, Stockholm. However, her savings only lasted one semester and she had to focus on cooking instead.

== Career ==
In 1899, Lindmark began her career as the manager of the YMCA's newly opened restaurant in Östersund. Her talents as an organizer and restaurateur resulted in the restaurant's success, which she also took over. After just one year, she was able to expand, hire new staff and demand better facilities. One of the guests was the widower Axel Lindmark, a surveyor in the Swedish military's mapping division, who came to the restaurant with his children Oscar, Aimée and Robert. The two married in 1904 and began a happy marriage and a thriving work team. Hanna Lindmark quickly came up with her business idea, which was based on four pillars and was successful for more than 70 years. The first component was inspired by what she had learned as a nine-year-old maid. The goal was to teach young, Christian girls how to prepare high-quality Swedish home cooking. The girls were also instructed in Christianity, ethics, hygiene and nutrition. Those who were skilled enough were promised work with Lindmark after the training. Lindmark's second idea was that food should be sold fresh daily in shops, making her the first to introduce take-out in Sweden, long before the concept existed. The third basic idea was a restaurant for Christian families who wanted to eat undisturbed by drunken guests in smoky rooms. The fourth idea was a banquet hall where people could celebrate birthdays, weddings, funerals and other parties.

=== Margaretaskolan ===
In 1905, the Lindmarks moved to Norrköping and opened the first Margaretaskolan ('Margareta School'), a home economics school named after Princess (later Crown Princess) Margaret. Margaretaskolan was a success. The timing coincided with Norrköping's large art and industry exhibition in 1906, which created a demand for dining establishments. This was followed by her opening a location in Stockholm just in time for the 1912 Olympics and in Gothenburg in 1923 in time for the Jubilee Exhibition. Step by step, she established herself around the country, including in Malmö, Linköping, Borås, Jönköping, Västerås. Örebro, Lund, Helsingborg and Tranås. Margaretaskolan became a nationwide chain of shops, restaurants and banquet halls. Lindmark hired only unmarried women and Christian girls lined up to enter the school. Lonely men came to eat in the cafeteria where they could also buy cabbage rolls and herring balls to take home.

Throughout the years, Margaretaskolan maintained its high quality, largely due to how well the couple complemented each other. Axel, who was pedantic and careful, took care of accounting and administration, while Hanna was the outgoing and dynamic one who inspected the kitchen, hygiene and tasted the food. She also added new elements to the curriculum, such as nutrition, and was the driving force behind the whole enterprise.

=== Investments ===
As the business grew and became increasingly profitable, Lindmark began to invest in real estate. In 1922, she bought Steninge Palace in Märsta near Stockholm, giving her a significant landholding. The barn was the largest of its kind in Sweden and had 170 cows that provided Lindmark with dairy products; 28 greenhouses grew strawberries, tomatoes and grapes.

In 1923, Lindmark bought the Dickson Palace in Gothenburg. The city was planning a large industrial fair and she wanted to open a Margaretaskolan in the city. When she was awarded the Illis quorum award in 1927, she had long been respected in the Christian entrepreneurial community. She received the medal "for her efforts as a teacher", which was a triumph as she had never attended school herself. In 1933, the couple bought the Mauritzberg Castle on Vikbolandet. Her own locally produced goods on all the properties made the business less vulnerable to the shortage of goods in the 1930s. Another reason why Lindmark emerged almost unscathed from the economic crisis of the 1930s was, in her own words, that she had never invested in stocks.

At the age of 71, she wanted to continue expanding and Steninge was sold to free up capital for the jewel of her empire. In 1933, she became Torsten Kreuger's first tenant in the Citypalatset building at Norrmalmstorg in Stockholm, demonstrating boldness and modern ideas. In addition to the usual concept of the Margaretaskolan, Lindmark established a hotel business there. With her steady business concept and her forward-thinking but flexible management, she was always able to adapt her business. If the banquet halls faltered in the face of declining demand, she stepped up her retail operations instead.

=== After her death ===
Hanna's free church upbringing and Axel's background in the Church of Sweden contributed to the couple's shared interest in bringing together different Christian denominations. She played an active role in ecumenism by gathering representatives from different camps for conferences. Each year, Margaretaskolan donated ten percent of its profits to four missionary societies. This was her way of compensating for not becoming a missionary herself.

After her husband's death in 1935, Lindmark remained active and, at the age of 80, ran Margaretaskolan until 1941, when she died of pneumonia. She left behind a well-run and profitable business. Her original plan was to have the headmistress of each school receive an inheritance, but she instead bequeathed her large fortune, the properties and all the Margareta Schools to the Swedish Church Mission, the Swedish Baptist Mission, the Mission Covenant Church of Sweden and the Swedish Mission in China. This proved to be fatal as one of the executives embezzled the organization's funds, which resulted in the demise of Margaretaskolan. In 1977, the last school was closed and the company was liquidated. The Lindmarks are buried at Norra begravningsplatsen outside Stockholm.
