= Degernäs Manor =

Coordinates: 59°15′14″N 14°27′12″E

- Degernäs herrgård
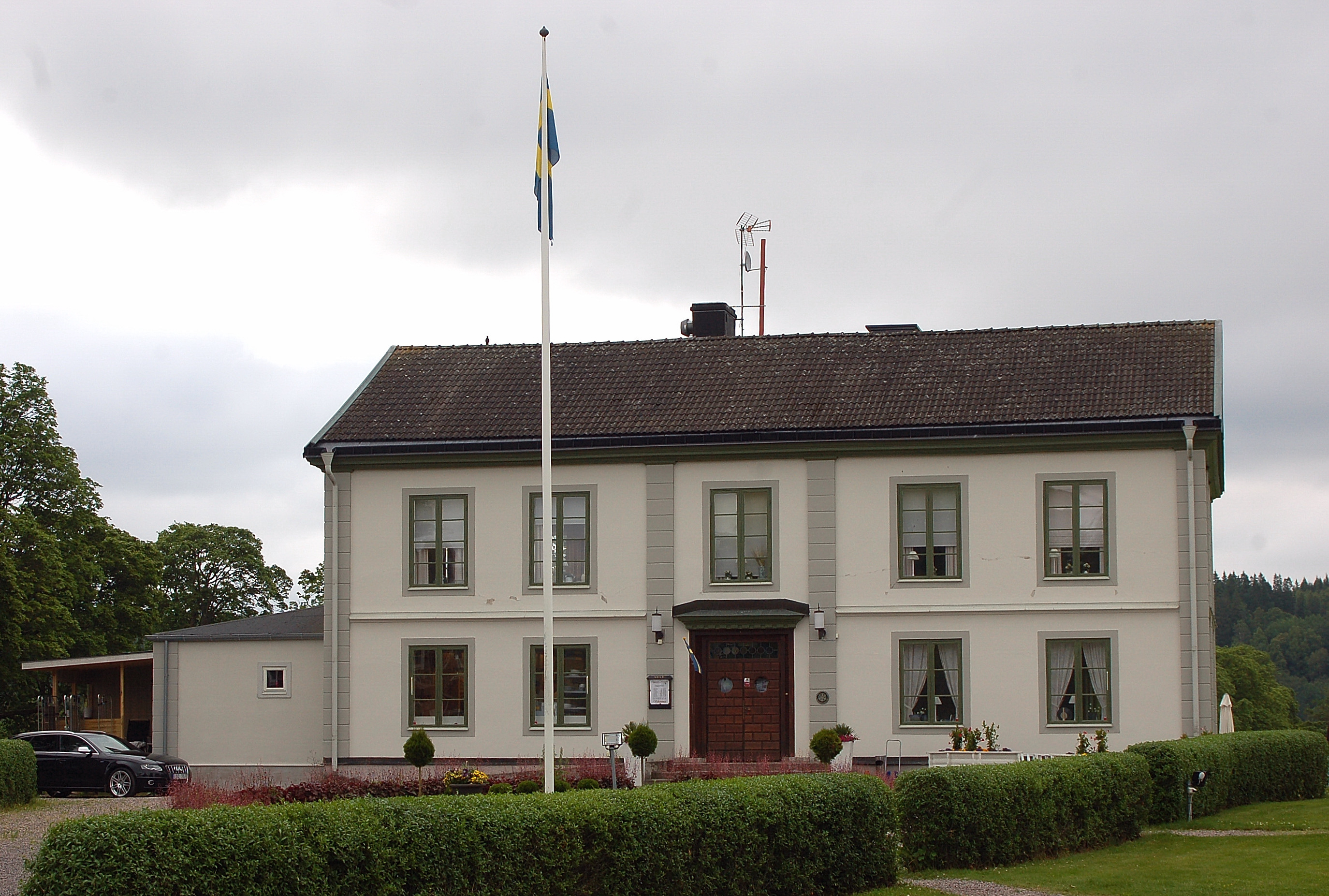
- Degernäs Manor in 2015
- Interactive map of the Degernäs Manor area

General information
- Type: Manor house
- Location: Degerfors, Sweden

Website
- Link

Degernäs Manor (Swedish: Degernäs herrgård) is a manor house located at the southernmost tip of lake Möckeln in Degerfors Municipality, Örebro County. The manor house is surrounded by Degerfors golf course.

== History ==
The building and its surroundings has traditionally been associated with Degerfors Ironworks and the Camitz family since the 17th century. J. Camitz enabled the creation of a park and a corps de logis at the estate.

The manor house has ever since its completion, and the era of the Camitz family, been inhabited by the different managers of the local ironwork. Including members of Swedish aristocratic families, e.g. the Camitz, Strokirk and af Chapman families.

In 1936, John Bengtson acquired the estate.

For some time during the 1930s, its park was used as a site for scouting, made possible by the Bengtson family.

== See also ==
- List of castles and palaces in Sweden
  - Svartå Manor
  - Ölsboda Manor

== Cited works ==
- von Strussenfelt, Gunhild (1937). Degernäs : en lantegendom med 1600-talsanor (PDF) (in Swedish). Archived from the original (PDF) on 2022-10-24.
