= Delary =

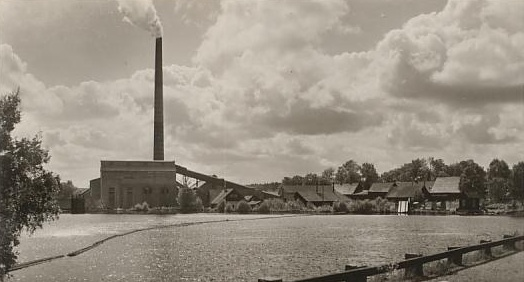
- Delary in 1943

- Location within Kronoberg Location within Sweden
- Coordinates: 56°33′N 13°57′E
- Country: Sweden
- Province: Småland
- County: Kronoberg County
- Municipality: Älmhult Municipality

Area
  - Total: 0.57 km^{2} (0.22 sq mi)

Population (31 December 2010)
  - Total: 222
  - Density: 391/km^{2} (1,010/sq mi)
- Time zone: UTC+1 (CET)
  - Summer (DST): UTC+2 (CEST)

Delary is a locality situated in Älmhult Municipality, Kronoberg County, Sweden with 222 inhabitants in 2010.
