= Bjurum =

Swedish manor

Coordinates: 58°15′46″N 13°28′34″E

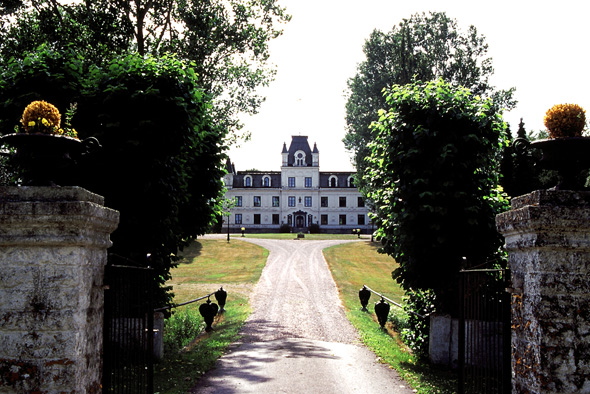
Stora Bjurum.

The Bjurum manor, also known as Stora Bjurum (Grand Bjurum) or Stora Bjurum herrgård (Grand Bjurum manor), is a Swedish manor located in Västergötland. It is one of the largest in the country. Renowned lake Hornborgasjön is located in the manor's lands. The Falköping town is some 11 kilometers south of Bjurum. Earlier the manor contained the area of a whole parish, now some 2500 hectares. It has a long history as an established entity, starting from the Middle Ages.

The original manor consisted of four separate wings centered on a square. Three of the wings burned down in the 1750s and the remaining wing was expanded to a single manor house by major Carl Georg Lillie. The current main building is a stone building from 1870, drawn by Helgo Zettervall. It is surrounded by a garden and a park.

== History ==
Stora Bjurum was originally known as Byurum and Biureem; from biur, an old word for beaver. The manor is mentioned in 1431, when it was owned by the riksråd and nobleman Karl Ormsson Gumsehuvud, father-in-law of Charles VIII of Sweden, who left it to his grandchild princess Magdalena of Sweden. Being without own surviving children, she ceded the property in 1491 to her niece, lady Kerstin Eriksdatter Gyldenstierne, a half-Danish, surpassing all her brothers. Lady Kerstin was married with lord Hans Aagesen Thott, another Danish-born noble. The couple's son Lord Åke Hansson Tott, marshal of Sweden, was the next owner. He was executed in 1510 by the king of Denmark. Through his sister, the manor passed to the Soop family and, in the late 17th century, to the Stenbock family. In the 1730s, the manor was owned by count Erik Fredrik Stenbock (1686-1739) and came to be infamous in contemporary Sweden as the scene of the Passionsspelen på Stora Bjurum, supported by his wife Eva Margareta Clerck. Shortly thereafter, it came to be owned by major Carl Georg Lillie, who had the manor reconstructed in the 1750s. His son Brynte Lillie sold Stora Bjurum to majoren G. Soop in 1807. The manor changed ownership numerous times during the 19th century.
