= Liatorp =

- Location within Kronoberg Location within Sweden
- Coordinates: 56°40′N 14°16′E
- Country: Sweden
- Province: Småland
- County: Kronoberg County
- Municipality: Älmhult Municipality

Area
  - Total: 0.85 km^{2} (0.33 sq mi)

Population (2020)
  - Total: 540
  - Density: 651/km^{2} (1,690/sq mi)
- Time zone: UTC+1 (CET)
  - Summer (DST): UTC+2 (CEST)

Liatorp is a locality situated in Älmhult Municipality, Kronoberg County, Sweden with 540 inhabitants in 2020.
