= Degerfors =

- Locality
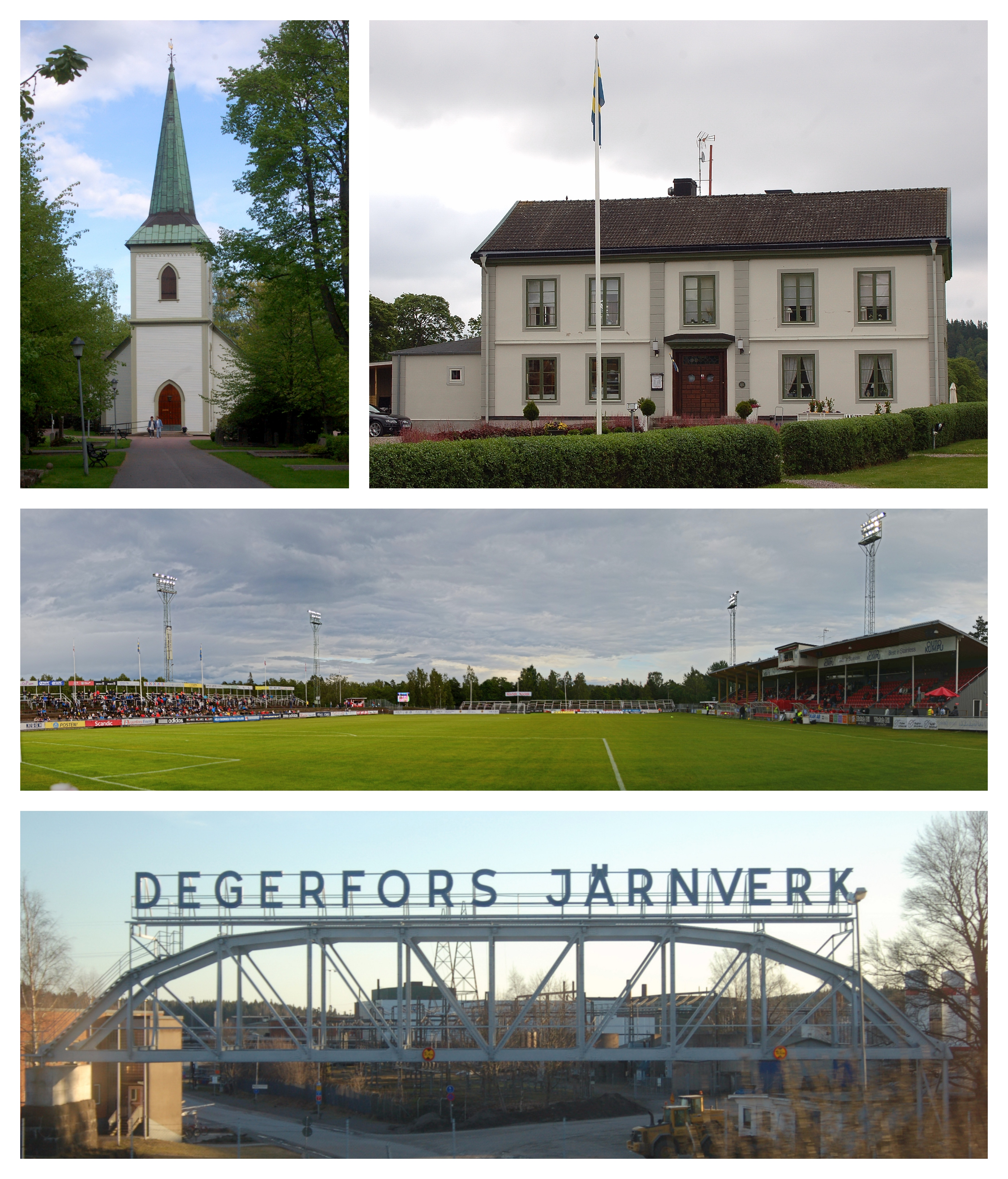
- Degerfors Church, Degernäs Manor, Stora Valla and the Degerfors Works

- Location within Örebro Location within Sweden
- Coordinates: 59°14′10″N 14°25′47″E
- Country: Sweden
- Province: Värmland
- County: Örebro County
- Municipality: Degerfors Municipality

Area
  - Total: 7.14 km^{2} (2.76 sq mi)

Population (31 December 2010)
  - Total: 7,160
  - Density: 1,003/km^{2} (2,600/sq mi)
- Time zone: UTC+1 (CET)
  - Summer (DST): UTC+2 (CEST)

Degerfors (Swedish pronunciation: [ˈdêːɡɛrˌfɔʂ]) is a locality and the seat of Degerfors Municipality, Örebro County, Sweden, with 7,160 inhabitants in 2010. Degerfors is the sixth-largest city in Örebro County. It is located at the southern shore of lake Möckeln, 13 km (8 mi) south of neighboring Karlskoga.

Degerfors evolved around the ironworks, that is nowadays owned by the Finnish conglomerate Outokumpu Oyj. It is also home to the football club Degerfors IF, which is playing in the first tier of Swedish football, Allsvenskan.

== History ==
Degerfors has traditionally been an industrial community closely connected to the large ironworks, associated with members of the Camitz family. The settlement (originally called Johannelund) grew up around this industry and got the status of a municipalsamhälle (a type of borough within a municipality) in 1912. Today it acts as seat of the larger Degerfors Municipality.

In the 1870s, a group of people native to the Degerfors-area emigrated to the Ural region (then part of the Russian Empire).

== Economy ==
The steelworks is now owned by the Finnish conglomerate Outokumpu Oyj.

The location has a railway station and a narrow-gauge railway connecting it with Bredsjö, the Bredsjö–Degerfors Järnväg.

Tourists to the region usually stop at the Sveafallen nature reserve.

== Sveafallen ==
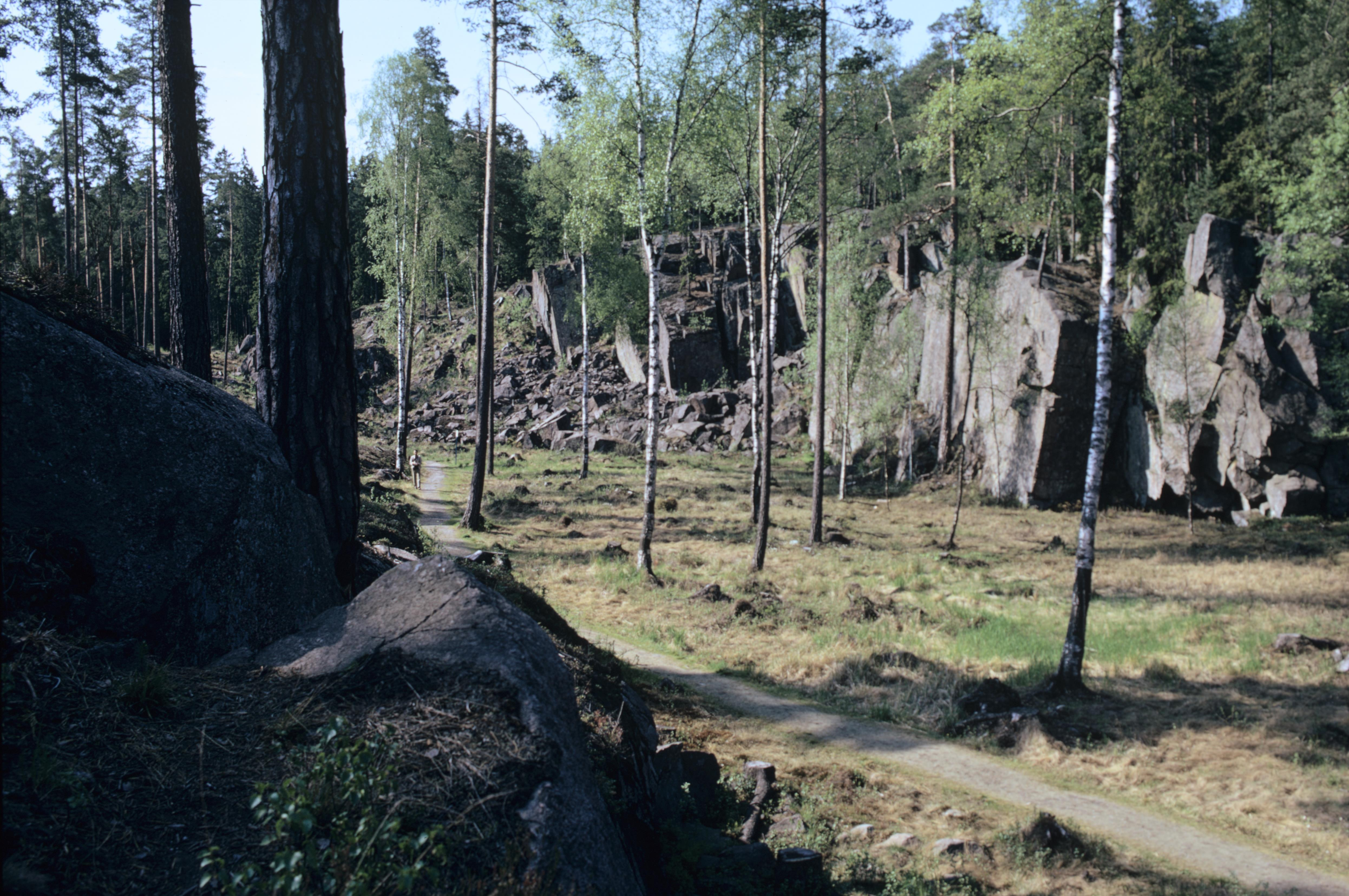
Bergtjärnsdalen

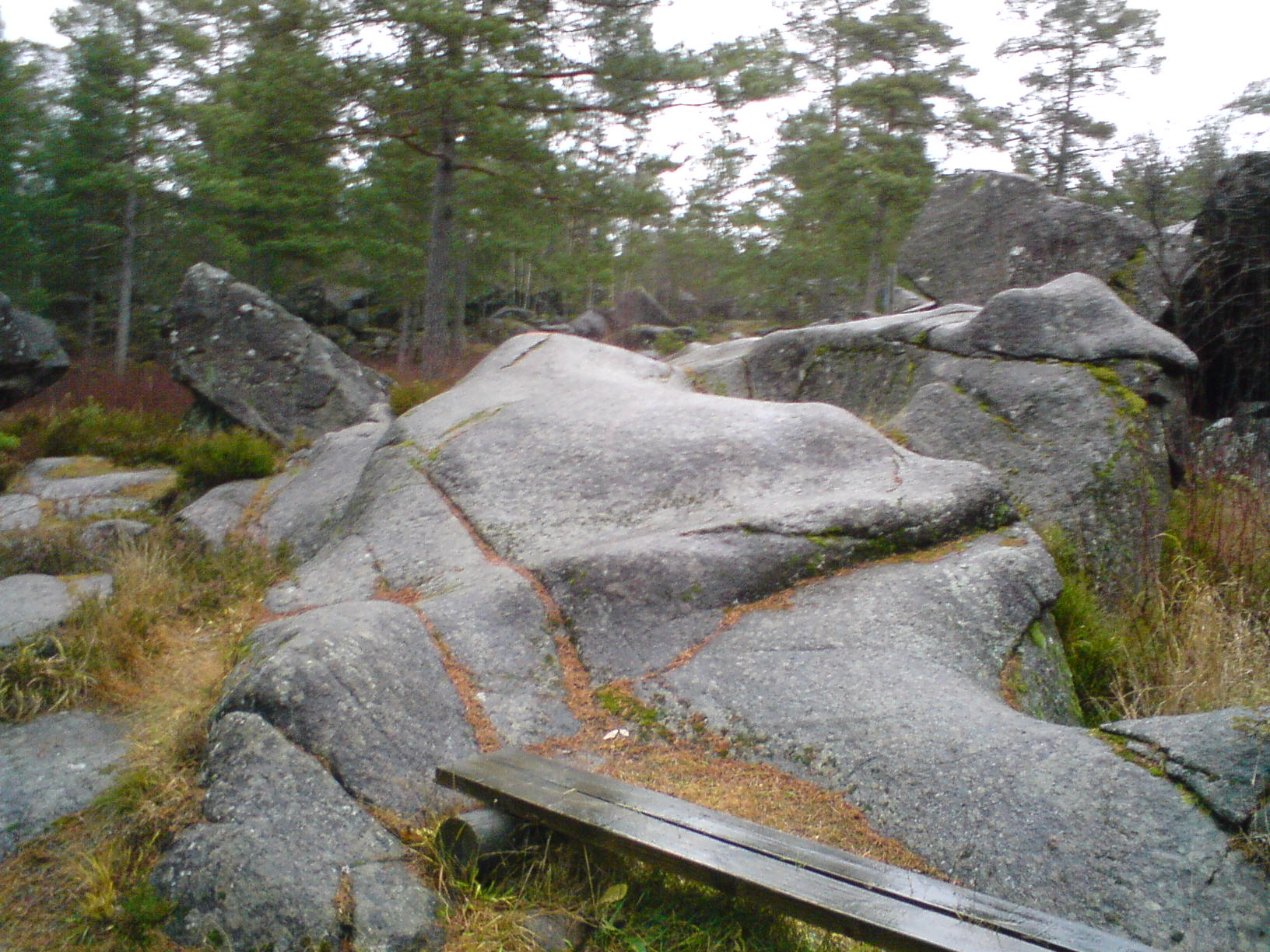
Sveafallen

Degerfors is the site of Sveafallen, a geological landscape of small canyons and giant's kettles. Immediately south of Degerfors lies the nature reserve of Sveafallen. The reserve contains a series of small canyons as well as numerous and large giant's kettles. Sveafallen was long held to be the outlet of the Ancylus Lake, a fresh-water predecessor to the Baltic Sea. The site was first discovered in 1923 by Lennart von Post being the focus of a protracted and sometimes bitter scientific debate that involved not only von Post but also figures such as Henrik Munthe, Astrid Cleve and Curt Fredén. The site was initially proposed to be the dry remnant of a dramatic river or waterfall comparable to Niagara Falls. Research by Curt Fredén cast well founded doubts on this view, with the final demise being a 1981 study by Birgitta Ericsson et al showing that the giant's kettles in the area are older than the Ancylus Lake. Sveafallen is now believed to have formed by meltwater streams under the Fennoscandian ice sheet.

== Sports ==
Nationally, Degerfors is best known for the football team Degerfors IF. Sven-Göran Eriksson moved to Degerfors and took over as manager of the club from New Year's Day 1977. Despite the relatively small size of the town, Degerfors has always had strong local support, and played a total of 29 years in the highest division Allsvenskan. In 1997 the team were relegated and were playing in the second highest Swedish league, Superettan until they achieved promotion back to Allsvenskan (highest Swedish league) in 2020.

Another sports club located in Degerfors is Strömtorps IK.
