= Älmhult Municipality =

Älmhult Municipality Älmhults kommun
- Municipality
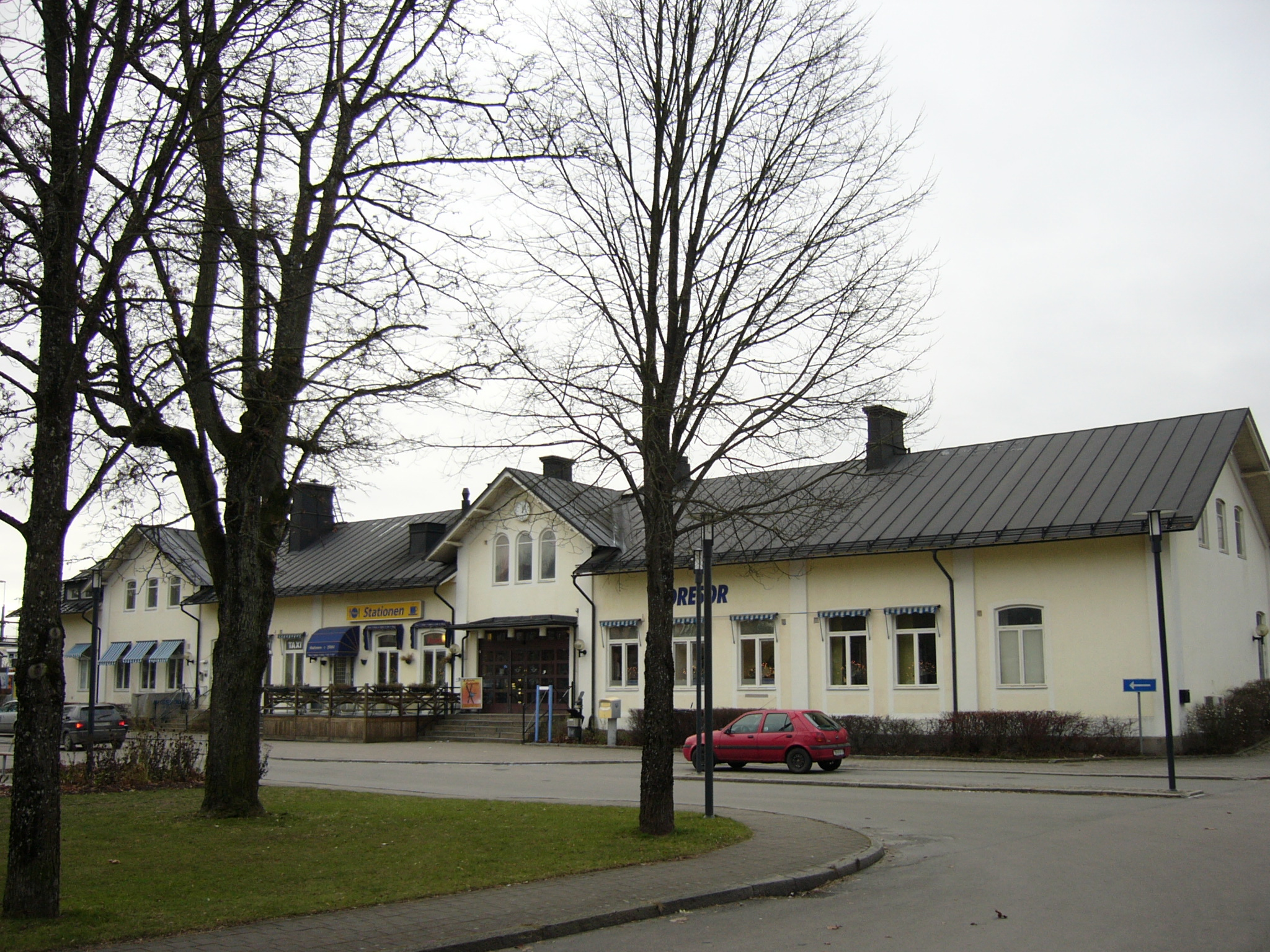
- Älmhult railway station

- Coat of arms

- Coordinates: 56°33′N 14°08′E
- Country: Sweden
- County: Kronoberg County
- Seat: Älmhult

Area
  - Total: 978.3667 km^{2} (377.7495 sq mi)
  - Land: 890.9267 km^{2} (343.9887 sq mi)
  - Water: 87.44 km^{2} (33.76 sq mi)
- Area as of 1 January 2014.

Population (30 June 2025)
  - Total: 17,639
  - Density: 19.798/km^{2} (51.278/sq mi)
- Time zone: UTC+1 (CET)
  - Summer (DST): UTC+2 (CEST)
- ISO 3166 code: SE
- Province: Småland
- Municipal code: 0765
- Website: www.almhult.se

Älmhult Municipality (Swedish: Älmhults kommun) is a municipality in central Kronoberg County in southern Sweden. The town of Älmhult is its seat.

In 1901, Älmhult was detached from Stenbrohult and made a market town (köping). The present municipality was created by the local government reform of 1971, when Älmhult was amalgamated with the surrounding rural municipalities.

Of historical significance is that the botanist Carl von Linné was born and grew up in the parish of Stenbrohult in the early 18th century. Today, the estate on which he was born and lived his first months has been turned into a museum at Råshult and is still surrounded by the same meadows and fields as 300 years ago.

Allegedly, the area has a variety of different specimens of plants, likely to trigger the interest of a botanical minded youngster. The geography is probably not distinguished from its neighbouring municipalities, however. Like all other Småland municipalities, it contains a variety of lakes, streams and especially forests.

The first IKEA store was opened in Älmhult by Ingvar Kamprad, who grew up in the municipality.

== Localities ==
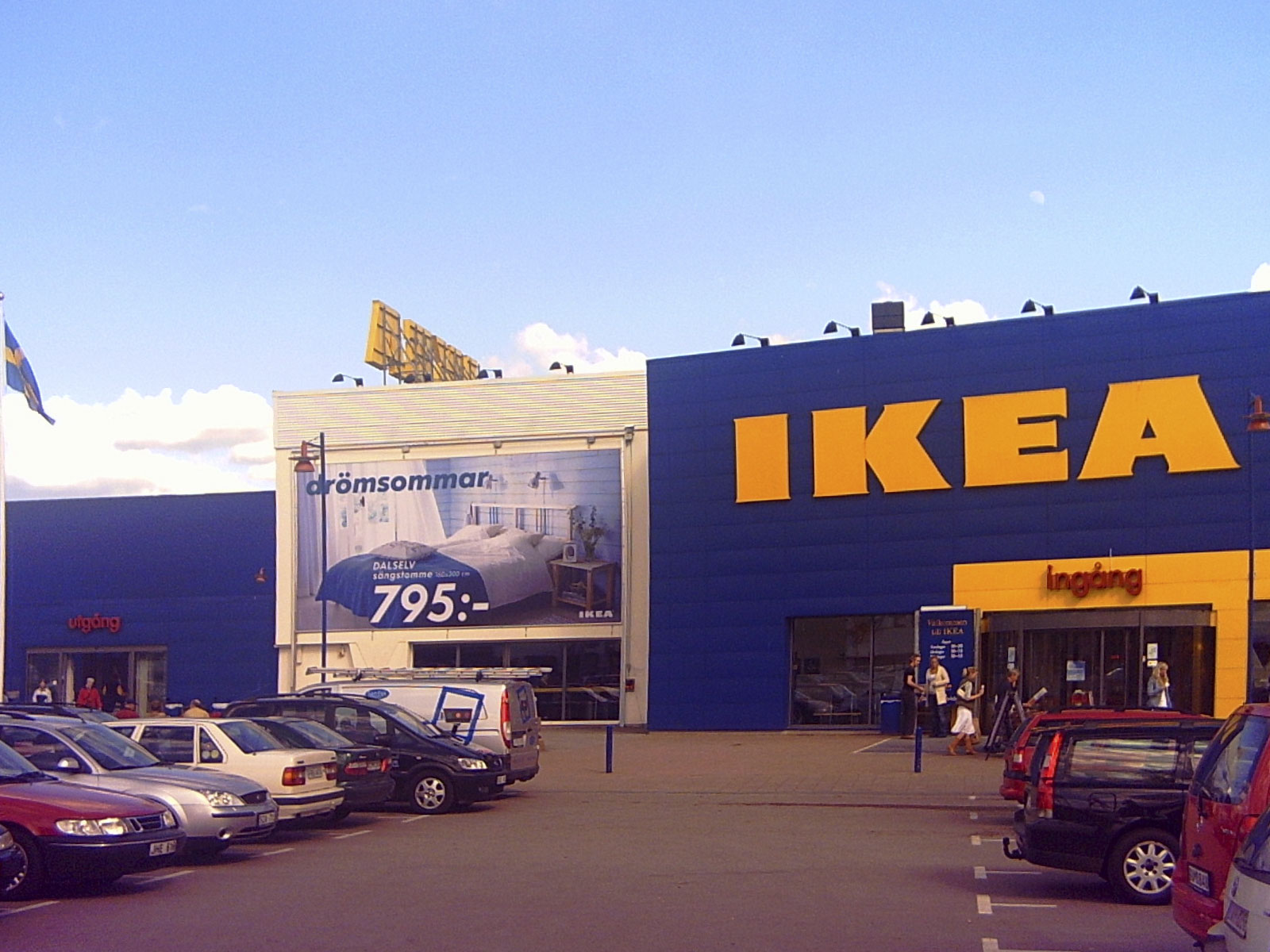
Ikea in Älmhult, 2005

There are 5 urban areas (also called a Tätort or locality) in Älmhult Municipality.

In the table the localities are listed according to the size of the population as of December 31, 2014. The municipal seat is in bold characters.

#	Locality	Population
1	**Älmhult**	9,374
2	Diö	899
3	Liatorp	527
4	Eneryda	323
5	Delary	208

== Demographics ==
This is a demographic table based on Älmhult Municipality's electoral districts in the 2022 Swedish general election sourced from SVT's election platform, in turn taken from SCB official statistics.

In total there were 17,950 residents, including 12,132 Swedish citizens of voting age. 45.3% voted for the left coalition and 53.5% for the right coalition. Indicators are in percentage points except population totals and income.

Location	Residents	Citizen adults	Left vote	Right vote	Employed	Swedish parents	Foreign heritage	Income SEK	Degree
Location			%	%					
Centrum	1,421	987	50.1	49.1	76	62	38	23,316	42
Diö-Stenbrohult	1,918	1,363	43.9	55.2	84	82	18	26,965	38
Froafälle	1,576	1,131	47.0	51.7	82	70	30	26,864	39
Gemön-Möckeln	1,839	1,302	48.3	51.0	84	65	35	28,116	43
Göteryd	1,594	1,188	34.3	64.3	82	83	17	24,561	32
Haganäs	2,508	1,224	58.2	38.9	58	29	71	16,449	42
Häradsbäck	1,368	1,031	33.4	65.1	87	88	12	25,949	35
Klöxhult	2,174	1,395	45.6	53.6	85	71	29	31,303	47
Norregård	1,850	1,212	45.9	53.9	89	71	29	34,917	57
Virestad-Eneryda	1,702	1,299	46.5	52.3	83	84	16	24,702	30
Source: SVT

== Notable natives ==
- Carl Linnaeus
- Ingvar Kamprad
