= Sven Rosén (Pietist) =

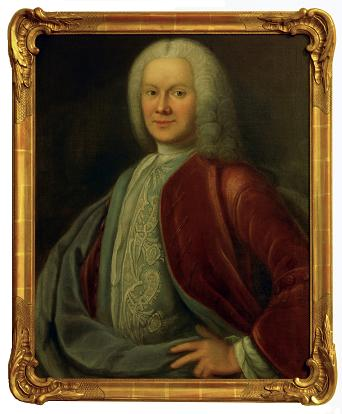
Portrait of Sven Rosén's brother Nils Rosén von Rosenstein (1706–1773). As there were only two years between the brothers, this portrait could give a fairly good resemblance of Sven Rosén.

Sven Rosén (1708–1750) was a Radical-Pietistic writer and leader.

== Radical Pietism ==
Through his acquaintance with Christians influenced by Johann Konrad Dippel, such as Carl Michael von Strokirch and others, and by diligent studies of mystical Christian works, Rosén was brought into the Radical Pietism, where he, after some soul struggling, joined the so-called Gråkoltarna ("gray robes"), who held mystical-apocalyptic and schismatic gatherings (forbidden by law in Sweden at that time), in the house of the widow of the Dutch artist Jan van den Aveelen.

When some of the participants were arrested and imprisoned, friends of Rosén sent him to Riga (then part of the Swedish Empire), where he, as in Copenhagen at his journey home 1732, met with the Moravian Brethren movement, which for a while had a calming influence on him.

Back in Stockholm in 1735, he again joined the radicals among the Pietists, and became the leader for the first free congregation in Sweden, the "Philadelphian Society". Through this position he also became the accepted leader for all the Radical Pietists in the country.

Soon the authorities started to prosecute the small community-living congregation. Rosén's writing was one of the causes, in which he with great conviction pleaded for freedom of religion. During the trial he wrote several writings to his defence, which later were illegally printed and spread over the country, read as Christian literature by the revived followers.

As a result of the trial, the congregation was crushed, and Sven Rosén was sentenced to lifelong exile. At January 28, 1741, he was put on a prisoner wagon, to be brought all the way to the southern coast of Sweden, where a ship would take him over to Denmark. At every stop during the long and cold journey, Pietists came to say farewell to their beloved leader, and he preached to them and to large gatherings of people, from the prisoner wagon, to which he was chained. Some of his dearest friends from the passed towns joined and walked beside him, so that he always had care and comfort from believers.

== Exile ==
From Denmark, Rosén first travelled to Altona, where he stayed for two years, occupied with translating spiritual works into Swedish, among which was a Quietistic work by Jean de Bernieres Louvigni. He also met and became a friend to the German Pietist Gerhard Tersteegen.

In 1743 he was in London to prepare sanctuary for other exiled Swedish brethren. Here he met the Wesley brothers, and again came in contact with the Moravian brethren. Back in Germany 1743, he joined the Moravian Church, whose mission in Sweden now came under his direction, with the result that many radical Pietists joined the Moravians.

After having pleaded to the Swedish king for a return to Sweden in 1745, (which he was denied), he was sent to Pennsylvania in North America in 1746, where he had a blessed, short time preaching and working in the surrounding areas among fellow Christian believers. He married and had some children, but fell ill and died 1750.

The development of Sven Rosén was typical of the strong religious confrontational time in which he lived, and which, due to the hardness of the political conditions, wouldn't let his rich gifts and deeply religious mind work in freedom in the Swedish Church. The Nordisk familjebok calls him "without doubt one of Swedish religiosity's noblest and finest persons".

== Literature ==
- Emanuel Linderholm, "Sven Rosén och hans insats i frihetstidens radikala pietism", 1911.
- Emanuel Linderholm, "Sven Roséns skrifter och brev", 1910.
- Nathan Odenvik, "Sven Rosén - en trosfrihetens martyr i Sverige under 1700-talet", 1944.
- Sven Roséns dagbok. Utgiven och kommenterad av Nathan Odenvik. (1948)

== See also ==
- Pietism
- Radical Pietism
- Moravian Church
