= Ulf Camitz =

Swedish footballer

Personal information
- Full name: Ulf Göran Mikael Camitz
- Date of birth: 25 October 1960 (age 66)
- Position: Midfielder

Senior career*
Years	Team	Apps	(Gls)
1981	Varberg		
1982–1983	Åtvidaberg		
1984	GAIS		
1985	Kvik Halden		
1986–1993	Strømsgodset		
1994	Sandefjord		
1995–1999	Lofoten		
2000–2002	Fauske/Sprint		

Managerial career
- 1995–1998: Lofoten
- 2000–2002: Fauske/Sprint
- 2003: Steigen
- 2007: Grand Bodø
- * Club domestic league appearances and goals

Ulf Camitz (born 25 October 1960) is a Swedish retired football midfielder and later manager.

Playing for several modest teams in Sweden and Norway, he also played first-tier football for Strømsgodset until they were relegated in 1991. After one year in Sandefjord he travelled north to Lofoten in 1995. Leading Lofoten as a player-manager to an unprecedented spell in the 1999 1. divisjon, he was sacked post-promotion for lacking formal qualifications.

In 2000 he moved to Fauske/Sprint as manager. In 2003 he coached Steigen and ahead of the 2007 season he took over Grand Bodø's women's team. However, two days before the start of 2007 Toppserien he resigned, needing to prioritize his civic job when the coaching job took too much of his working week.

In 2017 he was declared an honorary member of FK Lofoten. In Strømsgodset too he is regarded as a club legend.
