= Anna Johansdotter Norbäck =

Swedish religious leader (1804–1879)

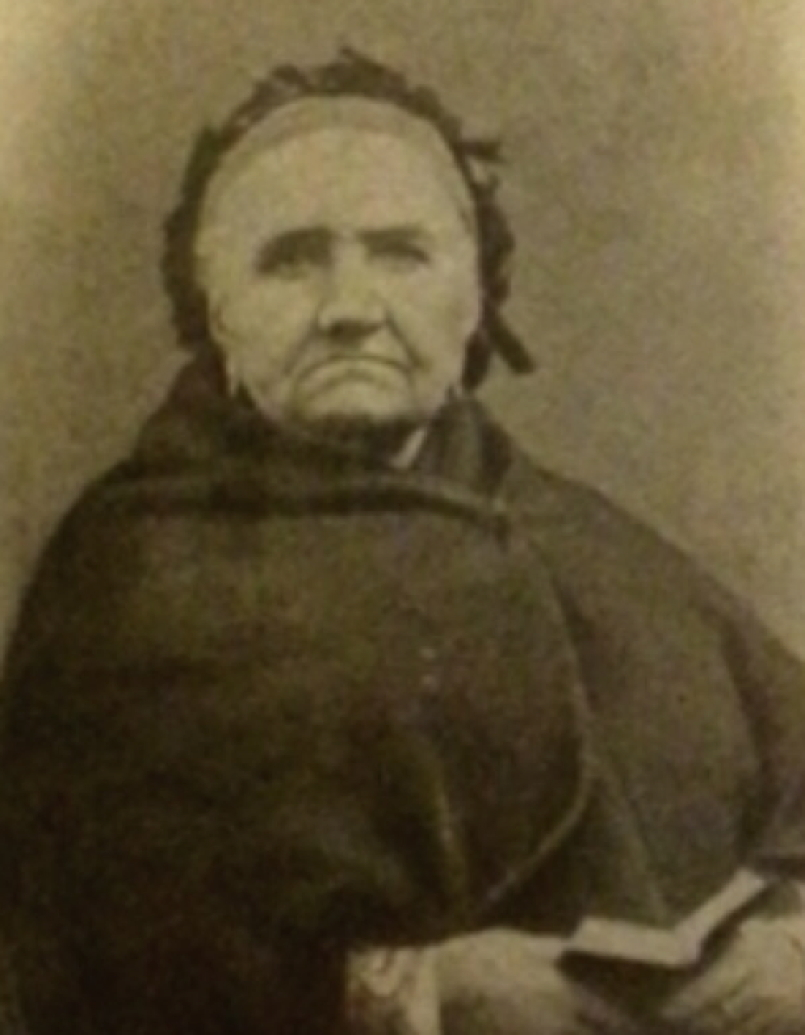
- Born: c. 25 March 1804; Själevad Parish, Ångermanland, Sweden
- Died: 3 January 1879 (aged 74); Själevad Parish

Anna Johansdotter Norbäck (25 March 1804 – 3 January 1879), also known as Mor Anna ('Mother Anna') and Annamora, was a Swedish religious leader, the founder and leader of the religious movement Annaniterna ('the Annanites'), who was named after her; however, they referred to themselves as the Evangelical Lutheran Free Church. The movement was founded in Ångermanland in the 1830s, broke off from the Swedish church in 1854 and lasted until the late 19th century.

== Life ==
Norbäck was born to boatswain Johan Norbäck in Norrvästansjö village in Själevad Parish, Ångermanland. The family was poor, and she began work as a servant girl after finishing school and being confirmed at 14 years of age. In the following years she met and learned from others active in the Läsare (Reader) and Pietist revivalist movements popular in the region, including Pehr Brandell, Maja Stina Pehrsdotter and Maja Lena Nilsdotter. She eventually became critical of the Church of Sweden as a separatist. In about 1834, she had a religious crisis and started to preach, eventually travelling far from her base in Nordanås.

She married crofter Kristoffer Kristoffersson in 1838, and settled with him in Nordanås village. Despite her being known as 'Mother Anna', the couple had no children: 'Mother Anna' was a religious title

Norbäck was described as a physically robust and dominant woman with a powerful and melodic voice. She was a successful preacher who gathered her own congregation of followers, preached sermons herself, and met opposing views with hostility. She was a strict authoritarian who micromanaged her followers' lives, and her approval was necessary if any of them wished to marry. Her congregation celebrated the Eucharist together but received the other rites from Lutheran priests. In 1854, her congregation was formally excluded from the state church and became officially autonomous, though it was illegal to hold church gatherings apart from the state church due to the Conventicle Act. Norbäck did not like children, excluded them from participating in religious practices and normally preferred them not to be seen, and showed no interest in the parish school; this is considered to have been a reason to why her movement remained a one-generation congregation, which did not last long after her death.

She was a believer in biblical infallibility and spoke in favor of literal belief in the words of the Bible, in combination with equally literal belief in the words of Luther, in particular his postil. As such, she was opposed to the 1810 revised Luther's Small Catechism, the 1811 liturgical agenda and the 1819 Swedish hymnal, and criticized the Church of Sweden for using them.

She was an inspiration to women such as Hanna Lindmark, an entrepreneur who was brought to faith through Norbäck's preaching.

Norbäck had a stroke in 1877, which partially deprived her of her ability to speak; she died in Själevad Parish in 1879.

== See also ==
- Karin Olofsdotter
- Kloka Anna
- Hanna Lindmark, entrepreneur who followed Norbäck's teachings
