= Ölsboda =

- Village
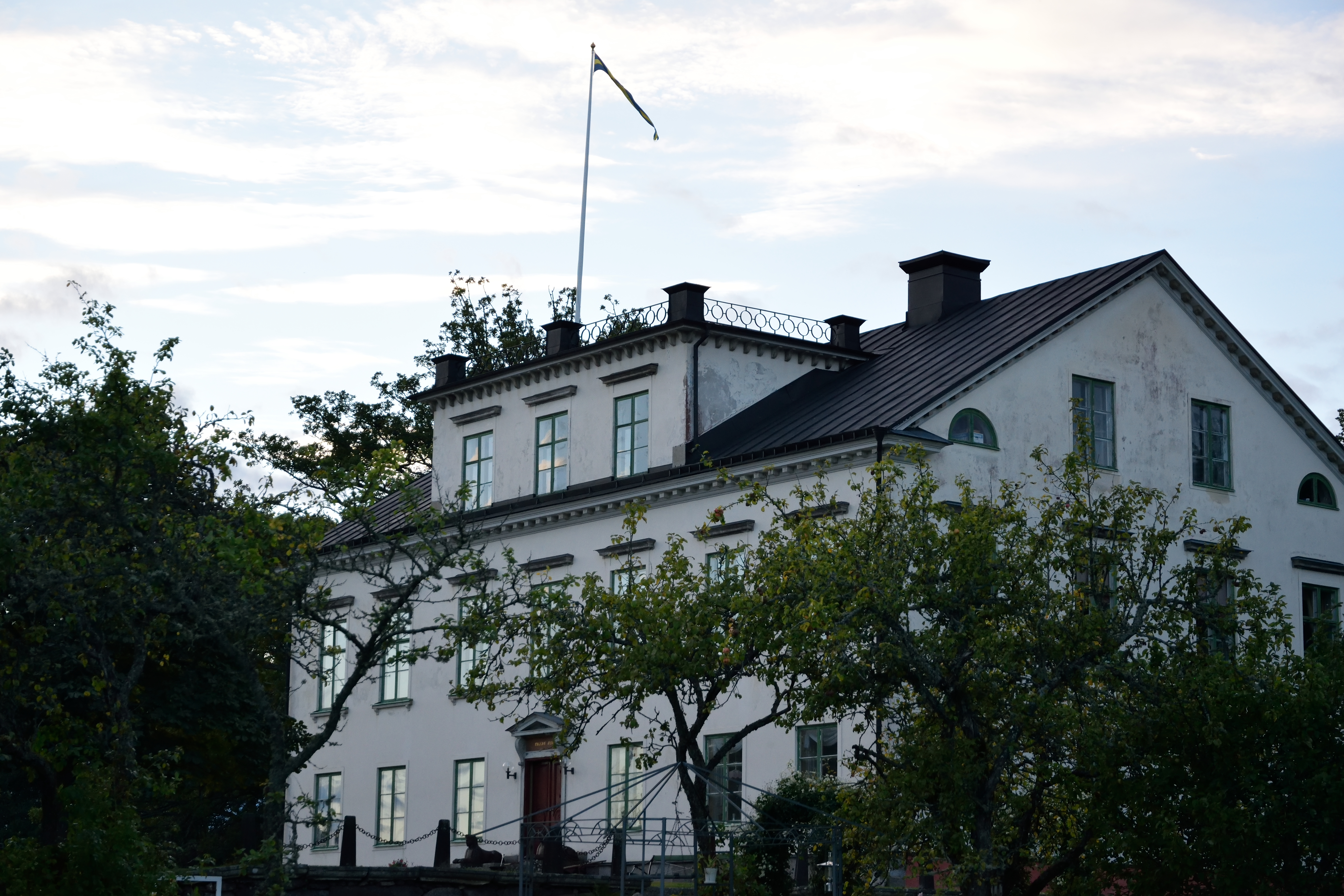
- Ölsboda Manor in 2015

- Location in Sweden
- Coordinates: 59°10′55″N 14°28′52″E
- Country: Sweden
- Province: Närke
- County: Örebro County
- Municipality: Degerfors Municipality

Population (2010)
  - Total: 50
- Time zone: UTC+1 (CET)
  - Summer (DST): UTC+2 (CEST)

Ölsboda is a village situated in Degerfors Municipality, Örebro County, Sweden, with 50 inhabitants in 2010.

== See also ==
- Ölsboda Manor
