= DISC assessment =

Leadership assessment tool

A DISC assessment is a pseudoscientific personality testing tool based on psychologist William Moulton Marston's DISC emotional and behavioural theory, first published in 1928. These assessments claim to improve job performance by categorizing individuals into four personality traits: dominance, inducement, submission, and compliance.

The scientific validity of the DISC assessment has not been demonstrated, and psychologists question its predictive validity. Despite this, the DISC assessment remains widely used in business, coaching and organizational development.

== History ==
The DISC personality theory was first outlined in the book Emotions of Normal People, published in 1928, and written by polygraph promoter William Moulton Marston, with likely contributions by Olive Byrne and Elizabeth Holloway Marston.

Marston never developed a formal assessment tool nor patented his work. As a result, multiple organizations have since interpreted and commercialized the DISC framework in different ways, leading to a variety of DISC-based assessments with differing formats, report styles, and levels of scientific validation.

== Types ==
The first self-assessment based on Marston's DISC theory was created in 1956 by Walter Clarke, an industrial psychologist. In 1956, Clarke created the Activity Vector Analysis, a checklist of adjectives on which he asked people to indicate descriptions that were accurate about themselves. This self-assessment was intended to aid businesses in choosing qualified employees. John Geier later developed DiSC (lower case 'i' intentional).

Clarke and Peter Merenda published their findings on the new instrument in the January 1965 issue of the Journal of Clinical Psychology. However, instead of using a checklist, the "Self Description" test asks respondents to make a choice between two or more terms. "Self Description" was used by Geier to create the Personal Profile System in the 1970s.

== Uses ==
The self-assessment tools are designed for use in personnel management in businesses. A DISC assessment claims to help identify workstyle preferences, determine how someone would interact with others, and provides insight on work habits. There is little to no evidence to support these claims.

Organizations often use the DISC assessment for various applications, including team building, leadership development, communication training, and conflict resolution. While it claims to provide valuable insights into individual and team dynamics, it is essential to interpret the results with caution and avoid oversimplifying complex human behaviour.

DISC has been used to help determine a course of action when dealing with problems as a leadership team by taking the various aspects of each DISC type into account when solving problems or assigning jobs.

=== Psychometric properties ===
The DISC assessments have demonstrated no ability to predict job performance, as this is not part of their designed functionality. The assessment has high reliability, meaning that an individual will consistently get the same result over time.

==== Reliability ====
A Russian pilot study found a coefficient of .89 for retesting after one week.

A research paper in the Scandinavian Journal of Psychology found acceptable levels of internal consistency in a normative DISC assessment, but also indications that the DISCUS-dimensions were not psychometrically independent, and that the DISC data structure could better be explained as combinations of the Big-Five personality traits than as independent traits.

==== Validity ====
Psychologist Wendell Williams has criticized the use of DISC in the employee recruitment process. In his criticism, Williams argues that a good job performance test should be well constructed, have test-retest reliability, have criterion validity for criteria of job performance, and incorporate the theory of job performance in the test's design.

A 2013 German study studied the validity and reliability of a DISC assessment, Persolog, to see if it was up to standards for the TBS-DTk the test assessment system of the Diagnostics and Test Board of the Federation of German Psychological Associations. The study found that it "largely" met the requirements in terms of reliability but not at all in terms of validity.

== Theory ==
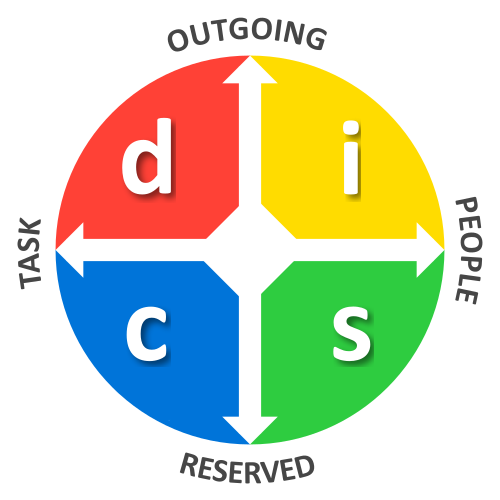
DISC wheel

The DISC theory describes personality through four central traits:

- Dominance: active use of force to overcome resistance in the environment
- Inducement: use of charm in order to deal with obstacles
- Submission: warm and voluntary acceptance of the need to fulfill a request
- Compliance: fearful adjustment to a superior force.

Marston described the DISC characteristics in his 1928 book Emotions of Normal People, which he generated from emotions and behaviour of people in the general population. According to Marston, people illustrate their emotions using four behaviour types: Dominance, inducement, submission, and compliance.

He argued that these behavioural types came from people's sense of self and their interaction with the environment. He based the four types on two underlying dimensions that influenced people's emotional behaviour. The first dimension is whether a person views their environment as favourable or unfavourable. The second dimension is whether a person perceives themselves as having control or lack of control over their environment.
