= Karin Olofsdotter =

Swedish spiritual leader

Karin Olofsdotter Bång, also known as Bång-Karin (1720–1790), was a Swedish spiritual ecstatic leader. She was the leader of an apocalyptic cult together with Mårten Thunberg, vicar of the Lillhärdal parish in Jämtland, a cult known as the Lillhärdalsläsarna ('The Lillhärdal Readers') or the Svärmeriet i Lillhärdal ('The Lillhärdal Religious ecstasy'), which lasted in Jämtland from 1768 until at least 1793.

Karin Olofsdotter was married to the farmer Johan Olofsson (1724–1794) at the farm Bångas in Nordanhån. In 1768, Karin started to appear with fits of ecstatic convulsions and glossolalia, during which she held sermons against vices and warned of a coming apocalypse. She stated that the fits came from God, and therefore could not be prevented. Karin was described as a seductive seer. The parish vicar, Mårten Thunberg, initially condemned it but after she convinced him that the fits came from the Holy Ghost, he encouraged his congregation to witness and listen to her fits and sermons, and mentioned them in his own sermon. With the support of Thunberg, Karin gathered her own congregation of followers who studied the Bible and engaged themselves in their own ecstatic fits and visions together. The movement was especially popular among women and teenage men. The movement spread in the adjoining parishes and became very popular.

The movement broke the Conventicle Act against religious services outside of the state church. In 1771, Thunberg was trialed, fined, deposed from his post as a priest and eventually placed in the Danviken Hospital. The followers of Karin were persecuted until 1793.

Karin Olofsdotter should not be confused with Karin Pehrsdotter, who was also called Bång-Karin and also active as a religious leader in the 1770s, being active in Stockholm.

== See also ==
- Gråkoltarna – mystical-apocalyptic sect from Stockholm
- Läsare – related Swedish Pietist movement
- Anna Johansdotter Norbäck
