= Degerfors Municipality =

Degerfors Municipality Degerfors kommun
- Municipality
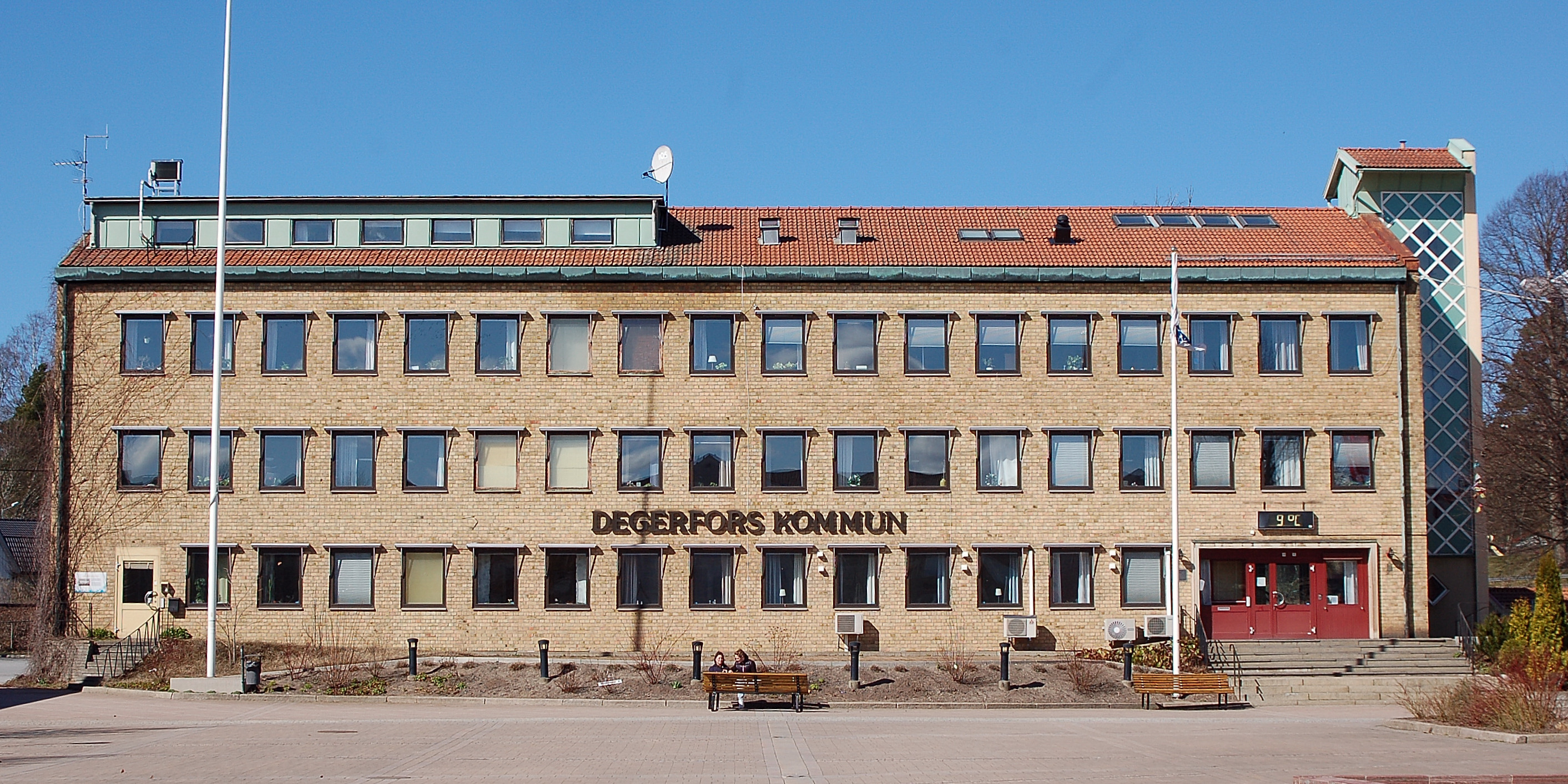
- Degerfors Municipality Office

- Coat of arms

- Coordinates: 59°14′N 14°26′E
- Country: Sweden
- County: Örebro County
- Seat: Degerfors

Area
  - Total: 433.68 km^{2} (167.44 sq mi)
  - Land: 383.98 km^{2} (148.26 sq mi)
  - Water: 49.7 km^{2} (19.2 sq mi)
- Area as of 1 January 2014.

Population (30 June 2025)
  - Total: 9,295
  - Density: 24.21/km^{2} (62.70/sq mi)
- Time zone: UTC+1 (CET)
  - Summer (DST): UTC+2 (CEST)
- ISO 3166 code: SE
- Province: Värmland and Närke
- Municipal code: 1862
- Website: www.degerfors.se

Degerfors Municipality (Swedish: Degerfors kommun) is a municipality in Örebro County in central Sweden. Its seat is located in the town of Degerfors.

The northern part of the municipality was before 1925 part of Karlskoga Municipality, from which it was detached to form a new entity. It became a market town (köping) in 1943. In 1967 it was amalgamated with a part of the dissolved Svartå Municipality.

== Demographics ==
This is a demographic table based on Degerfors Municipality's electoral districts in the 2022 Swedish general election sourced from SVT's election platform, in turn taken from SCB official statistics.

In total there were 7,456 Swedish citizens of voting age resident in the municipality. 53.6% voted for the left coalition and 45.0% for the right coalition. Indicators are in percentage points except population totals and income.

Location	Residents	Citizen adults	Left vote	Right vote	Employed	Swedish parents	Foreign heritage	Income SEK	Degree
Location			%	%					
Bossåsen	1,373	1,039	49.0	50.1	81	87	13	27,595	25
Bruket	1,480	1,148	52.9	45.9	74	80	20	22,993	24
Jannelund	1,727	1,330	63.7	35.3	59	67	33	17,262	21
Stora Valla	1,574	1,215	59.4	39.3	68	75	25	20,864	20
Strömtorp	1,821	1,488	47.9	50.7	83	86	14	26,813	26
Svartå	605	478	53.3	44.0	74	83	17	22,995	24
Åtorp	939	758	47.8	51.0	84	91	9	25,582	27
Source: SVT

== Riksdag elections ==
Year	%	Votes	V	S	MP	C	L	KD	M	SD	NyD	Left	Right
1973	94.7	7,533	4.9	63.1		18.7	5.3	2.3	5.2			68.0	29.2
1976	95.0	8,034	4.7	61.9		19.3	5.9	2.1	5.9			66.7	31.0
1979	94.1	8,194	5.7	62.8		14.3	6.6	2.0	8.1			68.5	29.1
1982	94.5	8,292	6.5	65.4	1.0	11.5	3.6	2.0	9.9			72.0	25.0
1985	93.4	8,225	7.4	64.2	1.2	10.1	8.0		9.0			71.6	27.1
1988	90.1	7,767	8.8	63.7	3.4	8.2	6.8	2.5	6.3			75.8	21.3
1991	89.7	7,691	7.4	59.7	2.1	6.4	5.4	4.9	8.6		5.3	67.1	25.3
1994	89.3	7,608	9.9	63.8	3.2	5.9	4.4	2.8	8.8		1.0	76.8	21.8
1998	83.4	6,847	17.7	54.8	3.4	4.5	2.3	7.5	8.7			75.9	23.0
2002	82.3	6,491	13.3	60.8	2.5	5.3	6.0	5.2	5.1	0.9		76.7	21.7
2006	82.3	6,302	11.2	57.6	2.7	5.4	3.2	5.2	9.8	2.9		71.5	23.6
2010	86.1	6,494	10.8	52.7	4.9	4.1	3.1	4.5	13.8	5.4		68.4	25.6
2014	86.4	6,426	8.1	51.2	4.0	4.2	1.9	3.4	10.6	14.4		63.3	20.1
2018	87.1	6,415	10.2	44.1	2.4	5.4	2.4	4.0	10.7	19.9		62.0	36.9
2022	84.9	6,261	7.7	39.6	2.4	3.9	2.3	4.2	12.0	26.6		53.6	45.0

== Twin towns ==
Degerfors two twin towns with the year of its establishing:

1. (1985) Oedheim, Germany
2. (1990) Ventspils district, Latvia

== See also ==
- Vindeln Municipality, Västerbotten County, which up until 1969 had the same name.
