= Valåsen och Labbsand =

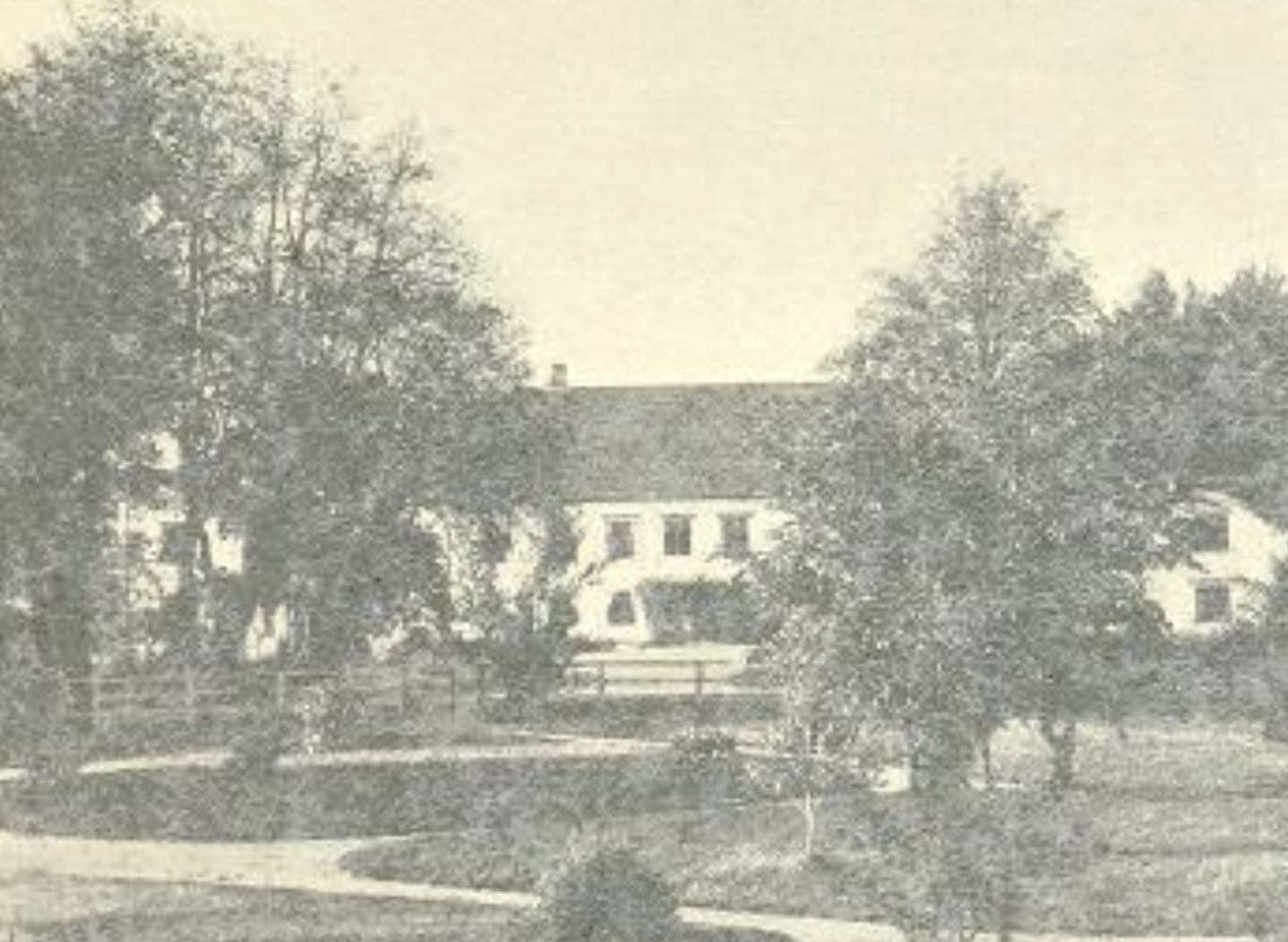
- Valåsen Manor in the 1890s

- Location within Örebro Location within Sweden
- Coordinates: 59°18′N 14°34′E
- Country: Sweden
- Province: Värmland
- County: Örebro County
- Municipality: Karlskoga Municipality

Population (2020)
  - Total: 354
- Time zone: UTC+1 (CET)
  - Summer (DST): UTC+2 (CEST)

Valåsen och Labbsand (lit. 'Valåsen and Labbsand') is a locality (tätort) situated in Karlskoga Municipality, Örebro County, Sweden with 354 inhabitants in 2020.

Established in 2015, but had previously been part of Karlskoga, according to Statistics Sweden.

== Geography ==
Historical population
Year	Pop.	±%
2015	321	—
2016	323	+0.6%
2017	337	+4.3%
2018	353	+4.7%
2020	354	+0.3%

Valåsen och Labbsand is near the course of the River Valån. The area is completely located in the Karlskoga Municipality.

The locality lies mostly to the south of Valåsen Manor, and is bounded notionally by Kilsbergen (the low mountainous ridge) to the east, Lake Möckeln to the west, Degerfors Municipality to the south. To the north is a subdivision of Moelven Industrier, Moelven Valåsen AB.

The area is mostly residential, the particular exception being Karlskoga Golf Club.

Bus services run to both Central Karlskoga and Degerfors.

== History ==
In 1632, Valåsen was established as an ironworks, the very first works in the Karlskoga Socken. The ironworks was disestablished in 1918.

== Notable people ==
- Erland von Hofsten, ironmaster
- Nils von Hofsten, politician
- Johanna Christina von Hofsten, Swedish-language children's writer
- Stina Swartling, writer
