= Rövarbro Skans =

Hillfort in Sweden

Coordinates: 59°16′51″N 14°44′07″E

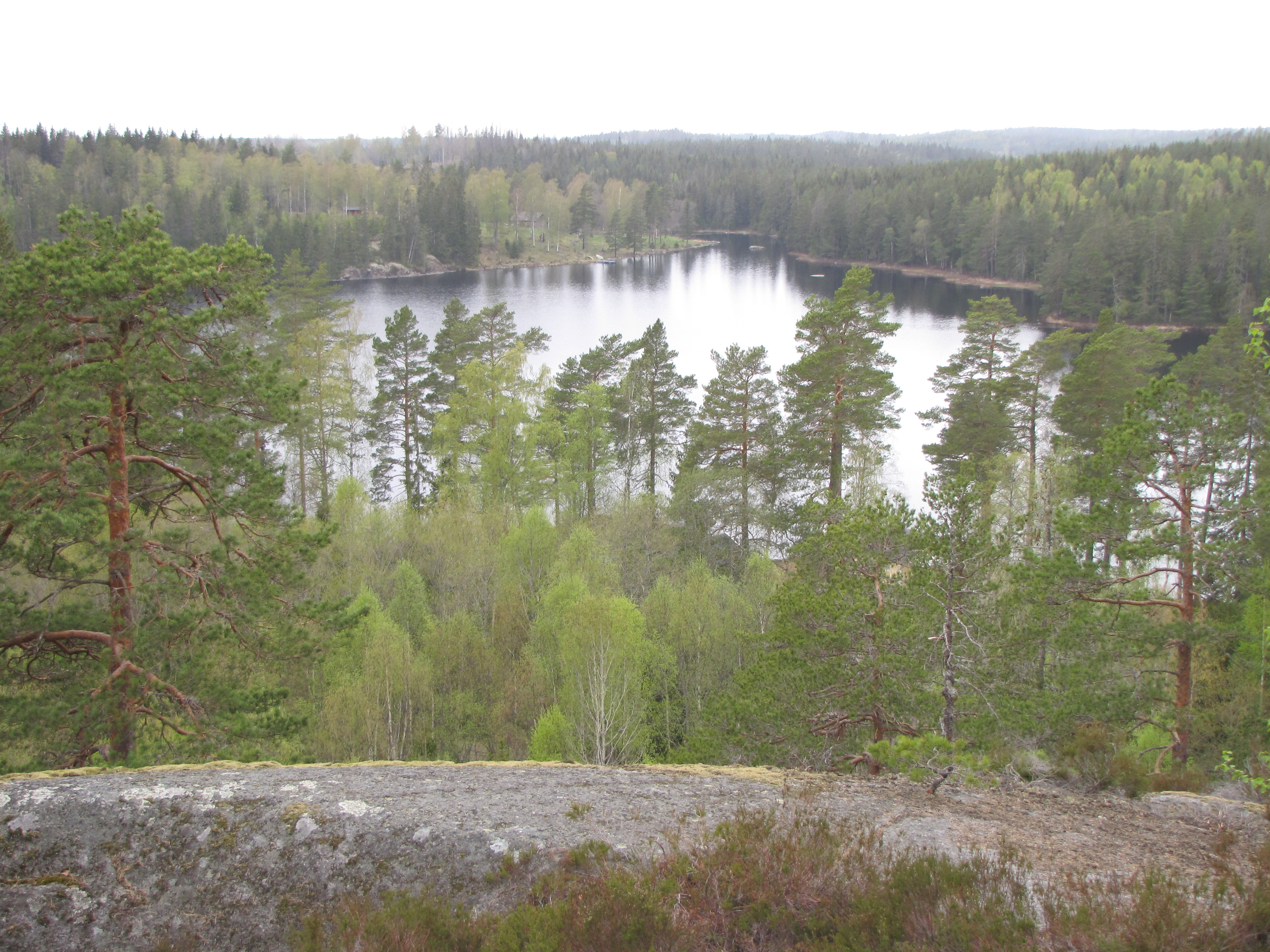
View from Rövarbro Skans

Rövarbro Skans, also Rövarberget, is a prehistoric hillfort in Närke, Sweden.

== Geography ==
Rövarbro Skans is situated in Kilsbergen, east of the village of Villingsberg in Karlskoga Municipality, near Lekeberg Municipality. The hill rises to approximately 190 meters above sea level and is surrounded by steep rock faces on several sides. The area overlooks Lake Lilla Noren, with views over the surrounding forest and lake landscape.

The hillforts sits at a nature reserve, the Rövarbro Skans nature reserve, originally established in 1943.

== History ==
The hillfort at Rövarbro Skans dates back to the Migration Period of the Iron Age, approximately 400–500 CE. It belongs to a series of hillforts built along the Kilsbergen Mountain Ridge, likely serving as refuges during times of conflict.

The name “Rövarbro,” meaning “Robbers’ Bridge,” is connected with local legends of robbers or bandits using the fortress as a hideout before the region became more settled. One legend tells of a shepherd girl who was abducted, only to leave traces that led rescuers to capture the robbers.
