= Erland von Hofsten =

Erland von Hofsten may refer to:

- Erland von Hofsten (ironmaster, born 1719) (1719–1758)
- Erland von Hofsten (ironmaster, born 1780) (1780–1839)
