= Erland von Hofsten (ironmaster, born 1719) =

Swedish ironmaster and chamberlain (1719–1758)

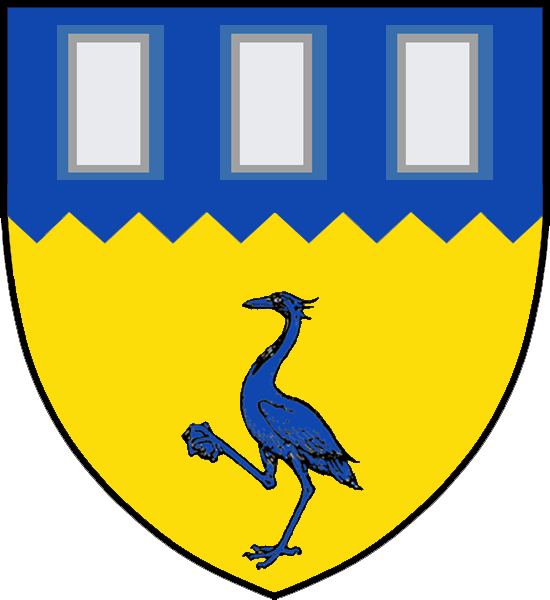
- Coat of arms
- Born: 7 August 1719
- Died: 8 June 1758 (aged 38); Villingsberg, Knista Socken (present-day Karlskoga Municipality), Sweden
- Buried: Knista Cemetery
- Spouse: Christina Kolthoff (m. 1743)
- Issue: Bengt
- Occupation: Ironmaster; Chamberlain

Erland von Hofsten (Swedish pronunciation: [fɔn hɔfˈstɛːn]; 7 August 1719 – 8 June 1758), was a Swedish ironmaster, chamberlain, and heir to the Villingsberg Works.

== Life and work ==
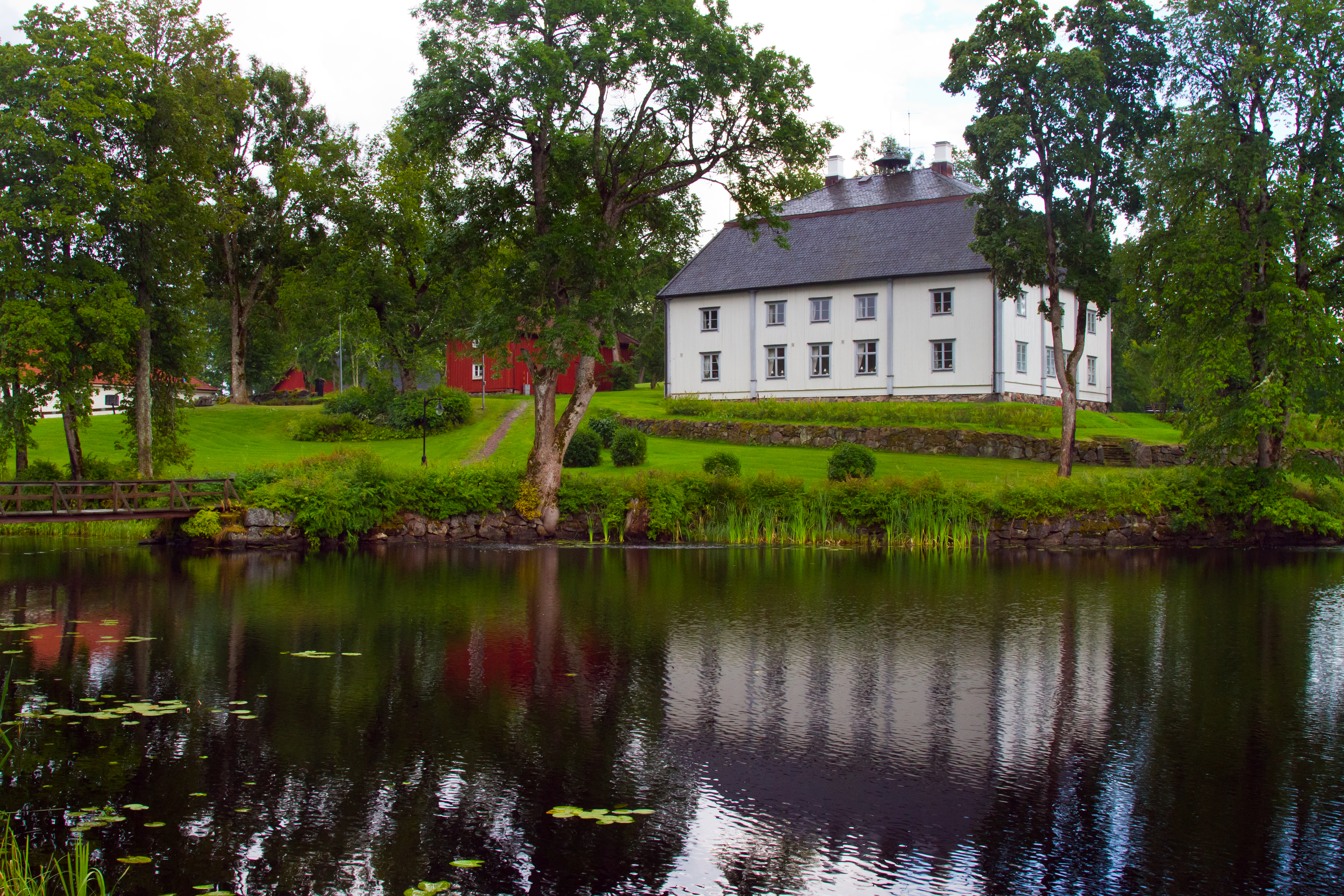
Villingsberg Manor on the property of the Villingsberg Works.

Erland von Hofsten was born on August 7, 1719, and was the first of nine children of Bengt Erlandsson Hofsten and Ingrid Brita Kolthoff.

In 1733, he enrolled at Uppsala University. In 1740, he began serving as a hovjunkare, and in 1742 as a chamberlain.

Von Hofsten was ironmaster to both Villingsberg and Valåsen Works, in present-day Karlskoga Municipality. In addition, Von Hofsten is known to have been an importer of East Indian Porcelain.

In 1743, Erland von Hofsten married Christina Kolthoff. They were both buried at Knista Cemetery.
