= Stina Swartling =

Swedish writer (1858–1929)

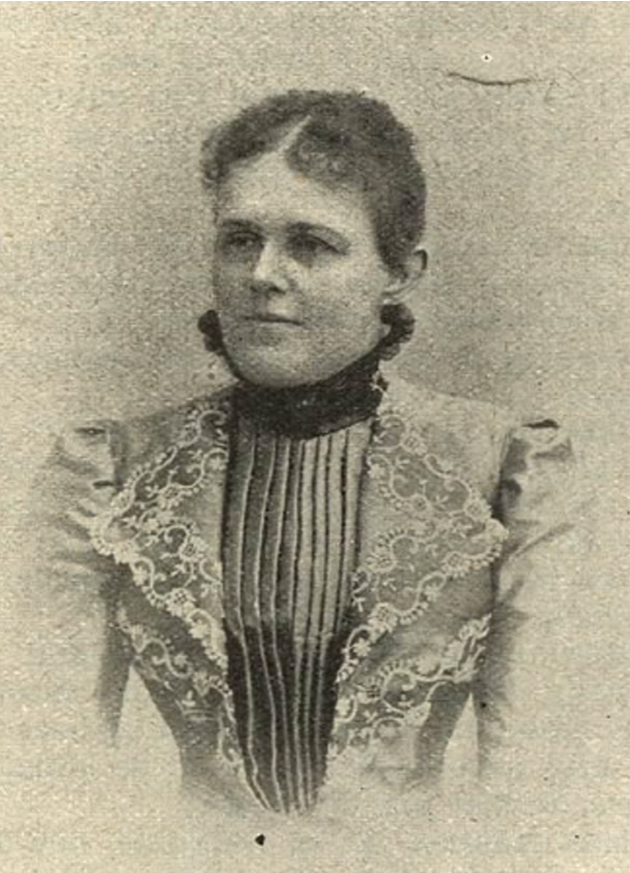
- Born: Kristina Lovisa von Hofsten; 28 June 1858; Valåsen Manor, Karlskoga, Örebro County, Sweden
- Died: 26 November 1912 (aged 54); Köping, Västmanland County, Sweden
- Occupation: Writer
- Spouse: Reinhold Magnus Swartling
- Father: Bengt von Hofsten
- Relatives: Erland (grandfather); Johanna Christina von Hofsten (aunt)

Stina Swartling (née von Hofsten; 28 June 1858 – 26 November 1929), was a Swedish writer.

== Life and work ==
Stina Swartling was born on June 28, 1858, at Valåsen Manor, Karlskoga, Sweden, and was the second of ten children of Bengt and Baroness Lovisa Sofia von Hofsten (née Hamilton af Hageby).

In 1880, Stina von Hofsten married Reinhold Magnus Svartling. The couple settled in Espenäs, Örebro County.

In 1899, Swartling founded a garden school, which she branded as Sweden's first women-only garden school.

== Bibliography ==
- Om höns, 1906.
- Om sparris och tomater, 1907.
- Om kalkoner, pärlhöns, gäss och ankor, 1908.
- Om jord och gödslingsämnen samt om potatis, 1909.
