= Karlskoga Church =

Coordinates: 59°19′33″N 14°31′19″E

- Karlskoga kyrka
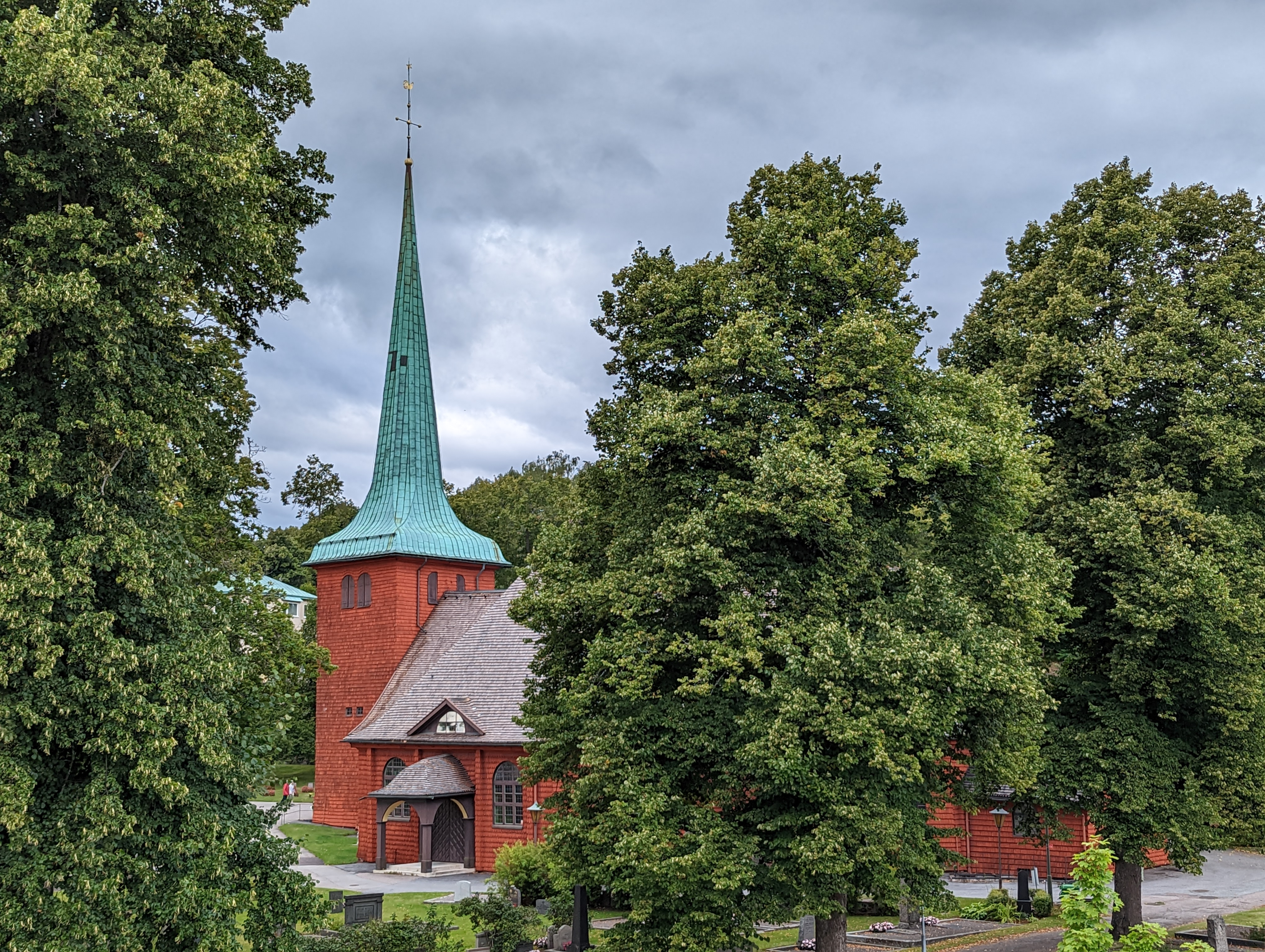
- Karlskoga Church in 2022
- Karlskoga Church
- Location: Karlskoga
- Address: Kungsvägen 38
- Country: Sweden
- Denomination: Church of Sweden

History
- Status: Parish church
- Consecrated: c. 1600

Administration
- Diocese: Diocese of Karlstad
- Parish: Karlskoga

Clergy
- Vicar: Pernilla Rosin

The Karlskoga Church (Swedish: Karlskoga kyrka [kaɭˈskûːɡa ˈɕʏ̂rːka]) is a wooden church building in Karlskoga, Sweden. Belonging to the Church of Sweden, the church was inaugurated in the 1600s. It stands as both the oldest building and church in Karlskoga, predating Villa Ekeliden in age.

== History ==
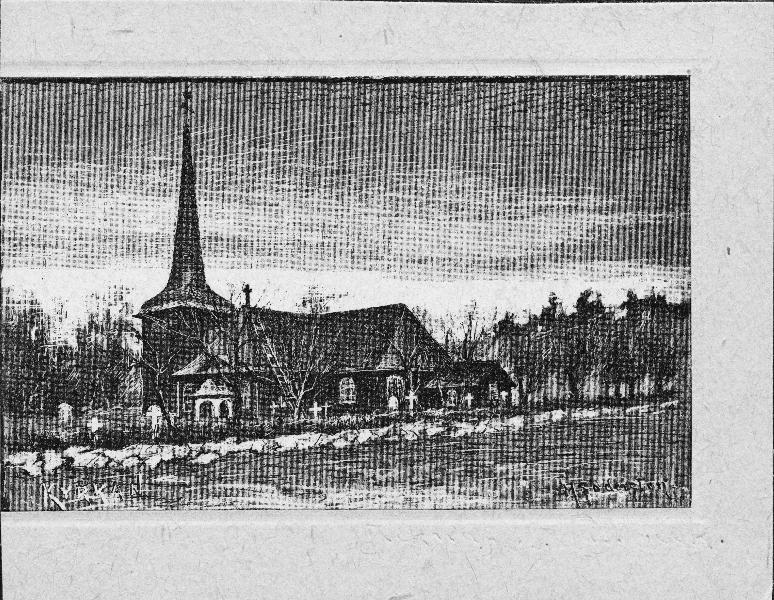
Sketch of the Karlskoga Church, sketcher Herman Södersten

On July 1, 1586, Charles IX of Sweden issued a letter for the first priest elected, Olaus Gestricius – also Olavus Johannis, Olof Hansson and «herr Olaf på Möckelnsbodar» – (by the late 1500s) where he addressed the need for a church by Lake Möckeln. The residents were ordered to erect the church and completed it at the beginning of the 1600s. It lacked pews, and the attendees had to stand upright during church service. The need for a church building is partly explained by a period of population growth in nearby areas due to a booming mining industry and Forest Finns settling the area.

From 1705 to 1706, the church was rebuilt and got its current size.

The church was renovated in 1972–1973, and in 2015–2016.

== Donations ==
The church's altarpiece was donated by Gerhard Ysing in 1686, chandeliers by both Anton af Geijerstam and Gerhard Ysing, and a pulpit by Johan Camitz in 1774.

Kristina Lovisa von Hofsten (née Geijer), also known as "Stornåda" donated a grandfather clock to the church in the 1700s.

== Present day ==
Karlskoga Church is an active parish church in the parish of Karlskoga, and the diocese of Karlstad. It arranges services on Sundays, baptisms, weddings and funerals.
