= Valåsen Manor =

18th-century manor house in Karlskoga, Sweden

Coordinates: 59°18′35″N 14°35′11″E

- Valåsens herrgård
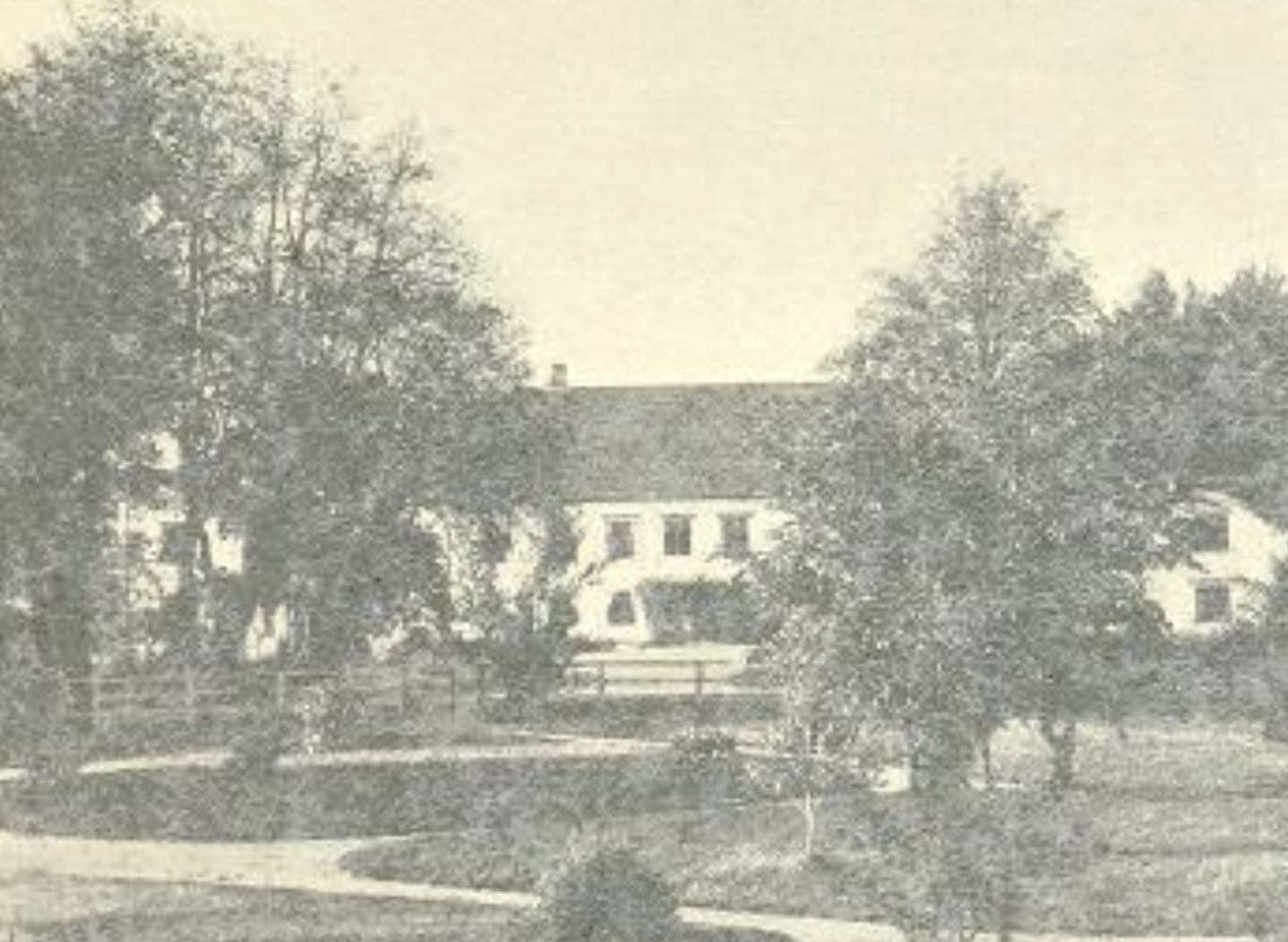
- Entrance of Valåsen Manor
- Interactive map of the Valåsen Manor area

General information
- Type: Manor house
- Location: Valåsens Herrgård 200, Valåsen och Labbsand, Karlskoga Municipality, Örebro County, Sweden
- Construction started: 18th century

Website
- Valasensherrgard.se

Valåsen Manor (Swedish: Valåsens herrgård, Swedish pronunciation: [vɑːloːseːn]) is a manor house at Valåsen och Labbsand by Valåsen Ironworks. The manor is located in Karlskoga Municipality, Örebro County, Sweden. The current-standing manor house was built in the 18th century, but the history of the property is older. Valåsen Manor is one of Karlskoga's major historical buildings.

The manor is associated with several Swedish writers including Selma Lagerlöf, Hjalmar Bergman, Erik Gustaf Geijer and Sven Stolpe.

== Geography ==
Valåsen Manor is near the course of the River Valån, east of Lake Möckeln, uphill on a sloping site. It is bounded notionally by Kilsbergen and Lake Angsjön, to the east.

== History ==
Valåsen Works was acquired in the 1630s by Gerhard Ysing from Arvid Bengtsson. Valåsen was passed to Ysing's heir, Johan Ysing.

In 1779, the manor was acquired by nobleman Bengt von Hofsten. There he created an English landscape garden. The manor was then passed to his heirs. For several generations the property was strongly associated with the Swedish noble family von Hofsten.

Bengt von Hofsten died in 1826. The manor was therefore inherited by his son Erland von Hofsten, he resided in the manor for approximately 13 years. The manor was then inherited by his son Bengt Johan von Hofsten in 1839. The last member of the von Hofsten family to reside at Valåsen Manor was painter Hugo Olof von Hofsten, who in 1885 emigrated to the United States.

Swedish reform pedagogue Anna Whitlock was employed as governess by Ironmaster von Hofsten at Valåsen Manor.

In the 1880s, the owner had gone bankrupt and was therefore forced to auction the property.

=== 20th century ===
C. J. Yngström resided in the manor at the beginning of the 20th century. It was then purchased by Ironmaster Ernst Kjellberg. He settled in the manor in 1913.

In the mid 20th century, the manor was acquired by Sven Stolpe and Karin von Euler-Chelpin. They resided at the manor, where they also gave birth to Lisette Schulman. Lisette became renown Swedish journalist Alex Schulman's mother.

Sven Stolpe enjoyed living at Valåsen Manor since he embraced the building's history.

== Cultural depictions ==
In 1925, Swedish author Selma Lagerlöf published novel Charlotte Löwensköld, in which she depicted Valåsen Manor.

== See also ==
- List of castles and palaces in Sweden
  - Björkborn Manor
  - Villingsberg Manor
