= Nobel Laboratory =

Coordinates: 59.3430°N 14.5345°E

- Nobellaboratoriet; Alfred Nobels laboratorium
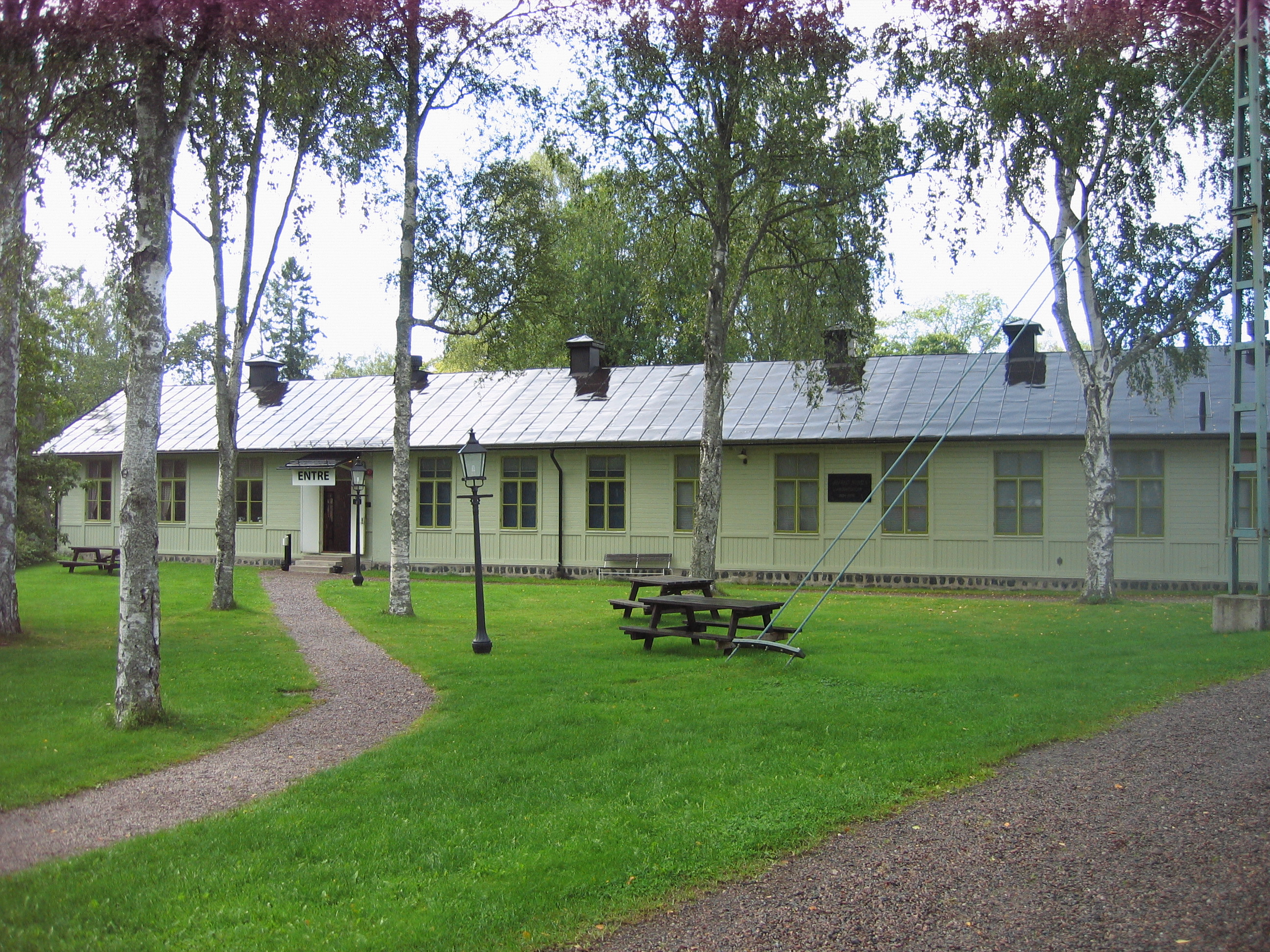
- Interactive map of the Nobel Laboratory area

General information
- Location: Karlskoga, Sweden
- Completed: 1895

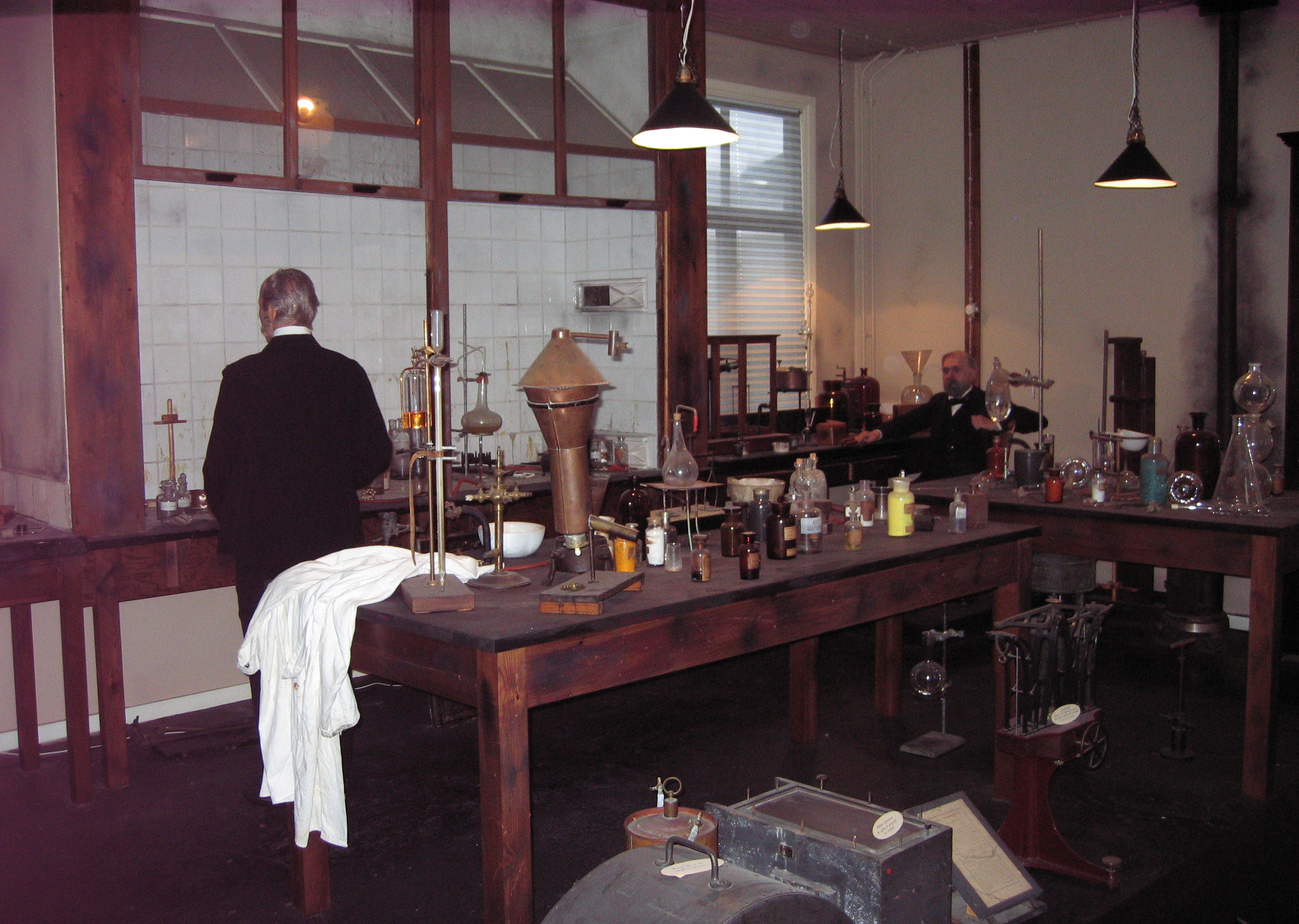
Nobel laboratory

The Nobel Laboratory (Swedish: Nobellaboratoriet) is a laboratory museum in Karlskoga, Sweden, completed in 1895. The laboratory building sits near Björkborn Manor and the pedestrian Björkborn Bridge.

Since the museum opened, the building has housed an exhibition on Alfred Nobel, his inventions, and businesses.

== See also ==
- Bofors
