= Johanna Christina von Hofsten =

Swedish-language children's writer (1832–1913)

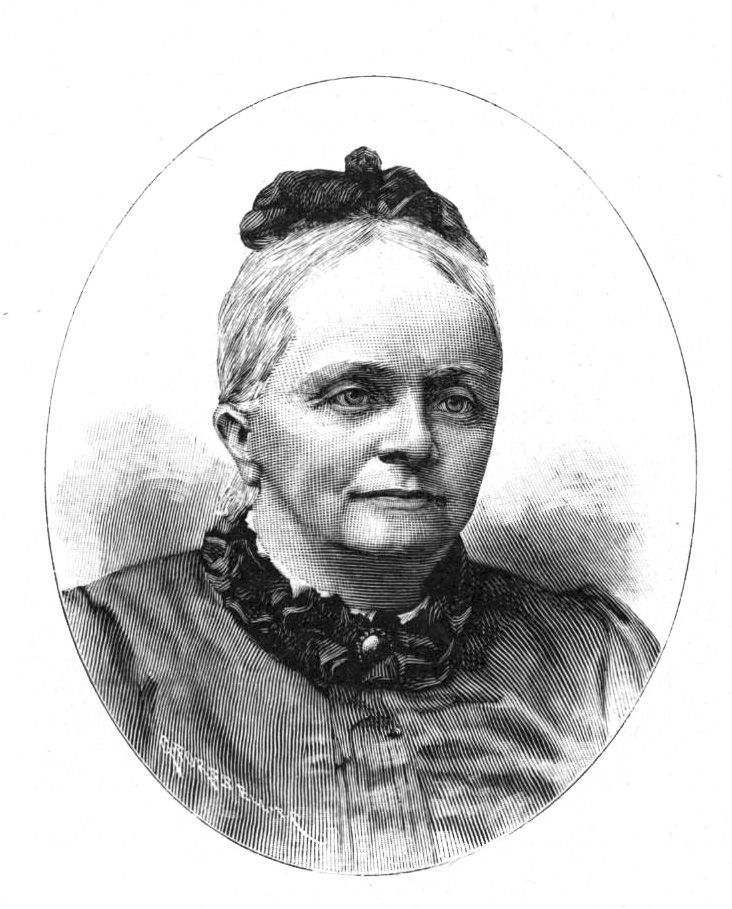
- Johanna Christina von Hofsten
- Born: Christina Johanna Augusta von Hofsten; 3 September 1832; Valåsen Manor, Karlskoga, Sweden
- Died: 19 December 1913 (aged 81); Sweden
- Father: Erland von Hofsten

Johanna Christina von Hofsten (Swedish pronunciation: [fɔn hɔfˈstɛːn]; 3 September 1832 – 19 December 1913) was a Swedish-language children's writer.

== Life and work ==
Johanna Christina von Hofsten was born into the von Hofsten family at Valåsen Manor in Karlskoga Socken (present-day Valåsen och Labbsand). She was the fourth of five children to Ironmaster Erland von Hofsten and Johanna Fredrika Nordenfelt.

Von Hofsten died on 19 December 1913 in Gerum socken.
