= Valåsen Ironworks =

- Valåsens bruk
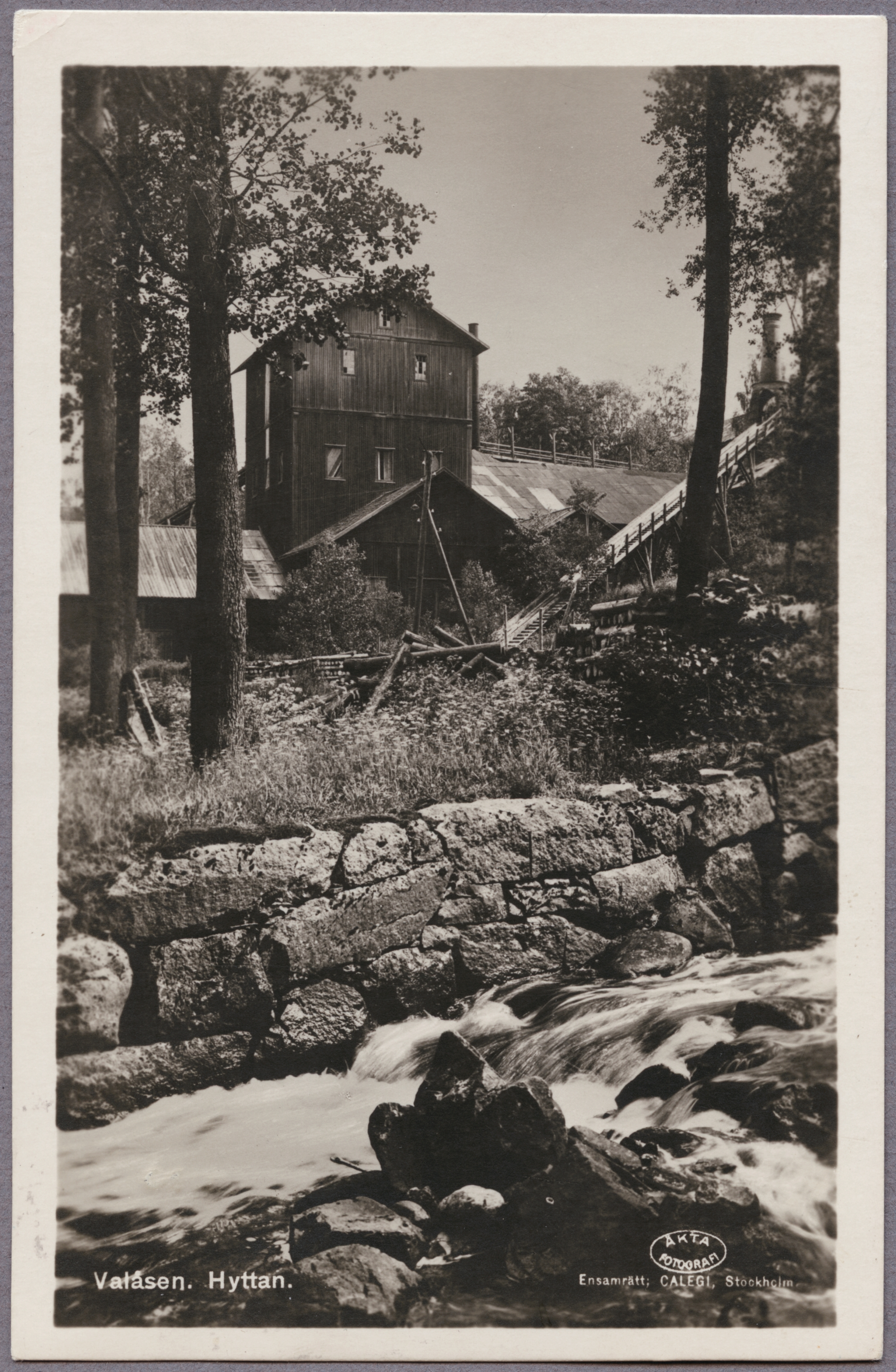
- Valåsen Ironworks
- Interactive map of the Valåsen Ironworks area
- Alternative names: Valåsens hytta

General information
- Type: Ironworks
- Location: Valåsen, Karlskoga, Sweden
- Coordinates: 59.309453°N 14.584458°E
- Opened: 1632

Valåsen Ironworks (Swedish: Valåsens bruk) is an ironworks in Valåsen, a village in Karlskoga Municipality in Sweden. Valåsen is older than the nearby Bofors.

== History ==
The estate was taken over by Sven Björnsson. In 1631, Björnsson sold the estate to the mayor Arvid Bengtsson in Örebro. Arvid established the first forge for the Karlskoga here in 1632. In the late 1630s, Arvid Bengtsson sold Valåsen to Gerhard Ysing, a merchant in Örebro. In 1648, Ysing was granted permission to build a new forge at Övre Valåsen. After Gert Ysing, his son Johan Ysing took over the operation in 1673. In 1712, Johan was granted permission to establish a waterworks. In the 17th century, Hans Lang (c. 1606–1706) served as the chief hammersmith at the Valåsen Ironworks. From 1779 onward, the ironworks belonged to the von Hofsten family.

For a period of time, Swedish reformer Anna Whitlock served as a governess there.

== See also ==
- Valåsen Manor
- Granbergsdal Ironworks
