= Timeline of Karlskoga =

History of Karlskoga, Sweden

The following is a timeline of the history of the city of Karlskoga, Sweden (originally Möckelns bodar).

== Prior to 16th century ==
- 1261 – First mention of Karlskoga as Möckelsbodar. (Note: Alternative ways of spelling this location name are "Möckelns bodar", "Möckelsboderna", "Bodarna". or Mukrisbother.)

== 16th century ==
- 1586 – Karlskoga Parish is established.
- 1589 – Parish renamed after Charles IX of Sweden.

== 19th century ==
- 1825 – The first folkskola is established.
- 1870s – Nora–Karlskoga Line opens
- 1883 – The Swedish newspaper Karlskoga Tidning is established as a weekly periodical.
- 1885 – Street lighting begins.
- 1894 – Alfred Nobel acquired Karlskoga-based corporation Bofors-Gullspång.
- 1897 – Karlskoga Municipal Community is established.

== 20th century ==
- 1900 – Population surpassed 10,000 inhabitants.
- 1904 – The Karlskoga epidemical hospital is established.
- 1925 – Degerfors detached itself from the Karlskoga Municipal Community.
- 1940 – Karlskoga Parish is established as a new administrative entity, "Karlskoga stad".
- 1944 – BIK Karlskoga is established.
- 1946 – Opening of Karlskoga Art Gallery.
- 1951 – The local district court opens.
- 1963 – KB Karlskoga FF establishes.
- 1970 – Severe disaster at Gälleråsen.
- 1972 – Karlskoga folk high school establishes.
- 1974 – K-center Galleria establishes.
- 1979 – Hosted the 1979 World Junior Ice Hockey Championships.
- 1985 – On 10 January 1985, a gas leak occurs at Björkborn.
- 1994 – Sweden becomes part of the European Union.
- 1996 – City twinned with Narva in Estonia.

== 21st century ==
- 2009 – Karlskoga District Court closes and merges with Örebro District Court.
- 2015 – Karlskoga Municipality celebrates surpassing 30,000 inhabitants.
- 2022 – The new Björkborn Bridge replaces the old, poorly maintained bridge.

== See also ==
- Timeline of Swedish history
