= Villingsberg Training Area =

Military training field outside Villingsberg in Sweden

Coordinates: 59°17′22″N 14°42′15″E

Villingsberg Training Area
- Villingsbergs skjutfält
- Villingsberg, Sweden

Site information
- Type: Training area
- Owner: Swedish Fortifications Agency
- Operator: Swedish Armed Forces
- Controlled by: Bergslagen Artillery Regiment

Location
- Area: 100 square kilometres (39 mi^{2})

Site history
- Built: 1943
- In use: 1943–present

Villingsberg Training Area (Swedish: Villingsbergs skjutfält) is a military training area outside Villingsberg in Sweden. It is owned by the Swedish Fortifications Agency but is managed by the Bergslagen Artillery Regiment.

== History ==
The training area was established in 1943 through the purchase of Villingsberg Manor and incorporation of multiple smaller forestry operations, which came to encompass about 100 square kilometres (39 mi^{2}).

The 2019 IPSC Rifle World Shoot was hosted at the range from 3 to 10 August.

On 1 January 2025, following the reestablishment of Kristinehamn Garrison, the responsibility for the training area was transferred to the Bergslagen Artillery Regiment.

== Gallery ==
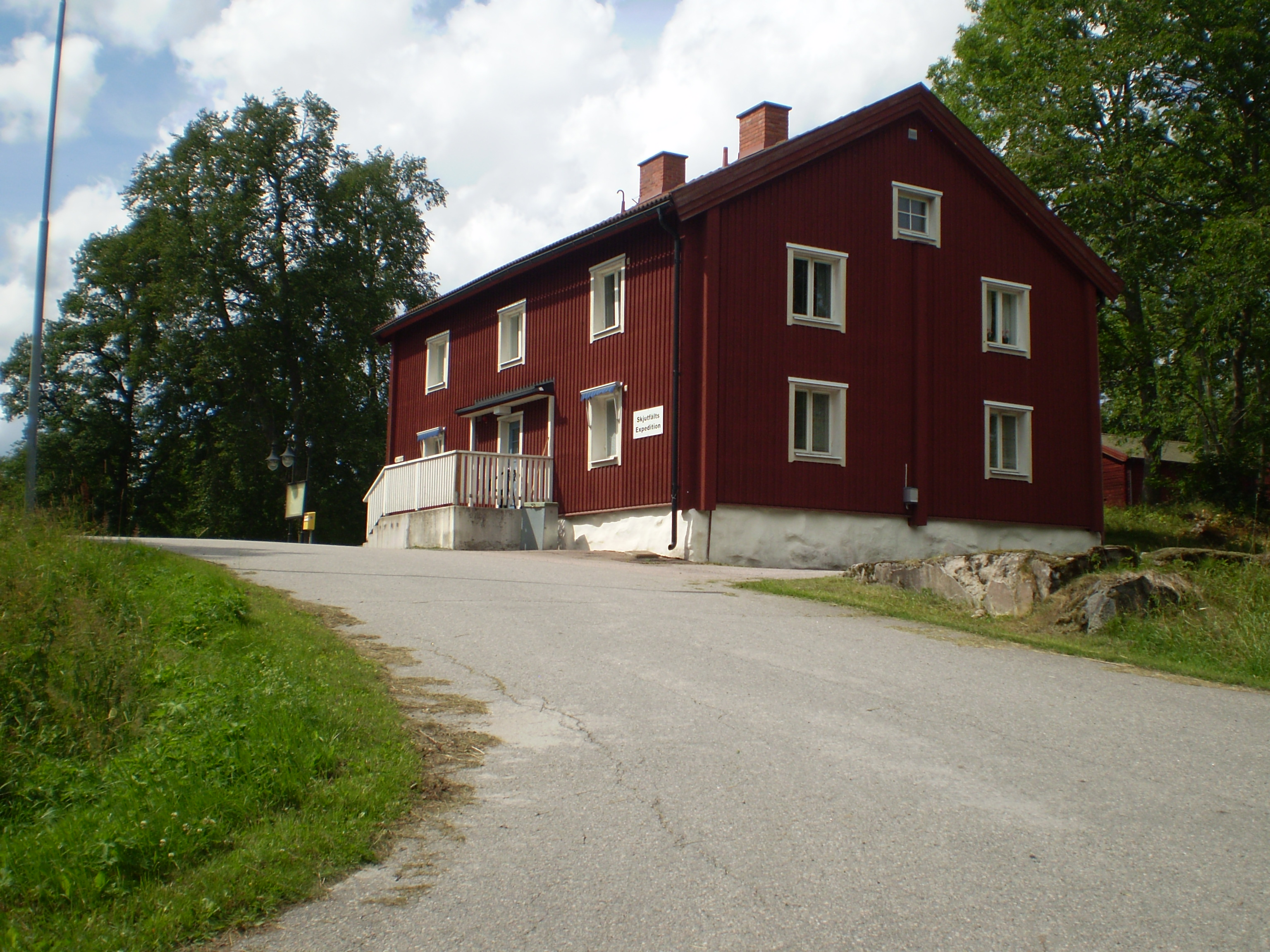
Shooting range expedition

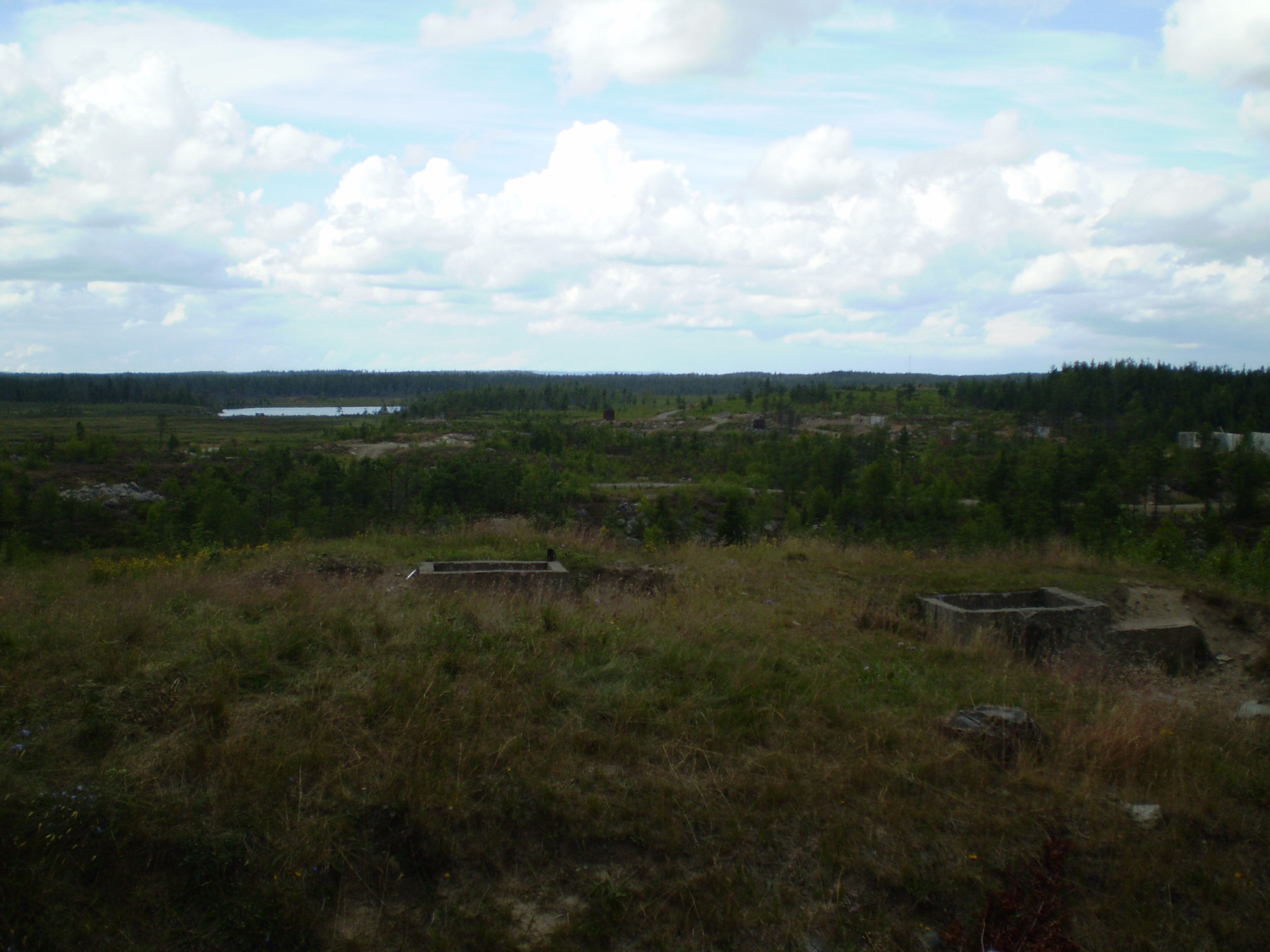
View from the shooting area at Generalshöjden

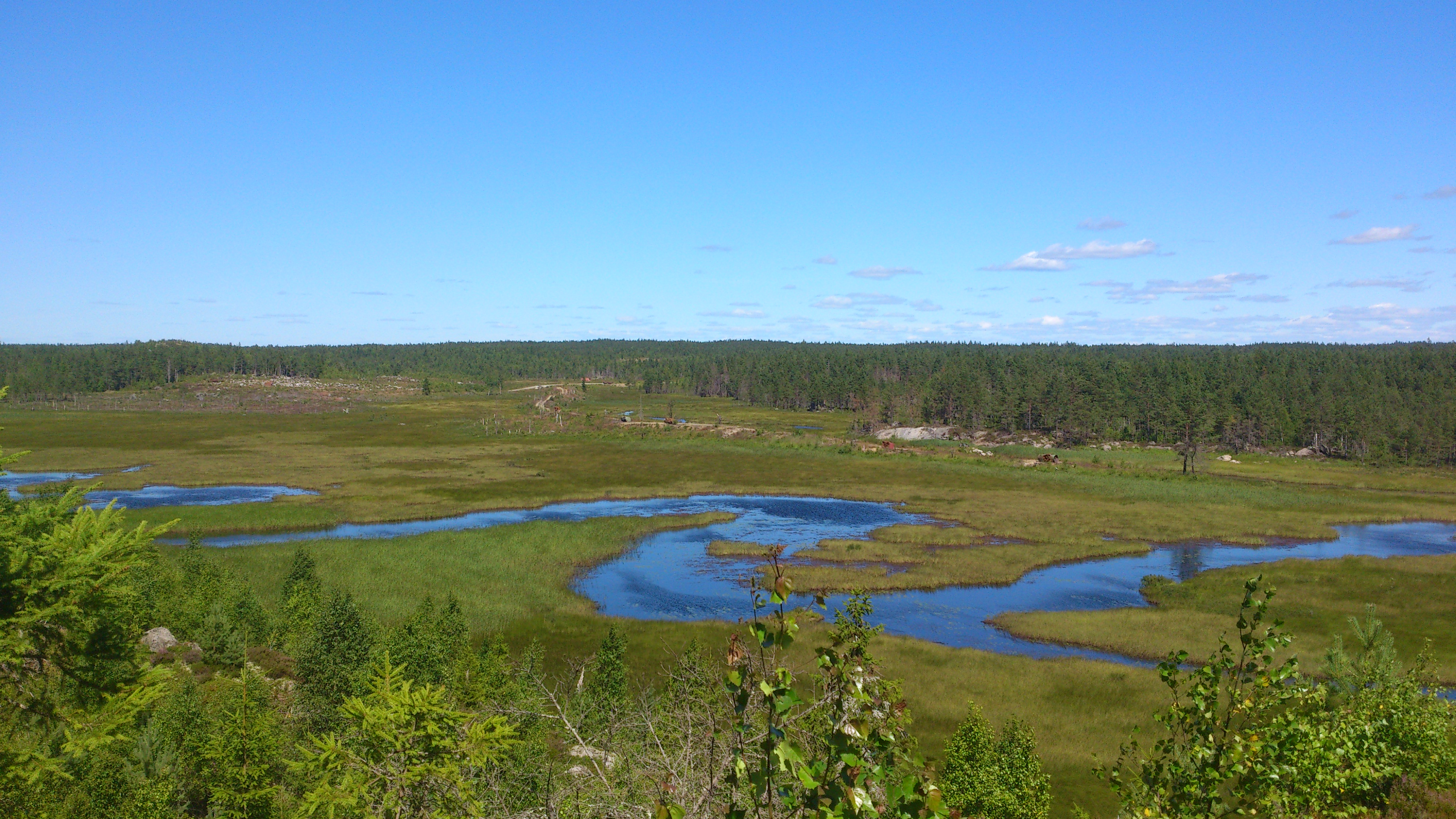
View from the shooting area at Kärmen

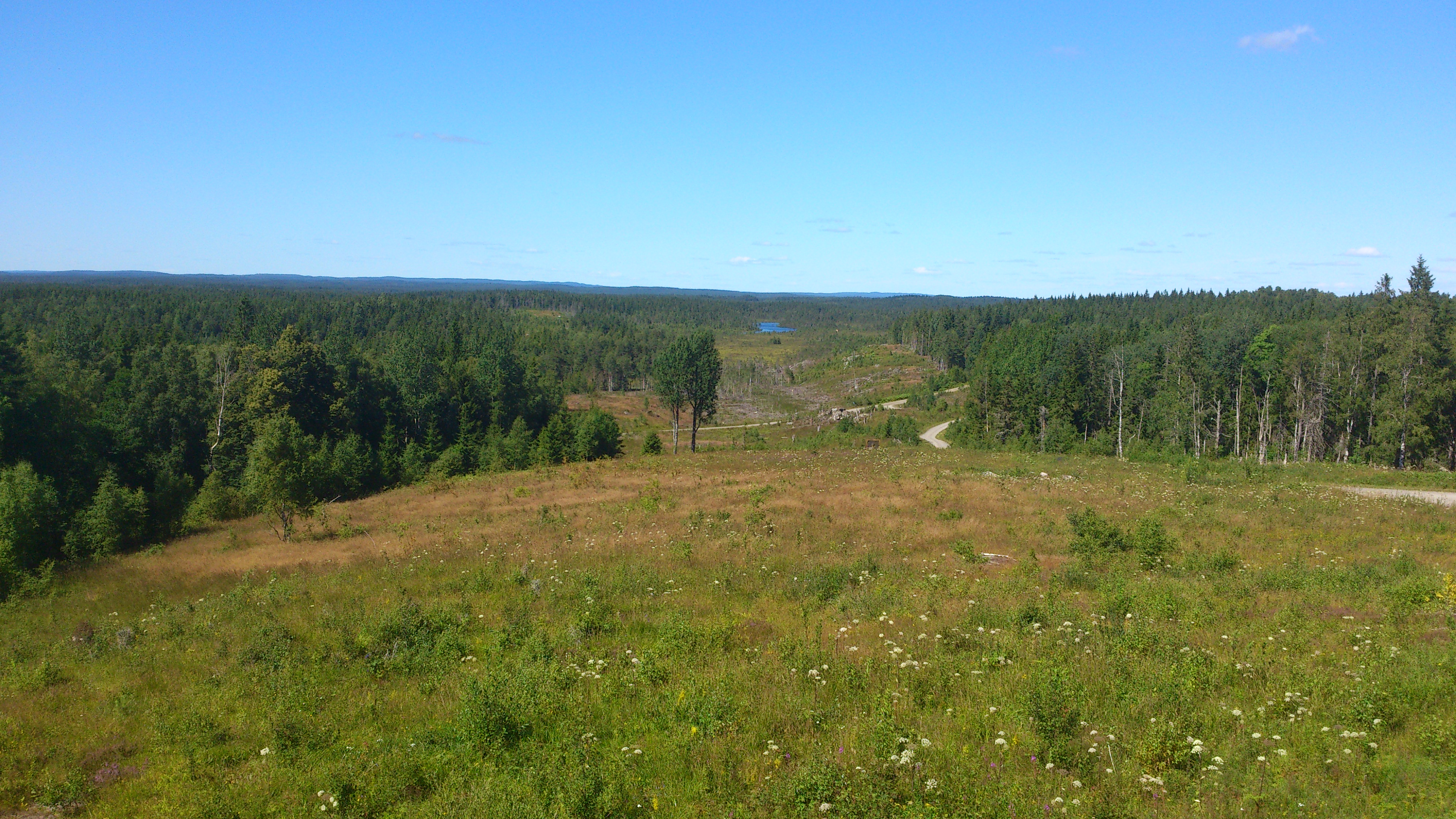
View from the shooting area at Berga

== Sources ==
- Försvarsmakten (17 January 2026). "Samrådsunderlag – avgränsningssamråd Villingsbergs skjutfält" (PDF). forsvarsmakten.se (in Swedish). Swedish Armed Forces.
- IPSC (1 October 2018). "Swedish Armed Forces give green light to the IPSC Rifle World Shoot". facebook.com.
- Bergslagen Artillery Regiment (31 January 2025). "ÖVERTAGANDE SKJUTFÄLT" (in Swedish).
