= Karlsdal Chapel =

- Karlsdals kapell
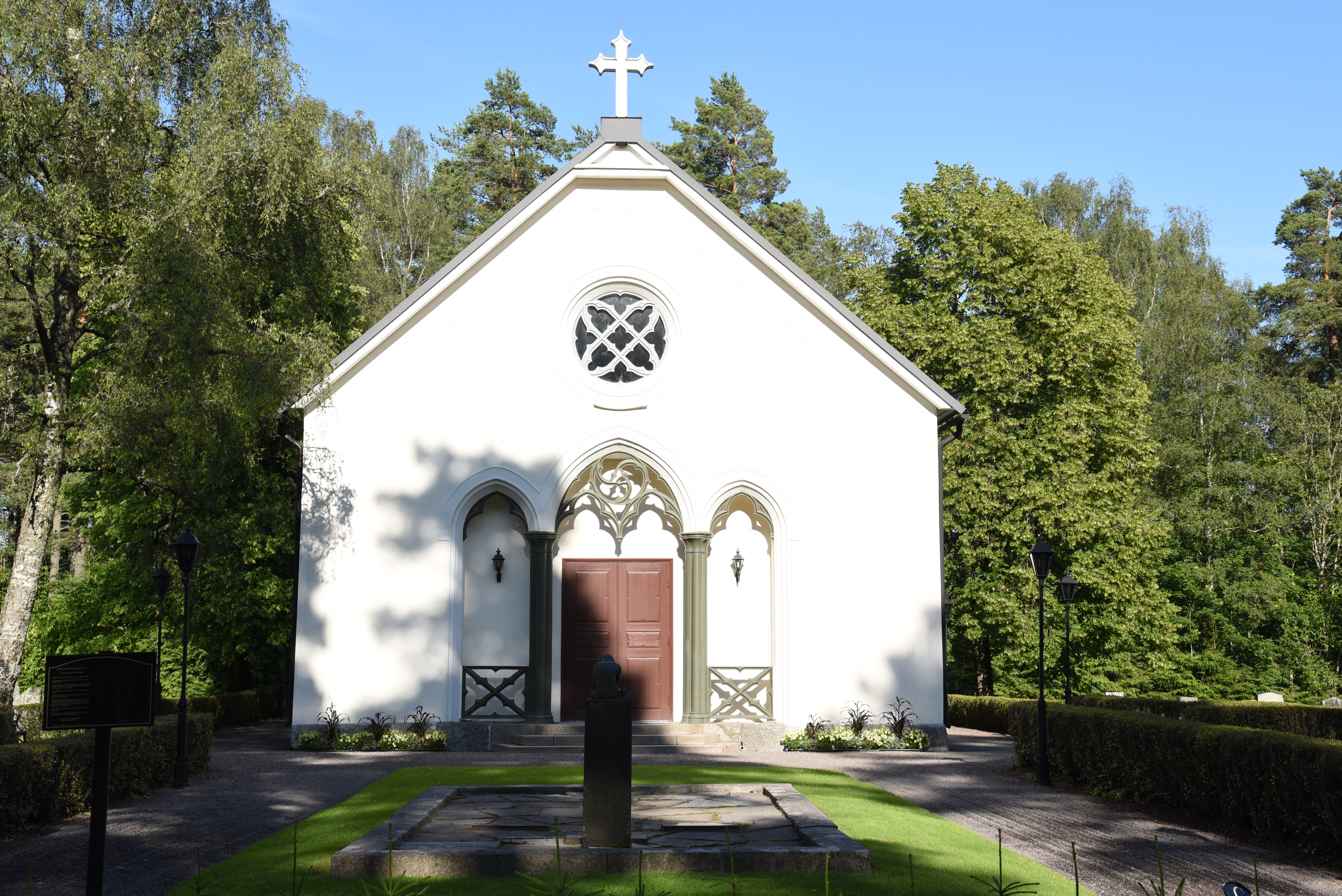
- Karlsdal Chapel in 2015
- Karlsdal Chapel
- Location: Karlskoga Municipality
- Country: Sweden
- Denomination: Church of Sweden

Architecture
- Architect: Fredrik Wilhelm Scholander
- Architectural type: Gothic Revival
- Completed: 1842

Administration
- Diocese: Diocese of Karlstad

The Karlsdal Chapel (Swedish: Karlsdals kapell) is a chapel in Karlskoga Municipality in Sweden, located in Karlsdal, 15 km (9 mi) north of Karlskoga.

In 1736, Karl Luthman, an ironmaster, applied for permission to build a chapel at Karlsdal because the distance to Karlskoga Church was too far. The chapel building was completed in 1842, and served as the church to the Karlsdal Church Parish until 1922 when it merged with the Karlskoga Church Parish.
