= Villa Ekeliden =

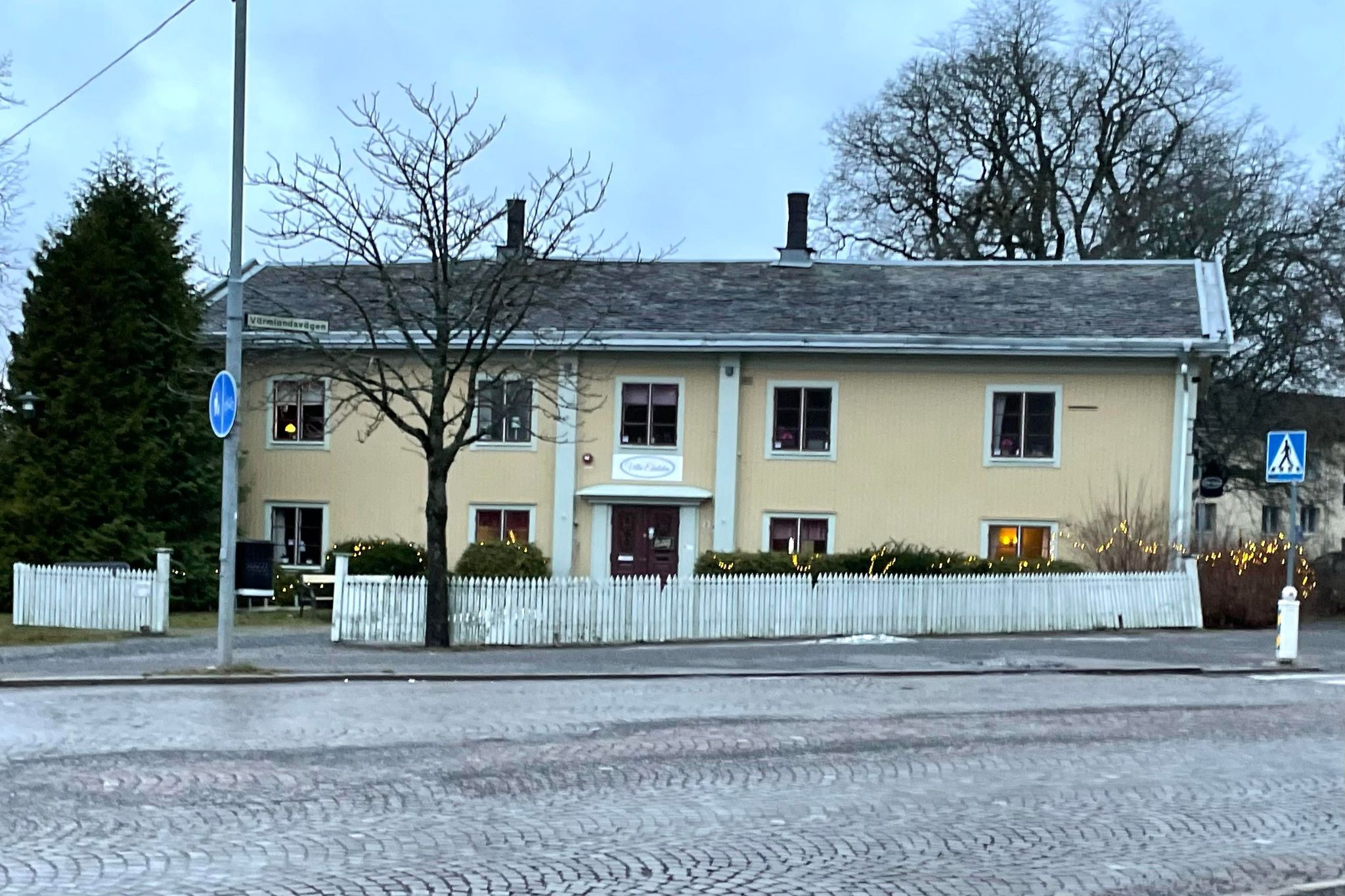
- Villa Ekeliden
- Interactive map of the Villa Ekeliden area

General information
- Status: Completed
- Type: Multi-purpose
- Location: Karlskoga, Sweden, Centralplan 2
- Coordinates: 59.3253°N 14.5164°E
- Completed: c. 1810

Villa Ekeliden, located in Karlskoga Municipality, Sweden, holds historical significance as a prominent structure within the city center at Centralplan. Situated alongside an esker to the east, it stands as the second oldest building in Karlskoga, with only the Karlskoga Church predating it in age.

== History ==
Villa Ekeliden, a wooden building adorned in a light-yellow hue and featuring horizontal paneling, has served various purposes throughout its history. It began its journey as a bell-ringer's house and later transformed into a pharmacy, as depicted in Selma Lagerlöf's renowned 1925 novel, "Charlotte Löwensköld," set in 1867. Subsequently, it housed a public library before eventually being repurposed as a restaurant and coffeehouse.
