= Olof Philip Oxehufvud =

Swedish ironmaster (1797–1857)

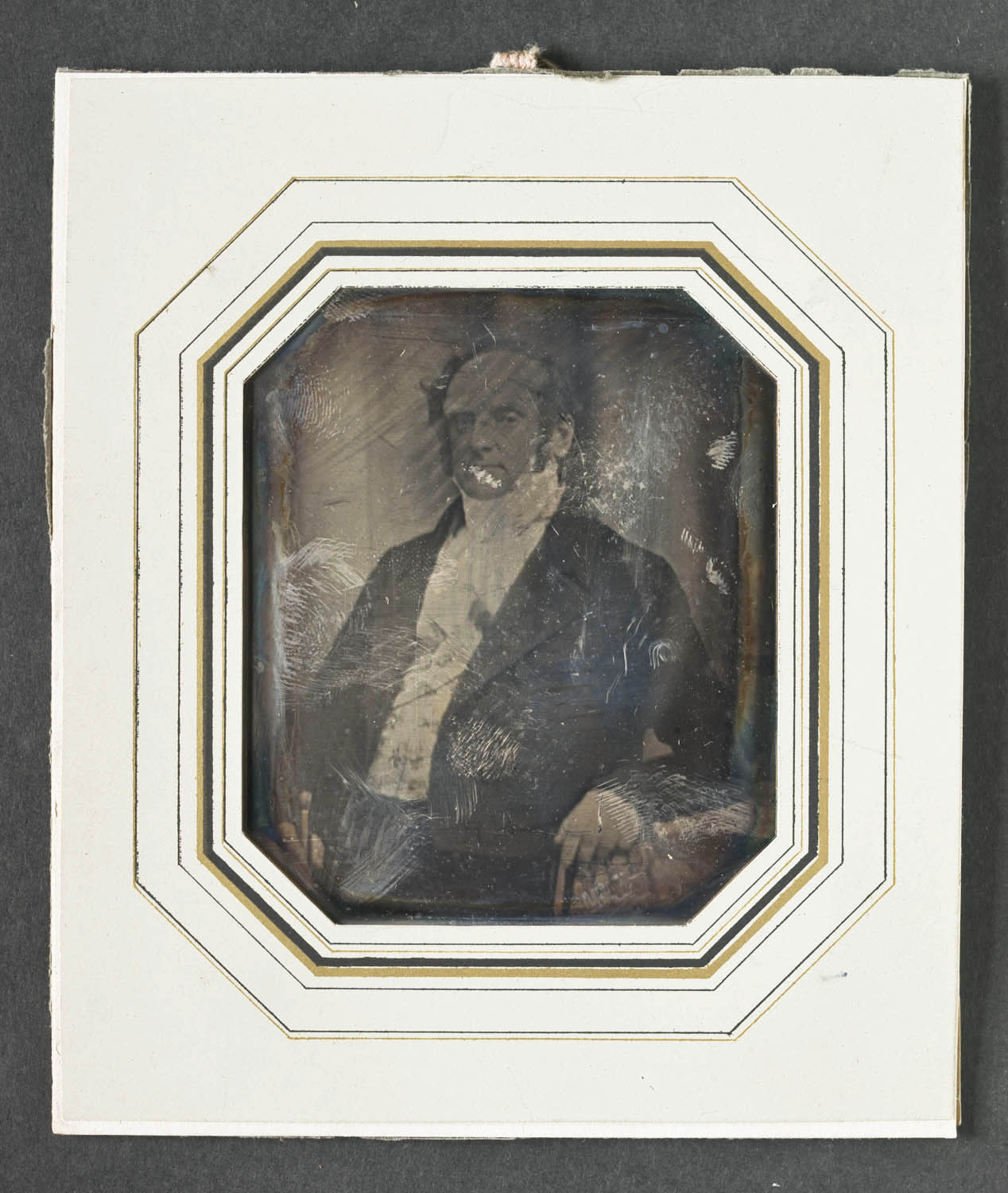
- Daguerreotype of Olof Philip Oxehufvud
- Born: 25 August 1797
- Died: 22 March 1857 (aged 59); Björkborn, Karlskoga, Örebro County, Sweden
- Resting place: Karlskoga Old Cemetery
- Spouse: Christina Melin (m. 1830)
- Children: Christer Oxehufvud

Olof Philip Oxehufvud (Swedish pronunciation: [ˈʊ̂ksɛːˌhʉːvʉːɖ]; 25 August 1797 – 22 March 1857), was a Swedish jurist and hovjunkare.

== Life and work ==
Olof Philip Oxehufvud was born into the Oxehufvud family. He was the first of seven children to Bo Oxehufvud and Christina Bonde.

Oxehufvud served as chief district judge in Sundbo, Grimsten, Kumla, Hardemo, Edsberg and Lekeberg. In the 1840s, he acquired the Björkborn Ironworks, the progenitor of Bofors.

In 1852, he was appointed Knight of the Order of the Polar Star.

Oxehufvud married Johanna Catharina "Kitty" Melin in 1830. He died on 22 March 1857 at Björkborn Manor.
