= Gerum Church =

- Gerum kyrka
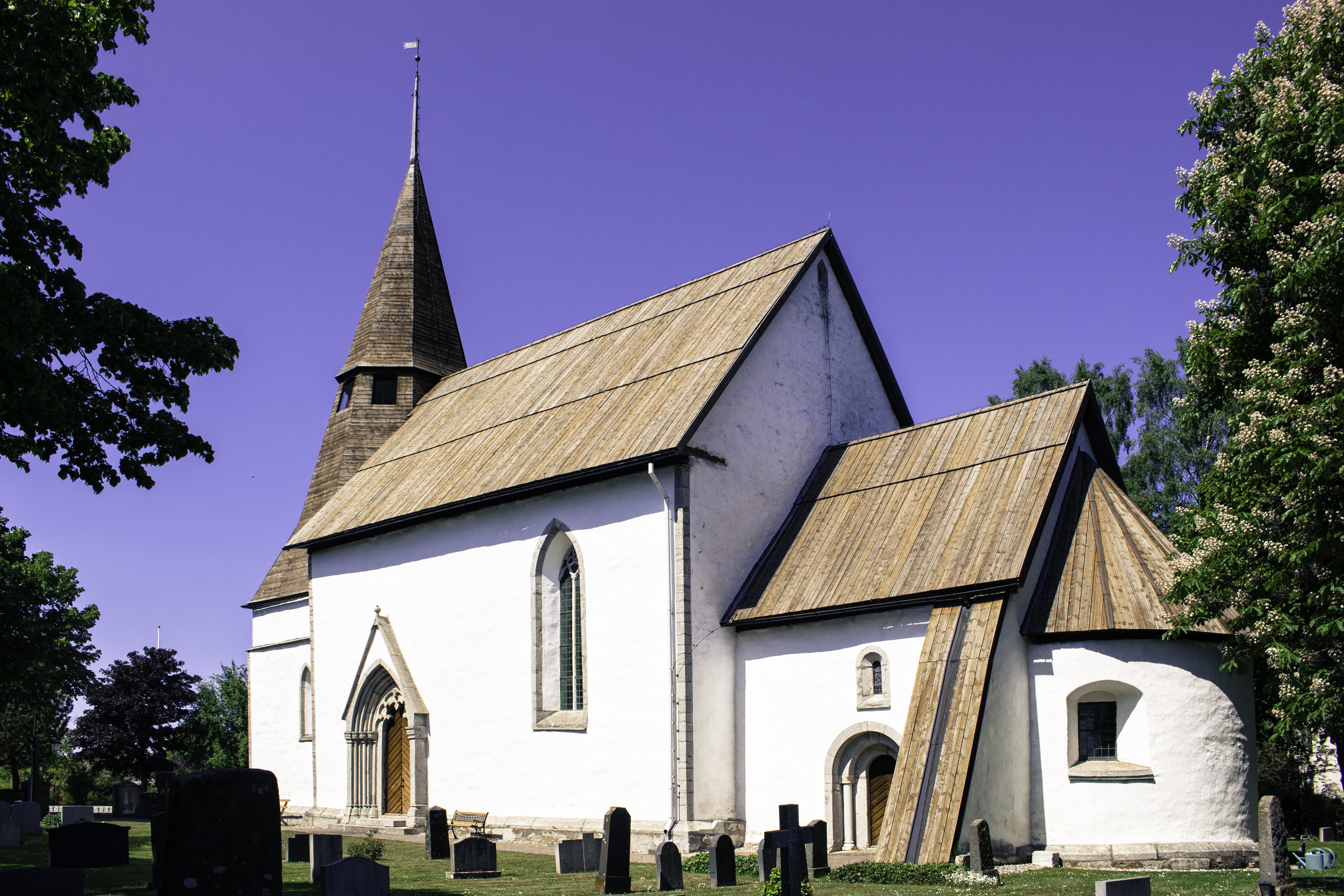
- Gerum Church, view of the exterior

- Location on Gotland
- 57°17′40″N 18°19′47″E
- Country: Sweden
- Denomination: Church of Sweden

Administration
- Diocese: Visby

Gerum Church (Swedish: Gerum kyrka) is a medieval church in Gerum on the Swedish island of Gotland, built between c. 1200 and 1300. It is used by the Church of Sweden.

== History and architecture ==
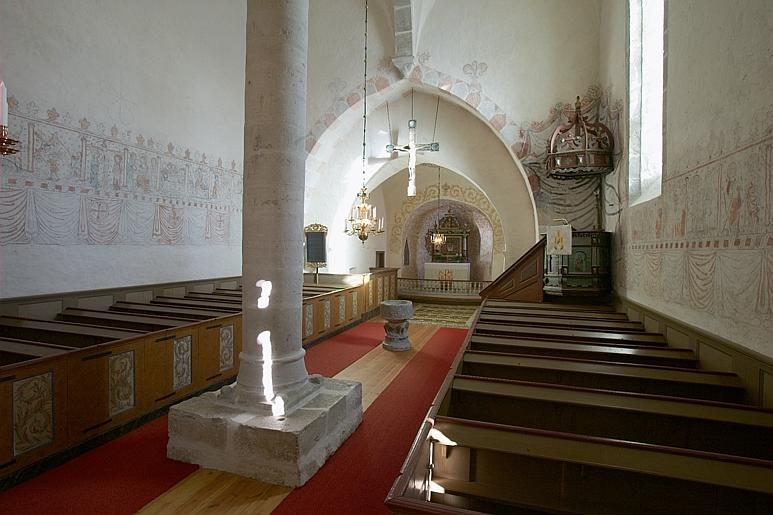
View of the interior towards the choir

The oldest parts of Gerum Church are the choir and apse, dating from circa 1200 and Romanesque in style. The presently visible, Gothic nave dates from a later time of the 13th century and probably replaced an earlier, Romanesque nave. The tower, which was never finished, was built circa 1300. The only non-medieval part of the church is the sacristy, built in 1835.

Gerum Church is constructed of limestone. The exterior is whitewashed apart from several finely carved stone details. The façade is broken by four windows on the southern side while the northern completely lacks windows. The church has three portals, one Romanesque in the choir and two Gothic in the nave and tower, respectively. The Gothic portals are decorated with stone sculptures.

Inside, the church has murals from at least three different periods: the 13th century, the 15th century by the Master of the Passion of Christ (Passionsmästaren) and the 18th century. The church also has a decorated stained glass window from the 14th century. The baptismal font of sandstone from the latter part of the 12th century is a work by a Gotlandic sculptor known today by the notname Majestatis.

It belongs to the Diocese of Visby.
