= Nils von Hofsten =

Swedish politician (1828–1912)

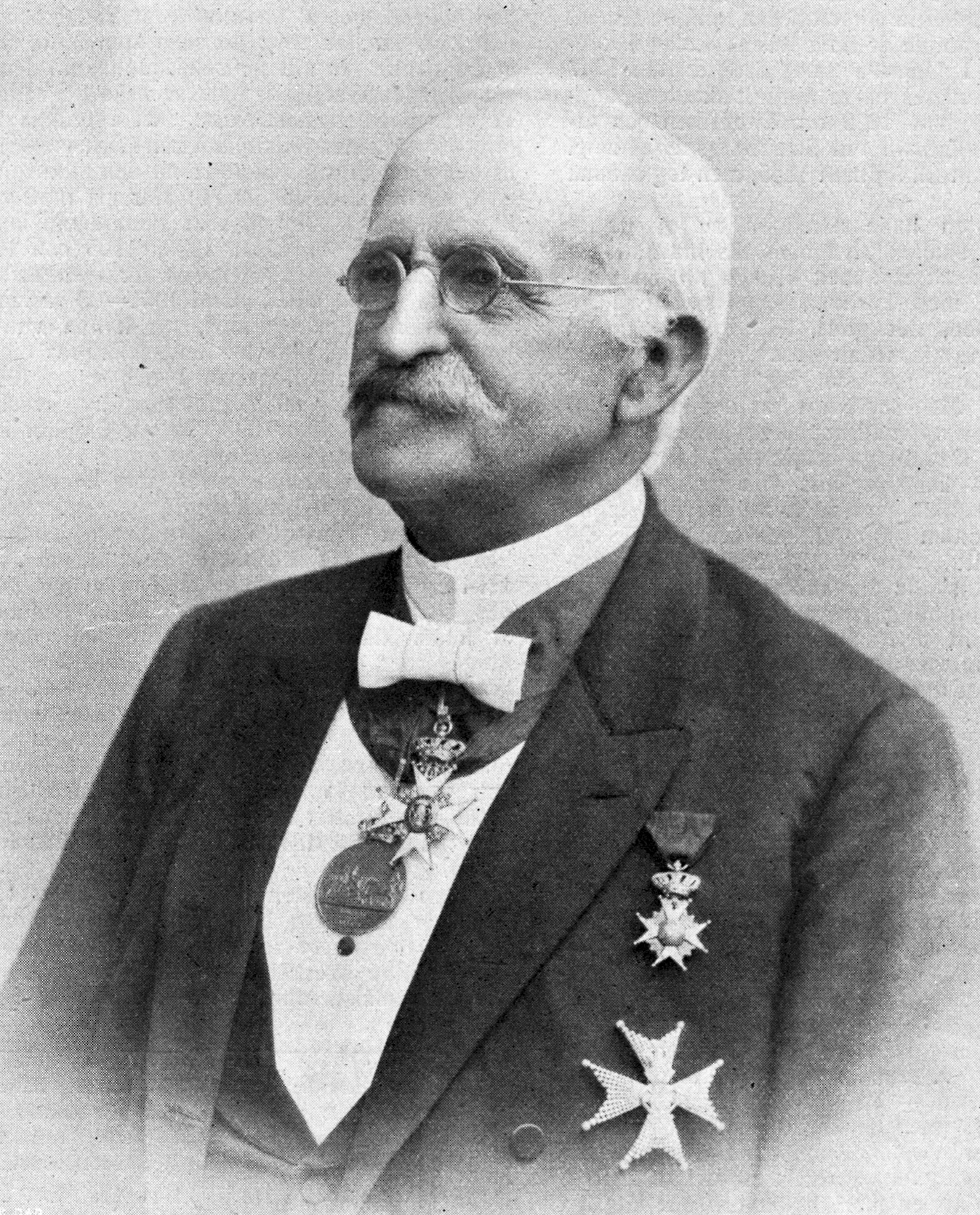

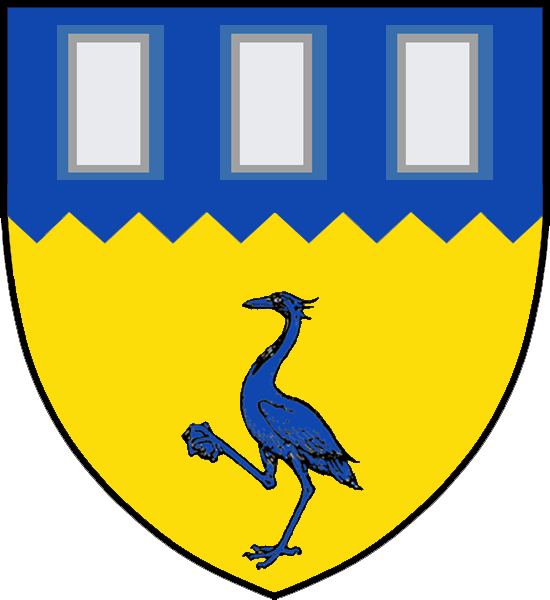
- Coat of arms
- Born: 19 September 1828; Valåsen Manor, Karlskoga, Örebro County, Sweden
- Died: 12 March 1912 (aged 83); Västra Gerum
- Spouses: Louisa von Hofsten (m. 1852) Anna Sparre (m. 1872)
- Father: Erland von Hofsten
- Occupation: Politician

Nils Eberhard Hjalmar von Hofsten (Swedish pronunciation: [fɔn hɔfˈstɛːn]; 13 September 1828 – 12 March 1912), was a Swedish politician.

== Life and work ==
Nils von Hofsten was born on September 13, 1828, at Valåsen Manor, Karlskoga, Sweden, and was the third of five children of Erland and Johanna von Hofsten (née Nordenfeldt). His father was an ironmaster at Valåsen Works.

Von Hofsten was a member of the Riksdag of the Estates 1865–1866, and of the Första kammaren 1867–1875.

Von Hofsten married Countess Anna Fredrika Sparre af Söfdeborg.
