= Möckelsbodar =

Former settlement in Sweden

Möckelsbodar (Note: Alternative ways of spelling this location name are "Möckelns bodar", "Möckelsboderna", or "Bodarna".) (lit. 'Möckeln's sheds'; Swedish pronunciation: [ˈmœkːɛlsˌbuːdar]) was a 13th-century to 16th-century settlement established at the northern shore of Lake Möckeln. This settlement is now commonly referred to as the pre-16th century era of Karlskoga's history.

The earliest recorded reference to Möckelsbodar can be found in a legal declaration made by Holdo Olofsson Stråhle and his wife Margarethe on April 9, 1268. Additional sources from the 14th century indicate that there were initial settlements established at the northern shore of Lake Möckeln, including the Sandviken estate, which was owned by the Cistercian nunnery, Riseberga Abbey.

In the 1580s, the Möckelsbodar settlement was transferred from Närke to Värmland. Additionally, according to sources, some of the original settlers were Finns. These settlers are also referred to as "Forest Finns," as they were part of the ethnic group that settled in the forested areas of Sweden proper during the late 16th and early to mid-17th centuries.

The name "Karlskoga" was coined in the 1590s and has been in use ever since then. It is derived from the name Charles (Karl) IX, with "skog" meaning woods.

== See also ==
- Timeline of Karlskoga
