= Gerum =

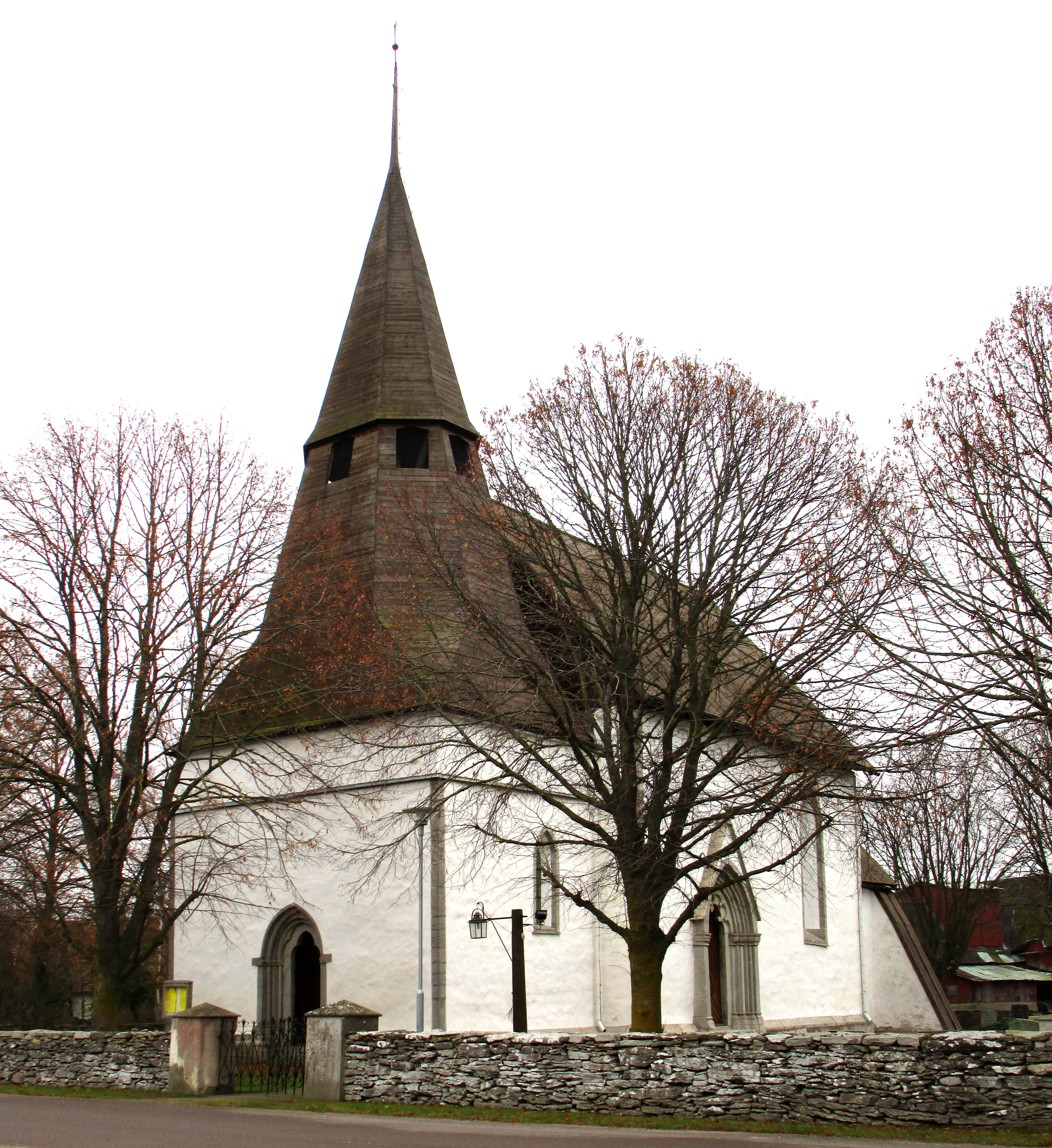
- Gerum Church

- Location within Gotland
- Coordinates: 57°17′40″N 18°19′46″E
- Country: Sweden
- Province: Gotland
- County: Gotland County
- Municipality: Gotland Municipality

Area
  - Total: 13.57 km^{2} (5.24 sq mi)

Population (2014)
  - Total: 66
- Time zone: UTC+1 (CET)
  - Summer (DST): UTC+2 (CEST)

Gerum is a populated area, a socken (not to be confused with parish), on the Swedish island of Gotland. It comprises the same area as the administrative Gerum District, established on 1 January 2016.

== Geography ==
Gerum is situated in the south central part of Gotland. The medieval Gerum Church is located in the socken. As of 2019, Gerum Church belongs to Gerum parish in Fardhems pastorat.

In the south part of Gerum is the 15 ha (37 acres) Sandarve Kulle nature reserve. The reserve was established in 1984, and comprises a large limestone cliff rising about 20–30 m (66–98 ft) over the surrounding landscape. Its highest point is at an elevation of 60 m (200 ft).
