= Möckeln =

Lake in Sweden

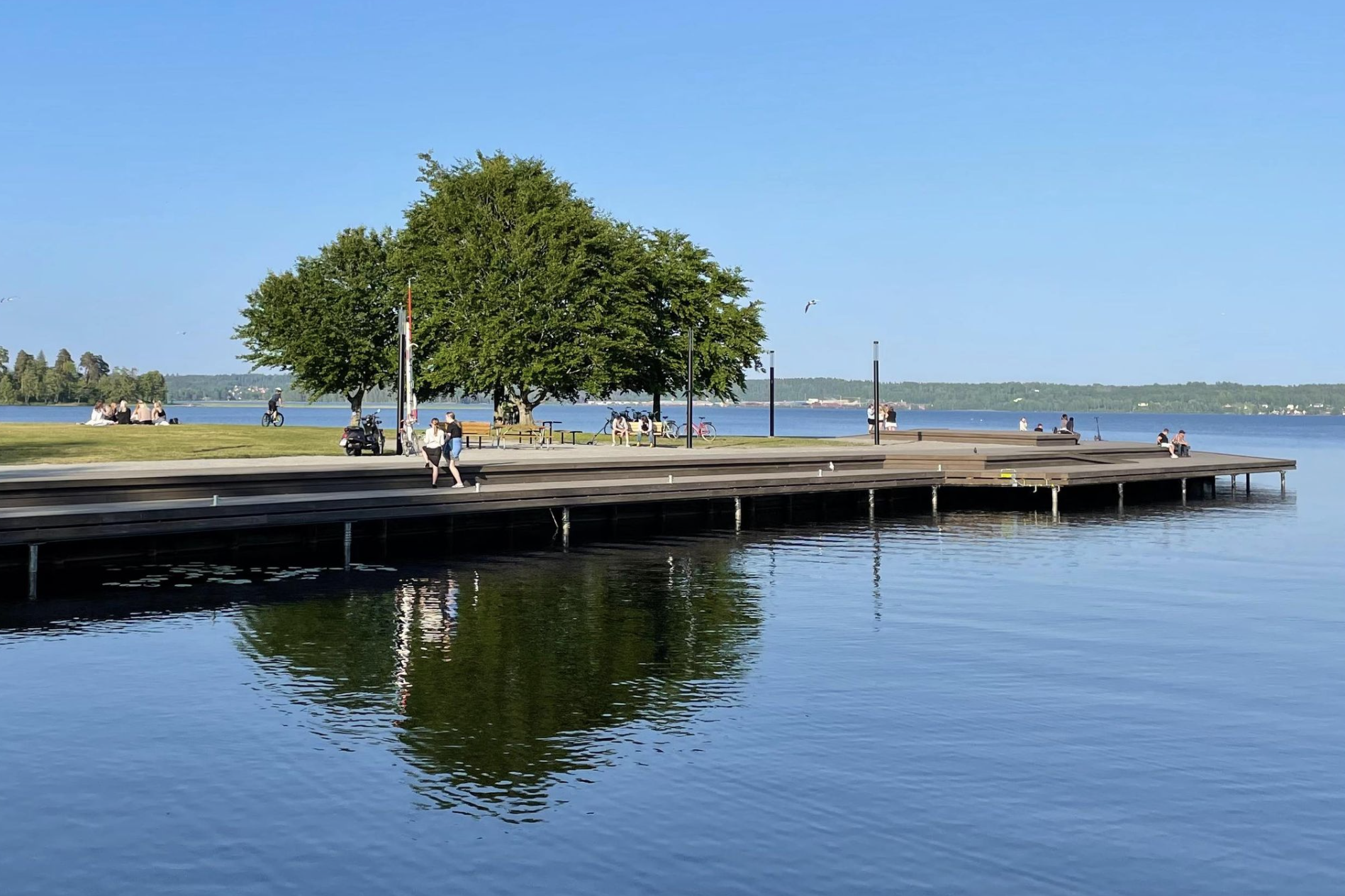
- Lake Möckeln

- Location within Örebro Location within Southern Sweden Location within Sweden
- Coordinates: 59°17′20″N 14°30′00″E
- Type: Lake
- Primary outflows: Gullspångsälven
- Basin countries: Sweden
- Max. depth: 25.5 metres (84 ft)
- Settlements: Karlskoga, Degerfors and Valåsen och Labbsand

Möckeln (Note: Sometimes also "Myckeln".) is a lake in Karlskoga and Degerfors Municipalities in Örebro County, Sweden.

Except for the settlements surrounding the lake, Degernäs Manor is situated at the southernmost tip of the lake and Valåsen Manor just north of the Valåsen and Labbsand-settlement, overlooking the northeastern parts of the lake.

== Fauna ==
Species of Zander (Sander lucioperca), European perch (Perca fluviatilis) and Northern pike (Esox lucius) are most frequently fished here.

== Geology ==
Möckeln lake formed in place of a meteorite impact crater. Geological surveys in 2011 led by the geophysicist Herbert Henkel, formerly active at the Royal Institute of Technology, established that Möckeln lake northern end towards Karlskoga is a degraded meteorite impact crater with an original diameter of about 4.5 km. The meteorite that crashed is estimated to have a diameter of no more than a couple of hundred meters. The crater formation is lowered about 400 meters below the then ground surface and is now about 3 km in diameter. The crater has been deformed somewhat by the excess of a heavy rocks at the east of the lake and it is also affected by erosion. Other examples of known impact craters in Sweden are Siljan Ring, Dellen and Mien.

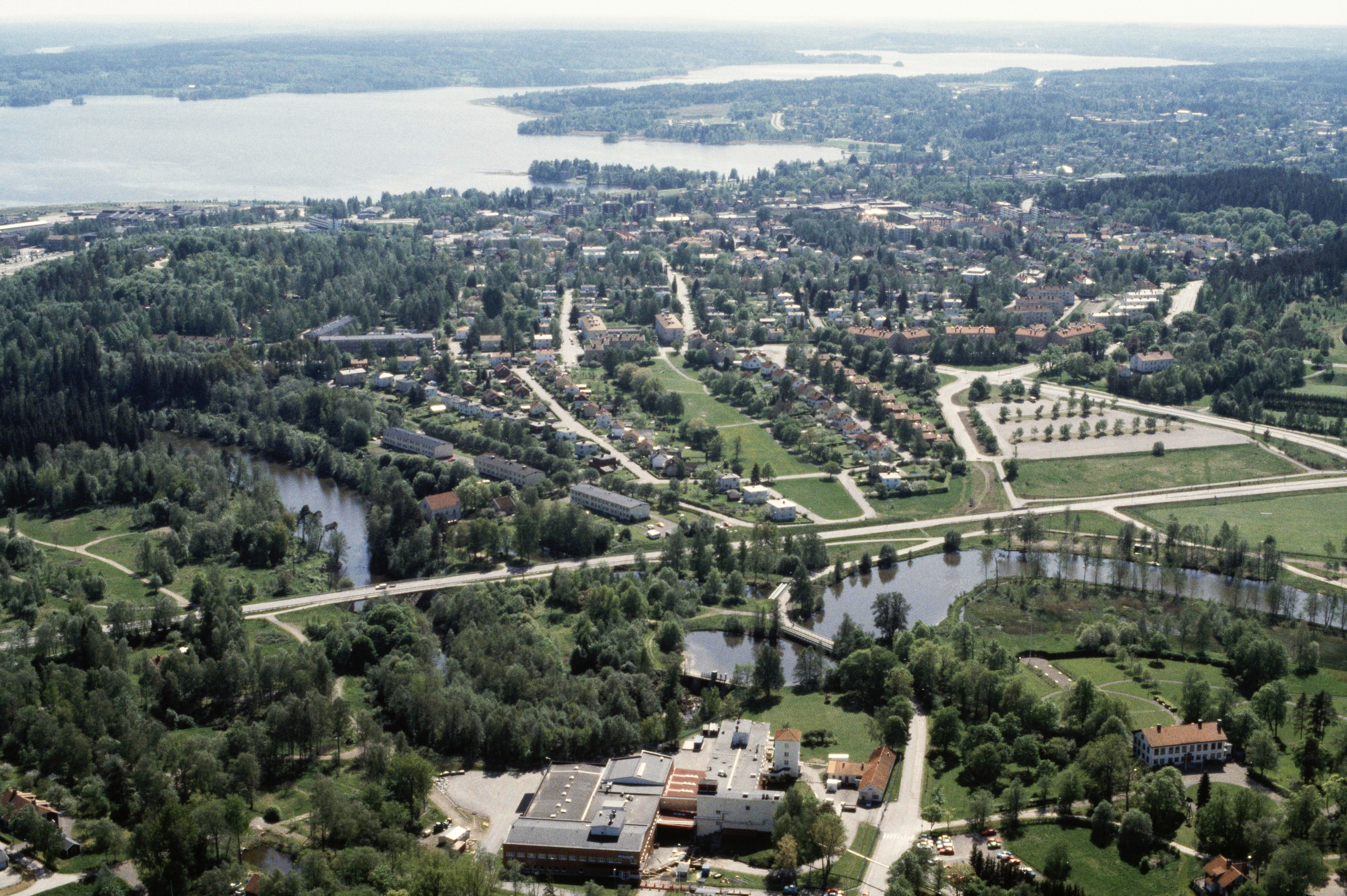
Aerial view of Möckeln, with Björkborn Manor, Alfred Nobel's last residence, in the foreground

== Popular culture ==
A fictional lake, named "Nöckeln", appears in the Bert Diaries by Anders Jacobsson and Sören Olsson.

== See also ==
- Lakes of Sweden
