= Gerhard Ysing =

Swedish ironmaster and merchant

Gerhard Arentsson Ysing (Note: Sometimes referred to as "Gerdt".) (1603 – 1673), was a Swedish ironmaster and merchant, known as Karlskoga's first industrialist.

Gerhard Arentsson Ysing was a native of Stade, Germany. Ysing practiced in Örebro in the 17th century, and in the 1630s, he acquired the Valåsen Ironworks from Arvid Bengtsson, but Ysing never settled there.

In 1672, he donated a chandelier to the Karlskoga Church. Ysing married twice.

Ysing died in Örebro in 1673.
