= Robsahm =

Robsahm is a surname. It may refer to:

- Fred Robsahm (1943-2015), Norwegian film actor
- Margarete Robsahm (born 1942), Norwegian model, actress and director
- Maria Robsahm, earlier Maria Carlshamre, (born 1957), Swedish politician and Member of the European Parliament from 2004 to 2009
- Thomas Robsahm (born 1964), Norwegian actor, film director and producer
