= Björkborn Manor =

Museum about Alfred Nobel in Karlskoga, Sweden

Coordinates: 59°20′25″N 14°32′05″E

- Björkborns herrgård
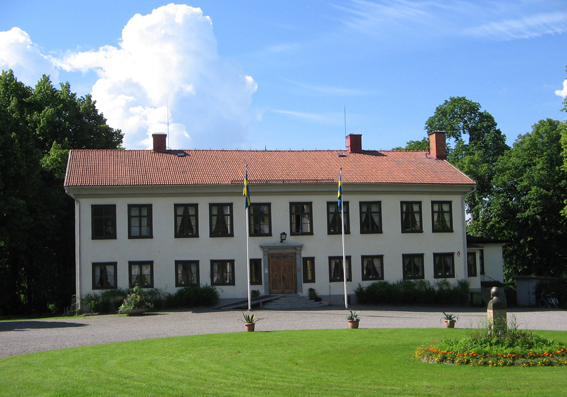

General information
- Type: Manor house
- Location: Björkbornsvägen 10, Karlskoga, Sweden
- Construction started: 19th century
- Completed: 1810s

Design and construction
- Known for: Alfred Nobel

Website
- Björkborn Manor

Björkborn Manor (Note: The building is often referred to as "Alfred Nobel's Björkborn", its initial name was "Beckborn".) (Swedish: Björkborns herrgård, Swedish pronunciation: [bjœːrkboːɳ]) is a manor house and the very last residence of Alfred Nobel in Sweden. The manor is located in Karlskoga Municipality, Örebro County, Sweden. The current-standing white-colored manor house was built in the 1810s, but the history of the property is older.

Björkborn Manor is the site of an Alfred Nobel museum. It had a role in the process of the creation of the Nobel Prize and the Nobel Foundation.

Björkborn is located within a park-like garden, that is bordered by a river to the west and south, and by an industrial area to the north.

== History ==
=== First house on the site ===
Established as an ironworks in 1639, by Mårten Drost. Crispin Flygge acquired the property in the 1670s, then passed it over to his widow, Sigrid Ekehielm. In 1703, Björkborn was acquired by Jakob Christiansson Robsahm.

The former-standing manor was built in the 17th century. It included a park-like garden, but which plants were grown is unknown. The Björkborn Ironworks was wound down in 1901.

The ironworks was powered by the surrounding waterfalls.

=== Current-standing house ===
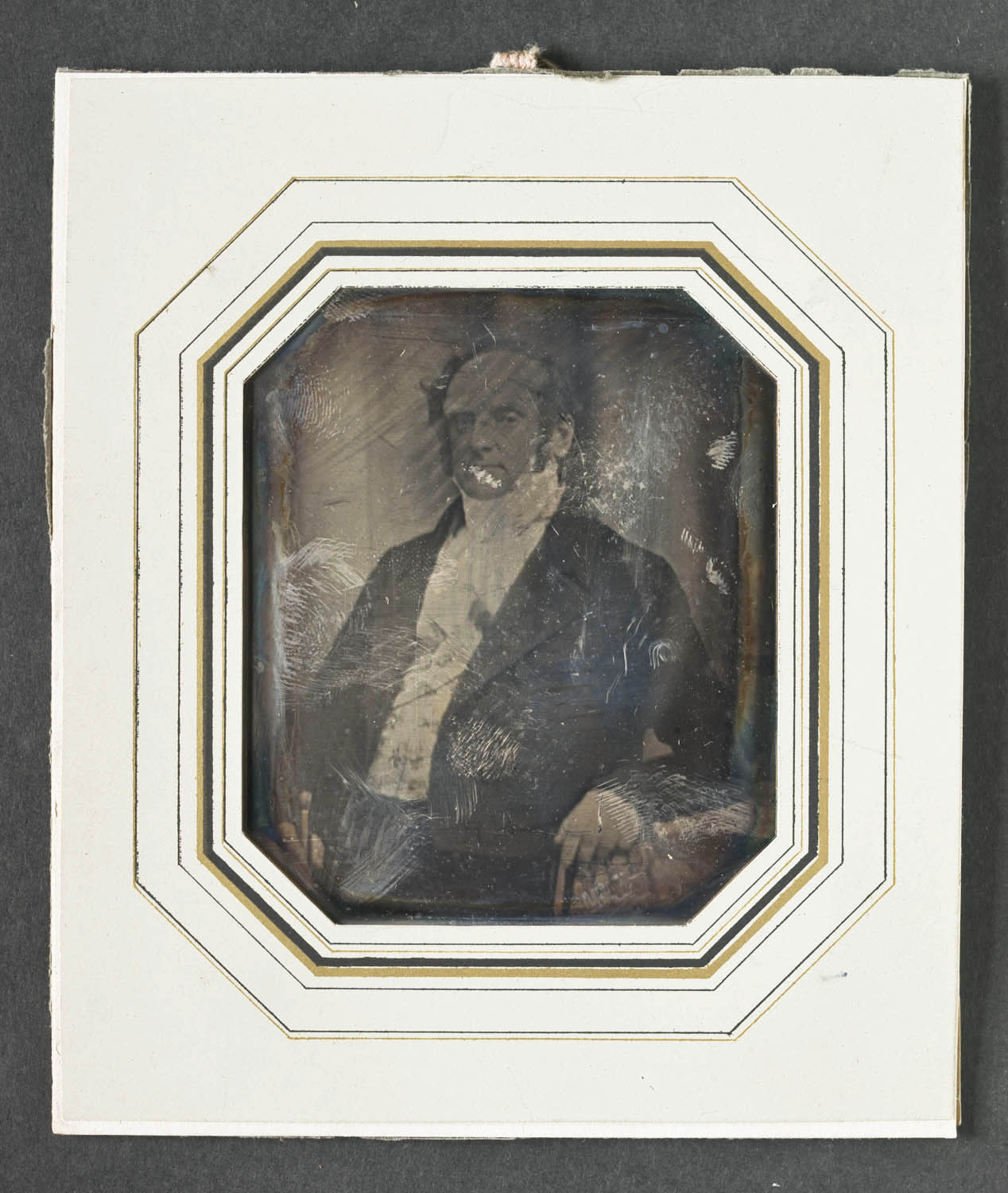
Daguerreotype of Olof Philip Oxehufvud

The current manor was completed in 1814 with the purpose of serving as residence for the family who owned Björkborn Ironworks. Robsahm's descendants resided at the property until the 19th century. After the Robsahm era was over, it was acquired by Olof Philip Oxehufvud. In 1873, K.G. Oxehufvud sold the properties to the Bofors-Gullspång company.

Few remains are preserved of the ironworks.

Over the years, the manor has served as residence for members of various prominent Swedish families, e.g. the Robsahm, Geijer, Lagerhjelm, Mitander, Oxehufvud and Myhrman families.

== Alfred Nobel ==
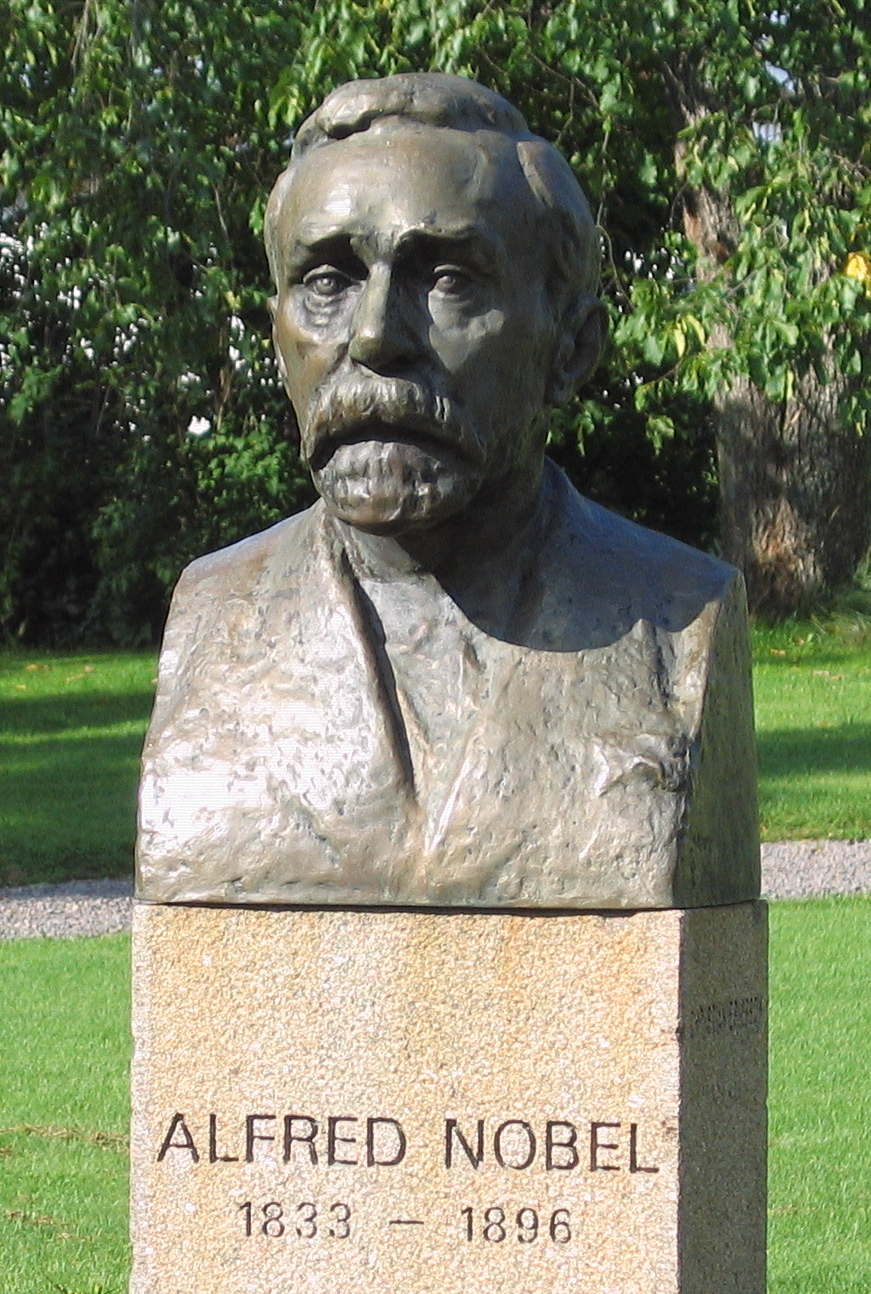
Bust of Alfred Nobel at Björkborn

During the summers of 1894–1896 Alfred Nobel lived in the manor house Björkborn. Even though he died in his villa in Sanremo, Italy and had a home in Paris, it was decided that his residence was at Björkborn in Karlskoga. This allowed Nobel’s will to be adjudicated in Karlskoga. The manor was included in the purchase when Alfred Nobel acquired Bofors-Gullspång in 1894. The manor served as the very last residence of Alfred Nobel in Sweden.

Before he had moved in, his nephew, Hjalmar Nobel, conducted a renovation of the building.

The creation of the Nobel Foundation was led from Björkborn Manor by Ragnar Sohlman.

A major part of Alfred Nobel’s private library is still preserved at this site.

=== Museum (1970s to present day) ===
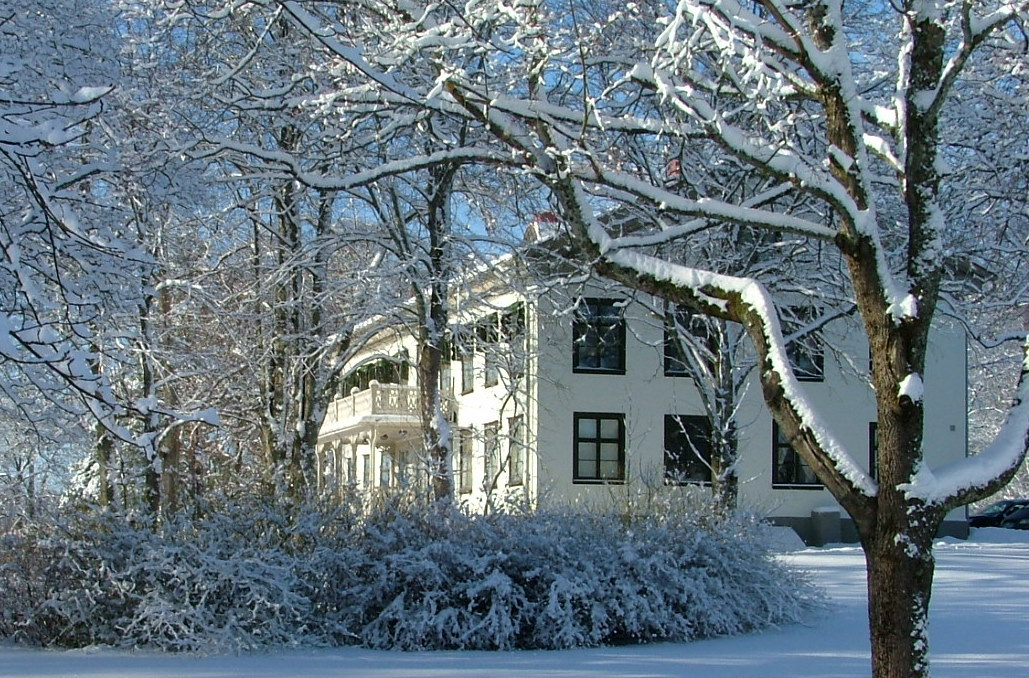
Björkborn Manor

In 1978, the Nobel Museum opened at Björkborn. The site hosts a science center, an exhibition on the Nobel Prize and an industry museum on the history of Bofors. The site has around 10,000 annual visitors.

The museum offers dramatized guided tours to the public.

Conferences can also be hosted at this location.

== Official visits ==
In 1895, the then King of Sweden, Oscar II, visited Björkborn.

The current King and Queen of Sweden, Carl XVI Gustaf and Silvia, visited Björkborn Manor in 2013 during their official visit to Örebro County.

== See also ==
- Bofors
- Björkborn Bridge
- List of castles and palaces in Sweden
- Nobel Laboratory
- Nobel Prize Museum
