= Bengt von Hofsten =

Swedish ironmaster (1747–1826)

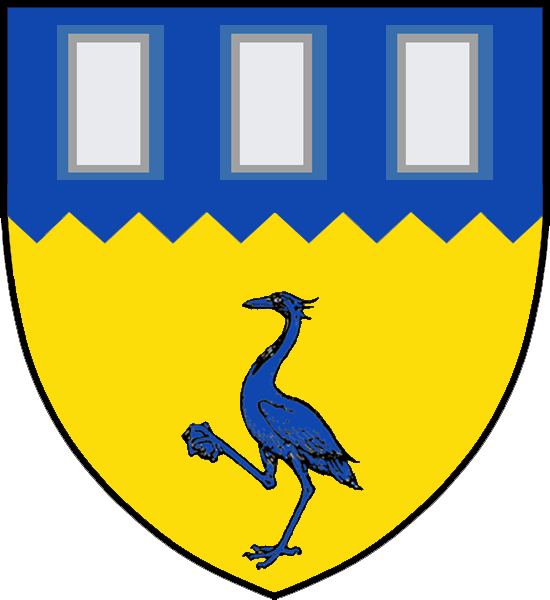
- Coat of arms
- Born: 17 June 1747; Karlskoga, Örebro County, Sweden
- Died: 10 November 1826 (aged 79); Hönsäter, Sweden
- Spouse: Christina Lovisa Geijer (m. 1779)
- Issue: Erland
- Father: Erland von Hofsten
- Occupation: Ironmaster

Bengt von Hofsten (Swedish pronunciation: [fɔn hɔfˈstɛːn]; 17 June 1747 – 10 November 1826), was a Swedish ironmaster and hovjunkare.

== Life and work ==
Bengt von Hofsten was born on June 17, 1747, in Karlskoga, Sweden, and was the third of five children of Erland and Christina von Hofsten (née Kolthoff). His father was an ironmaster at both Valåsen and Villingsberg Works. In 1760, he enrolled at Uppsala University.

In 1779, Bengt von Hofsten married Christina Lovisa Geijer at Lindfors Works, known as "nåda på Valåsen".

In 1796, Von Hofsten acquired Hönsäter Manor.
