= Erland von Hofsten (ironmaster, born 1780) =

Swedish ironmaster (1780–1839)

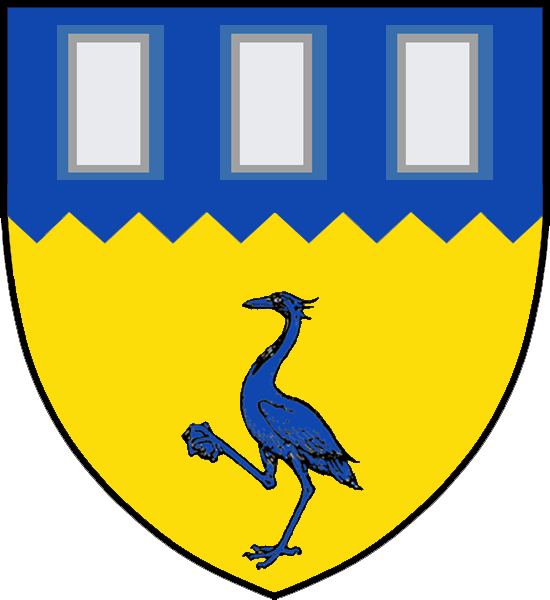
- Coat of arms
- Born: 19 September 1780; Valåsen Manor, Karlskoga, Örebro County, Sweden
- Died: 10 December 1839 (aged 59); Stockholm, Sweden
- Buried: Karlskoga Old Cemetery
- Spouse: Johanna Nordenfeldt (m. 1822)
- Issue: Bengt; Nils; Johanna Christina
- Father: Bengt von Hofsten
- Mother: Christina Lovisa Geijer
- Occupation: Ironmaster

Erland von Hofsten (Swedish pronunciation: [fɔn hɔfˈstɛːn]; 19 September 1780 – 10 December 1839), was a Swedish ironmaster, and heir to the Valåsen Works.

== Life and work ==
Erland von Hofsten was born on September 19, 1780, at Valåsen Manor, Karlskoga, Sweden, and was the first of nine children of Bengt and Christina Lovisa von Hofsten (née Geijer). His father was an ironmaster at Valåsen Works. In 1793, he enrolled at Uppsala University.

In 1805, he served as a clerk at the administrative courts of appeal in Sweden.

In 1822, Erland von Hofsten married Johanna Nordenfeldt. The couple's daughter, Johanna Christina von Hofsten, was a children's writer.

Hofsten died on December 10, 1810, in Stockholm. He and his wife were buried at the Karlskoga Old Cemetery, near Karlskoga Church.
