= Villingsberg =

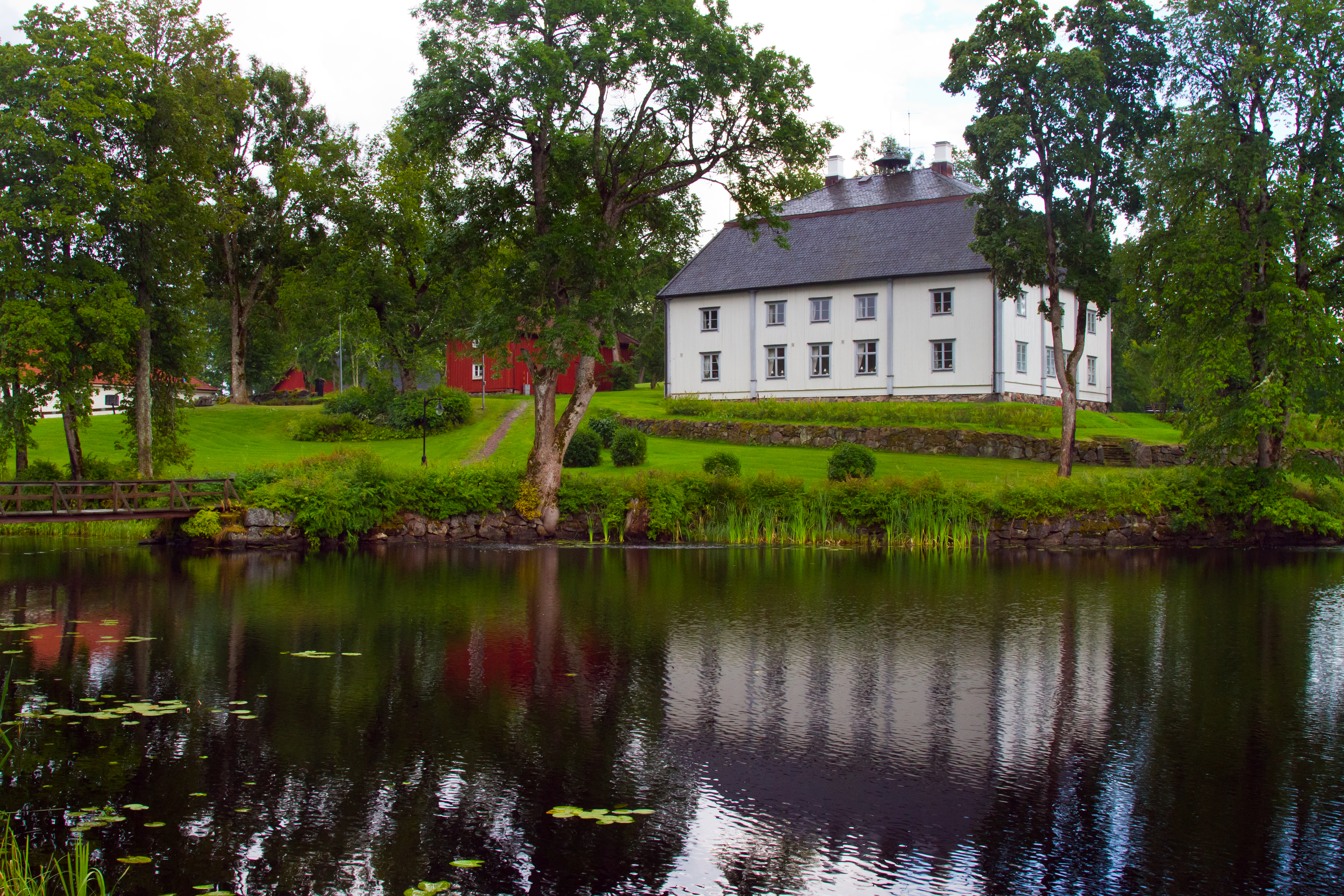
- Villingsberg Manor

- Location within Örebro Location within Sweden
- Coordinates: 59°16′56″N 14°41′27″E
- Country: Sweden
- Province: Närke
- County: Örebro County
- Municipality: Karlskoga Municipality

Population (2000)
  - Total: 52
- Time zone: UTC+1 (CET)
  - Summer (DST): UTC+2 (CEST)

Villingsberg (Swedish pronunciation: [vɪɭɪngs'bɛrg]) is a former locality situated in Karlskoga Municipality, Örebro County, Sweden with 52 inhabitants in 2000. It is located east of Karlskoga, by the European route E18. It is associated with the military training field Villingsberg Training Area, which is located north of the proper village.

The locality was removed from the list of Swedish localities in 2005 as the settlement's population had declined below 50 inhabitants, which is the minimum number of inhabitants to get recognized as a smaller urban settlement (Swedish: tätort) by the Swedish Authorities.

The village's most notable building, the Villingsberg Manor, was completed in 1752.

In the 19th century, Villingsberg had a school. In 1851, 56 children were recorded as attendees of the school.

== Bibliography ==
- Reinestam, Reinert (1966), Knista socken (in Swedish), vol. 2
