= Björkborn Bridge =

Björkborn Bridge Björkbornsbron
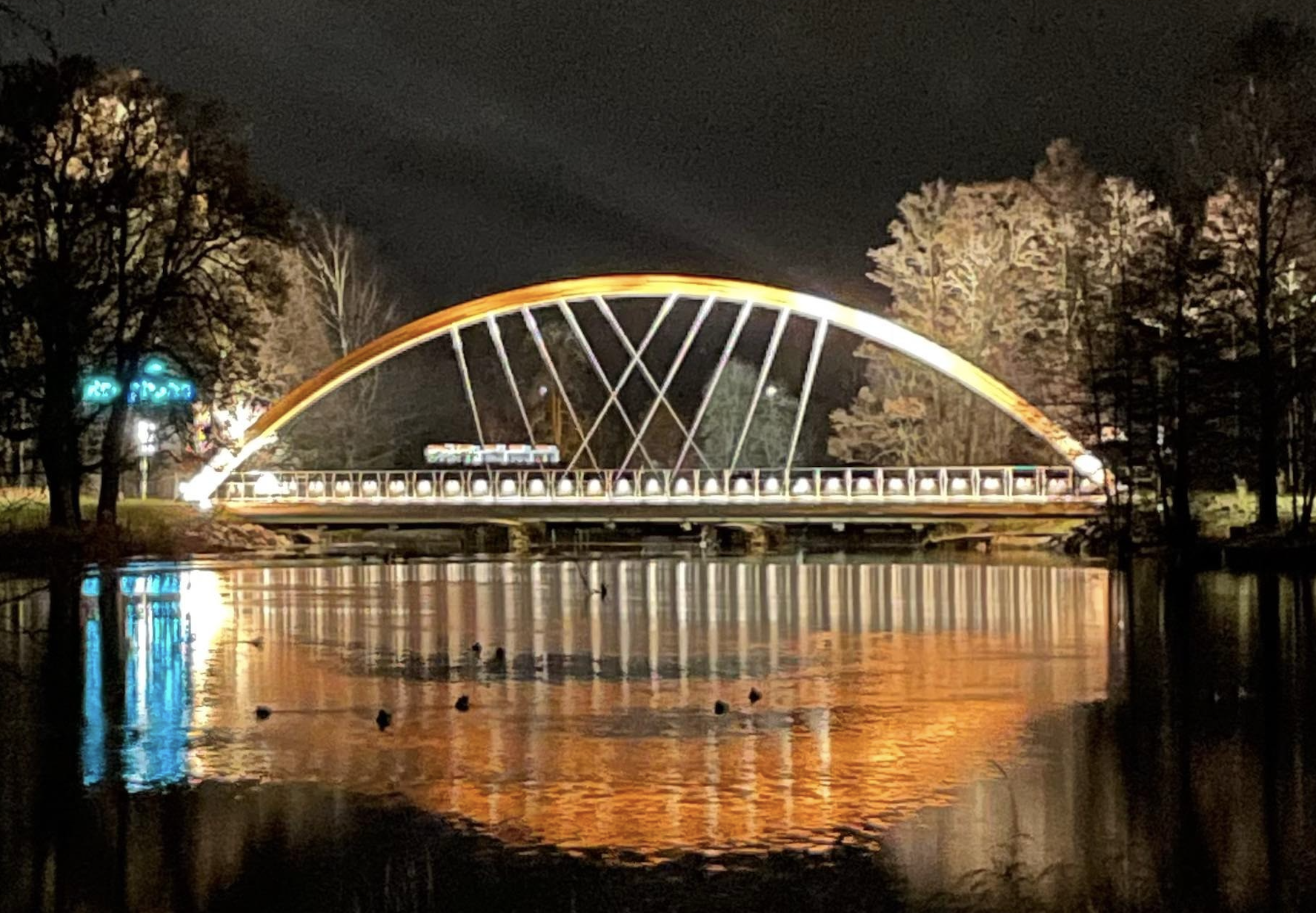
- The Björkborn Bridge by night in December 2022
- Coordinates: 59°20′20″N 14°32′08″E
- Crosses: Timsälven

Characteristics
- Design: Tied-arch bridge

History
- Opened: 2022

The Björkborn Bridge (Swedish: Björkbornsbron) is a wooden arch bridge for pedestrians and bikers crossing Timsälven in Karlskoga, Sweden, linking the former residence of Alfred Nobel; Björkborn Manor, and the surrounding area, with Karlskoga. The bridge, was erected following the demolition of the, poorly maintained, former-standing bridge, in 2018. The now-standing bridge was designed in collaboration with three architecture students; Kristoffer Hamrin, Nour Fansa and Mateusz Szpotowicz from the architectural department at KTH Royal Institute of Technology.

The bridge opened on Walpurgis Night in 2022. The governor of Örebro County, Maria Larsson, and the chairman of the municipal board, Tony Ring, attended the opening ceremony.
