= Kilsbergen =

Ridge in Sweden

Coordinates: 59°19′33″N 14°55′21″E

Kilsbergen is a low mountainous ridge that separates Närke from Värmland. It is the southernmost extension of the taiga in Scandinavia and shows a flora and fauna that are unusual for the latitude. There are several skiing and hiking facilities in Kilsbergen.
Kilsbergen is especially known for its elk population. It was awarded the 1998 Elk Protection medal by Hans Hoffberg in 1993 and these magnificent beasts continue to thrive in the area. The highest elevation is at Tomasbodahöjden, 298 metres (978 ft) above sea level and the highest point of the province of Närke. The administrative region of Örebro County has higher slopes further to the north.

== Climate ==
Being located in the slope formation, the Suttarboda weather station has a humid continental climate. The area has frequent orographic lift and temperature inversion during nights compared to the surrounding plains where the nearest town Örebro is located. The diurnal temperature variation is also often low, courtesy of daytime air cooling at the higher elevation in the slope. SMHI have hosted a weather station since August 1995, leading to records being confined to a shorter timespan than other Swedish stations. Still, during that timeframe, Örebro's airport station has recorded several degrees both warmer and colder extremes than Kilsbergen.

Climate data for Kilsbergen-Suttarboda (2002–2021 averages, extremes since 1995)
Month	Jan	Feb	Mar	Apr	May	Jun	Jul	Aug	Sep	Oct	Nov	Dec	Year
Record high °C (°F)	8.9 (48.0)	12.5 (54.5)	17.3 (63.1)	23.5 (74.3)	26.7 (80.1)	29.3 (84.7)	32.9 (91.2)	31.1 (88.0)	25.7 (78.3)	19.9 (67.8)	15.3 (59.5)	10.8 (51.4)	32.9 (91.2)
Mean maximum °C (°F)	5.4 (41.7)	5.9 (42.6)	11.2 (52.2)	17.6 (63.7)	23.0 (73.4)	25.6 (78.1)	27.2 (81.0)	26.0 (78.8)	20.8 (69.4)	14.6 (58.3)	10.1 (50.2)	6.4 (43.5)	28.3 (82.9)
Mean daily maximum °C (°F)	−0.8 (30.6)	−0.3 (31.5)	3.8 (38.8)	10.0 (50.0)	15.2 (59.4)	19.2 (66.6)	21.4 (70.5)	19.8 (67.6)	15.2 (59.4)	8.7 (47.7)	3.9 (39.0)	0.9 (33.6)	9.8 (49.6)
Daily mean °C (°F)	−2.9 (26.8)	−2.3 (27.9)	0.6 (33.1)	5.7 (42.3)	10.7 (51.3)	14.8 (58.6)	17.2 (63.0)	15.9 (60.6)	11.9 (53.4)	6.2 (43.2)	2.0 (35.6)	−1.2 (29.8)	6.6 (43.8)
Mean daily minimum °C (°F)	−5.0 (23.0)	−4.9 (23.2)	−2.6 (27.3)	1.4 (34.5)	6.1 (43.0)	10.3 (50.5)	12.9 (55.2)	12.0 (53.6)	8.5 (47.3)	3.7 (38.7)	0.1 (32.2)	−3.2 (26.2)	3.3 (37.9)
Mean minimum °C (°F)	−14.4 (6.1)	−12.9 (8.8)	−9.7 (14.5)	−4.1 (24.6)	0.3 (32.5)	5.4 (41.7)	8.1 (46.6)	7.1 (44.8)	2.5 (36.5)	−2.8 (27.0)	−7.3 (18.9)	−11.4 (11.5)	−16.4 (2.5)
Record low °C (°F)	−21.2 (−6.2)	−24.8 (−12.6)	−16.5 (2.3)	−7.8 (18.0)	−2.8 (27.0)	2.5 (36.5)	4.6 (40.3)	2.3 (36.1)	−1.3 (29.7)	−8.3 (17.1)	−13.1 (8.4)	−21.2 (−6.2)	−24.8 (−12.6)
Average precipitation mm (inches)	61.9 (2.44)	46.4 (1.83)	39.3 (1.55)	35.5 (1.40)	68.9 (2.71)	67.5 (2.66)	85.5 (3.37)	88.9 (3.50)	71.2 (2.80)	83.8 (3.30)	71.1 (2.80)	65.0 (2.56)	785 (30.92)
Average precipitation days (≥ 1 mm)	11.1	9.2	8.6	6.8	9.3	10.5	10.8	11.5	9.7	11.0	12.4	12.1	123
Source 1: SMHI Open Data for Kilsbergen, precipitation
Source 2: SMHI Open Data for Kilsbergen, temperature
