= Villingsberg Manor =

Listed historical structure in Karlskoga Municipality

Coordinates: 59.2842°N 14.6932°E

- Villingsbergs herrgård
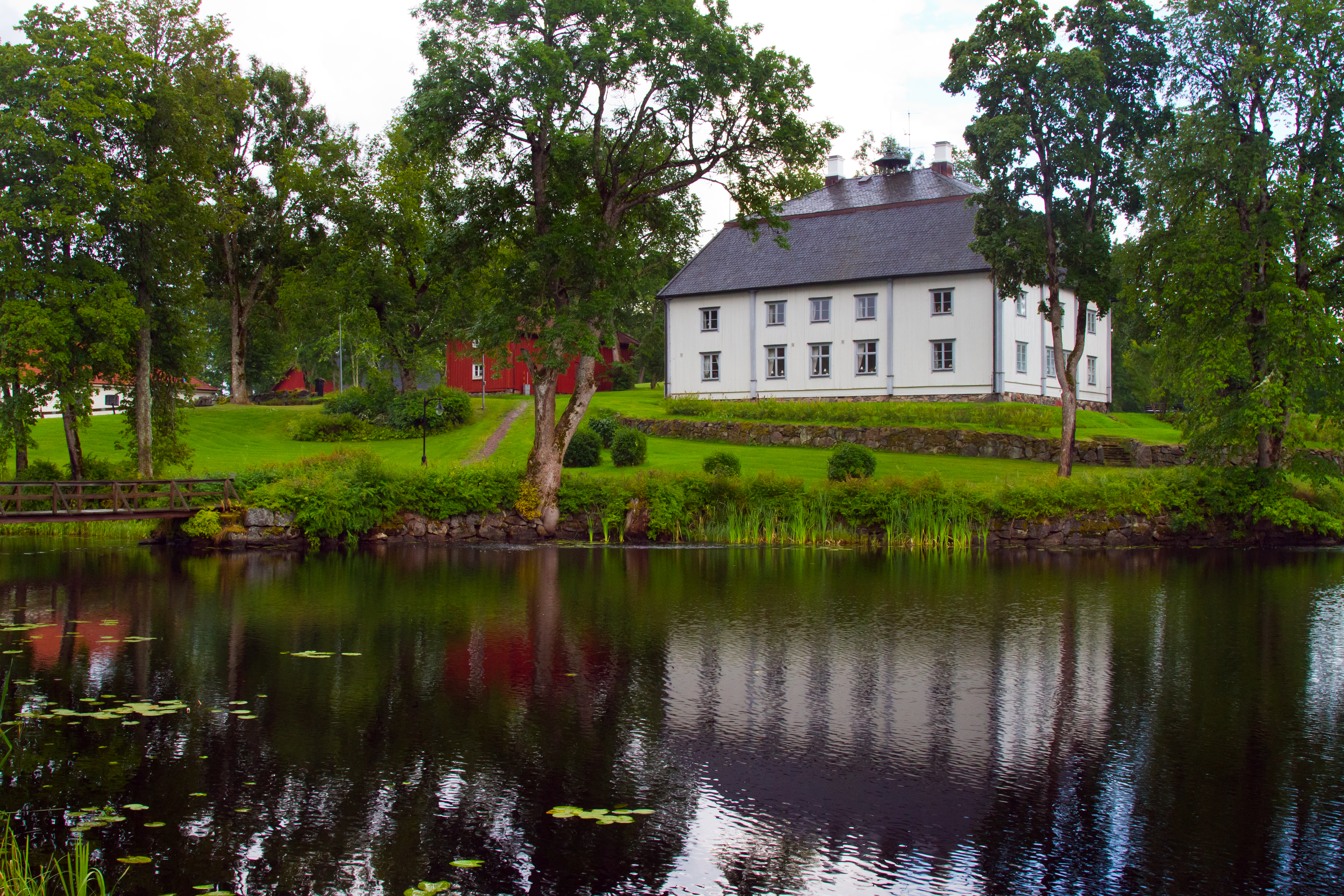
- Villingsberg Manor
- Interactive map of the Villingsberg Manor area

General information
- Location: Villingsberg, Sweden
- Completed: 1752
- Renovated: 2007
- Client: Swedish Fortifications Agency

Villingsberg Manor (Swedish: Villingsbergs herrgård, Swedish pronunciation: [vɪɭɪngs'bɛrg]) is a manor house and former noble residence at Villingsberg, Karlskoga, Örebro County, Sweden. The estate is associated with Villingsberg Ironworks, established in the 1650s. The manor house is one of Karlskoga Municipality's protected historical buildings.

== History ==
Before the acquisition by the von Hofsten family, the estate's owner was Elisabeth Hansdotter Funck. Funck then sold the estate to Bengt Erland von Hofsten, whose descendants would keep on living at the estate for several generations. The current-standing white-colored wooden manor was built and completed in 1752, together with two side buildings that underwent demolishment in 1917. Furthermore, the estate also includes a gazebo, "Diana's Temple", built in the 1830s.

In 1924, the manor house got acquired by Domänverket and in 1942 by the Swedish Armed Forces.

Villingsberg Manor was listed as Swedish historical memorial building in 1947. Its current client is the Swedish Fortifications Agency, and it was renovated in 2007.

== See also ==
- List of castles and palaces in Sweden
