= Skogskyrkogården (disambiguation) =

Skogskyrkogården may refer to:

- Skogskyrkogården, Stockholm, Sweden
- Skogskyrkogården metro station
- Skogskyrkogården Chapel (Karlskoga)
