= Rävåsen =

Neighbourhood of Karlskoga, Sweden

Coordinates: 59°20′00″N 14°30′26″E

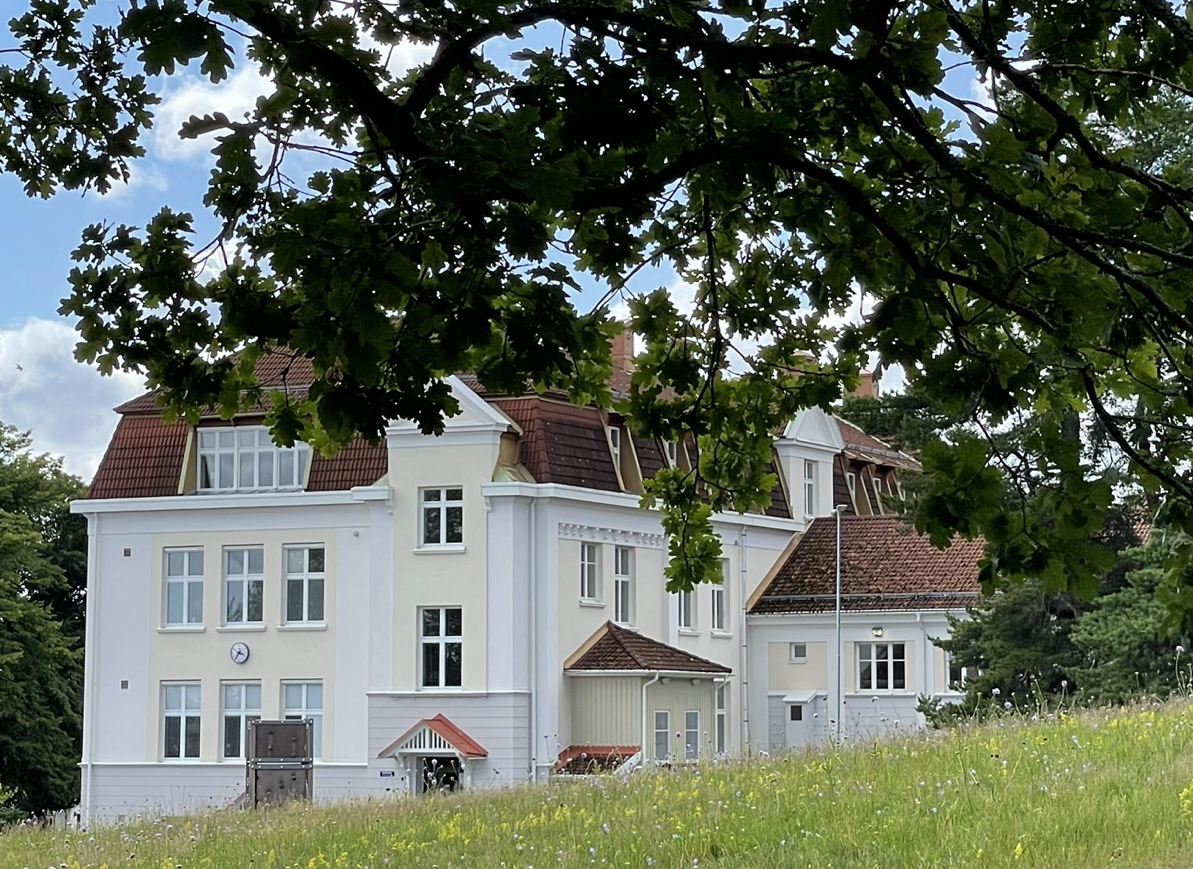
The Rävåsen School

Rävåsen is a neighbourhood of Karlskoga, Sweden.

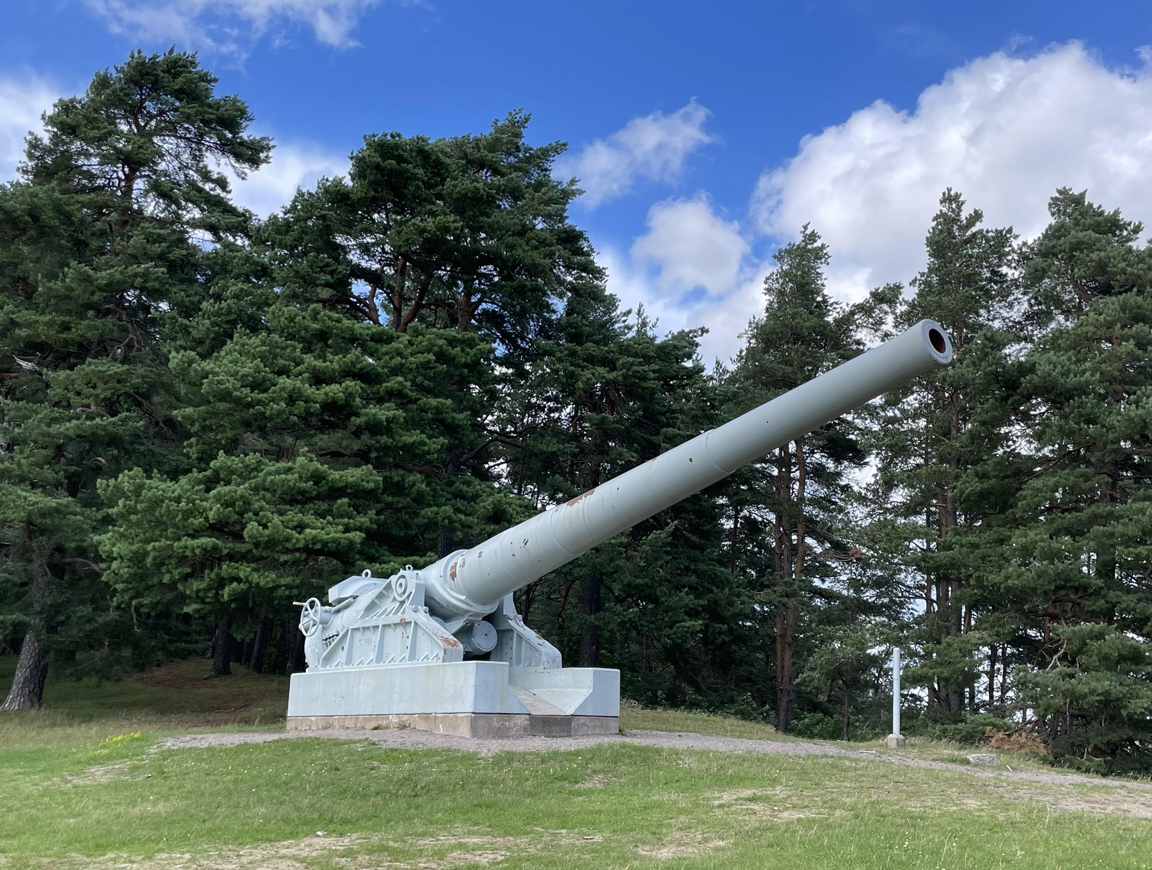
The cannon, of model Bofors 283 mm M/12 naval gun

Rävåskullen is located near the city center and is visible from central parts of Karlskoga. The name Rävåsen is also used by sports clubs that operate in or near the area, such as Rävåsens IK. In the area, there are several hiking trails, as well as a landmark known as the "kanonen på Rävåskullen". The cannon, of the model Bofors 283 mm M/12 naval gun, was manufactured by Bofors and was set up on Rävåskullen during Karlskoga's 400th anniversary celebration in 1986.

== See also ==
- Rävåsen Nature Reserve
