= Bofors Hotel =

- Bofors hotell
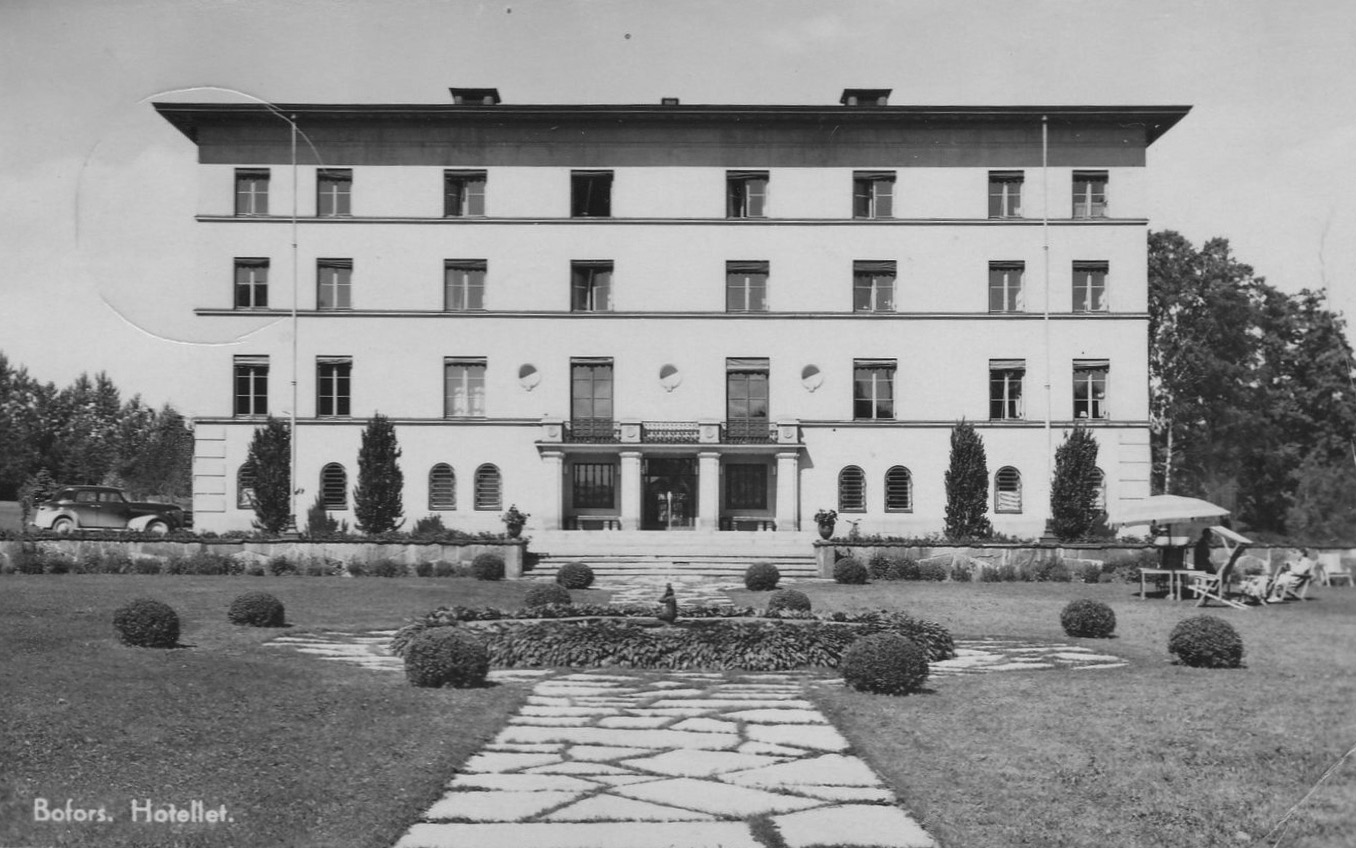
- Interactive map of the Bofors Hotel area

General information
- Status: Completed
- Type: Hotel
- Location: Karlskoga, Sweden
- Coordinates: 59.328558°N 14.542508°E
- Completed: c. 1930

Design and construction
- Architect: Wilhelm von Eick

Other information
- Number of rooms: c. 50

Website
- boforshotell.com

The Bofors Hotel (Swedish: Bofors hotell) is a four-storey hotel located in Karlskoga, Karlskoga Municipality, Sweden.

== History ==
The current-standing hotel was initially intended to exclusively serve the guests of arms manufacturer Bofors. The hotel building is the arms manufacturer's third hotel.

The hotel is built in an Italian-themed manor style and was designed by Wilhelm von Eick, constructed in the 1920s, completed in 1930, and renovated in the 1970s, and in 2007 by Kapitän. Eick customized it for important meetings.

The Bofors Hotel, which remains a popular destination for businesspeople and dignitaries to this day, received its first royal visitor in September 1931 when King Gustav V stayed at the property. Swedish Prime Minister Per Albin Hansson also visited the hotel during the 1930s.

In the years that followed, the hotel continued to host royalty, including the current King, who visited in 1973, King Carl XVI Gustaf, who also came in 1983 accompanied by Queen Silvia of Sweden.

The hotel has played host to many other famous guests over the years. Some notable guests include Prince Bertil.

== See also ==
- Bofors
- Mässen
