= Karlshall =

Courthouse in Karlskoga, Sweden

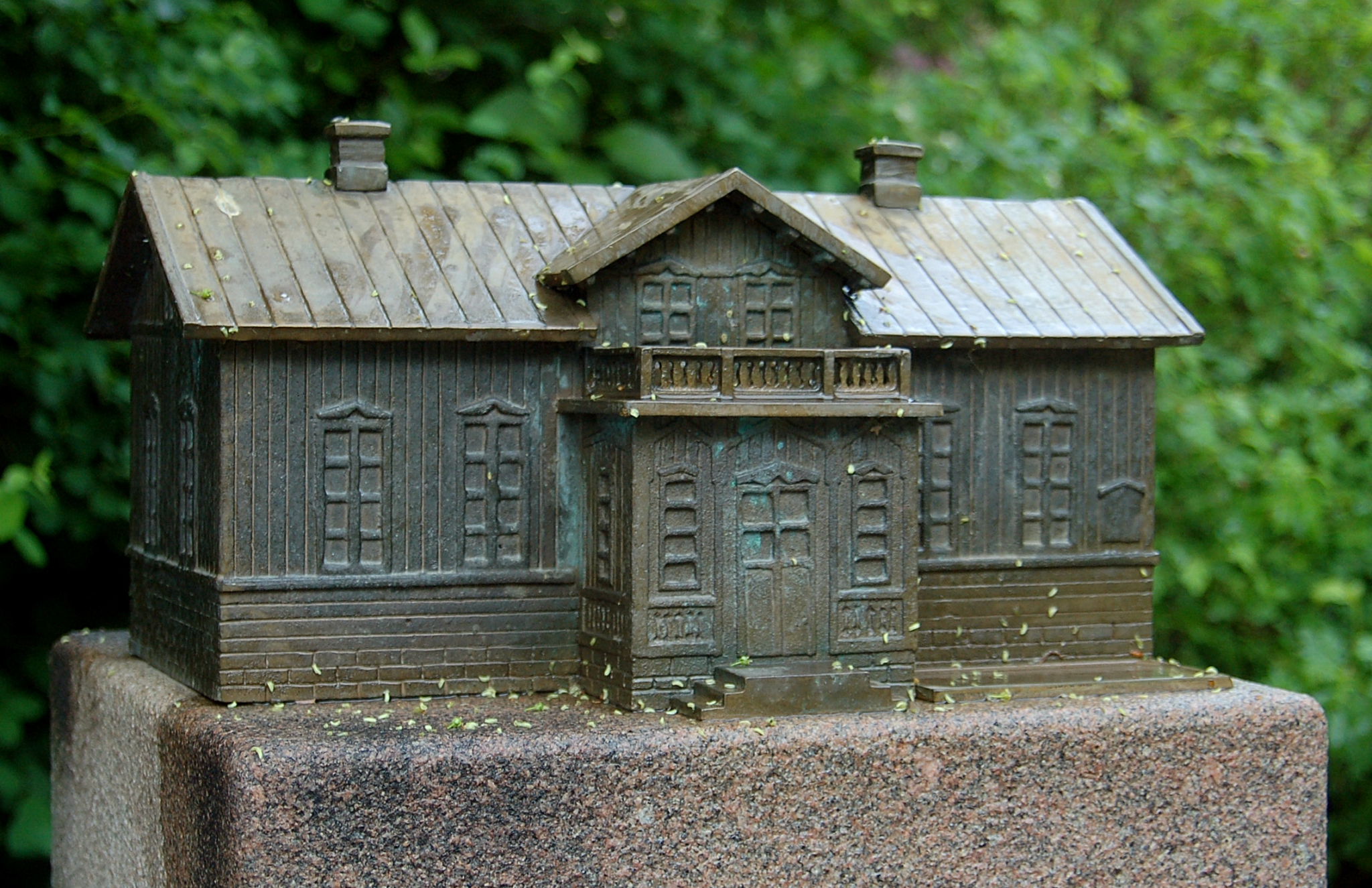
- Sculpture of Karlshall, sculptor Henry Morin
- Interactive map of the Karlshall area
- Alternative names: Tingshuset Karlshall

General information
- Status: Demolished
- Location: Karlskoga, Sweden
- Groundbreaking: 1882
- Completed: 1883
- Renovated: 1905
- Demolished: 1945

Renovating team
- Architect: Magnus Dahlander

Karlshall was a courthouse in Karlskoga, Karlskoga Municipality, Sweden, situated within the city center, bordered by an esker to the north and the south by the Karlskoga Church. The site is of interest to the Nobel Prize because of its role in the process of its creation.

== History ==
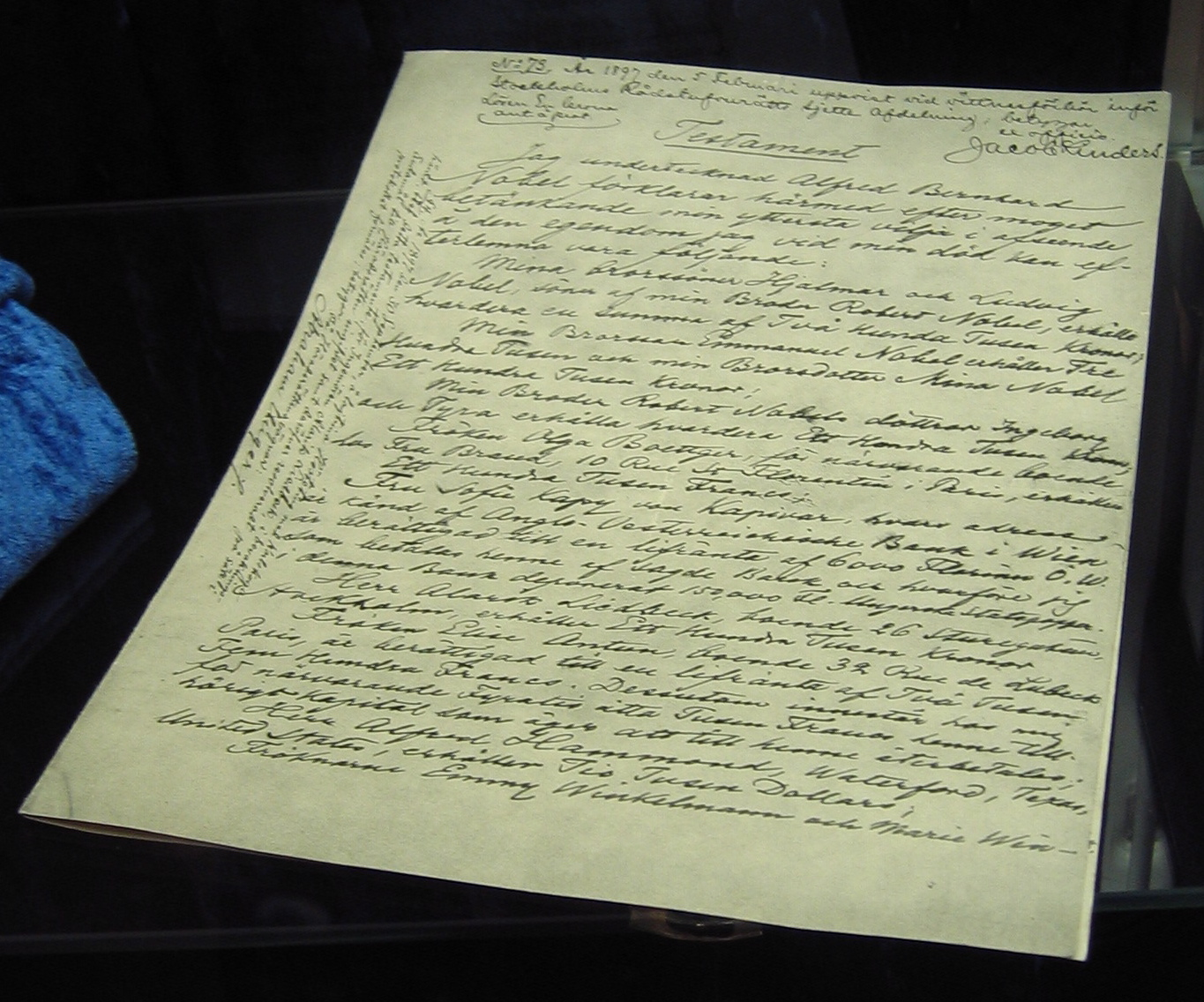
Facsimile of Alfred Nobel's last will, displayed at Björkborn Manor

Karlshall was constructed between 1882 and 1883 and demolished in 1945. It was a wooden white-colored building, with both pinnacles and towers, surrounded by an iron fence. In 1905, architect Magnus Dahlander renovated it. It served as the courthouse of the Karlskoga Bergslag Hundred from 1884 to 1945. The courthouse's detention center has been preserved and is today an art gallery.

On 13 February 1897, the Karlskoga District Court approved Alfred Nobel's last will at Karlshall. Nobel's relatives contested the district court's decision.

Remains of the former building foundation were exposed during the fall of 2022 following the construction of a fountain, which sparked a local debate on how the cultural heritage of Karlshall could be better managed.
