= Rävåsens IK =

Swedish football club

- Full name: Rävåsens idrottsklubb
- Sport: soccer
- Founded: 1941
- Based in: Karlskoga, Sweden

Rävåsens IK is a sports club in Rävåsen in Karlskoga, Sweden, established in 1941.

The women's soccer team played in the Swedish top division in 1978 and 1979.
