= 1985 Karlskoga gas leak =

1985 gas leak in Karlskoga, Sweden

- Date: January 10–11, 1985
- Location: Karlskoga, Sweden; 29°21′46.5″N 34°57′45.5″E
- Deaths: 0
- Injuries: 20

On 10 January 1985, a gas leak occurred at Björkborn, Karlskoga Municipality, Sweden, when a chemical plant spewed sulfuric acid gas over Karlskoga. The incident forced 300 people to evacuate and injured 20 people.

== Accident ==
On Thursday, January 10, 1985, at 7:30 PM local time, a gas leak was detected at the Björkborn Industrial Zone. The site is situated just northeast of Björkborn Manor.

The gas container stopped leaking by 3 AM local time still the gas had reacted with the fog. Thus, resulting in an almost opaque-like fog covering the town of Karlskoga.

== Response ==
Schools and workplaces were closed, requiring all 36,000 inhabitants to remain inside their homes. Traffic on the European Route E18 came to a halt, and daily activities were put on hold, all in response to the gas leak.

In addition, approximately 20 people sought treatment at an emergency clinic set up at a local school, treating chest pains and coughing.

== See also ==
- Bofors
