= Mässen =

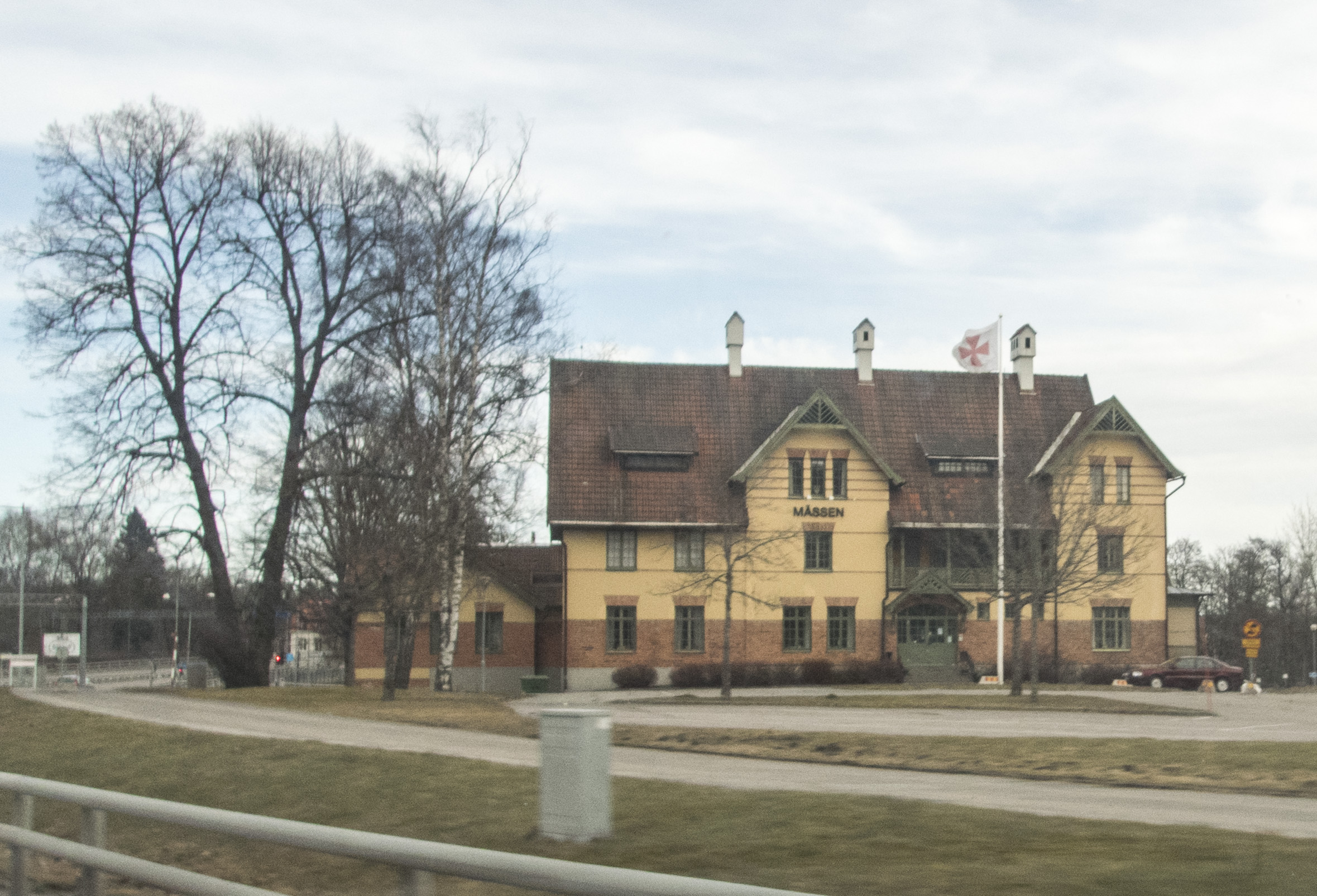
- Mässen, seen from the European route E18
- Interactive map of the Mässen area
- Alternative names: Bofors Mässen

General information
- Status: Completed
- Type: Hotel
- Location: Karlskoga, Sweden
- Coordinates: 59.3300°N 14.5436°E
- Completed: 1906

Design and construction
- Architect: Folke Zettervall

Mässen (Note: The building is often referred to as "Bofors Mässen", and "Boforsmässen".) (Swedish pronunciation: [mæːssˈɛn]) was built as a hotel, but currently operates as a restaurant. It is located by the European route E18, in Karlskoga, Karlskoga Municipality, Sweden.

Mässen was initially intended to exclusively serve the guests of arms manufacturer Bofors. It was built by Per Hultén and designed by Folke Zettervall.

It was constructed in the 1900s, and completed in 1906, and officially opened in 1908. It was replaced by the Bofors Hotel in the 1930s. The building was renovated in the 1980s by interior architect Kristina Winberg.

== See also ==
- Bofors
