= Cambrex Corporation =

American pharmaceutical company

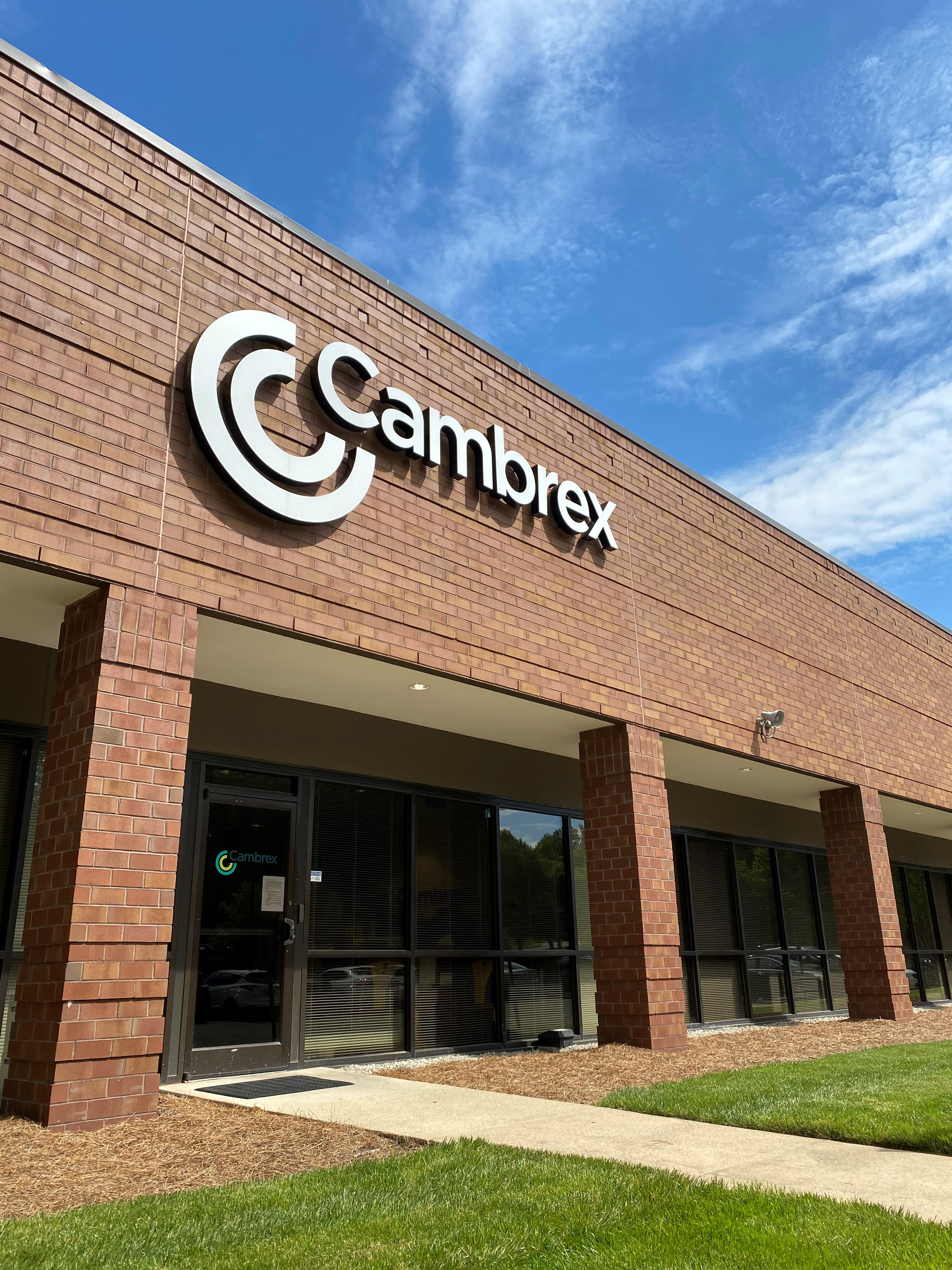
- Type: Private
- Industry: Pharmaceuticals
- Founded: New Jersey (1981)
- Headquarters: East Rutherford, NJ
- Key people: Claudio Russolo, CEO
- Number of employees: 2,000+
- Website: cambrex.com

Cambrex Corporation is a contract manufacturing organization in the pharmaceutical industry.

Cambrex has manufacturing facilities in the US (Agawam, MA; Charles City, IA; Durham, NC; High Point, NC; Longmont, CO; Waltham, MA) and Europe (Edinburgh, UK; Karlskoga, Sweden, Milan, Italy, and R&D centers in Tallinn, Estonia, Wiesbaden, Germany). The headquarters are located in East Rutherford, NJ.

== History ==
Cambrex was founded in 1979, when the Ennis Family acquired the castor oil and derivatives product lines from NL Industries. In 1987, CasChem was renamed Cambrex Corporation and became listed on NASDAQ. In 1990, Cambrex was listed on the NYSE. Cambrex entered the pharmaceutical market in 1994 with the acquisition of Nobel Pharma Chemistry business, now known as Cambrex Karlskoga AB and Cambrex Profarmaco.

Through multiple acquisitions during the late 1990s, the firm entered the bioscience and the chiral enzymatic catalyst markets. Cambrex acquired two contract biopharmaceutical manufacturing facilities in 2001, to bulk manufacture biologics and pharmaceutical ingredients from clinical to commercial scales. In 2007, the firm decided to focus on its core competencies and sold the biologics business to Lonza Group.

In 2008, Prosyntest (now Cambrex Tallinn) was acquired, and Steve Klosk was appointed CEO, while remaining President.

To broaden their biocatalysis platform, Cambrex acquired IEP in 2010, now known as Cambrex IEP.

In 2019, Cambrex acquired Avista Pharma Solutions for $252m to become a fully integrated CDMO. In late 2019, Cambrex was acquired by an affiliate of the Permira funds.

In 2020, Cambrex completed a major expansion at its Edinburgh, UK facility known for solid form screening alongside a biopharmaceutical expansion at its Durham, NC facility. Thomas Loewald was appointed CEO of Cambrex in September 2020.

In 2022, Cambrex acquired Q1 Scientific, based out of Waterford, Ireland.

In 2023, Cambrex acquired the Waltham-headquartered chemical process development services provider, Snapdragon Chemistry.

In 2024, Cambrex expanded Q1 Scientific with new state-of-the-art, temperature-controlled and monitored, stability storage facility in Durham, North Carolina.

In 2025, Cambrex sold its large-scale drug product business unit to Noramco, including its two sites in Whippany, NJ and Mirabel, Quebec.
