= Skranta =

Coordinates: 59°19′14″N 14°30′30″E

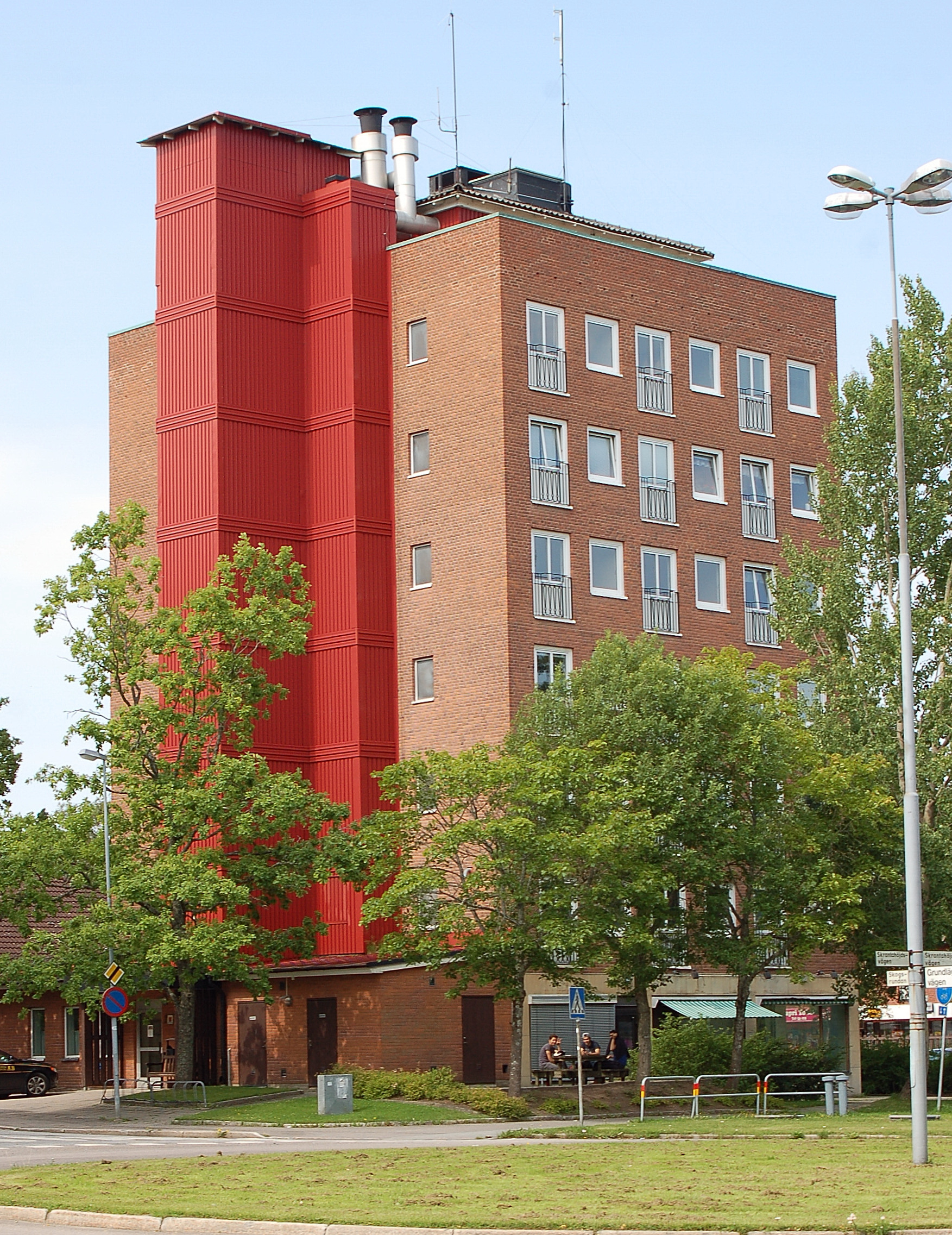
- Residential building in Skranta

- Location within Örebro Location within Sweden
- Country: Sweden
- Province: Värmland
- County: Örebro County
- Municipality: Karlskoga Municipality
- Time zone: UTC+1 (CET)
  - Summer (DST): UTC+2 (CEST)

Skranta is a district in Karlskoga, Sweden. The area was largely developed in the mid-1900s, with the building of a number of apartment blocks.

== Toponomy ==
The name Skranta translates approximately to 'meager grass'.

== History ==
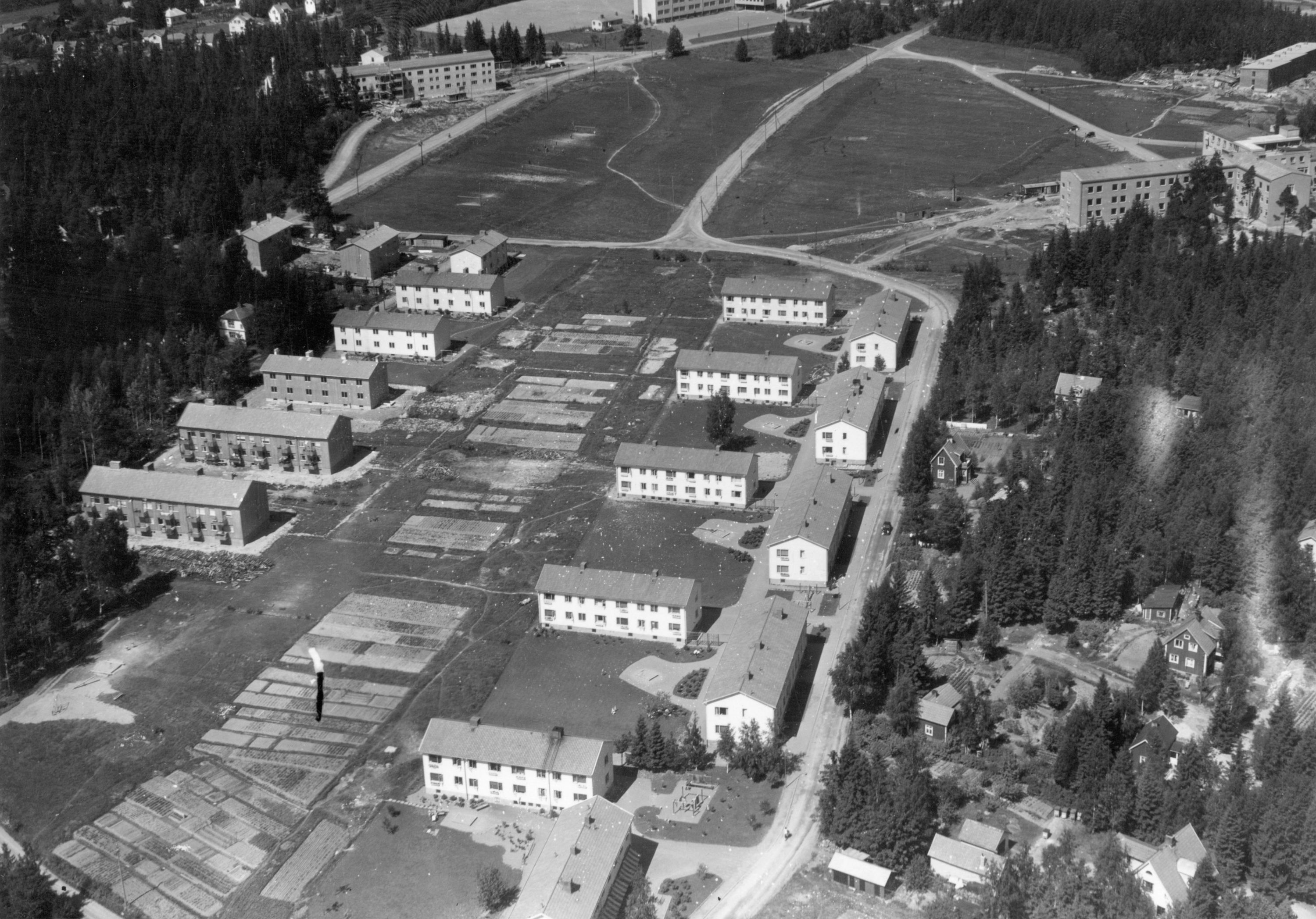
Aerial photograph of the Skranta area, seen from the south

In the 1900s the shopping centre Skrantahöjdstorget was built, consisting of small number of shops, along with a small supermarket, and a hair salon. The area is largely residential, though broken up by green spaces and offices. Previously, there was an elementary and middle school in Skranta, but today there is only a high school.

In 1945, several areas were purchased in Karlskoga, including Skranta, intended for residential development.

== In popular culture ==
Mia Skäringer's character "Tabita on Skrantabacken", portrayed a humorous stereotype of a suburban mom in Skranta.

In 2016, a Skranta documentary series called "Skolpojkarna" (lit. 'The School Boys') was aired on SVT1 and UR Play. The series aimed to highlight the reasons why boys performed worse than girls in school.

== Literature ==
- Bohl, Thore (2015). Skranta- och Landaområdet under åren 1930 -40 -50 (in Swedish).
- Eklund, Sif (2015). Skranta- och Landaområdet. Inledning (in Swedish).
- Kihlén, Stig (2015). Skranta och Skrantafallet under 1930-, 40- och 50-talen (in Swedish).
