= Maja Ekelöf =

Swedish writer (1918–1989)

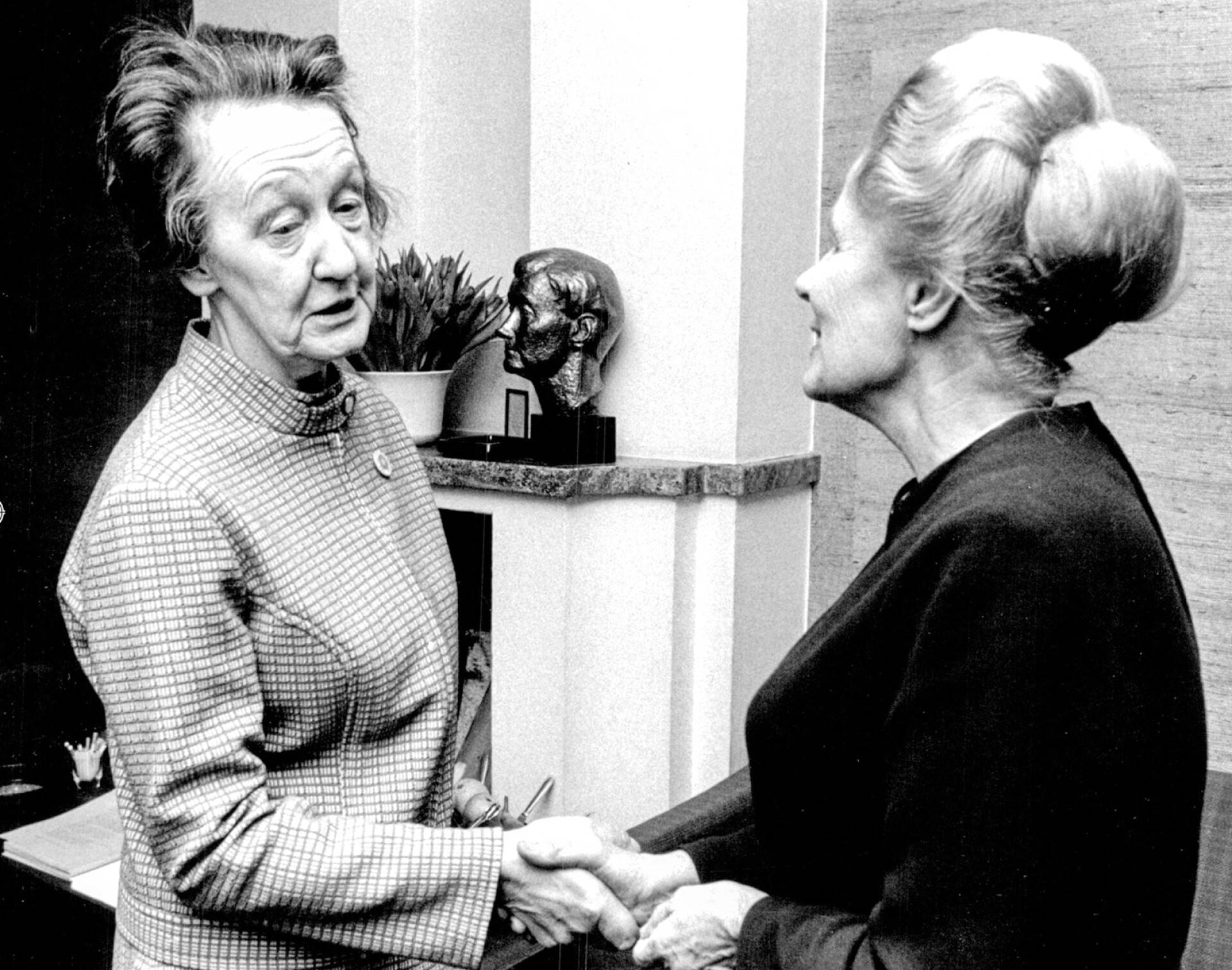
- Maja Ekelöf and Alva Myrdal
- Born: Maja Andersson; 23 February 1918; Karlskoga, Sweden
- Died: 29 August 1989 (aged 71); Karlskoga, Sweden
- Occupation: writer

Maja Ekelöf (23 February 1918 – 29 August 1989) was a Swedish writer.

== Life ==
Ekelöf was a native of Karlskoga, Sweden, and worked as a cleaner. She depicted her work life in her published works.

Ekelöf's "Report from a Scouring-Pale" (Swedish: Rapport från en skurhink), published in 1970, is one of the most renowned works in the working-class genre.

During the 1970s, she was voted the 2nd most popular woman in Sweden by the Swedish magazine Femina.

After Ekelöf, a square was named in 2019, Maja Ekelöf's Square, in Karlskoga.
