= Rävåsen Nature Reserve =

Nature reserve in Örebro, Sweden

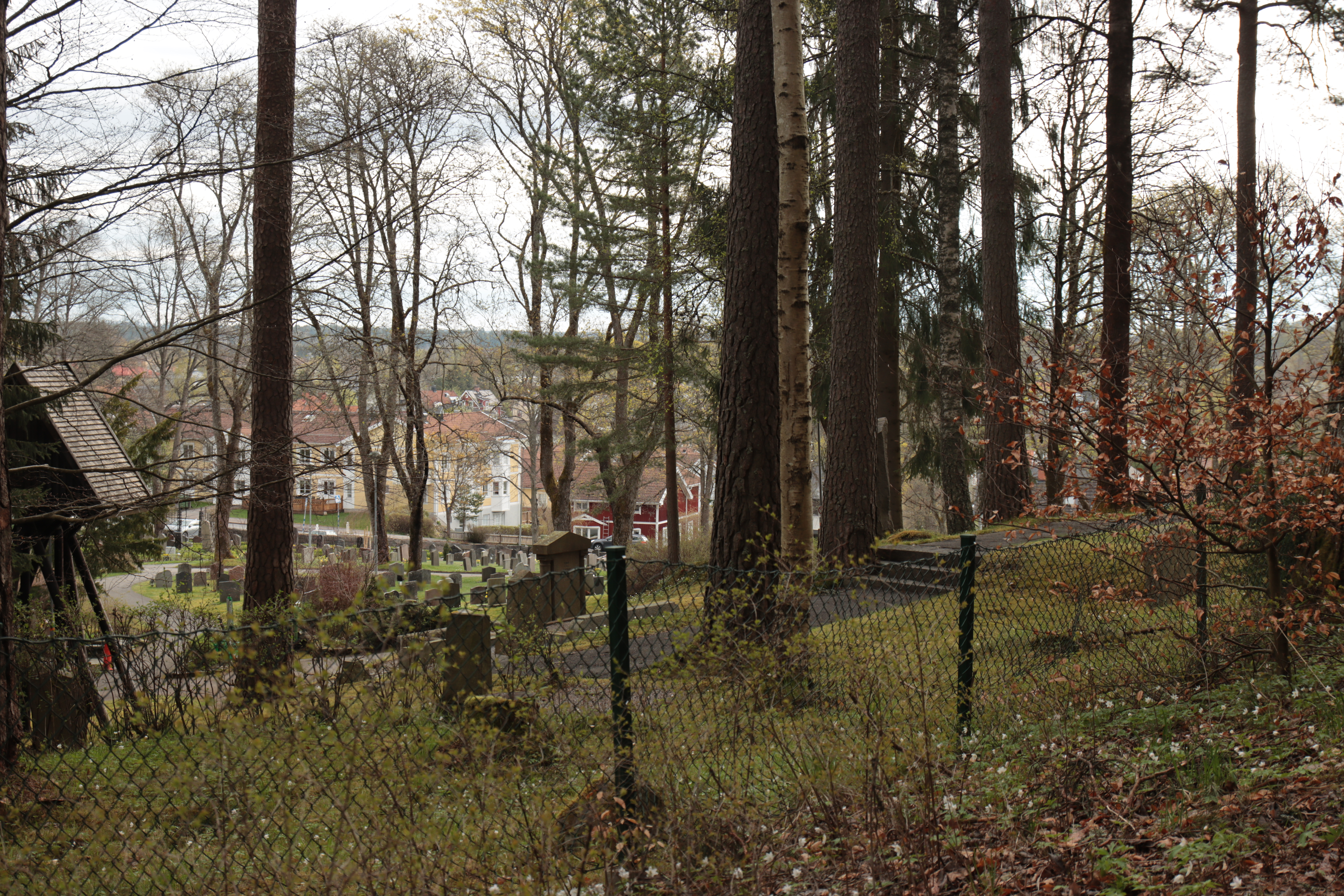
- Rävåsen overlooking the Skogskyrkogården Cemetery
- Interactive map of Rävåsen Nature Reserve
- Location: Rävåsen, Sweden
- Nearest city: Karlskoga
- Established: 26 September 2004

Rävåsen Nature Reserve (Swedish: Rävåsens naturreservat) is a nature reserve in Örebro County in Sweden.

== History ==
In 2002, a decision was made to designate Rävåsen as a nature reserve. Situated in close proximity to Karlskoga, the reserve is enveloped by the town in all directions. Within the Karlskoga Municipality, Rävåsen is one of the six designated nature reserves.

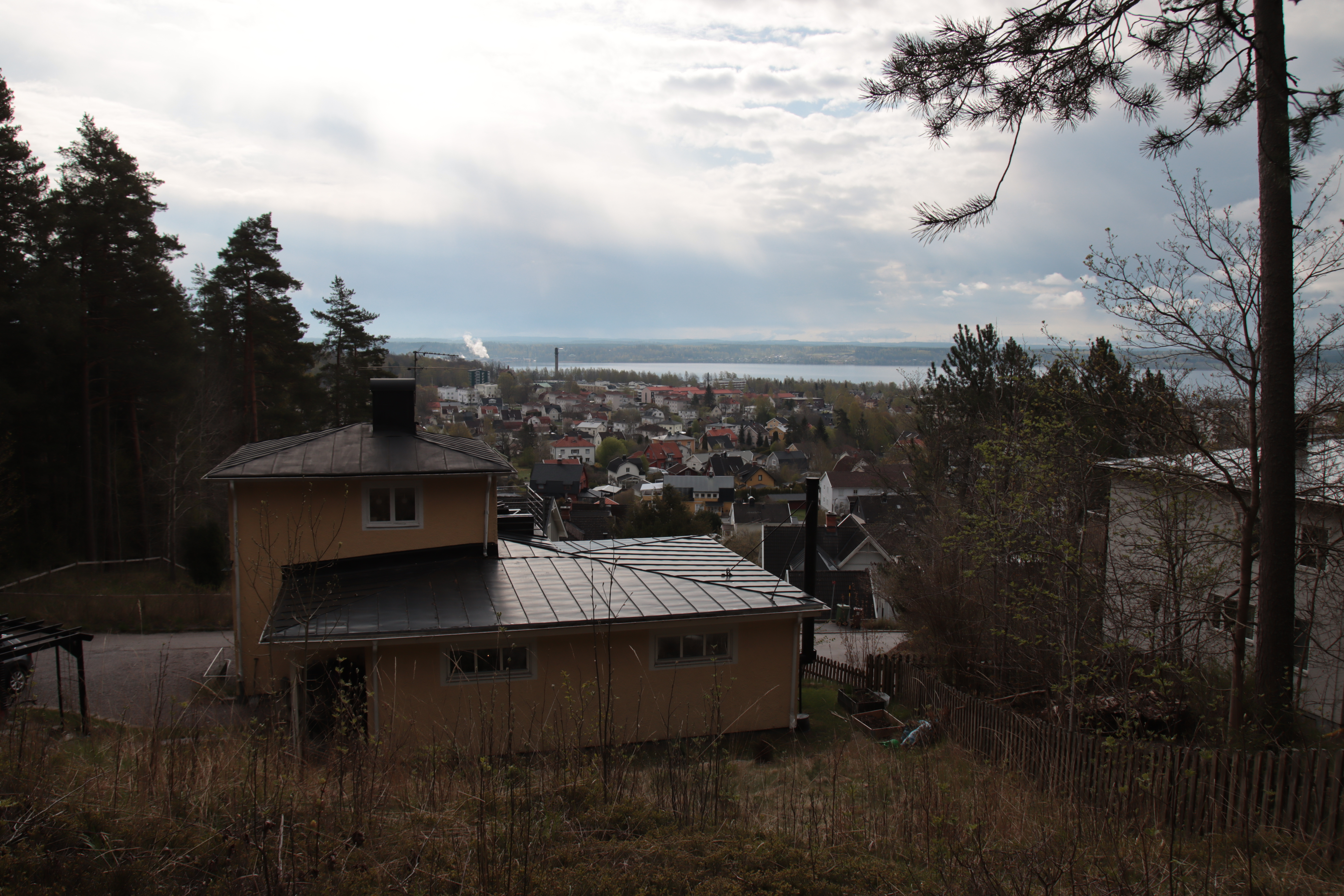
View of central Karlskoga, seen from Rävåsen
