= Wilhelm T. Unge =

Baron Wilhelm Theodor Unge
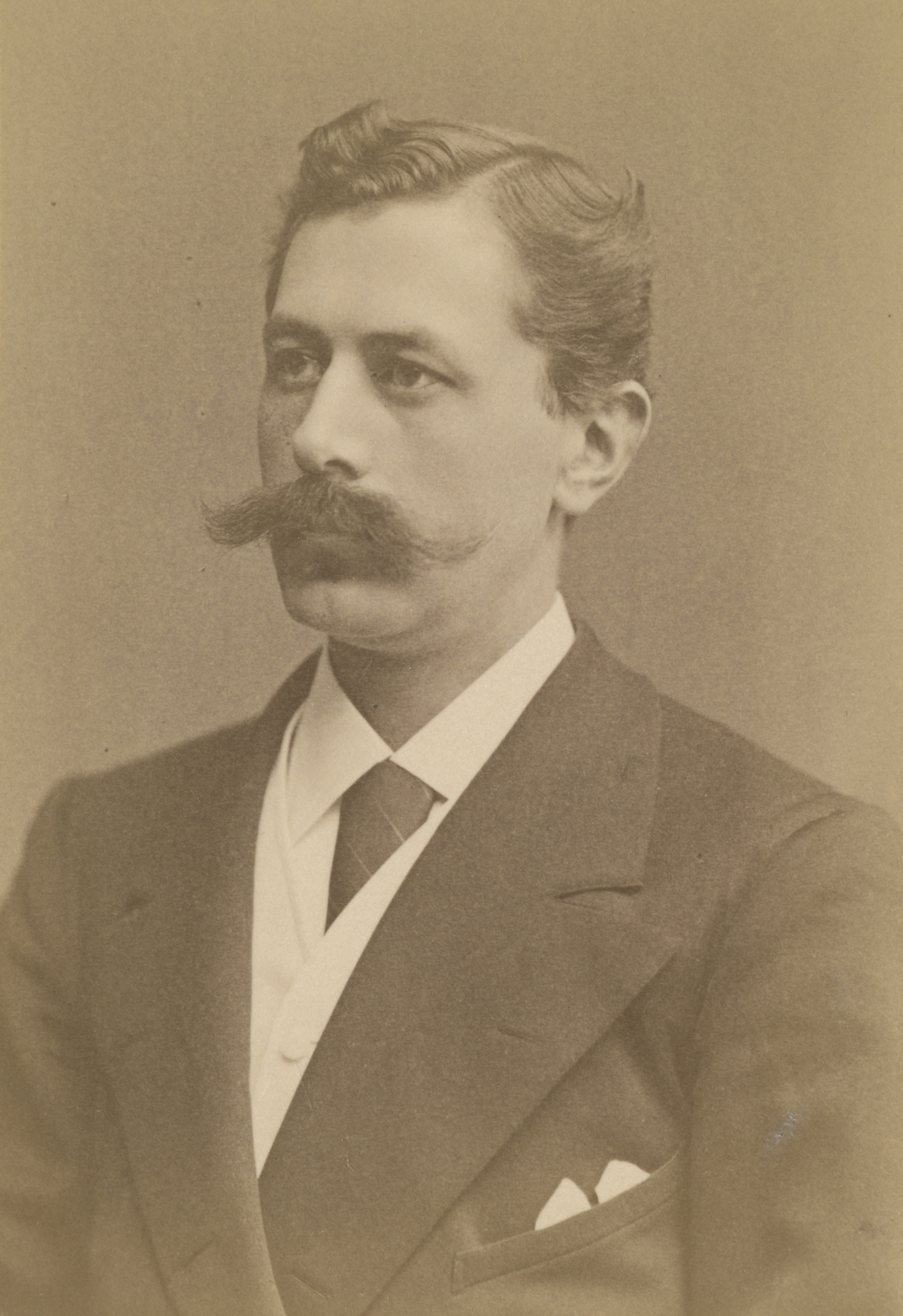
- Born: 1845; Stockholm
- Died: 1915 (aged 69–70)
- Allegiance: Sweden
- Branch: Army of Sweden
- Service years: 1866-? (prior to 1894)
- Rank: Lieutenant colonel, staff-general and captain in the Royal Uplands Regiment
- Other work: controlled, Solid-fuel rocketry; improved propellant; life-saving rockets

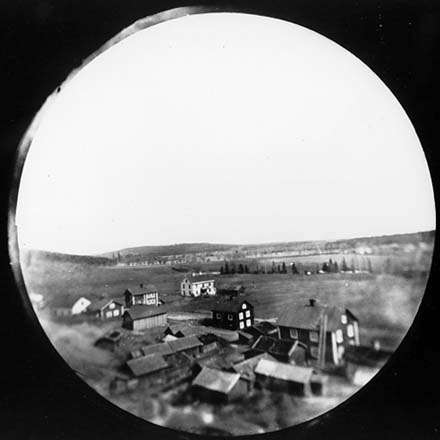
This aerial photograph of Karlskoga possibly used one of Captain W.T. Unge's rockets to carry one of Alfred Nobel cameras c. 1897.

Baron Wilhelm Theodor Unge was a military engineer who invented a telemeter and various improvements to artillery. He was born in Stockholm, Sweden, in 1845. He worked with Alfred Nobel to improve the range and accuracy of Hale rockets, by using improved propellants and launching from cannons. It is possible that one of his rockets carried the Nobel camera that made the first aerial photograph from a rocket in April 1897.

After Nobel died in 1896, Unge obtained patents for improved rockets, with some sold to several countries. In 1908 he sold his patents to Friedrich Krupp.

In 1977, Unge was inducted into the International Space Hall of Fame.

== See also ==
- Hale rockets
- Aerial photography
- Aerial reconnaissance
