= Sigrid Ekehielm =

Sigrid Ekehielm, also known as Boås-Beata, was a Swedish 17th-century business owner.

== Life and work ==
Sigrid Ekehielm was born in the 1640s, to Bengt Ekehielm and Eva Eggertz. Ekehielm was married three times. Her first marriage was in 1669 to Christian Stiernflycht, her second marriage was in 1671 to Crispin Flygge, and her third marriage was in 1675 to Marcus Cronström.

She owned several ironworks, including Bofors in Karlskoga.

Ekehielm died in 1700, in Varnum.
