= Skogskyrkogården Chapel (Karlskoga) =

Christian place of prayer and worship

- Skogskyrkogårdens kapell
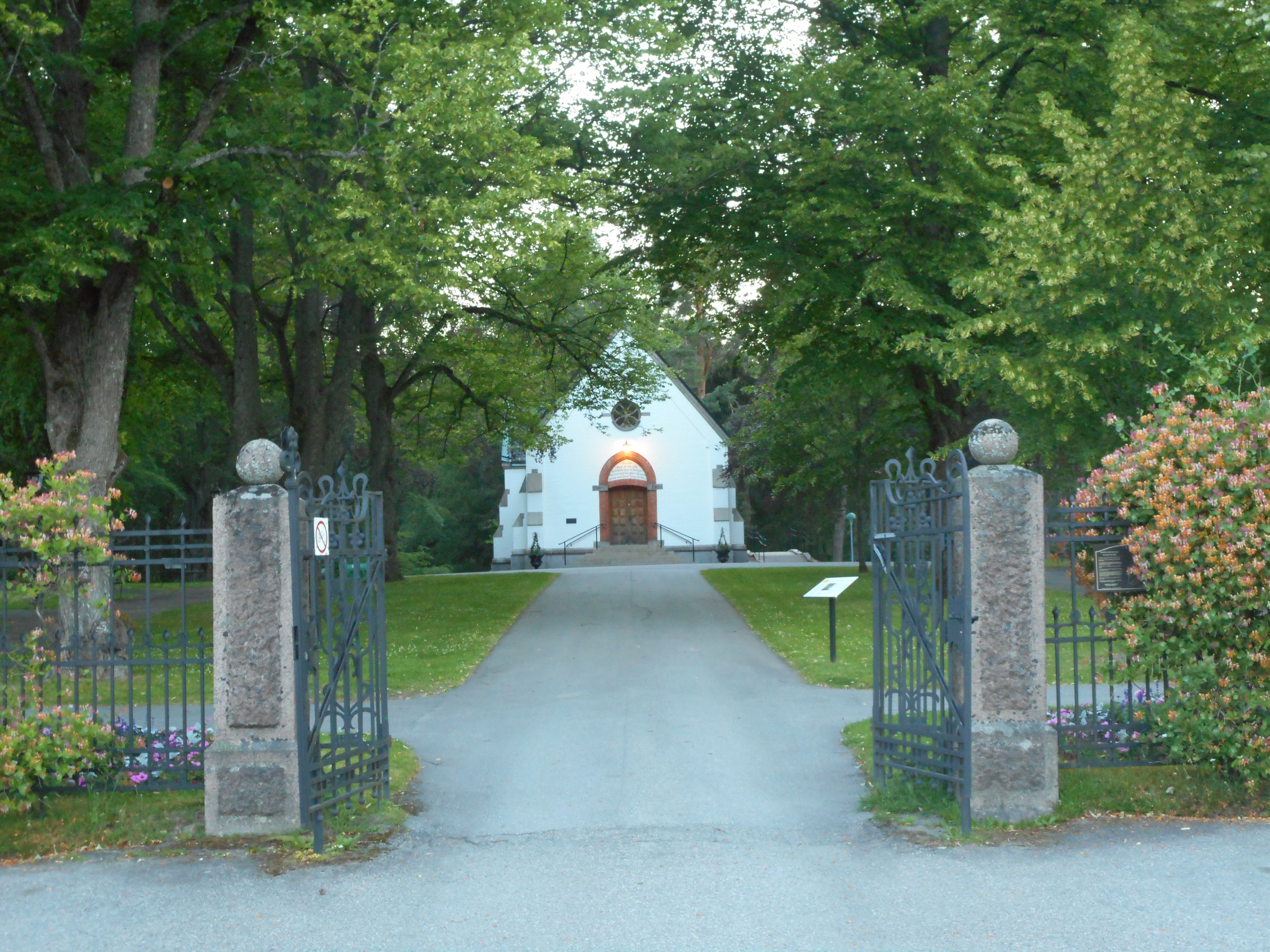
- Skogskyrkogården Chapel in 2015
- Skogskyrkogården Chapel
- Location: Karlskoga Municipality
- Address: Badstugatan
- Country: Sweden
- Denomination: Church of Sweden

Architecture
- Architect: Lars Bäckvall
- Completed: 1908

Specifications
- Capacity: 50

Administration
- Diocese: Diocese of Karlstad

Skogskyrkogården Chapel (Swedish for 'The Woodland Cemetery Chapel'; pronounced [ˈskûːɡsɕʏrkʊˌɡoːɖɛn]) is a chapel in Karlskoga Municipality in Sweden. It is bordered by an esker to the west and by the Karlskoga city center to the south and east.

== History ==
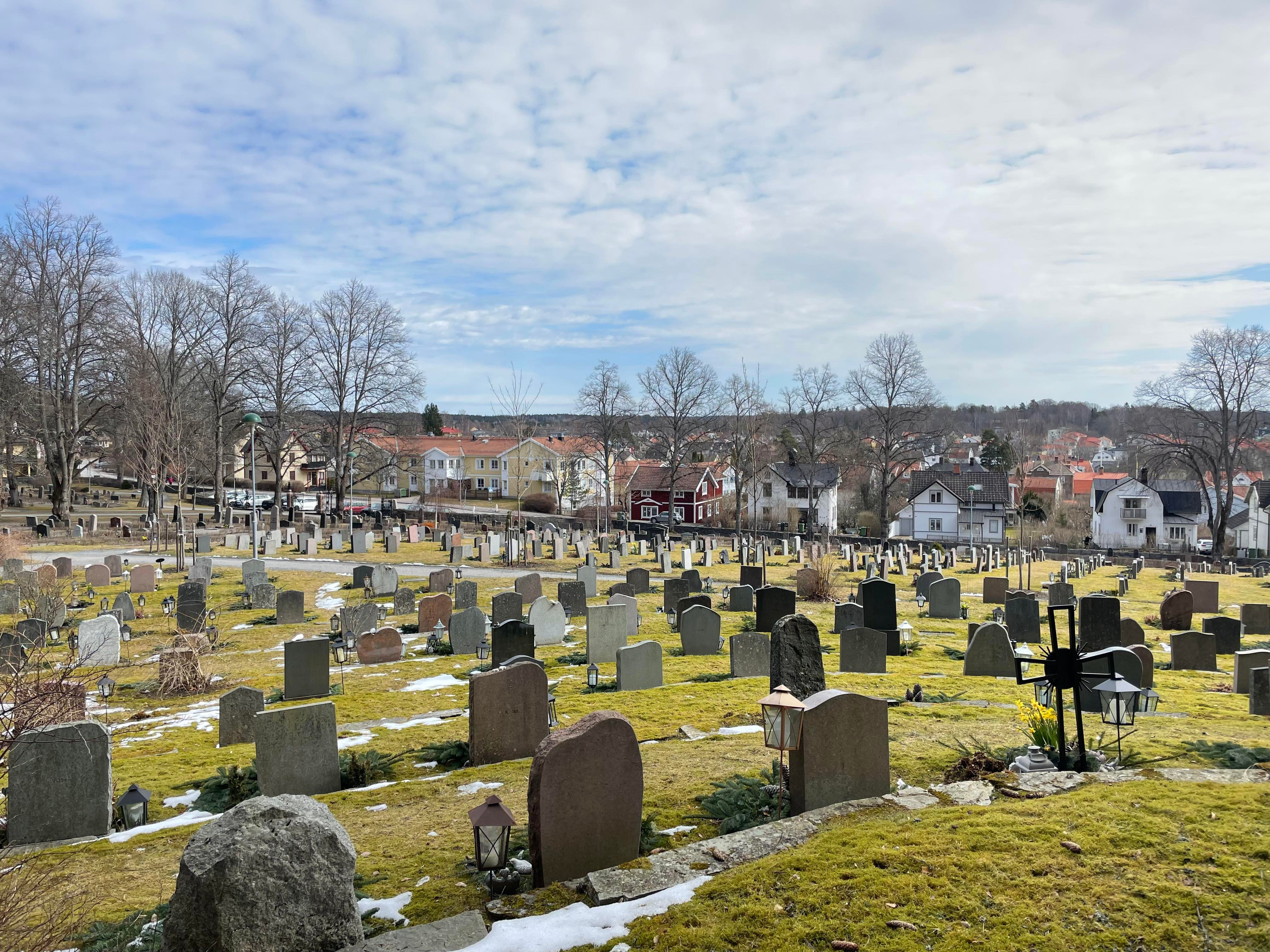
The Skogskyrkogården Cemetery in 2023

The chapel building was designed by Lars Bäckvall and completed in 1908. It is heritage listed by the Swedish National Heritage Board.

The cemetery is one of the oldest woodland cemeteries in Sweden. It was inaugurated in 1908, and the proposal for the new cemetery was developed by horticulturist O.F. Holmsten. The inauguration was officiated by Bishop J.A. Eklund. However, the first burial did not take place until 1911.
