= Karlskoga =

- Locality
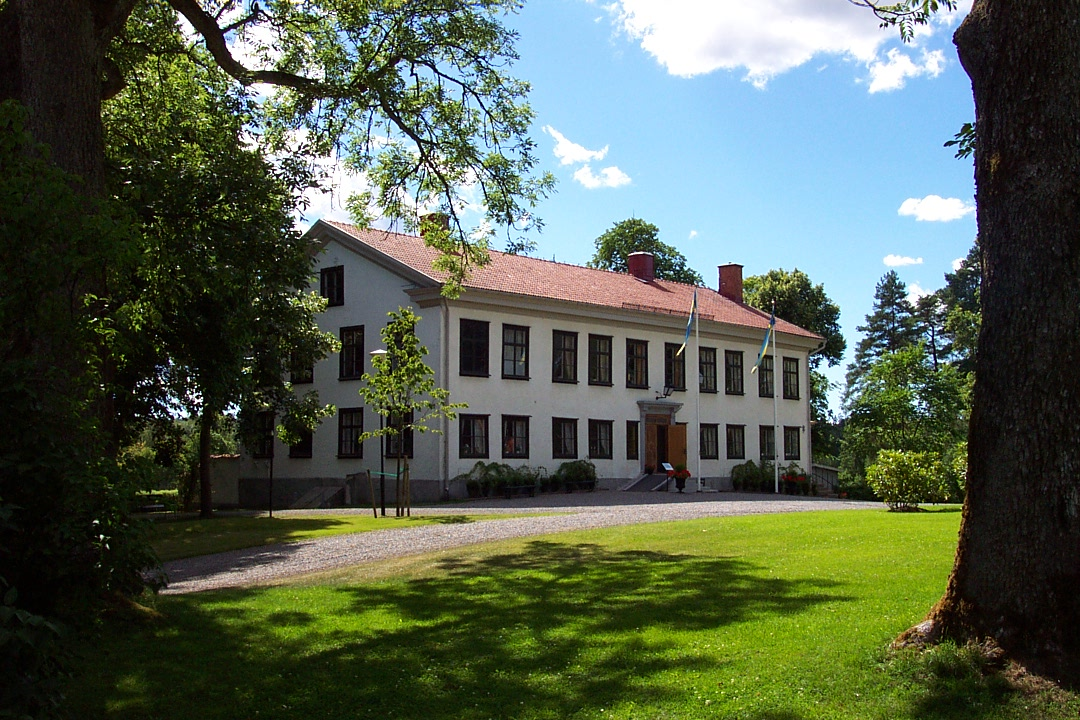
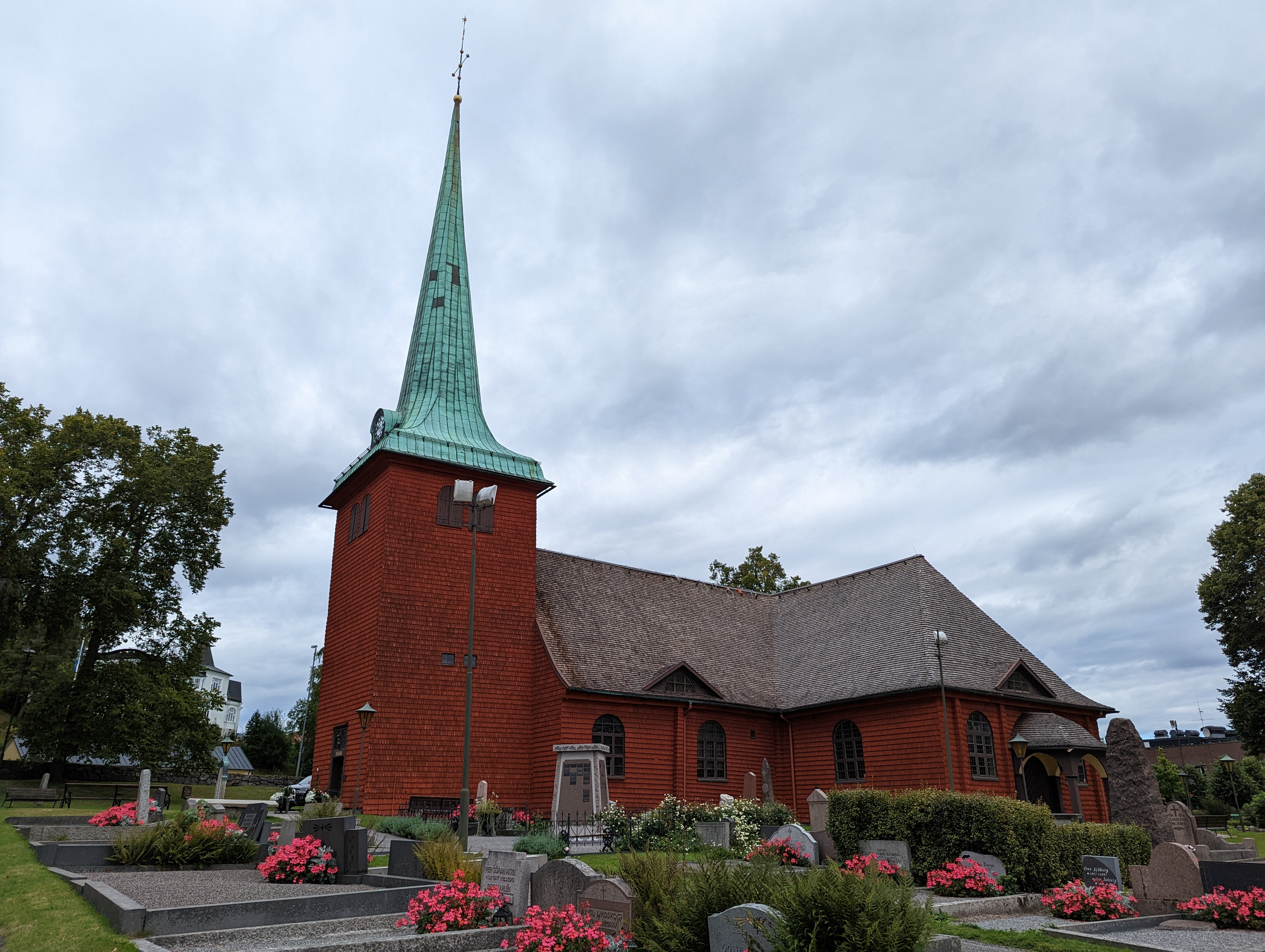
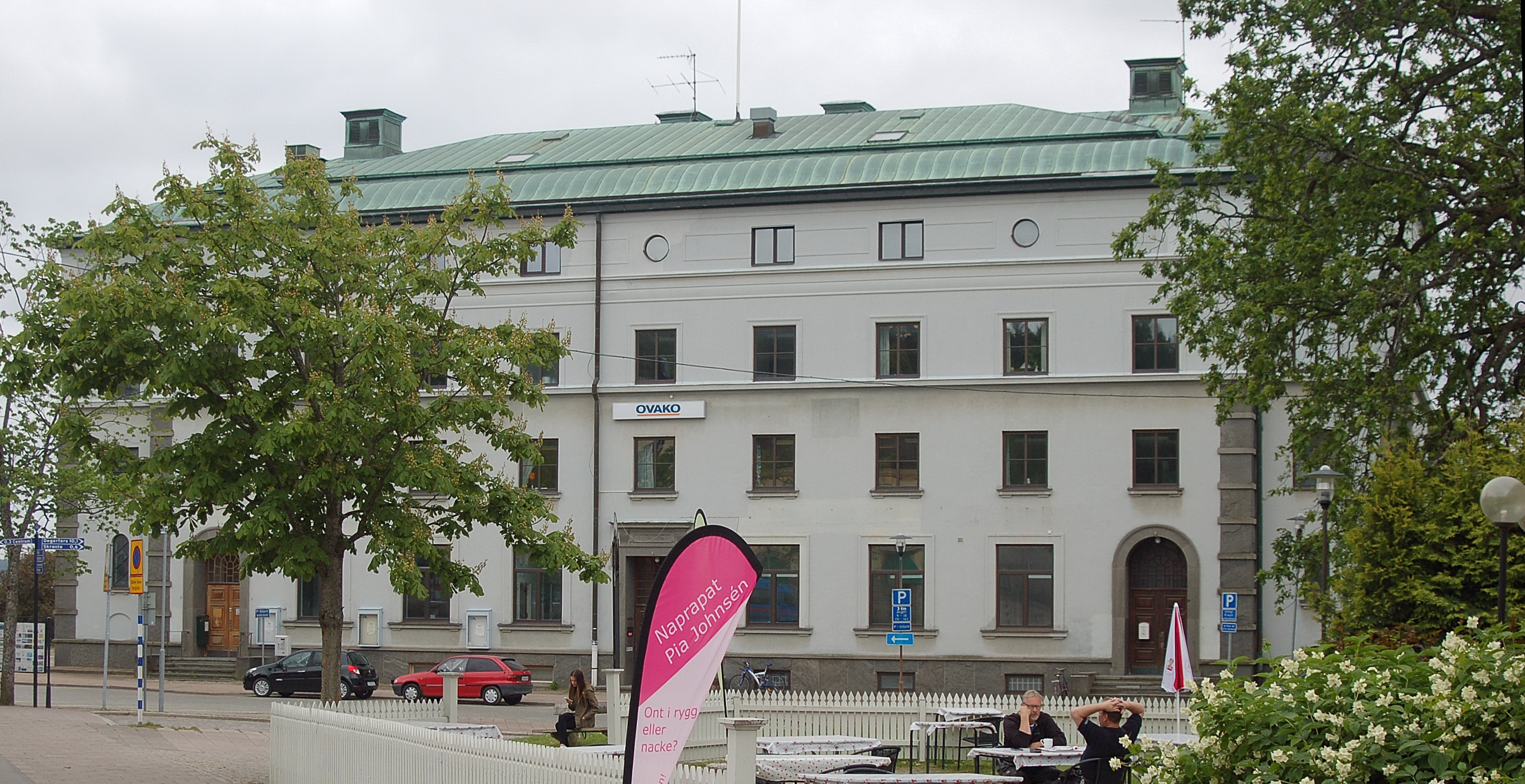
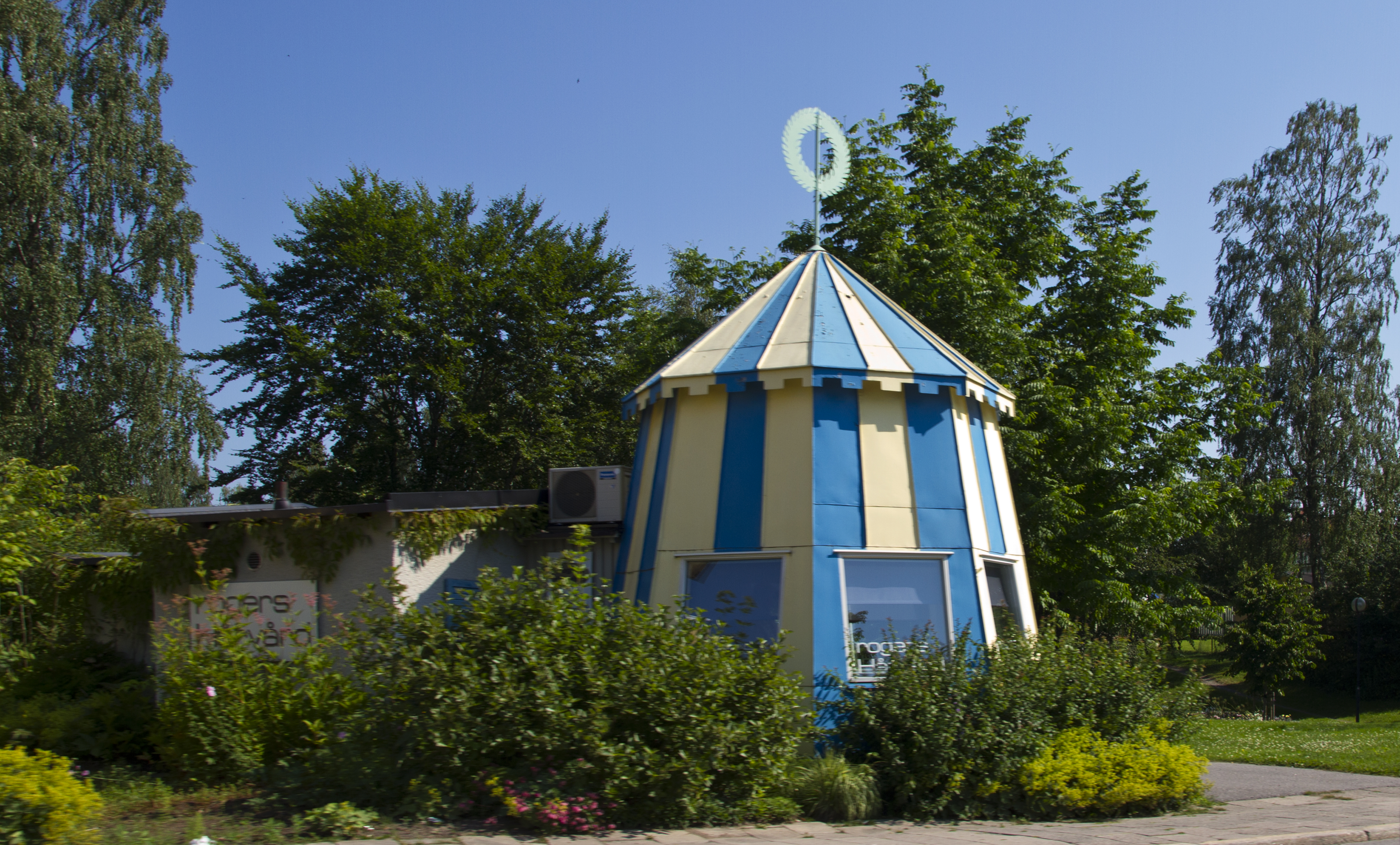
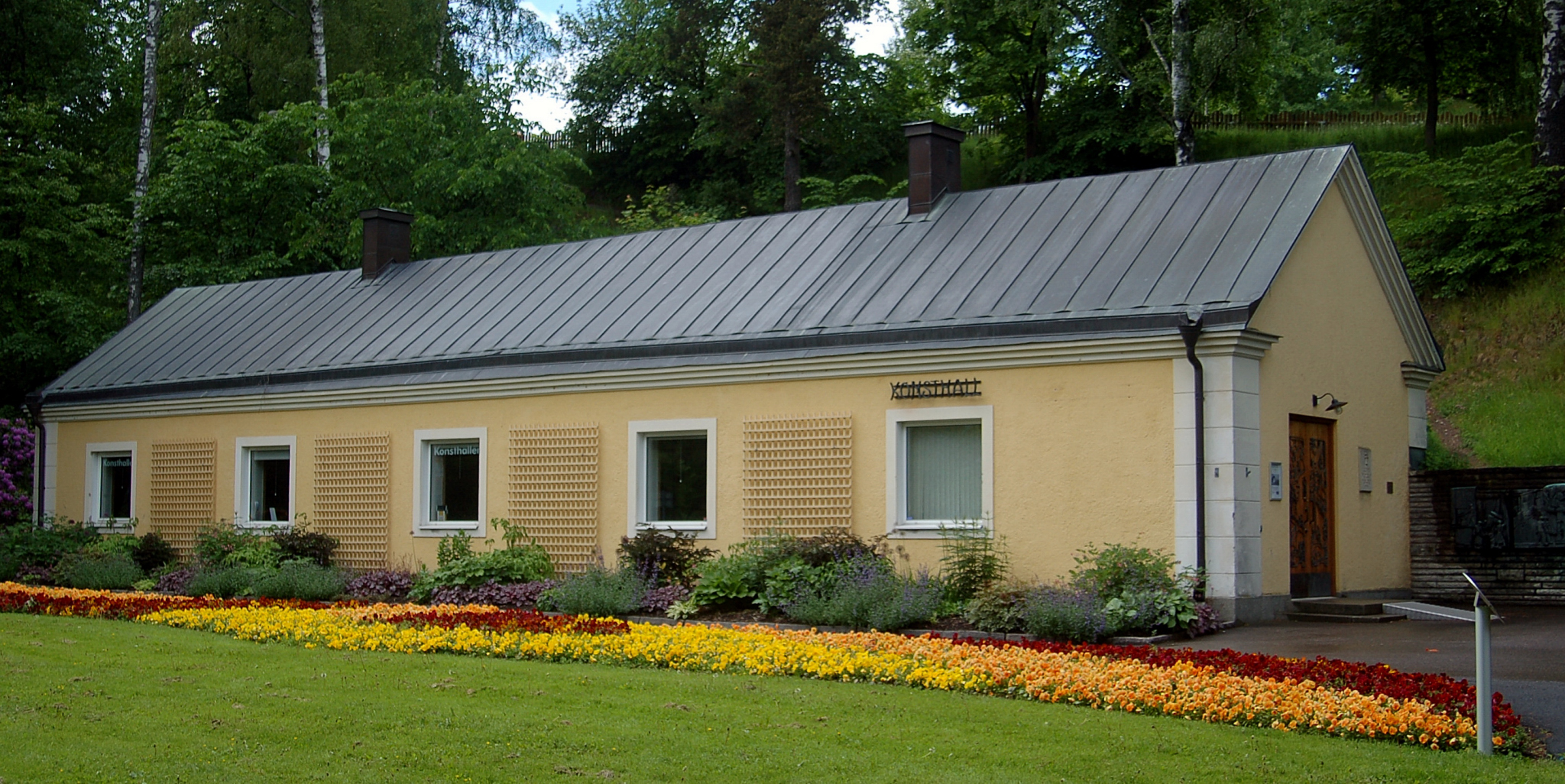
- Björkborn Manor Karlskoga Church Karlskoga Hundred Savings Bank Circus Kiosk Karlskoga Art Gallery
- Nickname: Alfred Nobel's Karlskoga
- Location within Örebro Location within Sweden
- Coordinates: 59°20′N 14°31′E
- Country: Sweden
- Province: Värmland
- County: Örebro County
- Municipality: Karlskoga Municipality
- Named for: Charles IX of Sweden

Government
  - Chairman of the municipal board: Tony Ring (M)

Area
  - Total: 27.33 km^{2} (10.55 sq mi)

Population (2018)
  - Total: 27,562
  - Density: 991/km^{2} (2,570/sq mi)
- Time zone: UTC+1 (CET)
  - Summer (DST): UTC+2 (CEST)
- Website: http://www.karlskoga.se

Karlskoga (Swedish pronunciation: [kaɭˈskûːɡa]) is a locality and the seat of Karlskoga Municipality, Sweden. It is located within Örebro County, 45 km (28 mi) west of Örebro, and 10 km (6 mi) north of Degerfors. With a 2020 population of 27,386 distributed over 10.55 square miles (27.33 km^{2}), Karlskoga is the second-largest city in both Örebro County and the historical province of Värmland.

Karlskoga straddles the northern shore of Lake Möckeln. Among the city's main topographical features are the two rivers, Timsälven and Svartälven. Other features include an esker, Rävåsen, designated as a nature reserve, and contiguous with the city center.

The broader Karlskoga area distinguishes itself from its surrounding regions, e.g. the Närke Plain, with its abundant woodlands and hills, which made it better suited for activities beyond agriculture, such as the ironwork industry.

Karlskoga evolved around the arms manufacturer Bofors, and by 1970, it counted almost 10,000 employees. The many jobs in the arms industry during the 1900s multiplied Karlskoga's population. Today, Karlskoga is still a thriving center of the arms industry, but its economy is more diverse than during the peak-Bofors era.

Karlskoga is home to the Björkborn Manor, on the property of the Björkborn Works, where Alfred Nobel lived. His residency there is the reason his will was adjudicated in Karlskoga at Karlshall, establishing the Nobel Prize. Other landmarks include the Nobel Laboratory, the Karlskoga Church, Mässen, and the Bofors Hotel.

== Etymology ==
Karlskoga was initially called Möckelns bodar, Möckelsboderna or Bodarna, being derived from cottages located at the shore of lake Möckeln.

The locality's name "Karlskoga" was coined in 1591, and has been in use ever since. It is derived from Charles (Karl) IX, with skog meaning woods.

== History ==
=== 16th century ===
Karlskoga and its surrounding area were sparsely populated in the beginning of the 16th century. It was not until the 1580s that the area started to see an increase in population, when Charles IX made people settle in the area. Ethnic Swedes (people from the historical provinces of Närke and Södermanland), and particularly Finns, (Note: Also referred to as Forest Finns, as per the ethnic group settling the forest areas of Sweden proper during late 16th and early-to-mid-17th centuries.) began to settle the area, where they took up the farming method slash-and-burn. They were followed by Huguenots, fleeing religious oppression in France, and by other groups including both Dutch and German settlers, mostly skilled metalsmiths.

The parish of Karlskoga was established in 1586 and a wooden church was soon built. It was small in size, and was solely made up of the sacristy still preserved at this site, which was a consequence of population increase in the years prior. The first priest elected was Olaus Gestricius (herr Olaf på Möckelnsbodar) by the late 1500s.

=== Industrial era ===
During the 17th century, fourteen small ironworks and eight water-driven hammers for producing bar iron were established. This encompassed the emergence of both Björkborn Works and Bofors Works. As the owner of both ironworks, Sigrid Ekehielm assumed the leadership of an industrial empire.

Most of the original ironworks were still operating in the 1860s, but the dominating ironworks was the one in nearby Bofors. In 1871, Bofors produced 6,124 metric tons of iron, more than any other plant in Sweden. In 1882, Karlskoga Parish (socken) had 11,184 inhabitants.

The town of Karlskoga has evolved around Bofors, which in the late 19th century was transformed from an iron works to a manufacturer of cannon and in the 20th century to a more diversified defense industry. Bofors was incorporated in 1873 and has since the 1880s been specializing in the lucrative manufacture of cannon.

=== Alfred Nobel ===
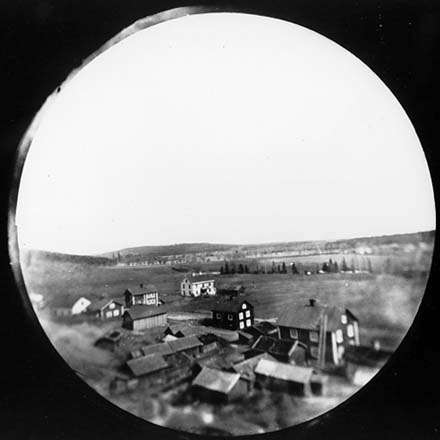
The first aerial photograph by rocket was of Karlskoga using one of Alfred Nobel cameras c. 1897, rocket possibly by Captain Wilhelm T. Unge

The most famous owner of Bofors was Alfred Nobel, who owned the company from 1894 until his death in December 1896.

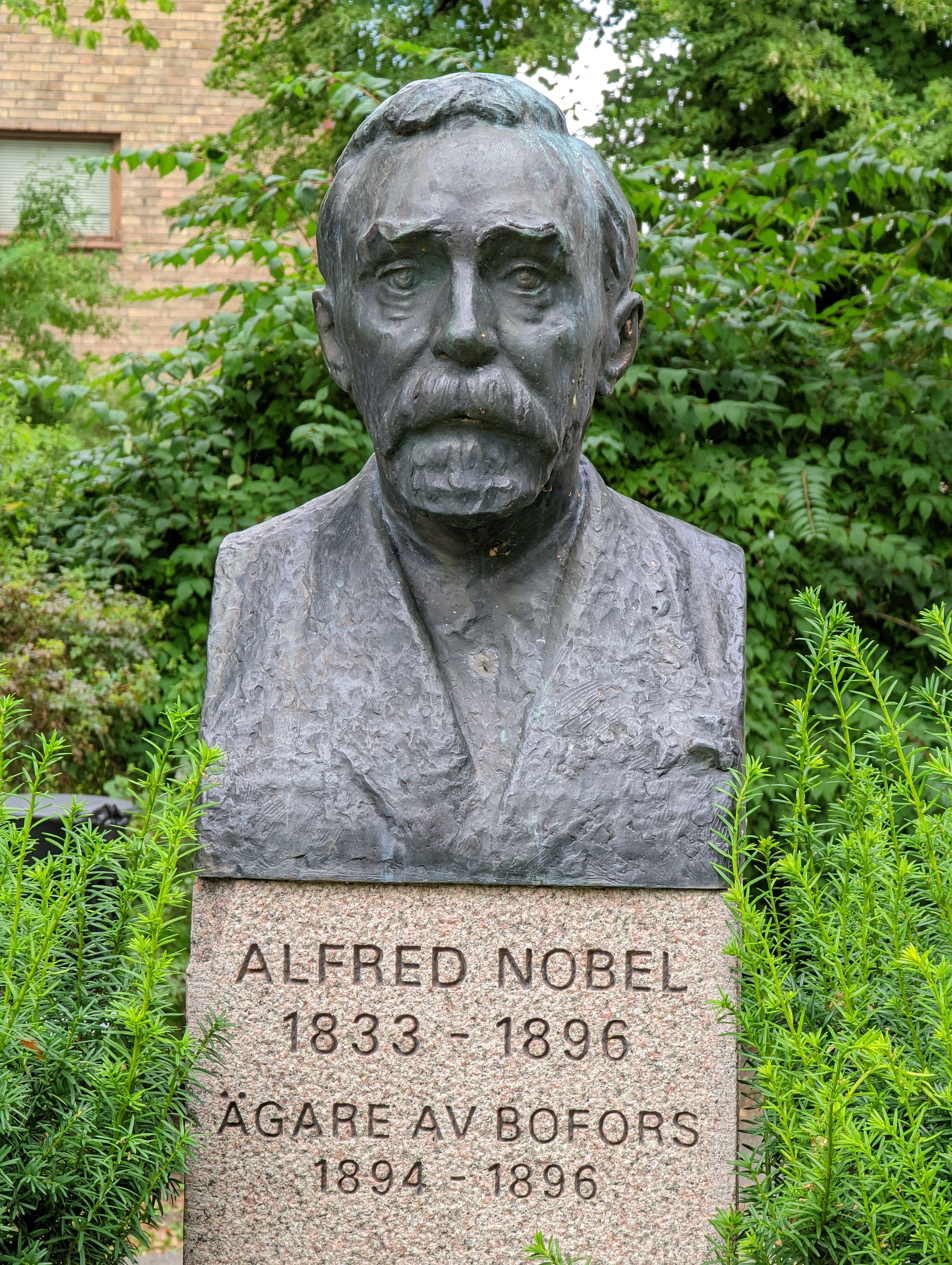
Alfred Nobel

Nobel had a key role in reshaping the ironworks to a modern cannon manufacturer and chemical industry. During the summers of 1894–1896 he lived in the manor house Björkborn.

Even though he died in his villa in Sanremo, Italy and had a home in Paris, it was decided that his legal residence was at Björkborn in Karlskoga, which had been his final residence in Sweden. Because of that it was here his famous testament that was written in Paris in 1895 was legally registered, which eventually made it possible to establish the Nobel Prize.

=== Twentieth century ===
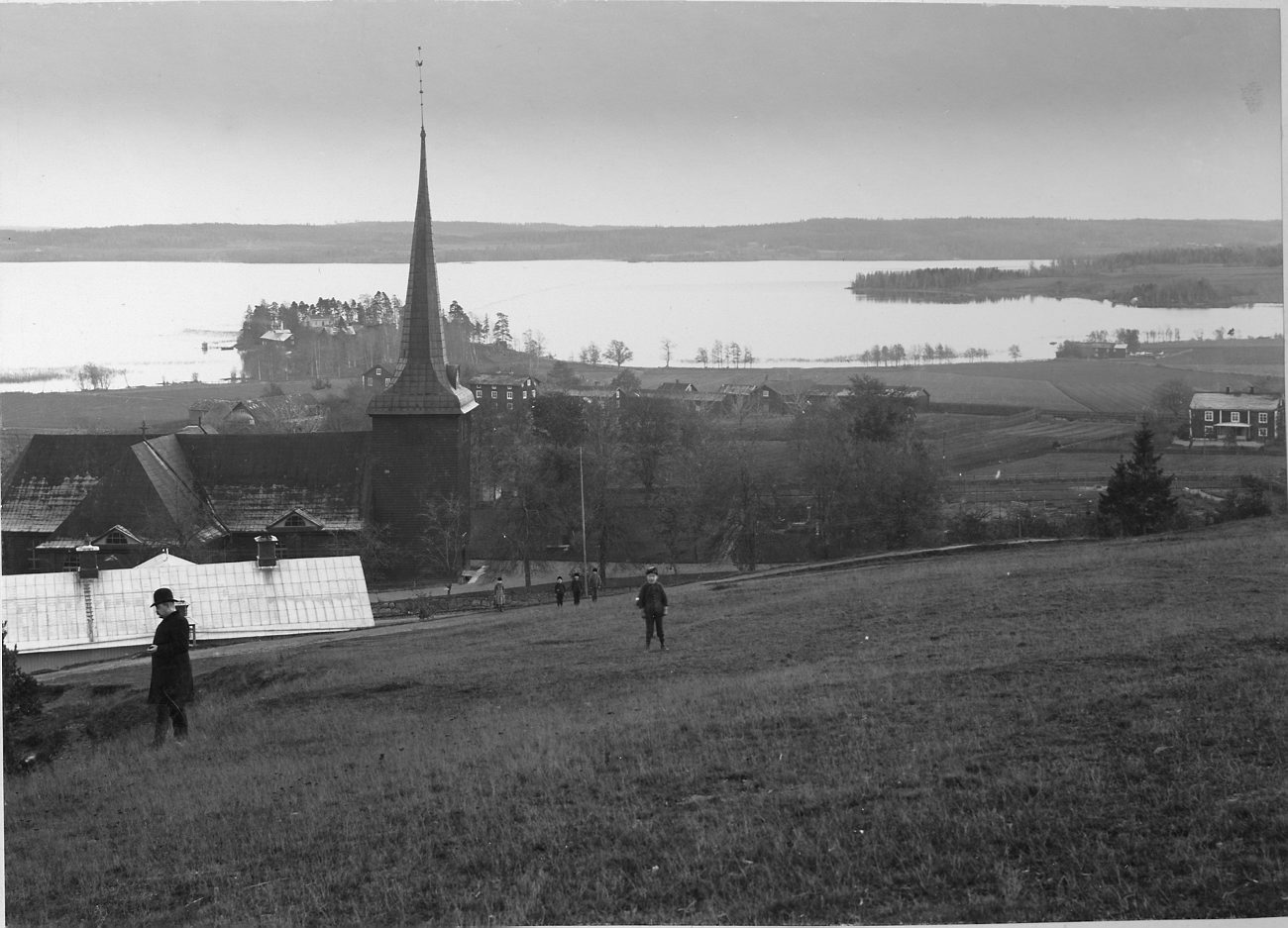
View over Bregården and Karlskoga Church in central Karlskoga

In 1940 the town of Karlskoga and the surrounding area (the same territory as today's Karlskoga Municipality) got the formal title of a city (stad). Since 1971 this term has no legal meaning and only the built-up area is considered a de facto town.

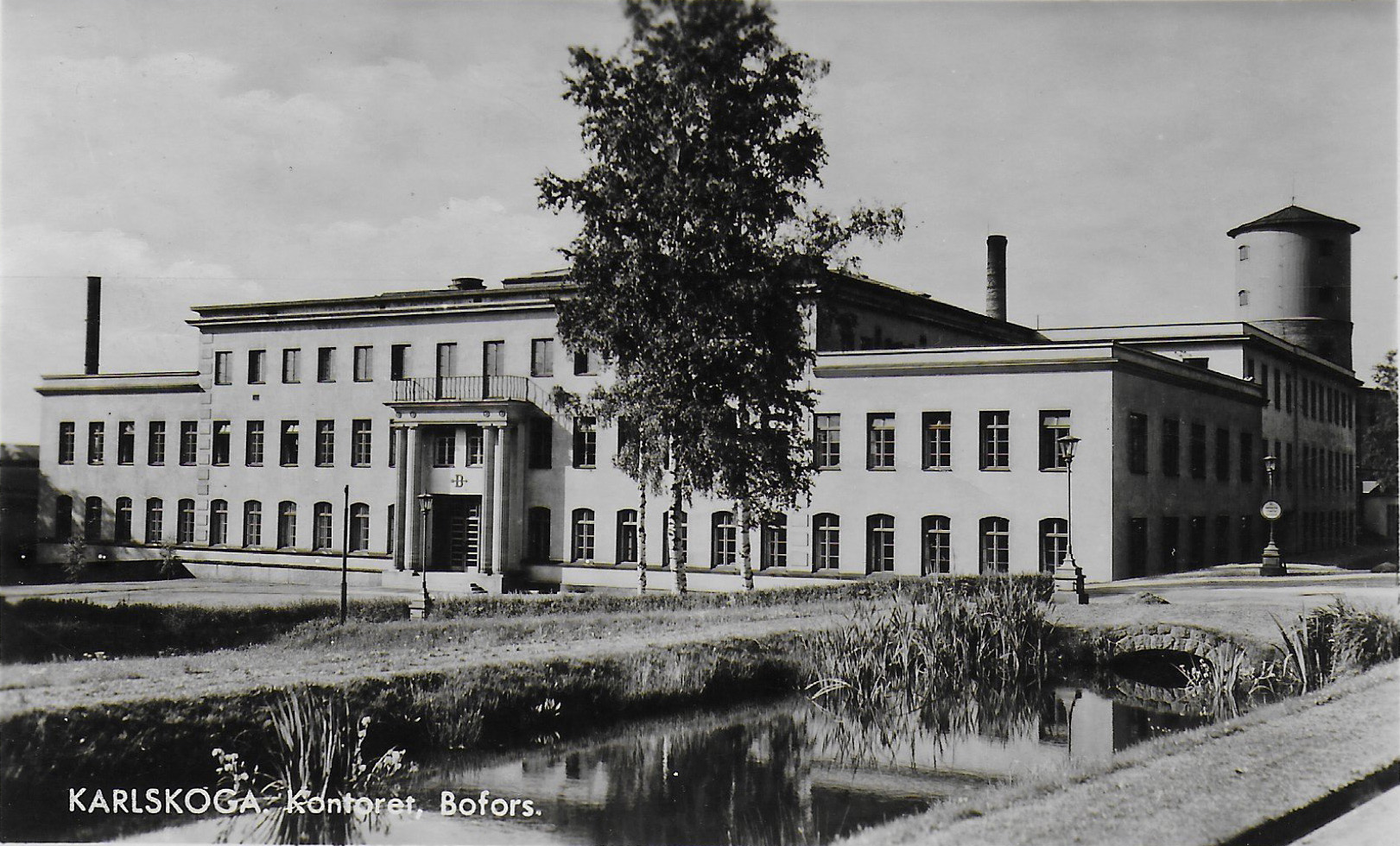
The Bofors Headquarters completed in 1930

Karlskoga spent most of the 20th century as a growing company town to Bofors. Only with the demilitarization in the most recent decades has this started to be a problem for the town. There were 8,500 workers in Bofors in 1980, but the number had decreased to 2,600 as of 1998.

On August 9, 1970, Gelleråsen near Karlskoga, Sweden, became the site of one of the most severe disasters in Scandinavian motorsport history. During the annual Kanonloppet, a catastrophic collision resulted in the deaths of five spectators and injuries.

On January 10, 1985, a gas leak occurred in Karlskoga, when a chemical plant released sulfuric acid gas over the area. The incident resulted in the evacuation of 300 people and left 20 individuals injured.

=== Recent history ===
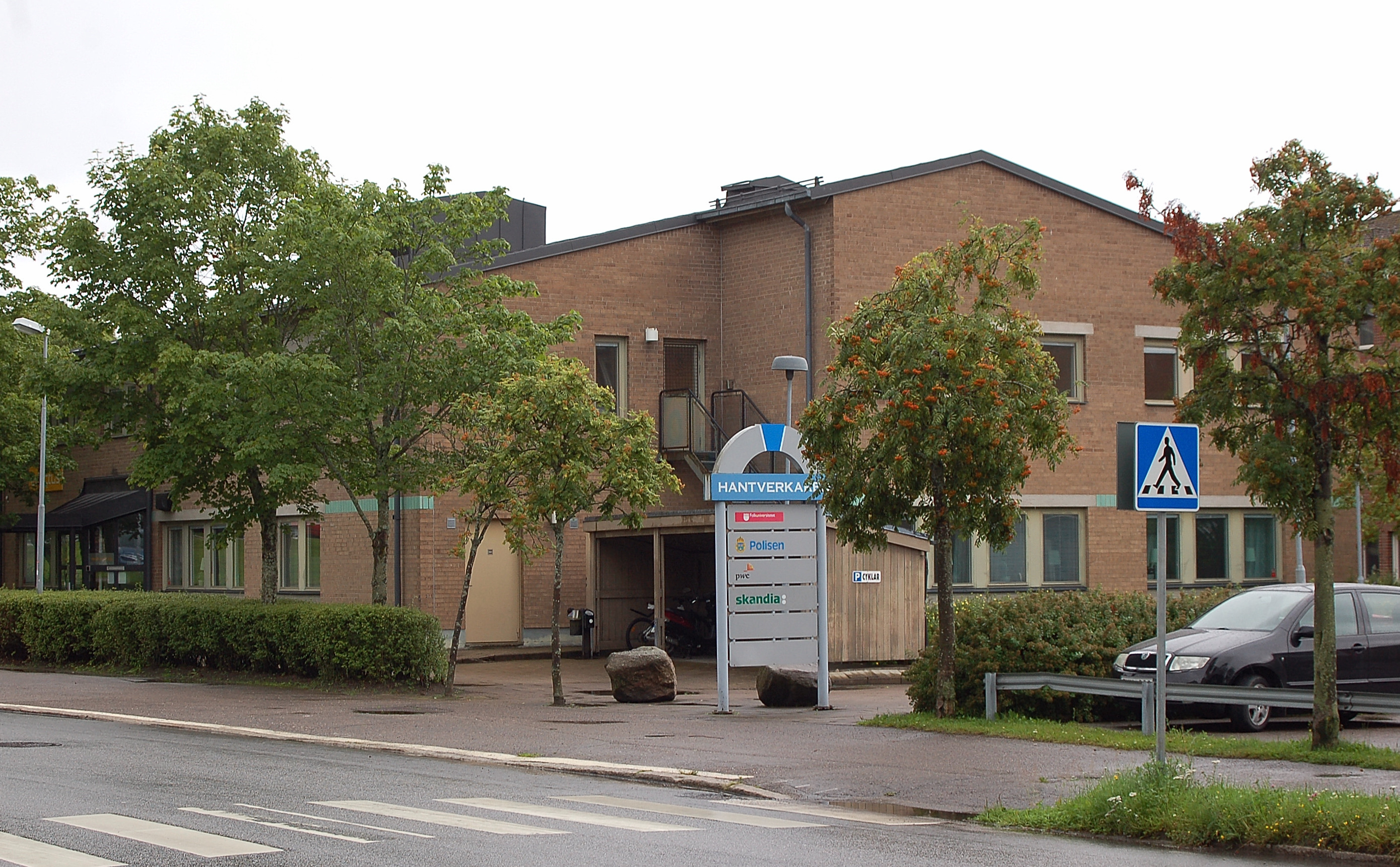
Karlskoga District Court

The local district court, which had served the community since 1951, was closed in 2009 and merged with Örebro District Court.

During the first decade of the 21st century, a downturn in the defense sector hit Karlskoga hard. The dwindling demand for military products triggered job losses and emigration, ultimately forcing the demolition of approximately 1,000 multi-family apartments as the town's population shrank to 29,600.

However, the 2010s marked a major turnaround. The population began to climb once again. The continuation of this trend was fueled by a resurgence in the local defense industry. Today, defense giants BAE Systems Bofors and Saab Bofors Dynamics are both actively expanding their operations in the area. This economic and community revitalization has paid off: in 2023, the magazine Fokus ranked Karlskoga as the 15th best municipality to live in Sweden.

== Geography ==
=== Location ===
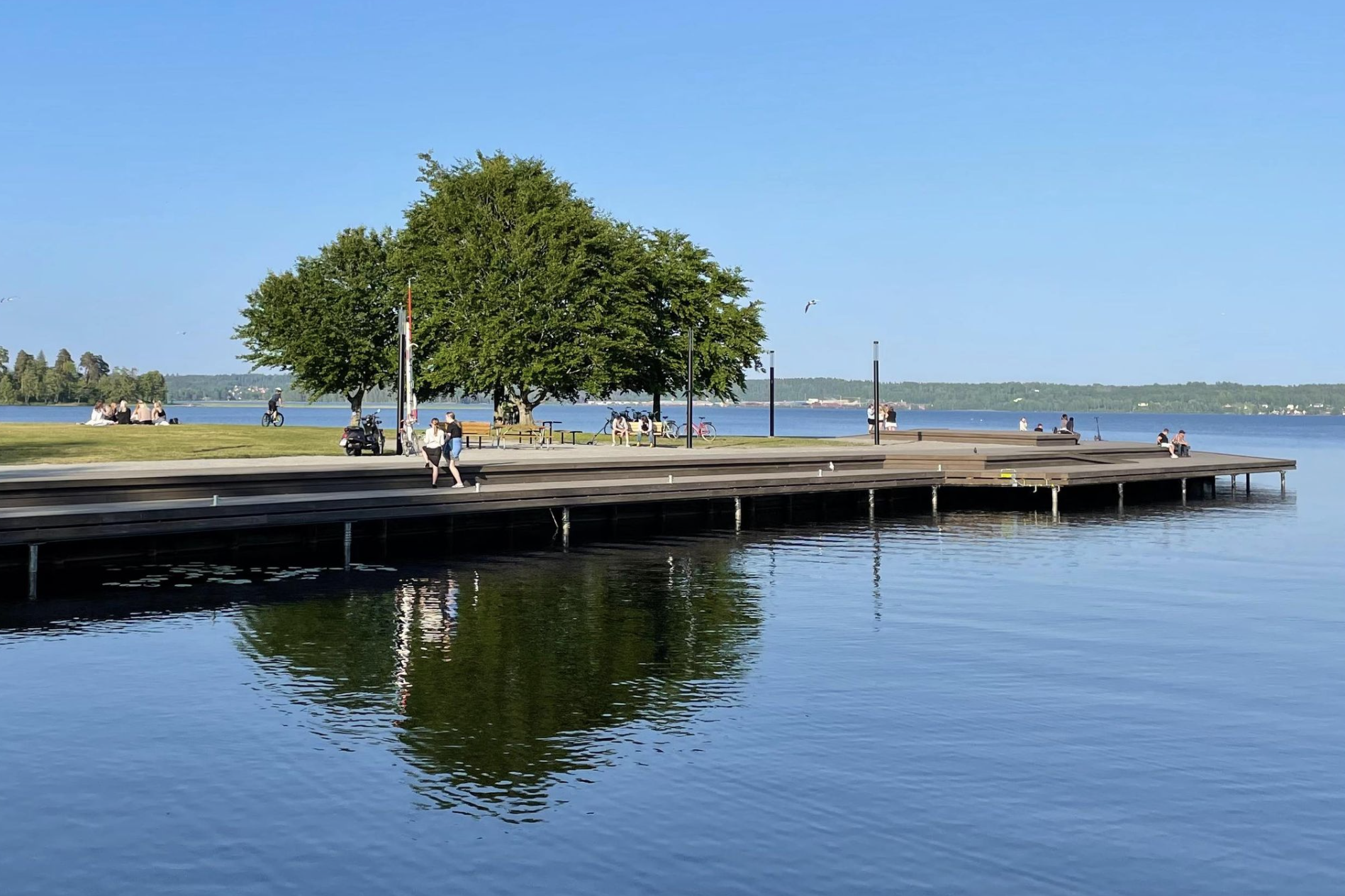
Karlskoga by Lake Möckeln

Karlskoga is situated more or less in a low mountainous ridge called Kilsbergen that separates Närke from Värmland. Such areas have traditionally been financially poor. This led to a significant Swedish emigration to North America from the district in the latter half of the 19th century. Stockholm, Wisconsin was, for instance, founded in 1854 by immigrants from Karlskoga.

The city borders on the municipalities of Hällefors and Storfors to the north; Lekeberg to the east; Degerfors and Lake Möckeln to the south; and Kristinehamn to the west.

=== Neighbourhoods ===
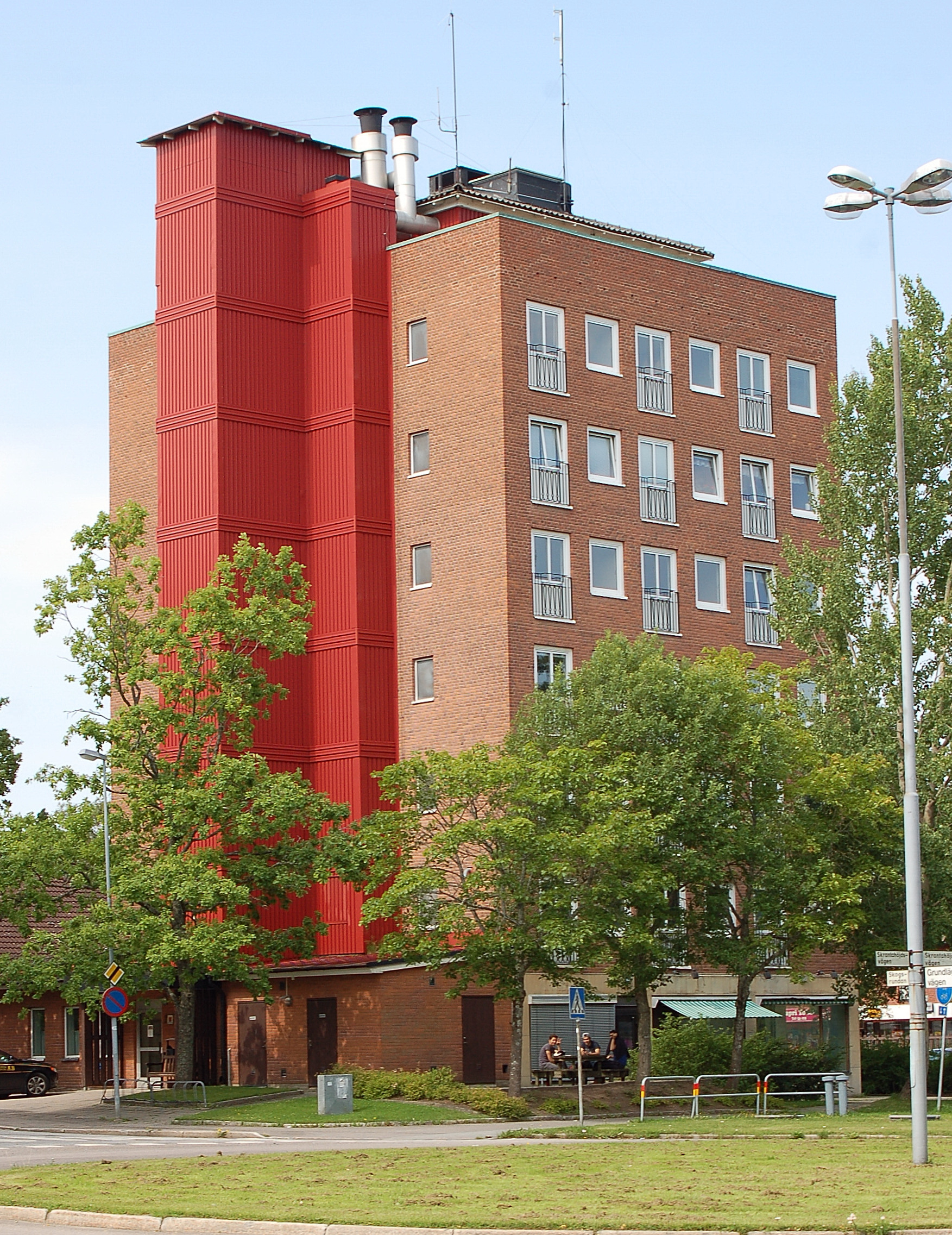
Multi-family apartment building in Skranta

The many residential communities of Karlskoga express a character distinct to the company town. Million programme residential buildings can be found in enclaves such as Baggängen, Ekeby, Sandviken and Skranta.

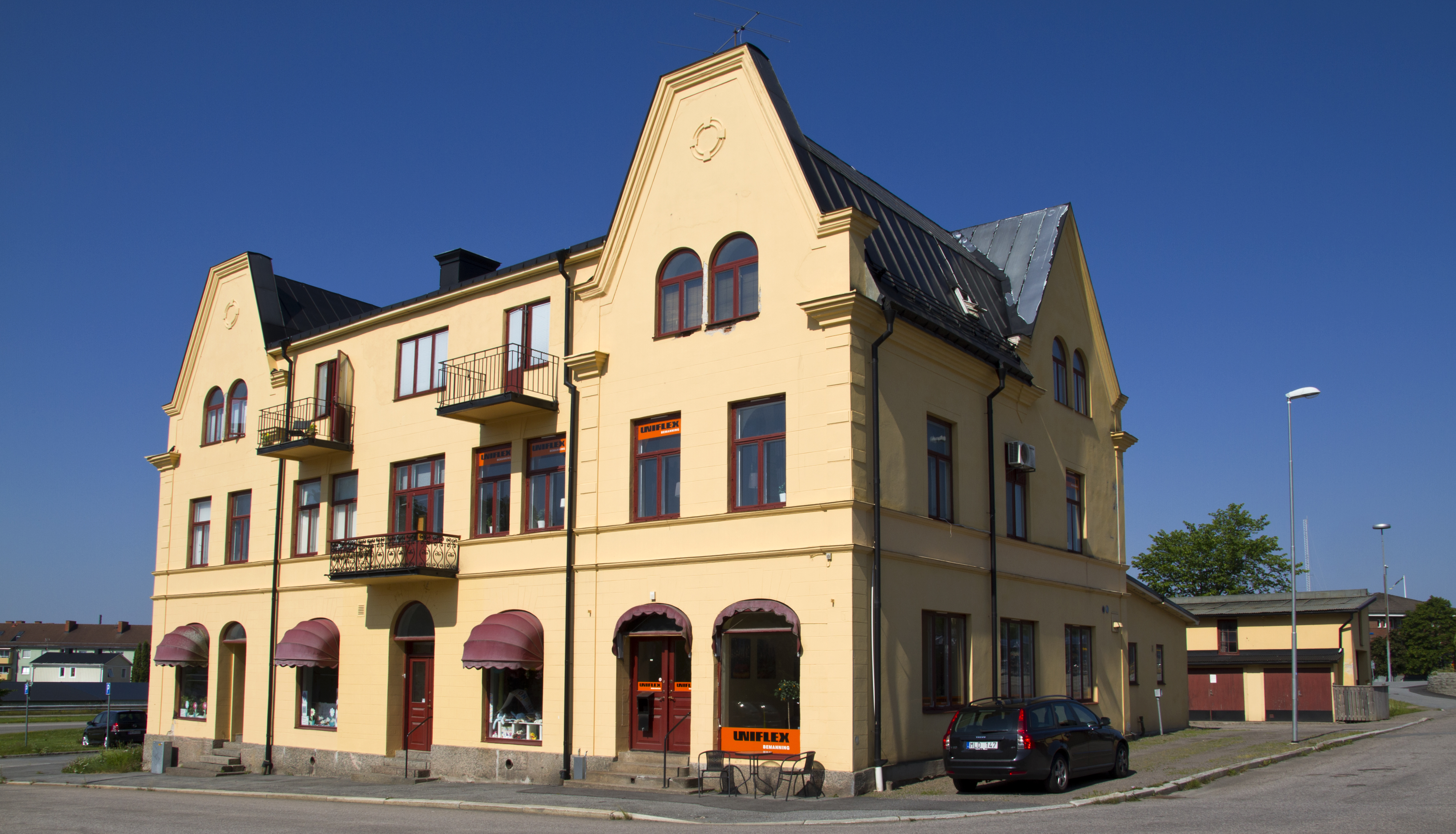
Building in central Karlskoga

The Rosendal neighbourhood, historically significant for the architecture of its homes, planned community by the Bofors Works, was designated as an area of national interest for cultural heritage.

== Demographics ==
Historical population
Year	Pop.	±%
1900	1,810	—
1960	31,433	+1636.6%
1965	34,970	+11.3%
1970	36,963	+5.7%
1975	35,425	−4.2%
1980	34,329	−3.1%
1990	31,106	−9.4%
1995	30,177	−3.0%
2000	28,579	−5.3%
2005	27,500	−3.8%
2010	27,084	−1.5%
2015	27,490	+1.5%
Population size may be affected by changes in administrative divisions.

Karlskoga's population grew steadily from the time when arms manufacturer Bofors had started to expand, until the 1970s. Thereafter, it underwent a sharp decline (down by almost 10,000 inhabitants over a 30-year period), with signs of recovery only in the very last few years as of 2021. Nevertheless, with 27,386 inhabitants, Karlskoga is the second most populous place in Örebro County following Örebro (126,009).

The presence of foreign residents in Karlskoga accounts for 16.5% of inhabitants. This compares with 19.1% in the town Örebro.

=== Migration ===
In the 1580s, a total of five Finns settled in Möckelsbodar (present-day Karlskoga). In 1649, 32 of a total of 186 agricultural holdings were occupied by Finns.

In 2017, the three most commonly reported ethnic origins (by-birth) overall were Finns (935 or 3.1 per cent), Syrians (650 or 2.1 per cent) and Somalis (409 or 1.3 per cent). (Note: Data applies to Karlskoga Municipality.)

=== Language and dialects ===
In 2012, Karlskoga Municipality received its status as a Finnish-speaking administrative municipality.

=== Religion ===
Various religious denominations and congregations are based in Karlskoga, including the Church of Sweden, which has several churches in Karlskoga. The oldest church, the Karlskoga Church, is the parish church in the Karlskoga parish and can be traced back to the 1600s. Later churches built in the city include the Karlberg Church and the Rävåsen Church. There are also several free churches represented in Karlskoga. The Swedish Pentecostal Movement has its own church, while the Jehovah's Witnesses have their Kingdom Hall.

A baptist congregation, the Bofors Baptist congregation, was established in 1884, and St. George's Catholic congregation was established in 1956.

There are several cemeteries in Karlskoga. The city's oldest cemetery was likely established when Karlskoga Church was built. North of it lies Skogskyrkogården lit. 'The Woodland Cemetery', inaugurated in 1908. The Eastern Cemetery in the eastern parts of the city was established in the 1940s.

== Economy ==
=== Manufacturing sector ===
The city is an important center for the arms manufacturing and pharmaceutical industries; it is home to various multinational corporations, including subsidiaries and divisions of Bharat Forge, BAE Systems, Saab AB (SAAB Bofors Dynamics), Nammo, Cambrex Corporation, Recipharm, Moelven Industrier, and Eurenco.

== Culture ==
=== Literature ===
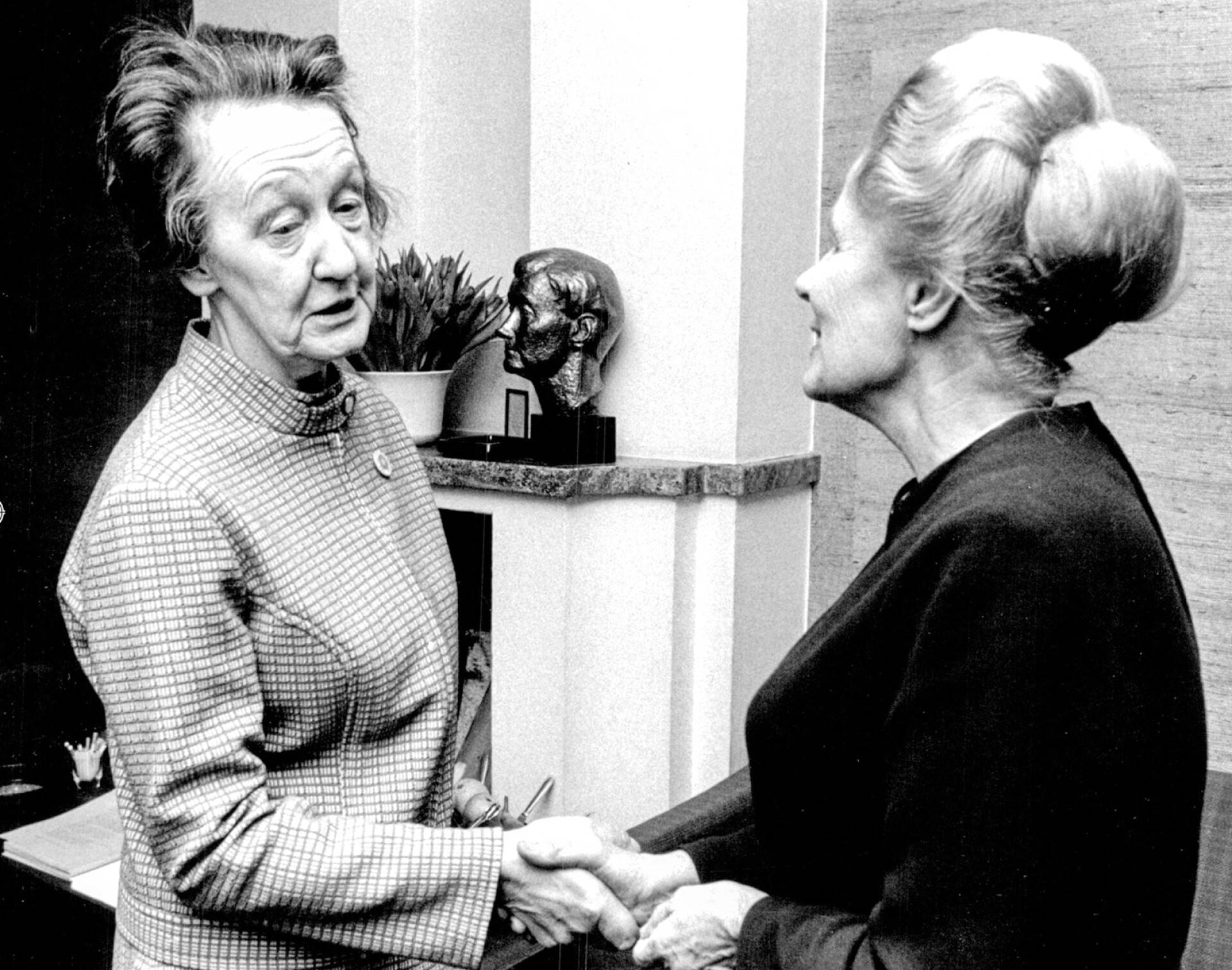
Maja Ekelöf and Alva Myrdal (right)

Karlskoga has a connection with notable literary figures, including Maja Ekelöf, whose best-selling Rapport från en skurhink was published in 1970. Nobel laureate Selma Lagerlöf stayed in Karlskoga during her confirmation period with Tullius Hammagren. In her 1925 novel "Charlotte Löwensköld," she depicts estates and surroundings in Karlskoga. Moreover, children's literature writers Anders Jacobsson and Sören Olsson are intertwined with Karlskoga, using the town as inspiration for fictional characters and locales, such as in the "Bert Diaries," which were set in the fictional town of Öreskoga.

=== Media ===
Karlskoga Tidning-Kuriren stands as Karlskoga's primary and sole daily newspaper. It formed through the merger of Karlskoga Tidning and Karlskoga Kuriren, the city's two former daily newspapers, it came into existence in 2020. There is also a commercial radio station based in Karlskoga, Cityradion.

== Sport ==
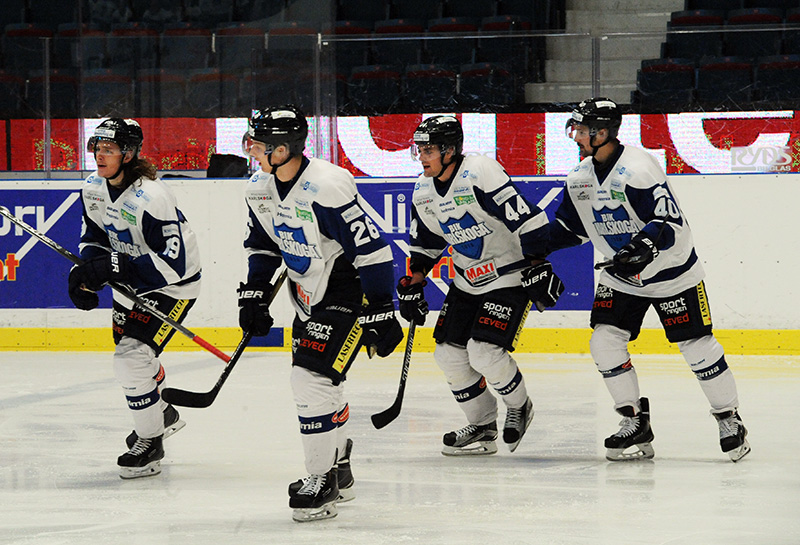
BIK Karlskoga ice hockey players

Karlskoga is home to several stadiums, of which Nobelhallen is the largest (it hosted the 1979 World Junior Ice Hockey Championships). Karlskoga is home to the ice hockey team BIK Karlskoga, established in 1978, currently playing as per the 2021–2022 season in HockeyAllsvenskan, the second tier of Swedish ice hockey.

Karlskoga also upholds a heritage in diving and canoeing, housing clubs like Bofors SHK and Bofors KK. Notable Olympic champions include Ulrika Knape in diving, as well as Agneta Andersson and Maria Haglund in canoeing.

There is also a football team called KB Karlskoga FF, and a women's soccer team, Rävåsen IK.

== Notable people ==
=== Arts ===
- Monica Forsberg, singer, songwriter and actress
- Allt, progressive metalcore band

=== Sports ===
- Agneta Andersson, sprint canoer, Olympic gold medalist
- Bengt-Åke Gustafsson, former NHL player
- Anna Karlsson, sprint canoer
- Maria Haglund, sprint canoer, Olympic bronze medalist
- Johan Motin, NHL player
- Ulrika Knape, diver, winner of one gold and two silver Olympic medals

=== Others ===
- Peter Arvai, co-founder of Prezi
- Alfred Nobel. He lived at the Björkborn Manor house, on the property of the Bofors works, which he owned. His residency there is the reason his will was adjudicated in Karlskoga, establishing the Nobel Prizes.
- Stina Swartling, writer
