= Kortfors =

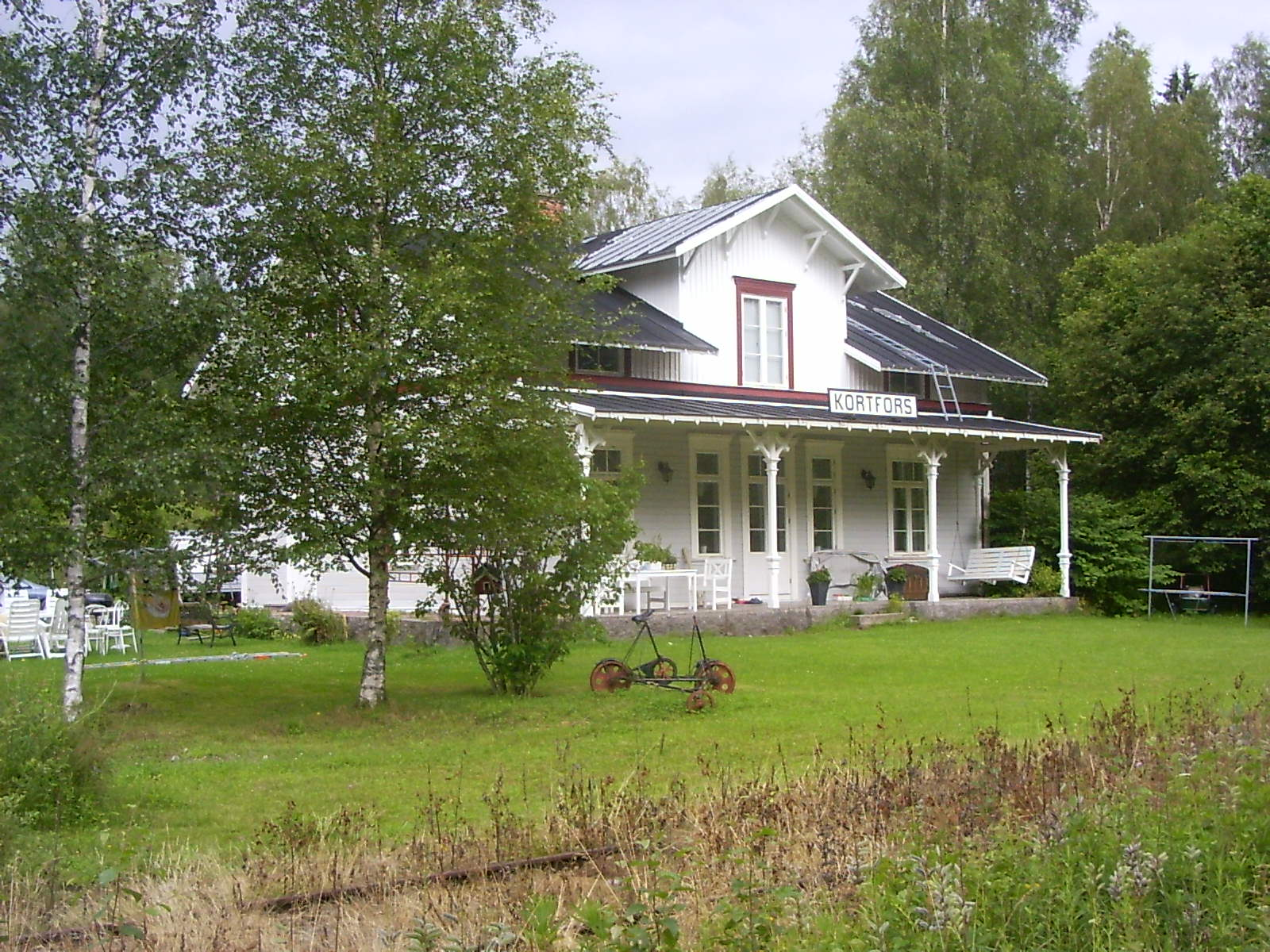
- Kortfors railway station

- Location within Örebro Location within Sweden
- Coordinates: 59°24′N 14°40′E
- Country: Sweden
- County: Örebro County
- Municipality: Karlskoga Municipality
- Time zone: UTC+1 (CET)
  - Summer (DST): UTC+2 (CEST)

Kortfors (Swedish pronunciation: [kɔʈˈfoːʂ]) is an urban settlement by the railway, situated in Karlskoga Municipality, Örebro County, Sweden. The settlement is located east of Granbergsdal Ironworks, northeast of Karlskoga and southwest of Nora.

Kortfors railway station functioned as a junction station, as it connects the Nora–Karlskoga Line to the Svartälvs Järnväg.

Kortfors was established as an ironworks in the 17th century, and the ironworks closed down in the 1920s. At the end of the 17th century, ironmaster Georg de Besche acquired Kortfors, and then by Johan Stensson Hammarström. In mid-18th century, Carl Daniel Luthman acquired it, followed by Georg Ahlborg, Per Castorin and Carl Lindberg. At the end of its operational years, in the 20th century, the ironworks was acquired by the AB Héroults Elektriska Stål, established in 1902 by the French metallurgist Paul Héroult.
