= Bofors railway station =

Railway station in Sweden

Coordinates: 59.3335°N 14.5476°E

Bofors station
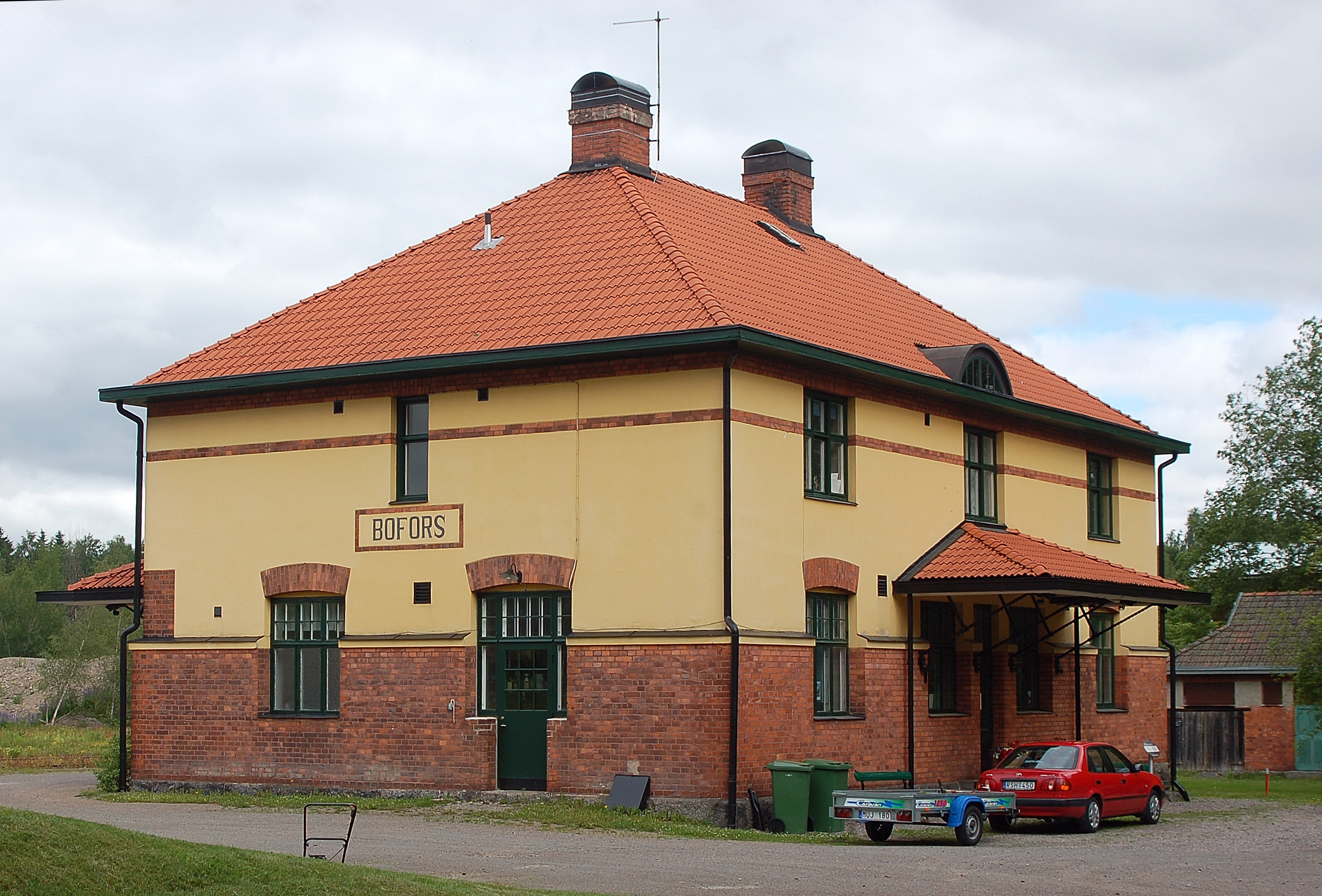
- Bofors station building

General information
- Location: Karlskoga, Karlskoga Municipality; Sweden

Other information
- Website: Boforsstation.se

History
- Opened: 1 January 1874

Services
Preceding station	Disused railways	Following station
Kortfors	Nora–Karlskoga Line	Hyttåsen
Location

Bofors railway station (Swedish: Bofors järnvägsstation, Swedish: [buːˈfɔʂː]) is a railway station in Karlskoga, Sweden, located on the Nora-Carlskoga Line. In 1966, the station stopped serving passenger traffic and began to serve freight transport full-on.

The station opened on January 1, 1874.

In 1908, the yellow-colored station building was erected.

== See also ==
- Rail transport in Sweden
