= Kortfors railway station =

Railway station in Sweden

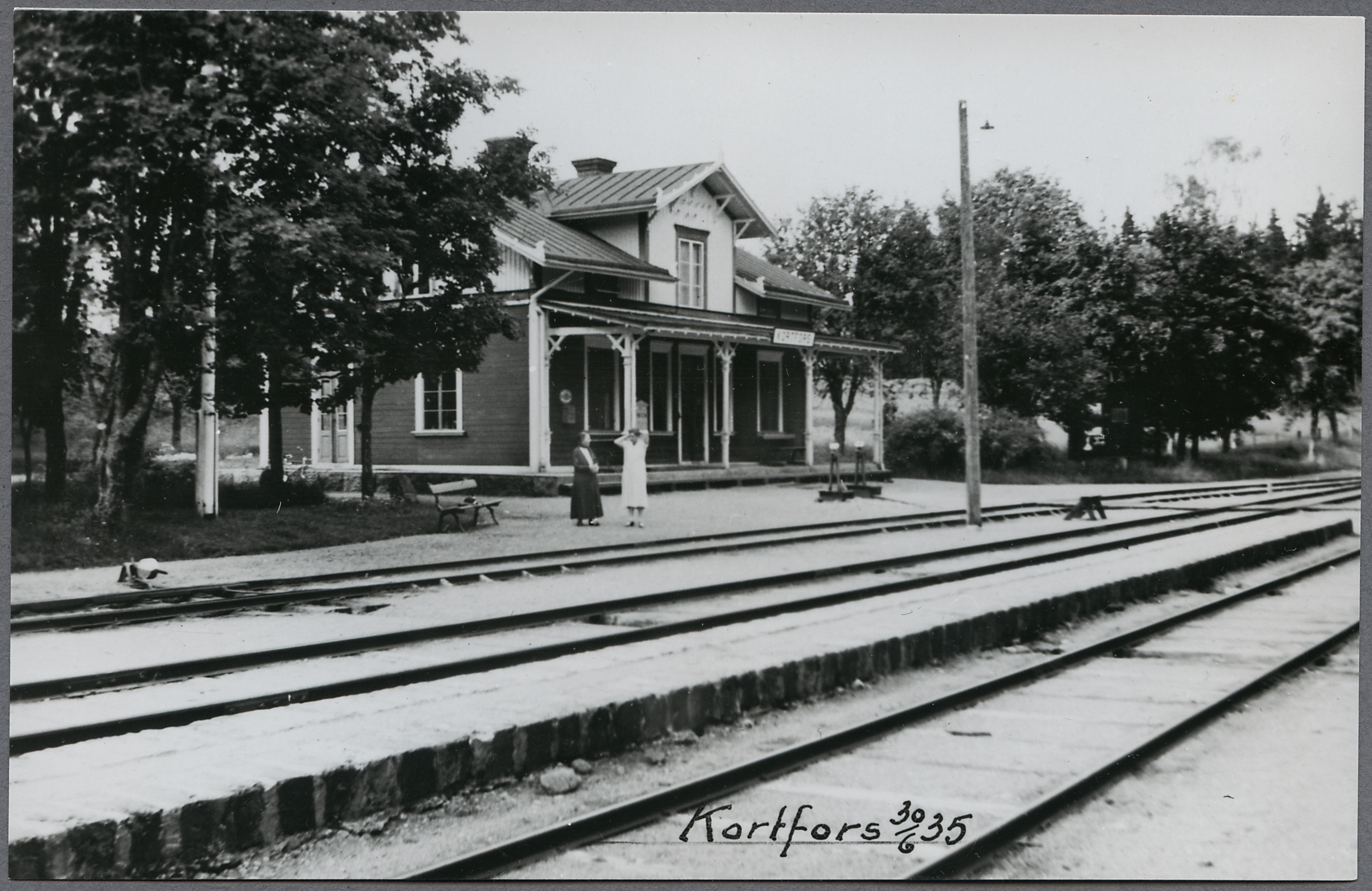
- Kortfors station building

General information
- Location: Kortfors, Karlskoga Municipality; Sweden
- Coordinates: 59°25′04″N 14°40′32″E

Services
Preceding station	Disused railways	Following station
Vikersvik	Nora–Karlskoga Line	Bofors
Location

Kortfors railway station (Swedish: Kortfors järnvägsstation) was a railway station in Kortfors, a former railway junction, in Karlskoga Municipality, Sweden.

The Kortfors station opened in 1874 when the Nora–Karlskoga Line was inaugurated. A siding to Karlsdals Bruk also opened the same year. In 1966, passenger traffic between Nora and Karlskoga was discontinued and Kortfors was downgraded. In 1985, freight traffic was also discontinued.
