= Karlskoga railway station =

Railway station in Sweden

Karlskoga railway station Karlskoga järnvägsstation
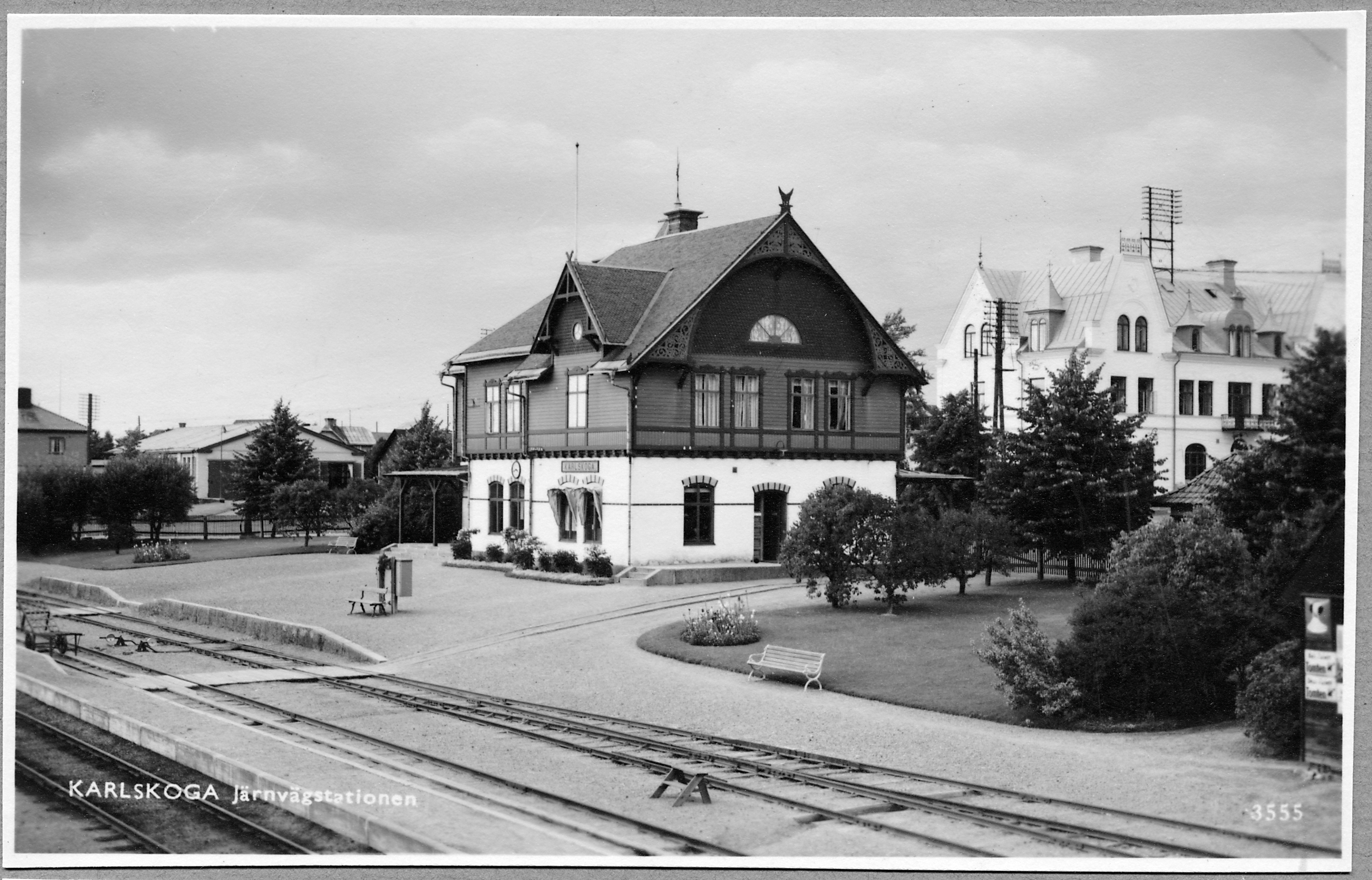
- Karlskoga station building

General information
- Location: Karlskoga, Karlskoga Municipality; Sweden
- Coordinates: 59.3257°N 14.5125°E

History
- Opening: 1900s
- Closed: 1974

Services
Preceding station	Disused railways	Following station
Central Karlskoga	Nora–Karlskoga Line	Ekeby
Location

Karlskoga railway station (Swedish: Karlskoga järnvägsstation) was a railway station in Karlskoga, along the Nora–Karlskoga Line, in Karlskoga Municipality, Sweden.

Originally named Bregårdstorp, the station changed its name on October 1, 1900, after the "Carlskoga station" in Strömtorp, Degerfors Municipality, changed its name to Strömtorp station. It was erected in 1900 to 1901, and demolished in 1974.
