= Aggerud =

Coordinates: 59°18′39″N 14°29′48″E

- Location within Örebro Location within Sweden
- Country: Sweden
- Province: Värmland
- County: Örebro County
- Municipality: Karlskoga Municipality
- Time zone: UTC+1 (CET)
  - Summer (DST): UTC+2 (CEST)

Aggerud is a district in Karlskoga, Sweden. The area is situated on the western shore of Lake Möckeln, and was largely developed in the mid-20th century.

== History ==
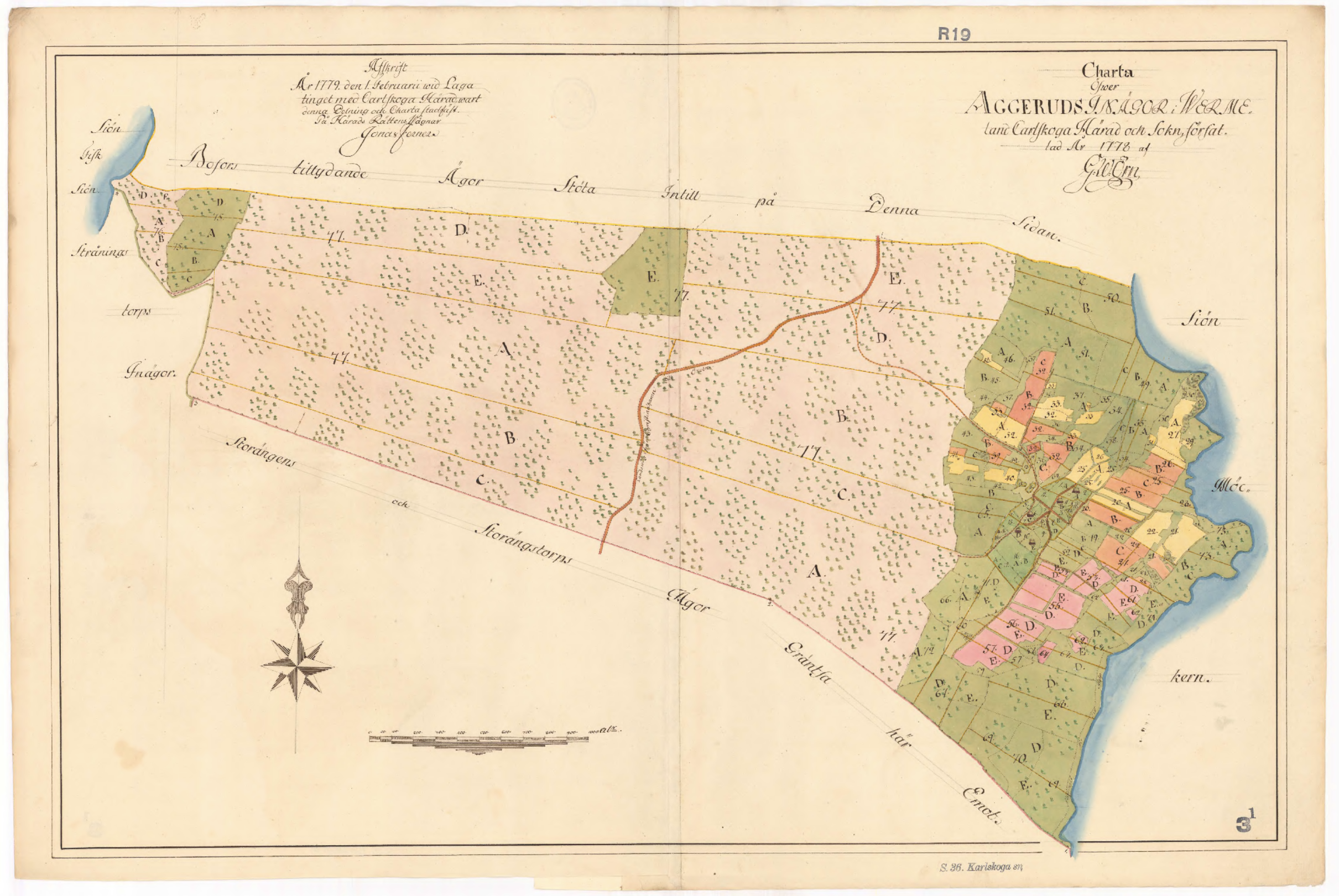
1778 map of Aggerud

The cottage in "Agarud" was first mentioned in the land registries in the 1540s, later giving its name to the area. Today, the historic homestead (bergsmansgård) serves as a local heritage center and hosts several annual events, including traditional Midsummer celebrations.

The Aggerud area consists largely of single-story family homes featuring timber or brick facades. During the 1960s, expansion continued southward with predominantly single-story brick housing, comprising both detached homes and linked houses.

The Aggerud School, a primary school, founded in 1955, is located in the district and has more than 400 students. Notable former PE teachers include Sven-Göran Eriksson, who managed the England national football team, while notable alumni include Arne Wiig, a chaplain to the Royal Court.
