= Storängsudden =

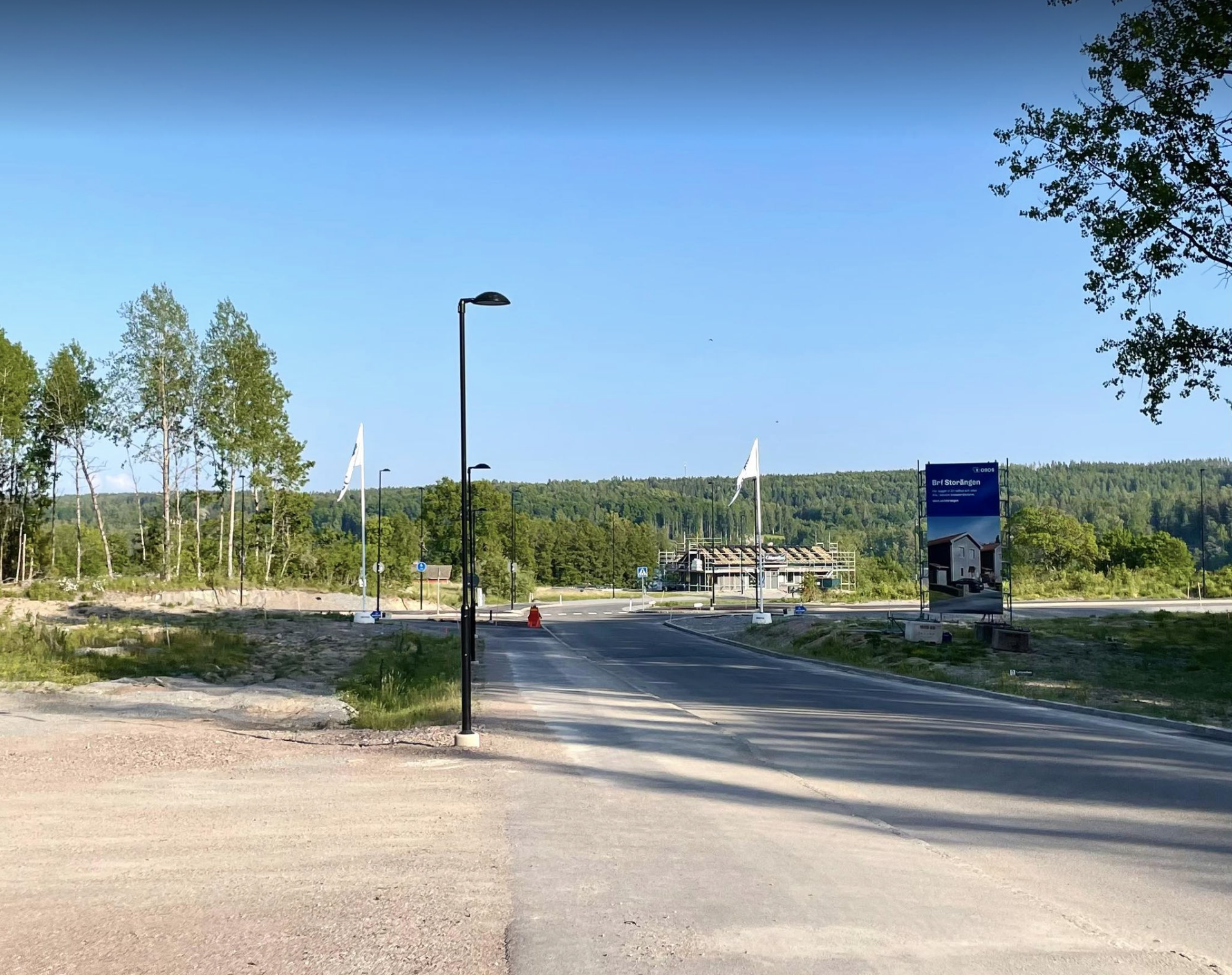

- Location within Örebro Location within Sweden
- Coordinates: 59°17′N 14°30′E
- Country: Sweden
- Province: Värmland
- County: Örebro County
- Municipality: Karlskoga Municipality

Population (2023)
  - Total: 75
- Time zone: UTC+1 (CET)
  - Summer (DST): UTC+2 (CEST)

Storängsudden is a minor locality situated in Karlskoga Municipality, Örebro County, Sweden with 75 inhabitants in 2023.

The area included in the locality encompasses the Finnebäck area, a name that recalls the Finnish settlements in the Karlskoga region dating back to the 16th and 17th centuries. When the local municipality decided to develop the area and create new residential lots, they chose instead to market it under the name "Storängstrand", as the former name was not considered appealing enough. This raised questions regarding place-names in the local debate.
