= Karlskoga (disambiguation) =

Karlskoga is the municipal seat of Karlskoga Municipality and the second-largest city in Värmland.

Karlskoga may also refer to:

== Places ==
=== Sweden ===
- Karlskoga Municipality, municipality in Örebro County
- Karlskoga Socken, socken

== Sports ==
- Karlskoga Motorstadion, motorsport race track
- Karlskoga IF
- BIK Karlskoga, ice hockey team
