= Linnebäck =

- Smaller locality
- Location within Örebro Location within Sweden
- Coordinates: 59°19′N 14°23′E
- Country: Sweden
- Province: Värmland
- County: Örebro County
- Municipality: Karlskoga Municipality

Population (31 December 2015)
  - Total: 136
- Time zone: UTC+1 (CET)
  - Summer (DST): UTC+2 (CEST)

Linnebäck is a locality situated in Karlskoga Municipality, Örebro County, Sweden with 136 inhabitants in 2015.
