= Bregården =

Coordinates: 59°19′19″N 14°31′09″E

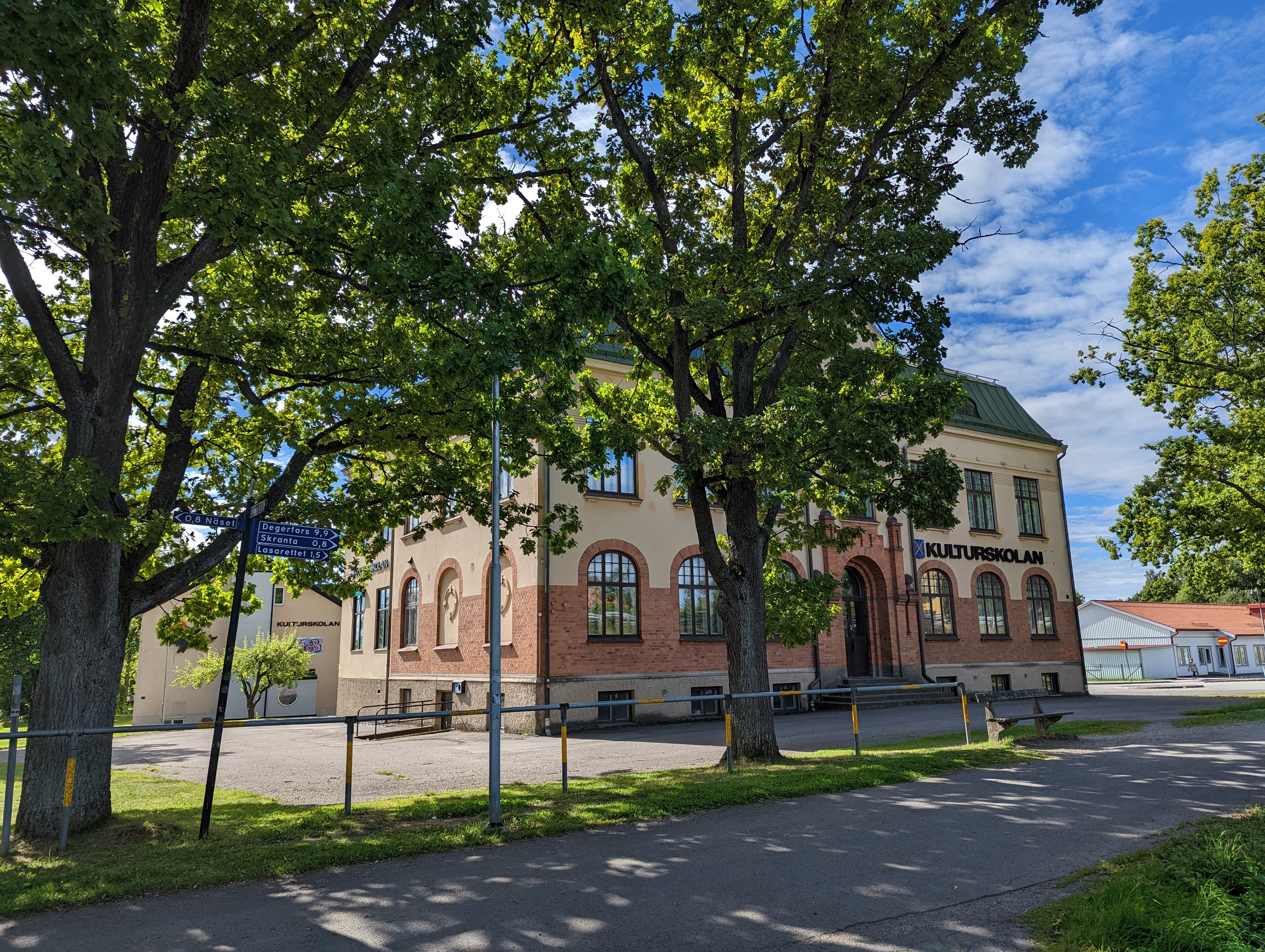

- Location within Örebro Location within Sweden
- Country: Sweden
- Province: Värmland
- County: Örebro County
- Municipality: Karlskoga Municipality
- Time zone: UTC+1 (CET)
  - Summer (DST): UTC+2 (CEST)

Bregården is a district in Karlskoga, Sweden. The area is situated on the northern shore of Lake Möckeln, and was largely developed in the mid-20th century.

== History ==
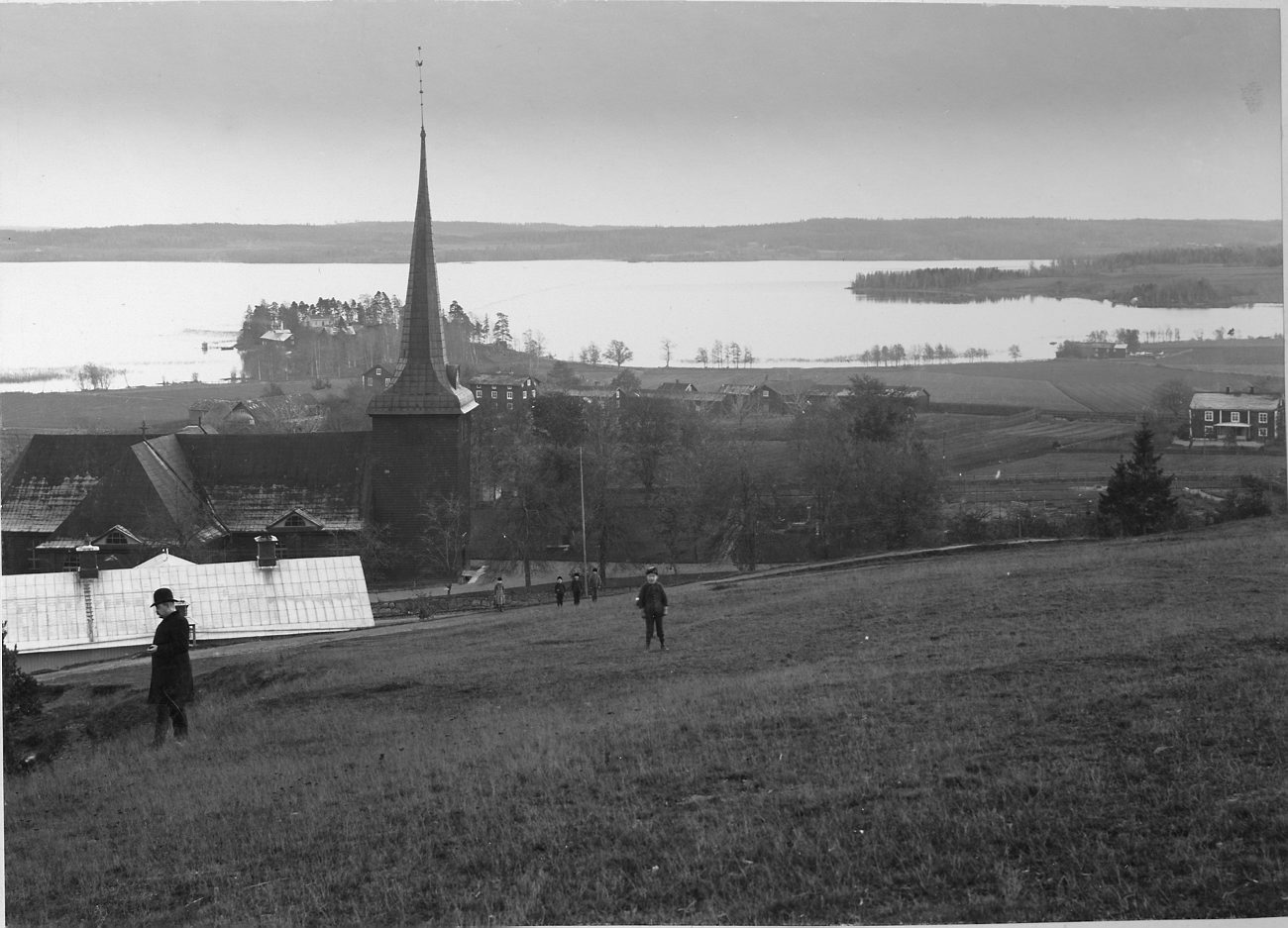
Photograph of the Bregården area prior to the city-like structure of today, seen from the north

The oldest remaining buildings in the area date back to the 1850s. More extensive residential development did not begin until around the 1930s.
