= Granbergsdal Ironworks =

Coordinates: 59°24′07″N 14°34′49″E

- Granbergsdals hytta
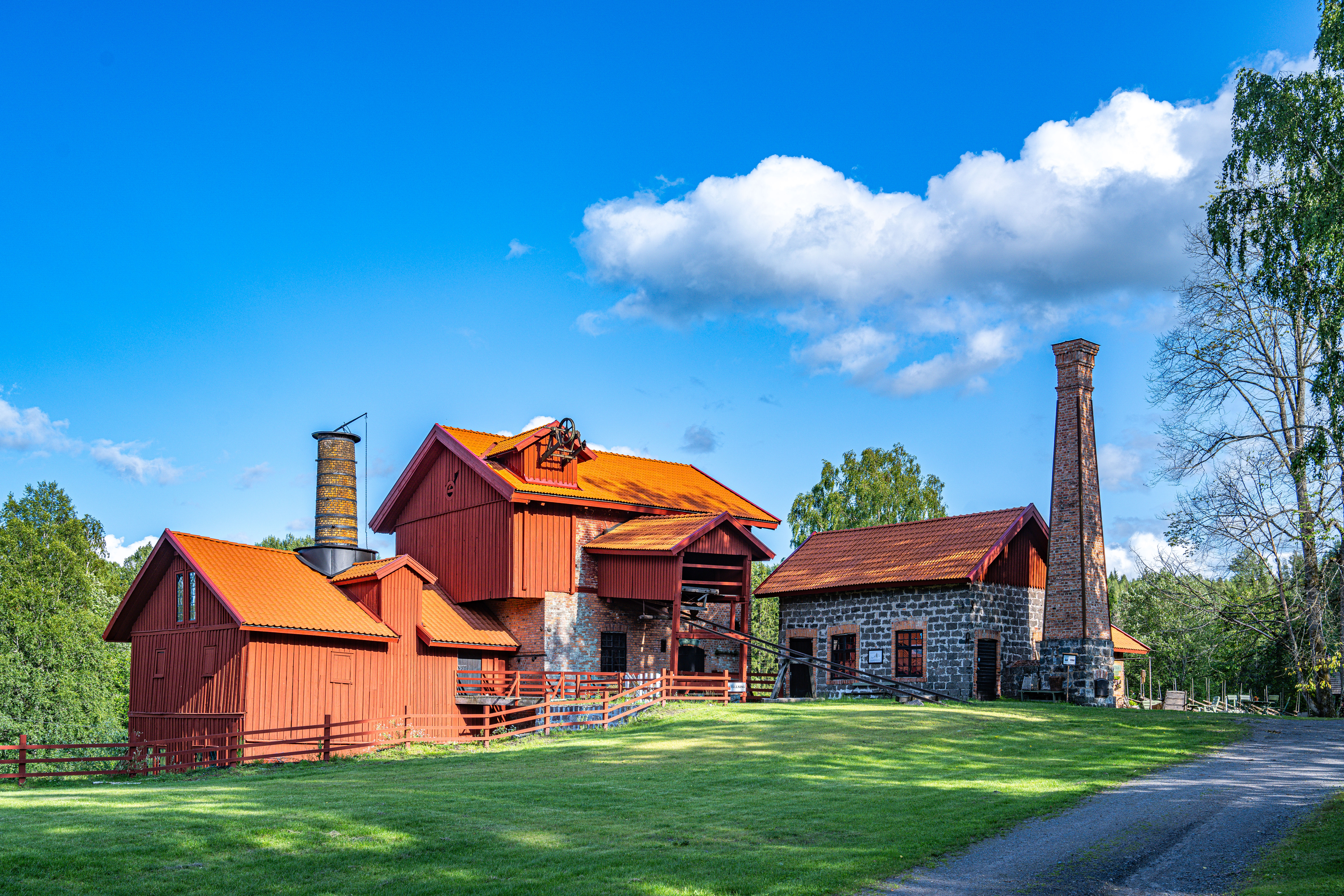
- Granbergsdal Ironworks in 2024
- Interactive map of the Granbergsdal Ironworks area

General information
- Type: Ironworks
- Location: Granbergsdal, Sweden

Design and construction
- Designations

Listed Building
- Designated: 1986; 1993
- Reference no.: 21400000693810

Granbergsdal Ironworks (Swedish: Granbergsdals bruk) is an ironworks and blast furnace in Granbergsdal, a village in Karlskoga Municipality in Sweden, 10 km (6 mi) north of central Karlskoga.

== History ==
Designated as a listed building in 1986, the ironworks benefits from cultural and historical protection.

Founded in 1642 by Mårten Eriksson, Granbergsdal Ironworks emerged in response to the increased demand for iron during the tumultuous period of the Thirty Years' War. However, operations at the ironworks ceased in 1925.

The 2023 renovation of the works was delayed in May because of the discovery of a previously unknown standing historical house.
