= Arne Wiig =

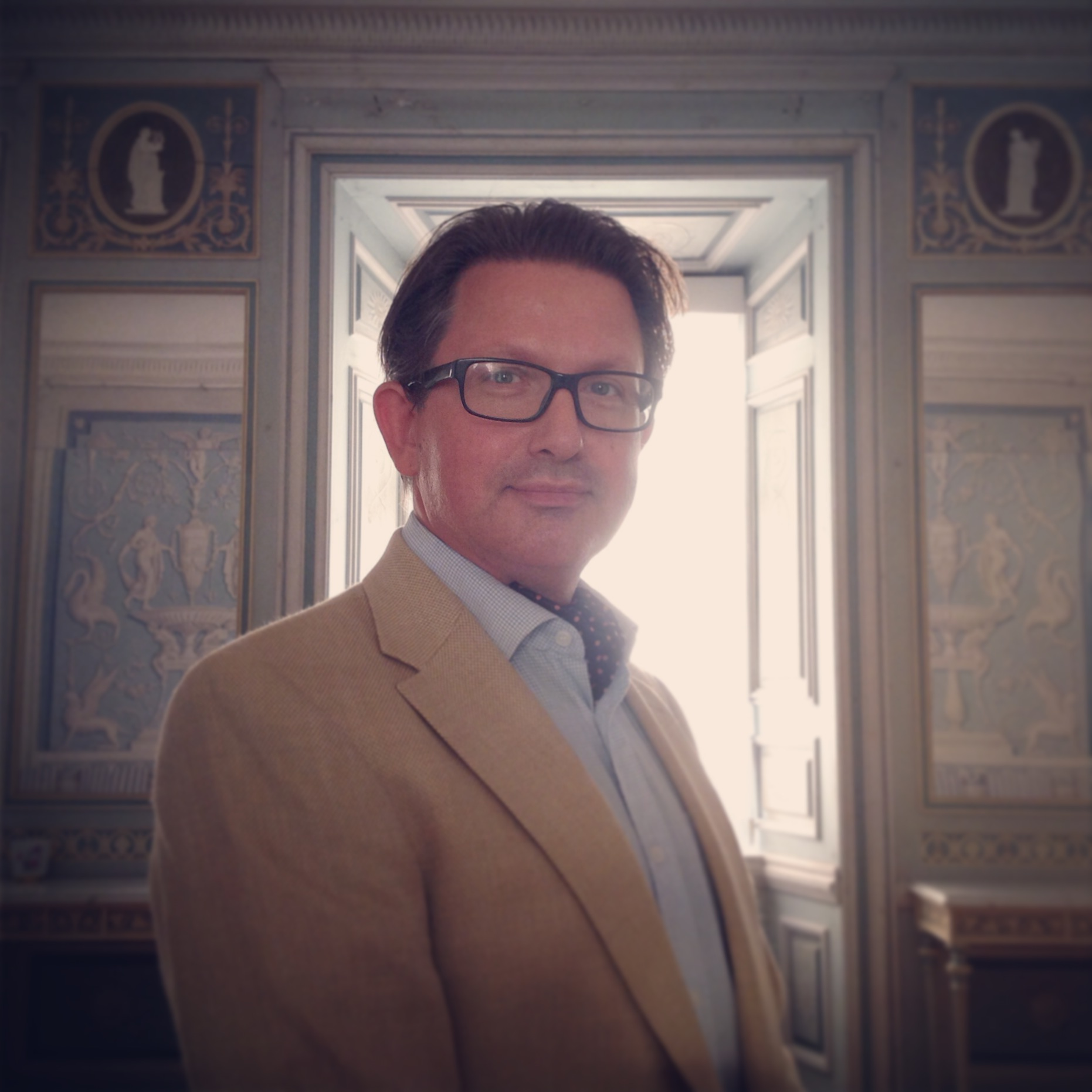
Arne Wiig in the Blue Hall

Arne Ivar Wiig (born 24 August 1964) is a Swedish doctor of theology, e.o chaplain to the royal court, minister, poet, author, playwright, actor, hymnwriter, translator, lecturer.

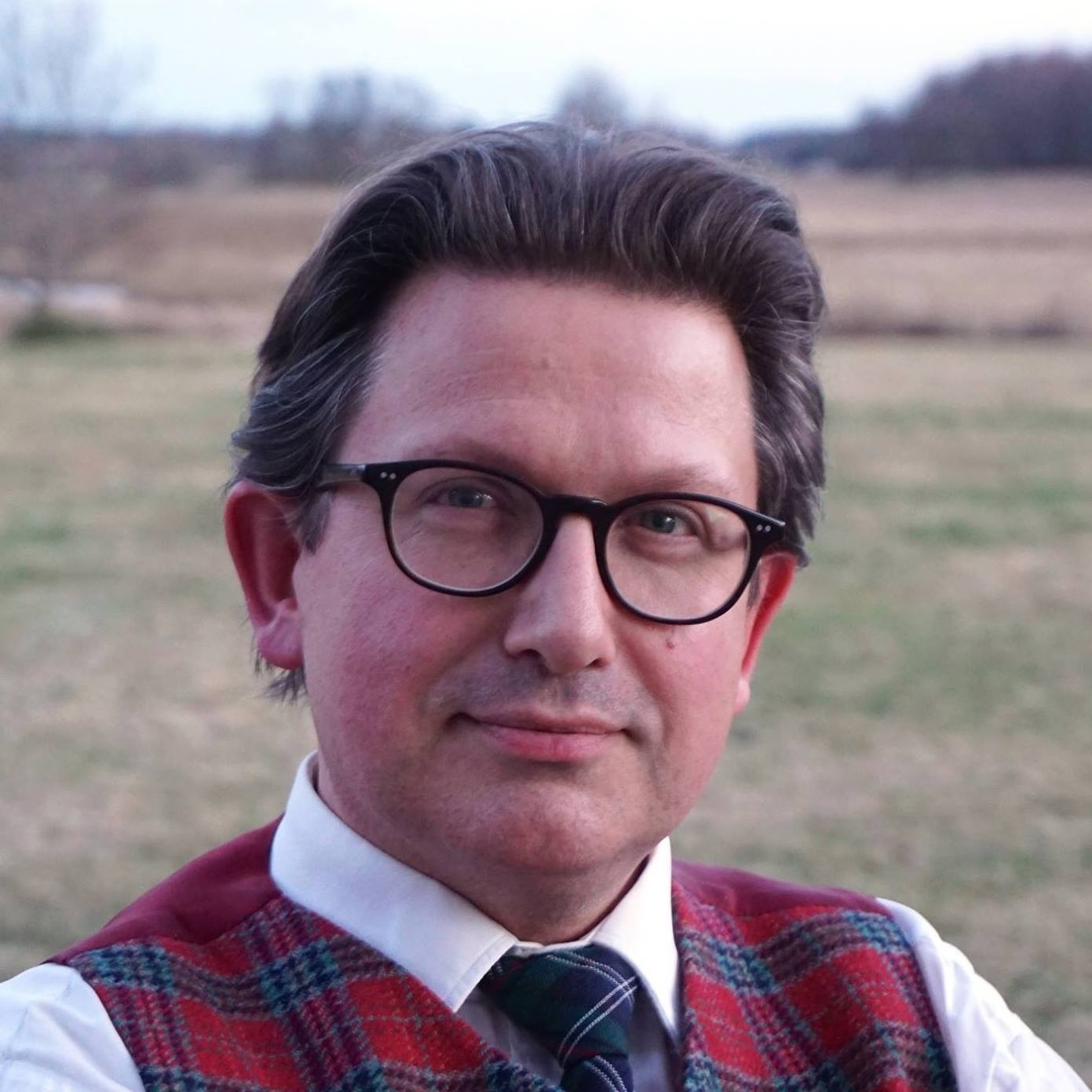
In front of the park at Salsta Castle, Sweden

Wiig was born in Karlskoga, Värmland. He was educated at KadS A9 Kristinehamn (1983–84). He earned his Master of Divinity at Lund University (1988) and began his doctoral studies there. Ordained as minister in the Church of Sweden in Karlstad Cathedral (1989). Bachelor of Arts (1993), Master of Art (1996), Licentiat of Theology (1997), Doctor of Theology (1999). e.o Chaplain to the royal court (2024). Chairman of the Frans Michael Franzén Society, Sweden. Hemit nr 339 at Johan Henrik Thomanders Studenthem Lund, Sweden.

Wiig is former Cathedral Canon at Härnösands Domkyrkoförsamling and associate professor at Mid Sweden University. Currently Lecturer, Writer and managing director. Wiig is now known as a researcher and interpreter of art- and religious symbolism. Wiig is the host for and producer of the YouTube Channel Symbols, Codes and Signs.

== Works ==
- Mene, mene tekel u-farsin (SEÅ 1988, p. 37), "Lyrics" ( Grupp 93, Gedins förlag 1993, p. 58), Promise, Protection and Prosperity. Aspects of the "Shield" as a Religious Relational Metaphor in an Ancient Near Eastern Perspective,
- En svensk Markuspassion, tankar kring människorna, musiken och motiven (Pohjanen, Sixten 2004) Frans Michael Franzén Myten och Människan. 2006.
- "Den oromantiska kampen för en romantisk domkyrka" HSS Studier och uppsatser 2006. Hymns published at Gehrmans Musikförlag and Wessmans Musikförlag: Du talar till oss [Musiktryck] : för SATB-kör, flöjt och piano, eller kör a cappella / text: Arne Wiig (2004), Tango till tröst [Musiktryck] / text: Arne Wiig (2006), I livets sommartid [Musiktryck] : för kör a cappella och flöjt ad lib. / text: Arne Wiig (2007), Långfredagshymn [Musiktryck] / text: Arne Wiig (2007), Art Exhibitions: Stockholm, Uppsala/ Galleri Gerger 2002 "It is Green!" /Drama on Härnösands Teater "Rubbat bo" 22 November 2008. Tusen år till, Glimtar från Kulturarvet i Svenska kyrkan, "Symboler och Symbolik", Verbum 2014, "
