= Otterbäcken =

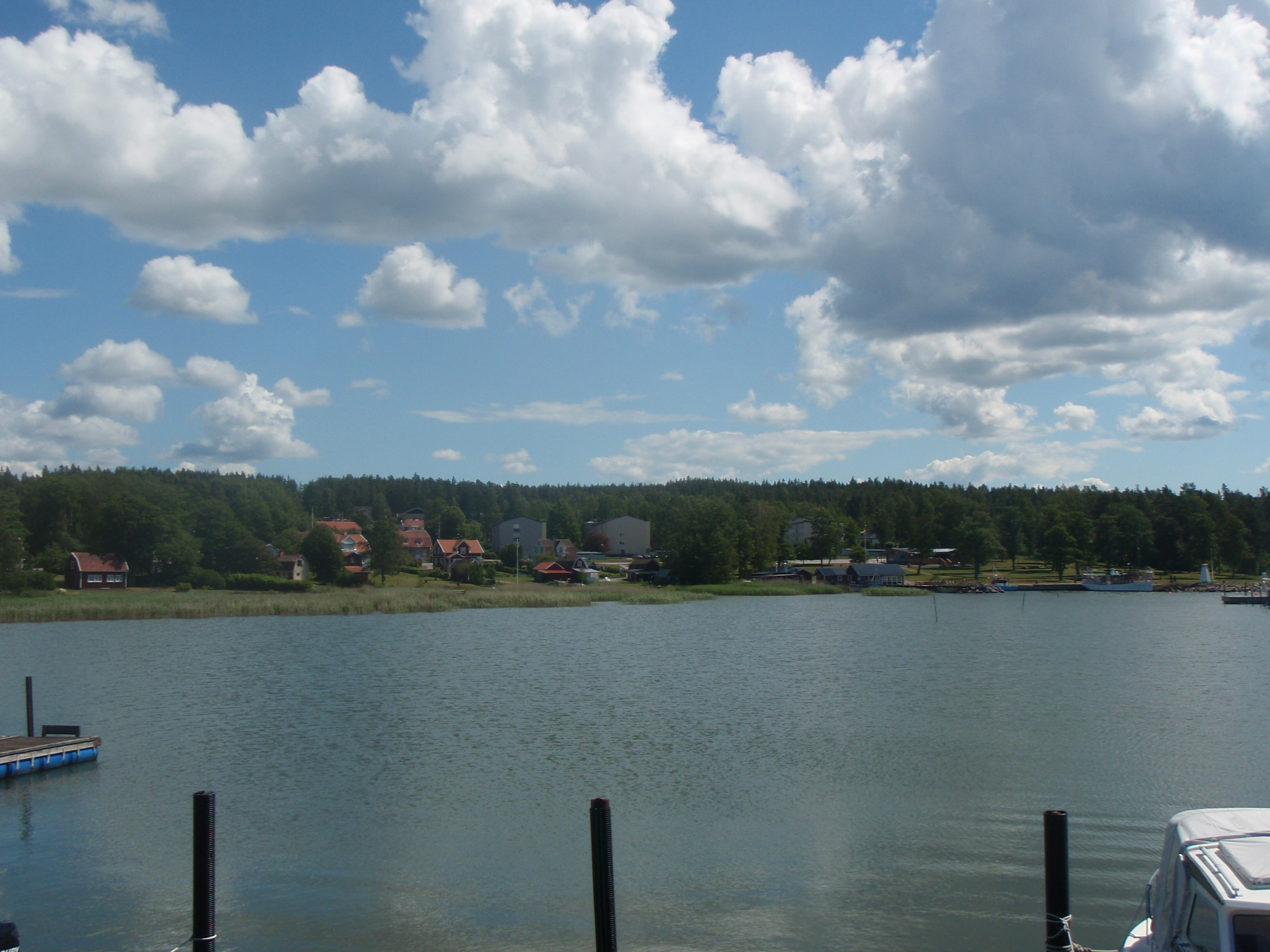

- Location within Västra Götaland Location within Sweden
- Coordinates: 58°57′N 14°02′E
- Country: Sweden
- Province: Västergötland
- County: Västra Götaland County
- Municipality: Gullspång Municipality

Area
  - Total: 1.47 km^{2} (0.57 sq mi)

Population (31 December 2010)
  - Total: 722
  - Density: 492/km^{2} (1,270/sq mi)
- Time zone: UTC+1 (CET)
  - Summer (DST): UTC+2 (CEST)

Otterbäcken right on the shores of Vänern is a locality situated in Gullspång Municipality, Västra Götaland County, Sweden. It had 722 inhabitants in 2010.

== Business ==
In Otterbäcken is a plywood factory run by Moelven-Vänerply. The plant is capable of producing 95,000 m³ of plywood a year. The company has about 160 employees and is the largest employer in the municipality.

During summer the campsite with its beach, playground, small kiosk and volleyball field attracts tourists and also the drive-in bingo during the later half of summer draws crowds. In the winter the local bandy team Otterbäckens BK is the great attraction.
