= Nora–Karlskoga Line =

Railway line in Sweden

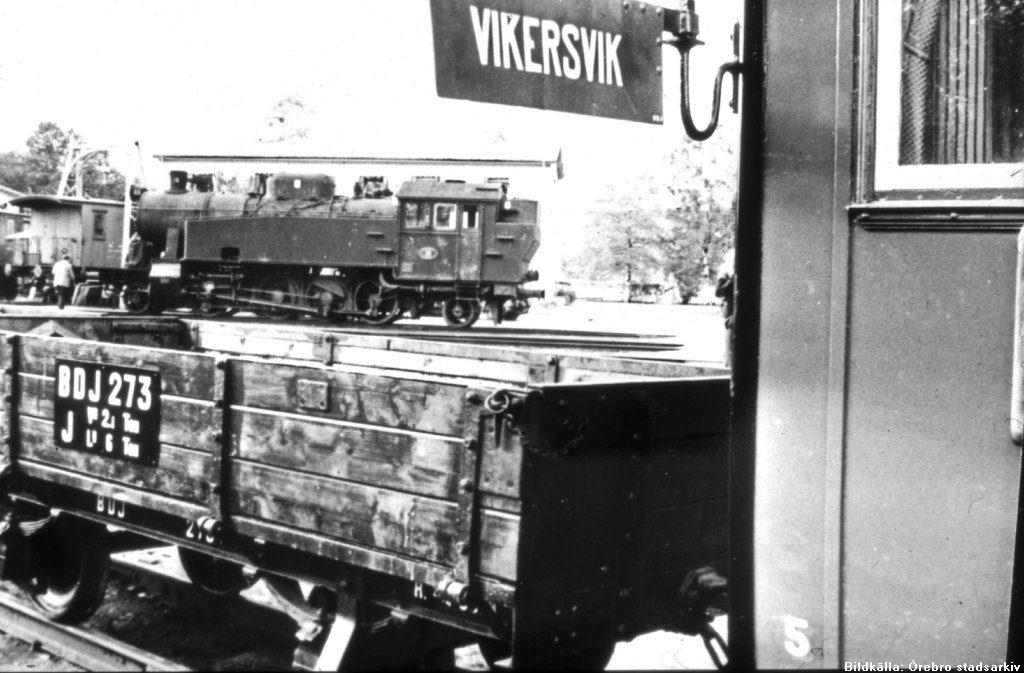

Overview
- Native name: Nora–Karlskoga Järnväg
- Status: Open
- Locale: Sweden
- Termini: Nora; Otterbäcken

Service
- System: Swedish railway

History
- Opened: 1874

Technical
- Character: Passenger and freight
- Electrification: No

The Nora–Karlskoga Line (Swedish: Nora–Karlskoga Järnväg) is a railway line between Nora and Otterbäcken.

The railway line officially opened in 1874 even though the Bofors–Strömtorp section had been in use since 1872.
