= Karlskoga Municipality =

Karlskoga Municipality Karlskoga kommun
- Municipality
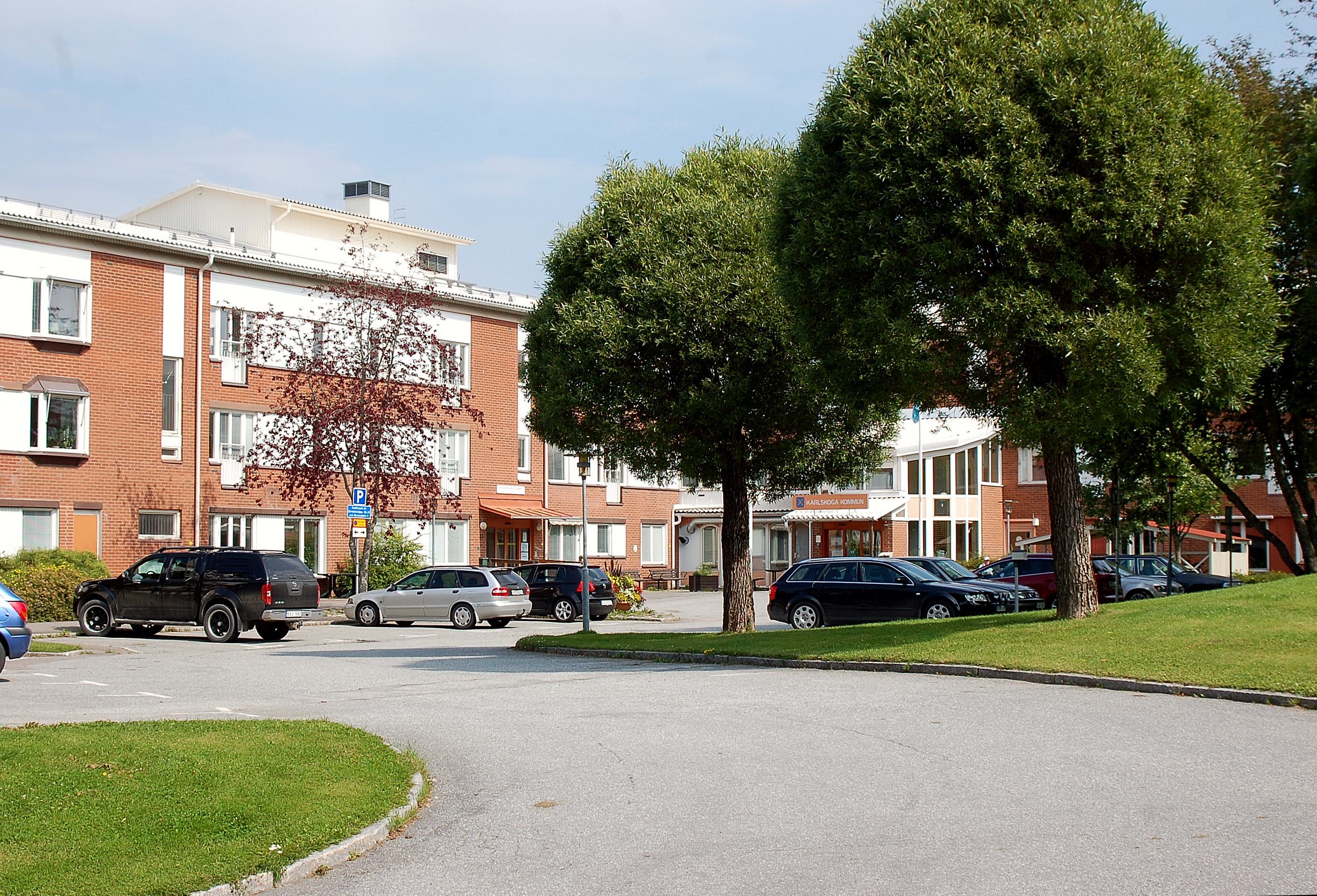
- Karlskoga Town Hall

- Coat of arms

- Coordinates: 59°20′N 14°31′E
- Country: Sweden
- County: Örebro County
- Seat: Karlskoga

Government
  - Chairman of the municipal board: Tony Ring (M)

Area
  - Total: 510.38 km^{2} (197.06 sq mi)
  - Land: 468.23 km^{2} (180.78 sq mi)
  - Water: 42.15 km^{2} (16.27 sq mi)
- Area as of 1 January 2014.

Population (30 June 2025)
  - Total: 30,134
  - Density: 64.357/km^{2} (166.68/sq mi)
- Time zone: UTC+1 (CET)
  - Summer (DST): UTC+2 (CEST)
- ISO 3166 code: SE
- Province: Värmland and Närke
- Municipal code: 1883
- Website: www.karlskoga.se
- Density is calculated using land area only.

Karlskoga Municipality (Swedish: Karlskoga kommun) is a municipality in Örebro County in central Sweden. Its seat is located in the city of Karlskoga. Other localities include Valåsen och Labbsand, Kortfors, Linnebäck and Villingsberg.

Karlskoga was formed as rural municipality when the first Swedish local government acts came into force in 1863. In 1925 the southern part was detached, forming Degerfors Municipality. In 1940 the whole municipality, including its non-urban areas, got the title of a city. These titles were abolished in 1971.

== Demographics ==
Population of Karlskoga by country of birth in 2022 (Note: Data applies to Karlskoga Municipality.)
Country of Birth	Population
Sweden	25,246
Non-Sweden	5,032
Finland	815
Syria	756
Somalia	338
Vietnam	332
Iraq	251
Afghanistan	247
Bosnia and Herzegovina	163
Norway	152
Turkey	136
Iran	121
Others	1,721
Total	30,278

This is a demographic table based on Karlskoga Municipality's electoral districts in the 2022 Swedish general election sourced from SVT's election platform, in turn taken from SCB official statistics.

In total there were 30,389 residents, including 23,534 Swedish citizens of voting age. 49.1% voted for the left coalition and 49.6% for the right coalition. Indicators are in percentage points except population totals and income.

Location	Residents	Citizen adults	Left vote	Right vote	Employed	Swedish parents	Foreign heritage	Income SEK	Degree
Location			%	%					
Aggerud	1,874	1,357	45.7	53.1	85	83	17	29,483	39
Bofors	1,736	1,314	52.5	46.3	84	82	18	28,385	36
Bohult	1,822	1,458	50.8	47.6	72	72	28	20,750	32
Bregården	1,870	1,519	47.5	50.9	83	82	18	28,564	47
Bråten	1,872	1,365	52.4	47.1	88	89	11	28,826	38
Ekeby	1,678	1,409	50.1	48.2	76	74	26	22,735	26
Granbergsdal	1,620	1,303	41.0	58.0	85	92	8	28,297	24
Häsängen	1,763	1,395	41.4	57.7	86	87	13	28,584	28
Karlberg	1,736	1,331	45.7	53.3	82	85	15	26,599	30
Karls-Åby	1,723	1,433	49.2	50.1	85	90	10	29,147	46
Landa	1,984	1,234	56.2	40.7	51	45	55	15,723	25
Rävåsen	1,641	1,445	52.7	46.5	83	85	15	24,072	29
Sandmo	1,579	1,344	53.9	44.9	75	77	23	19,825	29
Sandviken	1,694	1,325	56.4	42.2	70	64	36	21,209	32
Skranta	2,069	1,428	47.8	50.5	72	66	34	24,039	34
Stråningstorp	1,861	1,340	51.3	47.2	78	75	25	25,502	33
Österleden	1,867	1,534	46.4	52.7	82	83	17	25,831	33
Source: SVT

== Riksdag elections ==
Year	%	Votes	V	S	MP	C	L	KD	M	SD	NyD	Left	Right
1973	91.6	24,449	7.0	55.3		19.4	7.0	1.3	9.4			62.3	35.9
1976	92.6	25,049	5.2	53.9		18.2	10.0	1.0	11.1			59.1	39.3
1979	91.4	24,703	6.4	54.2		12.4	9.9	1.1	15.4			60.6	37.7
1982	92.6	24,965	6.0	57.6		9.5	4.9	1.7	18.9			63.6	33.3
1985	91.1	24,487	6.1	56.7	1.0	6.9	12.5		16.8			62.7	36.2
1988	86.8	22,951	7.3	55.5	2.8	6.1	11.4	2.2	14.3			65.7	31.8
1991	87.1	22,473	5.3	49.9	1.8	4.0	8.8	5.7	17.5		6.8	55.2	36.0
1994	86.3	21,815	7.4	56.5	3.4	3.7	5.8	2.9	18.3		1.6	67.2	30.7
1998	81.0	19,766	14.8	47.2	2.9	2.2	3.4	9.2	17.3			64.9	32.1
2002	79.6	18,738	8.9	54.6	2.9	2.8	9.6	6.6	11.3	1.2		66.4	30.4
2006	81.5	18,917	6.4	49.4	3.2	4.2	4.7	5.3	19.8	3.0		58.9	34.1
2010	84.3	19,567	5.3	46.3	5.4	3.1	5.3	4.8	23.2	4.7		57.0	36.4
2014	85.7	19,877	5.0	44.7	4.8	3.4	3.3	3.6	18.7	14.4		54.4	29.0
2018	87.1	19,899	7.2	37.5	2.8	6.0	4.0	4.8	18.0	18.3		53.5	45.1
2022	84.3	19,604	5.0	37.4	2.6	4.0	3.0	3.9	18.9	23.7		49.1	49.6

== International relations ==
=== Twin towns – Sister cities ===
Karlskoga is twinned with:

- Aalborg, Denmark
- Fredrikstad, Norway
- Wheaton, Illinois, United States
- Húsavík, Iceland
- Narva, Estonia
- Olaine, Latvia
- Riihimäki, Finland
- Sanremo, Italy

Suspended twin towns

- Ivangorod, Russia (suspended in 2022)

=== Partnership and friendship ===
Karlskoga also cooperates with:

- Birmingham, England
- Bremen, Germany
- Irvine, Scotland
- Jordanów, Poland
- Łódź, Poland
- Lüchow-Dannenberg, Germany
- Rheinfelden, Germany
- (United Kingdom) Strathclyde, Scotland
- Unter Franken, Germany
- Vale of Glamorgan, Wales
- Vitry-le-François, France
- Watford, England

== See also ==
- Karlskoga Mountain District
